= University of Milan =

University in Milan, Italy

- Università degli Studi di Milano
- Logo of the University of Milan
- Latin: Universitas Studiorum Mediolanensis
- Other name: UNIMI
- Motto: Scientia illuminans dignum
- Motto in English: Knowledge enlightening the worthy
- Type: Public
- Established: 1924
- Academic affiliations: EUA; LERU
- Budget: €603 million (2024)
- Rector: Prof. Marina Brambilla
- Academic staff: 2,566 (2025)
- Administrative staff: 2,189 (2024)
- Students: 64,878 (2025)
- Undergraduates: 48,880 (2025)
- Postgraduates: 14,578 (2025)
- Doctoral students: 1,420 (2025)
- Location: Milan, Italy; 45°27′40″N 9°11′41″E
- Campus: Urban
- Language: Italian, English
- Colours: Milan blue
- Sporting affiliations: CUS Milano
- Website: unimi.it

The University of Milan (Italian: Università degli Studi di Milano; Latin: Universitas Studiorum Mediolanensis), officially abbreviated as UniMi, or colloquially referred to as La Statale ("the State university"), is a public research university in Milan, Italy. It is one of the largest universities in Europe, with 64,878 students and a permanent teaching and research staff of 2,566 (4,653 including all researchers) as of 2025.

The University of Milan has ten schools and offers 140 undergraduate and graduate degree programmes, 32 doctoral schools and 65+ specialization schools. The university's research and teaching activities have grown over the years and have received important international recognitions. The university is especially well known for its excellence in medical research and is often ranked as 1st in Italy in the field of Medicine, being also ranked among the top medical schools in the world. The University of Milan is one of the twelve founding members (2002) and the only Italian member of the League of European Research Universities (LERU), an elite group of 24 research-intensive European universities, as of 2026.

The university has been frequented by many notable alumni, including Enrico Bombieri (Fields Medal recipient, 1974), Riccardo Giacconi (Nobel laureate in Physics, 2002), Marco Bersanelli (Gruber Prize in Cosmology recipient, 2006), Patrizia Caraveo (Bruno Rossi Prize recipient, 2007, 2011, 2012), Alberto Mantovani (Robert Koch Prize recipient, 2016), Fabiola Gianotti (two times CERN general director and Bruno Pontecorvo Prize recipient, 2019), as well as former Italian prime ministers Silvio Berlusconi and Bettino Craxi, and former Greek president Karolos Papoulias. The university has also been affiliated with notable faculty such as Giulio Natta (Nobel laureate in Chemistry, 1963), Giuseppe Occhialini (Wolf Prize in Physics recipient, 1979), and Ugo Amaldi (Bruno Pontecorvo Prize recipient, 1995).

== History ==
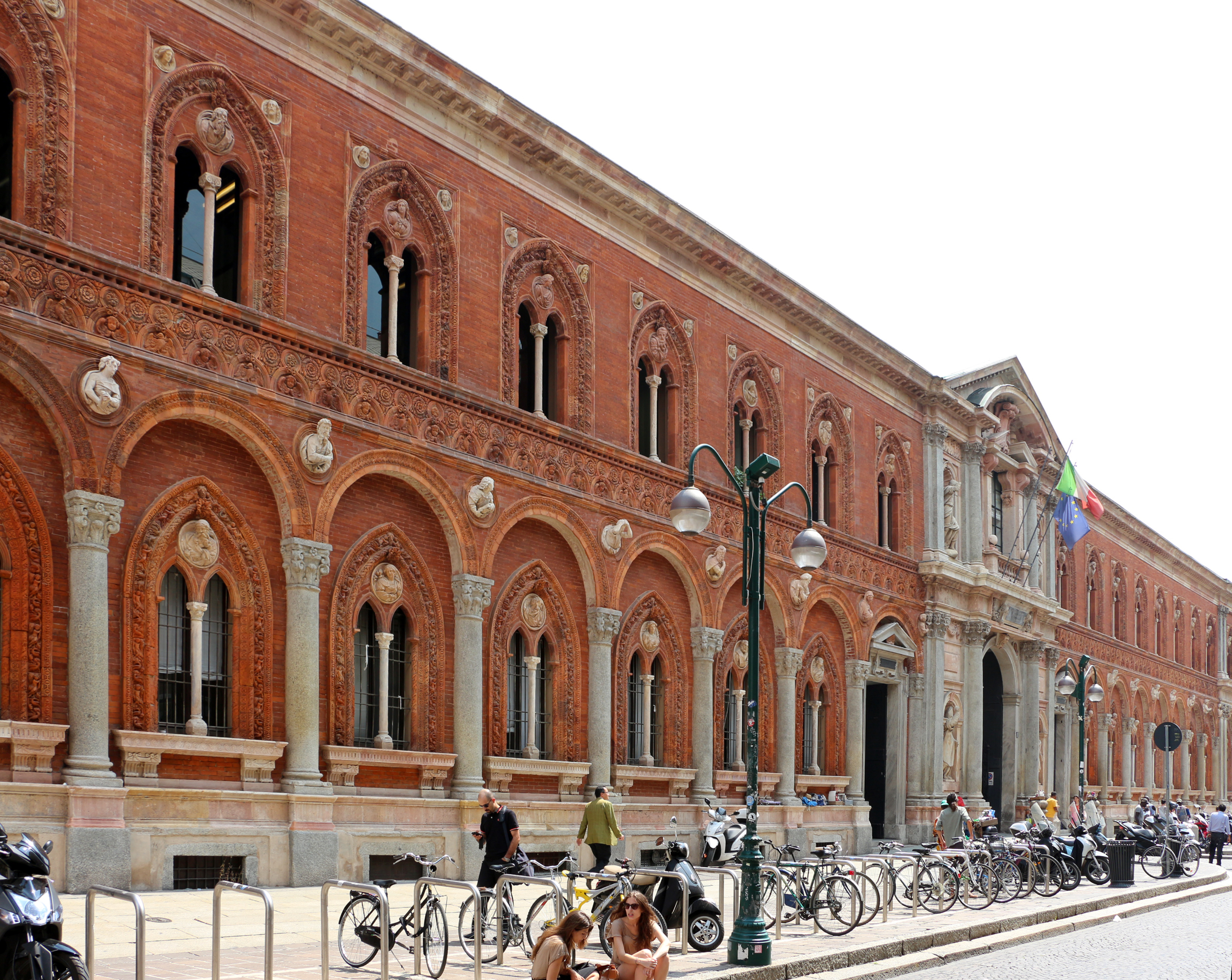
Built in 1456 by Francesco I Sforza, Duke of Milan, the Ca' Granda designed by the Renaissance period architect Filarete is the headquarters of the University of Milan

=== Early years ===
The University of Milan was founded in 1924 from the merger of two institutions that boasted a great tradition of medical, scientific and humanistic studies: the Accademia Scientifico-Letteraria (Scientific-Literary Academy), active since 1861, and the Istituti Clinici di Perfezionamento (Clinical Specialisation Institutes), established in 1906. By 1928, the university already had the fourth-highest number of enrolled students in Italy, after the University of Naples, Sapienza University of Rome and the University of Padua. Many of its premises are located in Città Studi (City of Studies), the university district of Milan (where the Polytechnic University of Milan is also located) which was built from 1915 onwards. The scientific Schools and Departments of the University of Milan are mostly located in the Città Studi district, while the School of Humanities, School of Law, School of Political, Economic and Social Sciences, among others, are mostly located within the historic city centre.

At the time of its foundation, there were four "traditional" Schools – Law, Humanities, Medicine, and Mathematical, Physical and Natural Sciences. Later, in the 1930s, the Schools of Veterinary Medicine and Agriculture were introduced, after the aggregation of the old Schools of Veterinary Medicine (1792) and Agriculture (1871).

At the end of the Second World War, the old Ospedale Maggiore di Milano (Major Hospital of Milan) building, originally named the Magna Domus Hospitalis (The Great House of the Hospital) and colloquially known as the Ca' Granda (The Great House), was assigned to the University of Milan. One of the first Italian examples of civil architecture and the main building of the Policlinico of Milan hospital complex established during the Renaissance period, it was designed by Filarete and commissioned in 1456 by Francesco I Sforza, the fourth Duke of Milan (the first Duke from the House of Sforza, which had succeeded the House of Visconti in 1450). The building had been seriously damaged by the bombings of 1943. In 1958, after a complex series of reconstruction and renovation works, it became home to the University Rector's Office, the administrative offices, and the Schools of Law and Humanities.

=== 1960s reformation ===
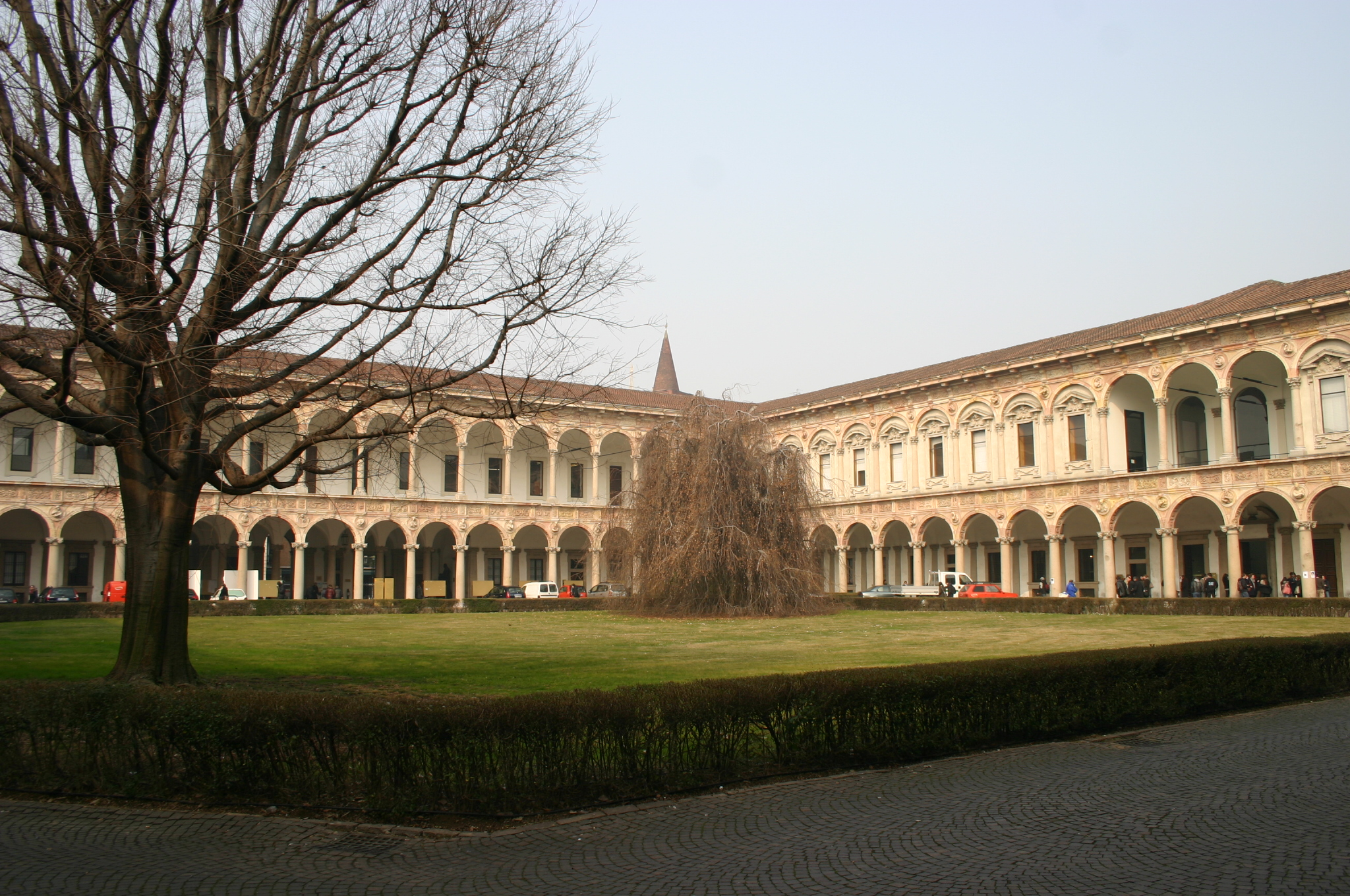
Cloister of the main building

In the 1960s, due to the extension of compulsory school attendance and the subsequent liberalisation of access to higher education, the number of people entering Italian universities progressively increased and the University of Milan enrolled more than 60,000 students. The university broadened the range of its courses and at the same time increased its number of centres. Two new schools (the School of Pharmacy and the School of Social and Political Sciences) were established, and were based, respectively, in Città Studi and in Via Conservatorio, in the city centre of Milan. Città Studi was also the site of a new complex, intended entirely for the Biology departments, which was the work of architect Vico Magistretti.

There was also an increase in the number of agreements with the city's hospital facilities, where students from the School of Medicine receive their clinical training. In 1968, the university was occupying approximately 127,000 m^{2} (1,370,000 sq ft); by the beginning of the 1980s this had increased to 205,000 m^{2} (2,210,000 sq ft). In 1989 there were 22 degree-awarding schools and 75,000 enrolled students, which increased to 90,000 by 1993.

=== 1980s streamline process ===
In view of this increase, the university began a process of streamlining and delocalising its facilities: from 1986 onwards, new centres began to appear in other areas of Milan, particularly in the Bicocca district, as well as in other parts of the region: in Como, Varese, Crema and Lodi.

In 1998, the university split in two and the city's second public institution was founded: The University of Milan-Bicocca. The University of Insubria was also established in Varese, bringing together courses that were already offered at Varese and Como by the Universities of Milan and Pavia. At the conclusion of this process, notwithstanding the reduction in the number of students, the University of Milan was still the largest institution in Lombardy and still one of the largest in the country.

The 2001 law that transformed the education system opened a new phase of change. The university updated its range of courses, trying to adapt them to better suit the evolution of the social demand for education and the innovation of the production system: thus, the number of degree-awarding programmes rose to 74 and there was a new increase in enrolments. There was also an increase in the university's commitment to providing student services (orientation, internships and training, online education) and in investments for new education and research facilities, covering approximately 80,000 m^{2} (860,000 sq ft).

The most recent phase of expansion concerned the fields of communication science, intercultural mediation and art, but there are also ongoing projects relating to the sectors of information technology, veterinary medicine and biomedicine. Furthermore, there was also a strengthening of commitment to technology transfer and the practical application of scientific research results in the economic-production context.

=== Present ===
At present, the university comprises 9 schools, 134 degree-awarding programmes (both undergraduate and graduate), 19 doctoral schools (scuole di dottorato) and 92 specialisation schools (scuole di specializzazione). Approximately 65,000 students are enrolled at the university. The teaching staff is composed of 2,500 tenured professors and researchers and approximately 500 adjunct professors. More than 2,300 people work in the technical and administrative sector. The University of Milan was one of the institutions that helped to establish the League of European Research Universities (LERU) and is the only Italian member of the organisation. Thanks to its commitment to basic and applied research, the University of Milan is among Italy's top institutions in the main national and international rankings.

== Academics ==
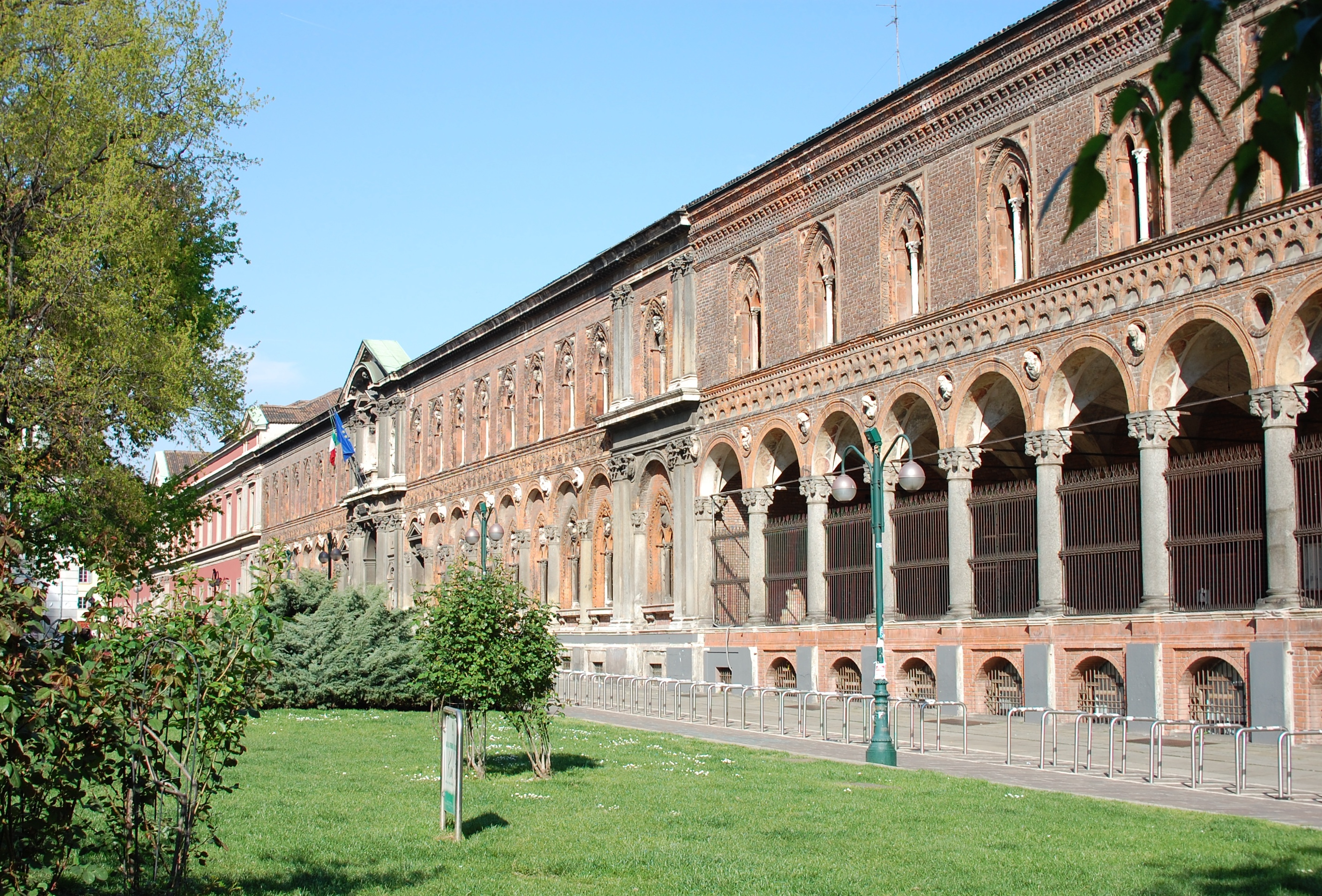
The University of Milan headquarters at Via Festa del Perdono

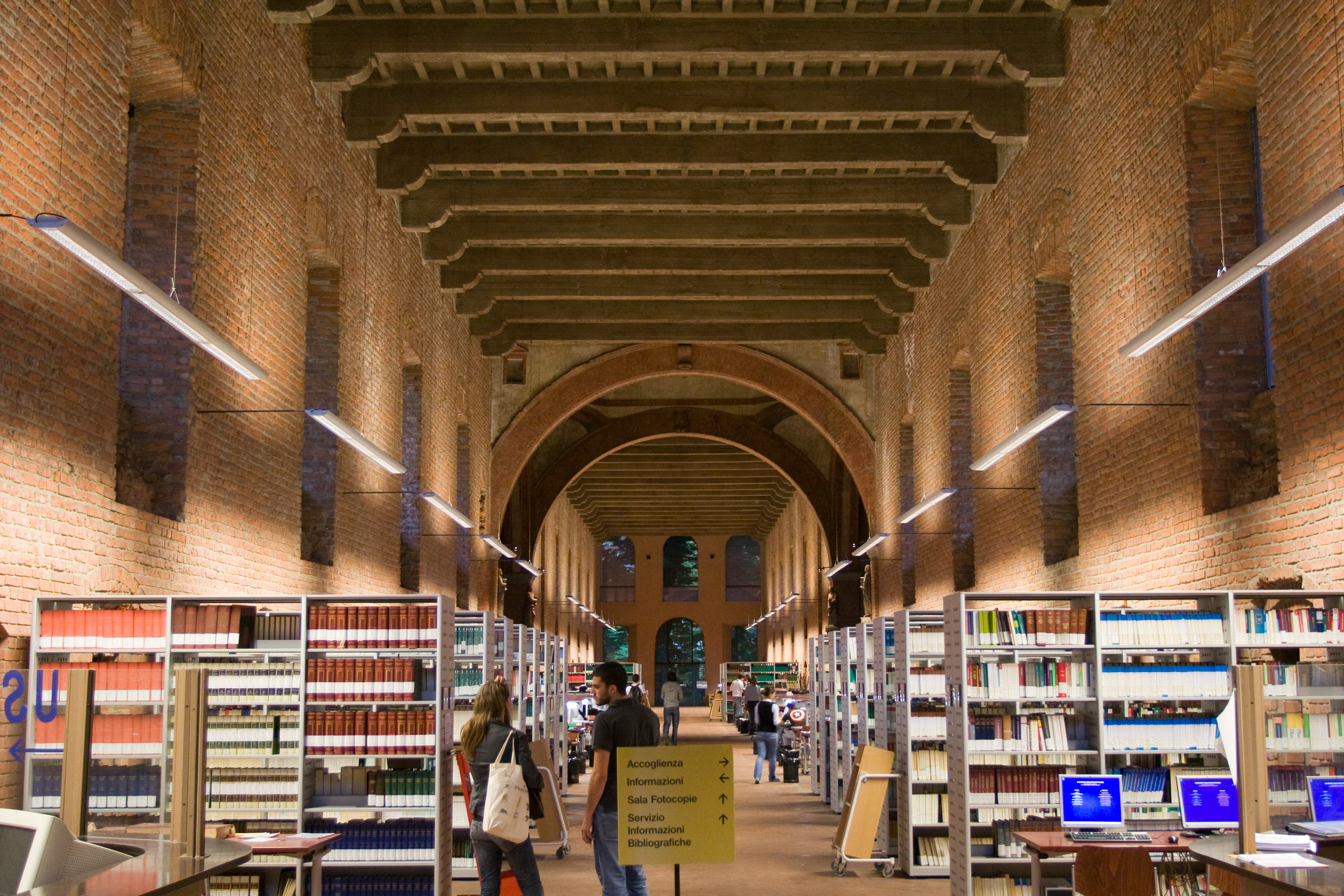
University of Milan, central library of Law and Humanities

The University of Milan is a public teaching and research university, the second largest university in Italy, which – with 10 schools and a teaching staff of about 2,200 – comprises a wide variety of disciplinary fields.

=== Schools ===
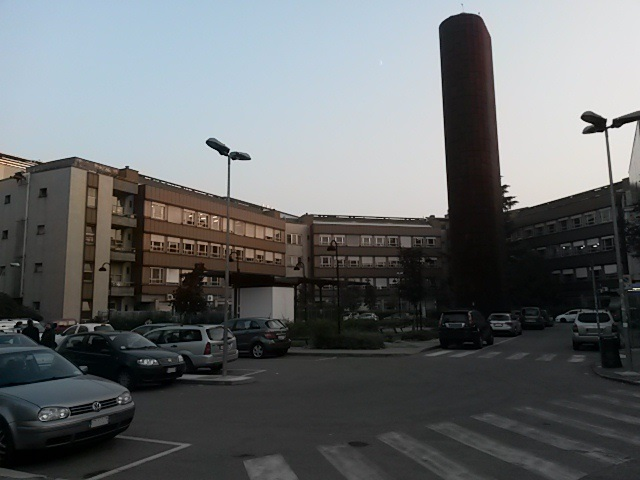
The "Omega" building of the Department of Chemistry at the centre of the didactic area of UNIMI in Città Studi, Milan

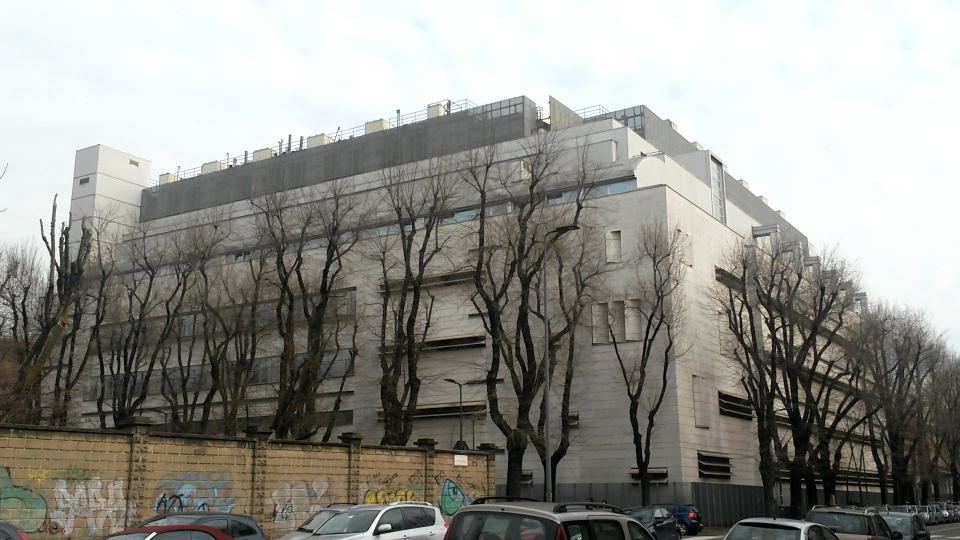
The main building of the Department of Pharmaceutical Sciences in Città Studi, Milan

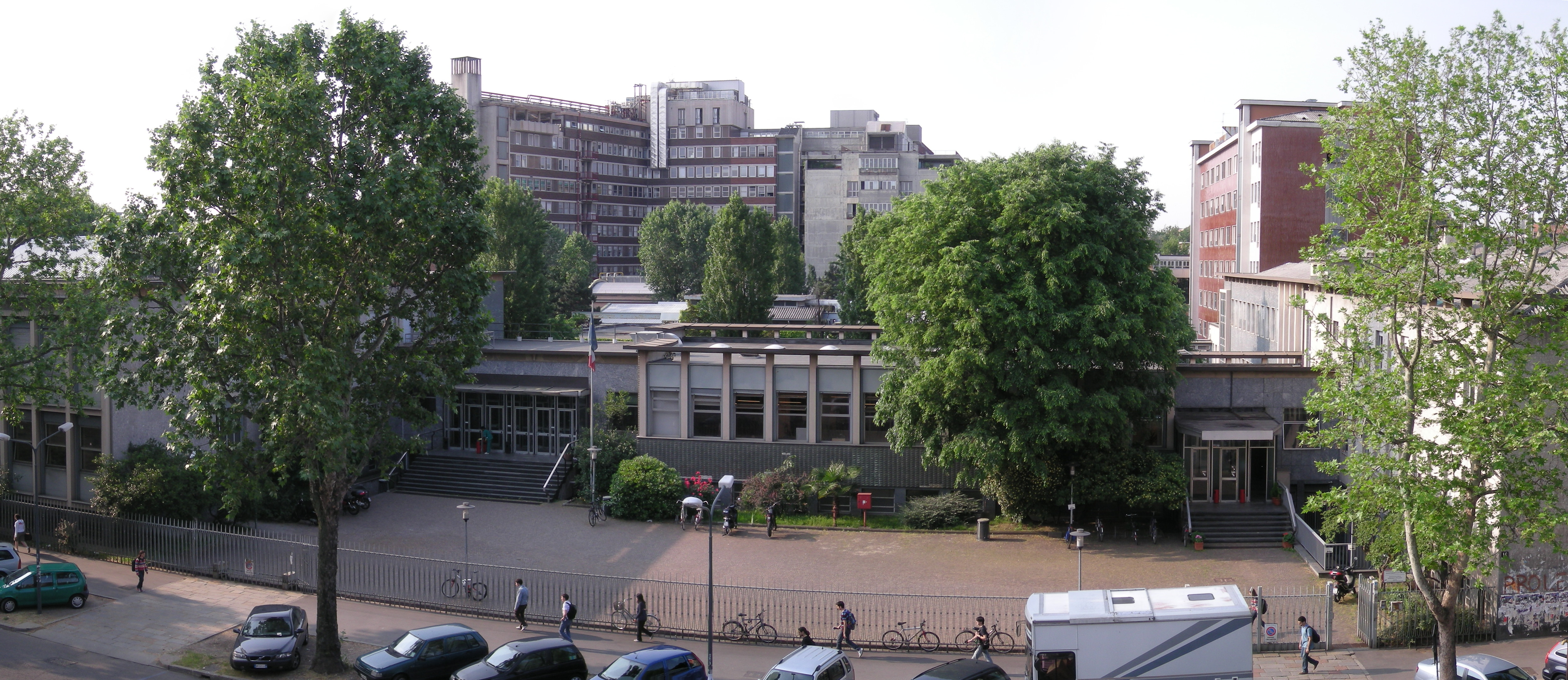
The Department of Physics in Città Studi, Milan, seen from across Via Celoria

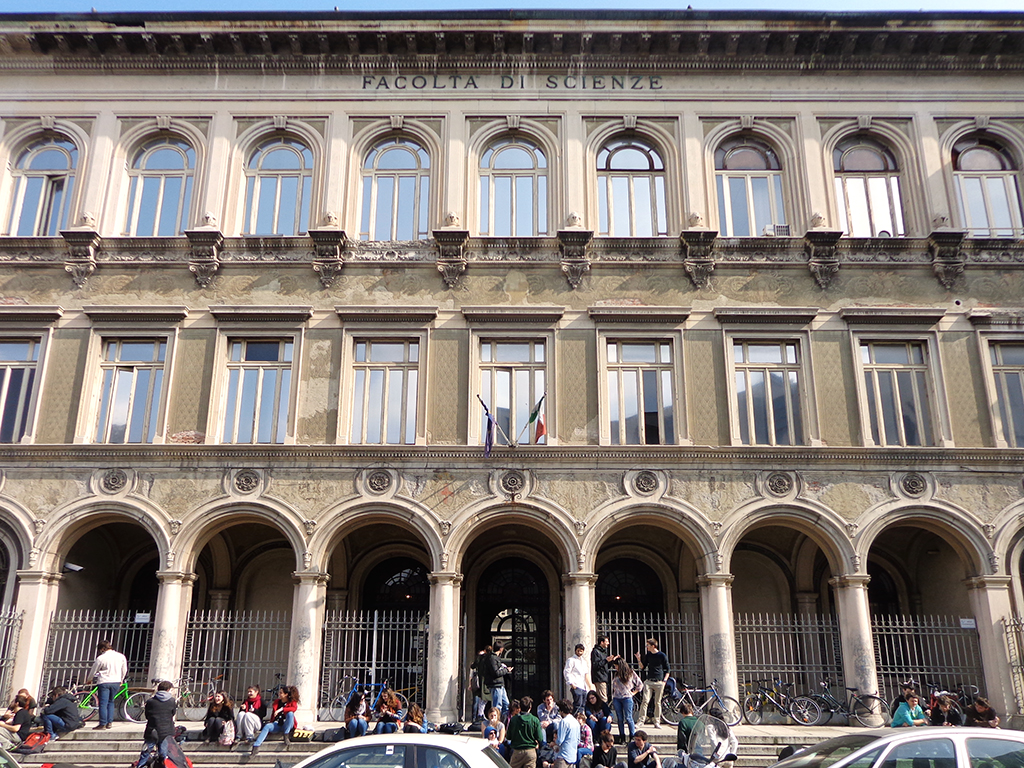
The main building of the Department of Mathematics in Città Studi, Milan

The university comprises 10 Schools (facoltà):

- School of Law
- School of Medicine
- School of Humanities
- School of Veterinary Medicine
- School of Agricultural and Food Sciences
- School of Pharmaceutical Sciences
- School of Science and Technology
- School of Exercise and Sport Sciences
- School of Political, Economic and Social Sciences
- School of Linguistics and Cultural Mediation

=== Admissions ===
Degree programmes at the University of Milan are divided into two types: open-admission programmes and capped-enrolment programmes. Each degree programme defines the knowledge and requirements for matriculation; these may be verified through a compulsory test and/or through an interview for assessing the student's educational background, prior to matriculation. To enrol in capped-enrolment programmes, students must register for an entrance examination, pass it and rank high enough to be awarded one of the places available.

To enroll at the University of Milan is required an English language assessment, which can be demonstrated by an international language certificate CEFR, or through the university language centre (SLAM). The required level for Bachelors usually stands at B1 (Intermediate), while for Masters is B2, but varies depending on the degree course. Those who will not have attained the language level required by their degree programme via Placement test or certification must attend an English language course, and pass the final exam. With the University of Milano-Bicocca, and the Alma Mater of Bologna, is the most sought-after location for medical students, with an acceptance rate of about 5%.

=== Graduation ===
Full-time students are expected to earn 60 ECTS credits in one academic year. The credits awarded can be recognized for continuing studies, both in Italian universities and abroad. To be awarded a bachelor, the student must earn at least 180 ECTS, while to get a master 120 ECTS are needed. Also, to obtain the highest level of university education, the Dottorato di Ricerca (PhD), at least other 3 to 4 years of studies are required.

=== Financial Support ===
The University of Milan provides several types of financial support for its students:

- Education incentive Programme: Regional scholarships consisting of a sum of money and free access to refectory services, awarded yearly, via competition, to university students meeting certain merit, income and regular attendance requirements. Additional DSU allowances and grants includes Disability, International mobility, and Special grant allowances.
- University scholarships: Need-based and merit scholarships from €1,800 to €6,000 per year
- International scholarships: "Excellence Scholarships" for students enrolled in the first year of a master's degree programme, providing €6,000 grant, full tuition and accommodation paid.

The university also provides accommodation, refectory services and meals allowances for a large number of students.

== Research ==
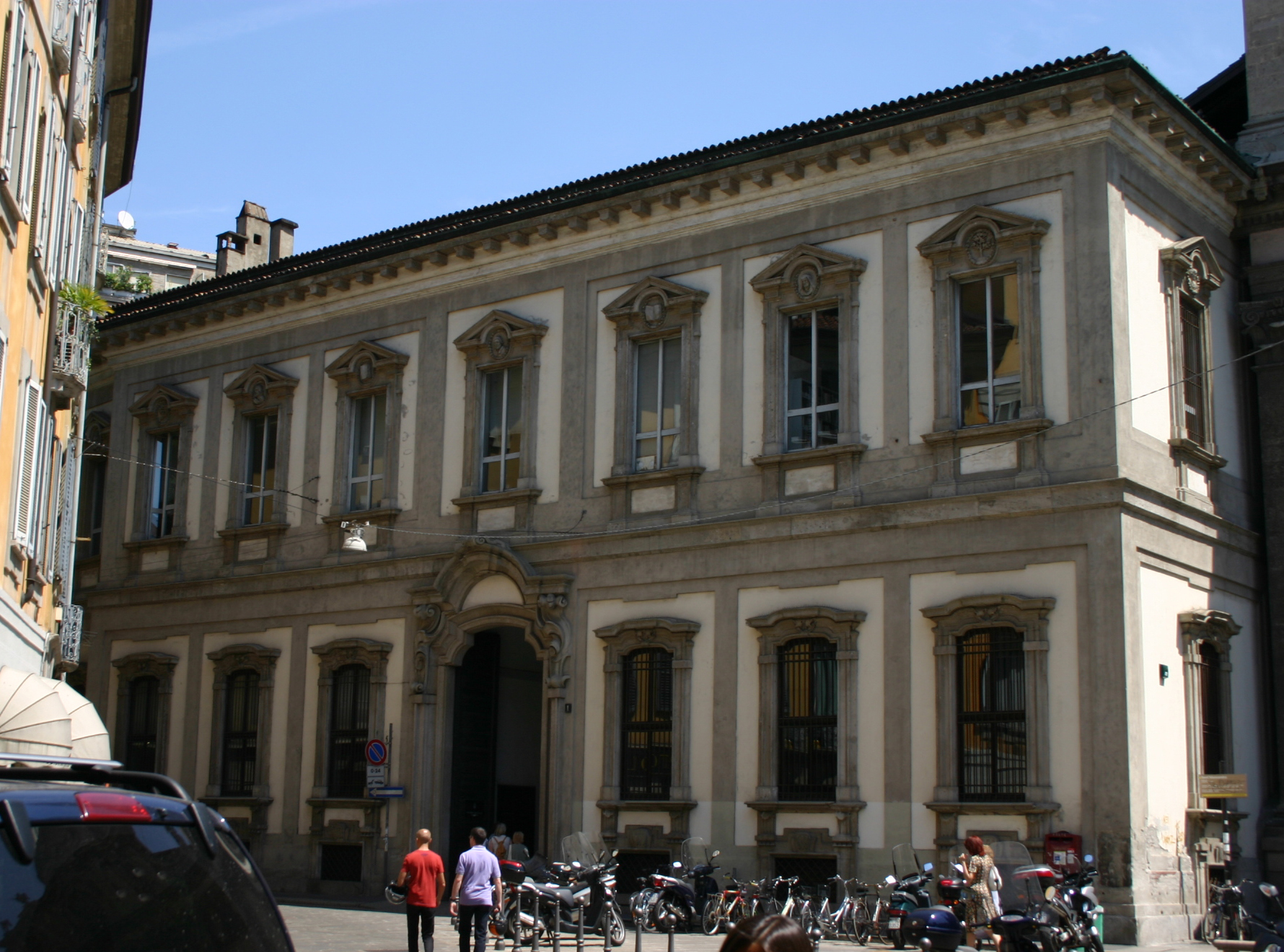
Collegio di Sant'Alessandro (1663), historically the Scuole Arcimbolde, is the seat of the School of Languages and Foreign Literature

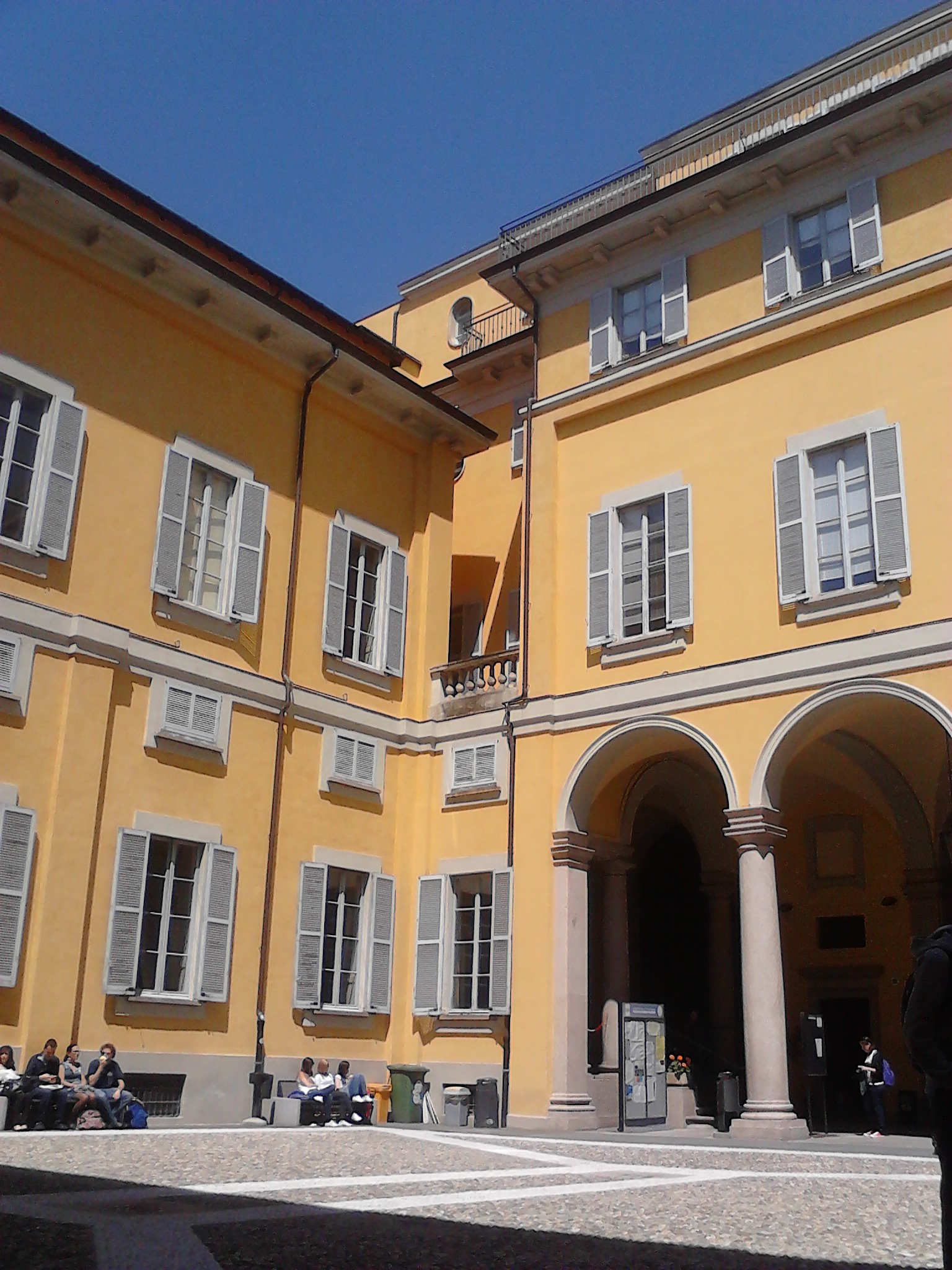
Palazzo Resta Pallavicino (1743), seat of the School of Political, Economic and Social Sciences

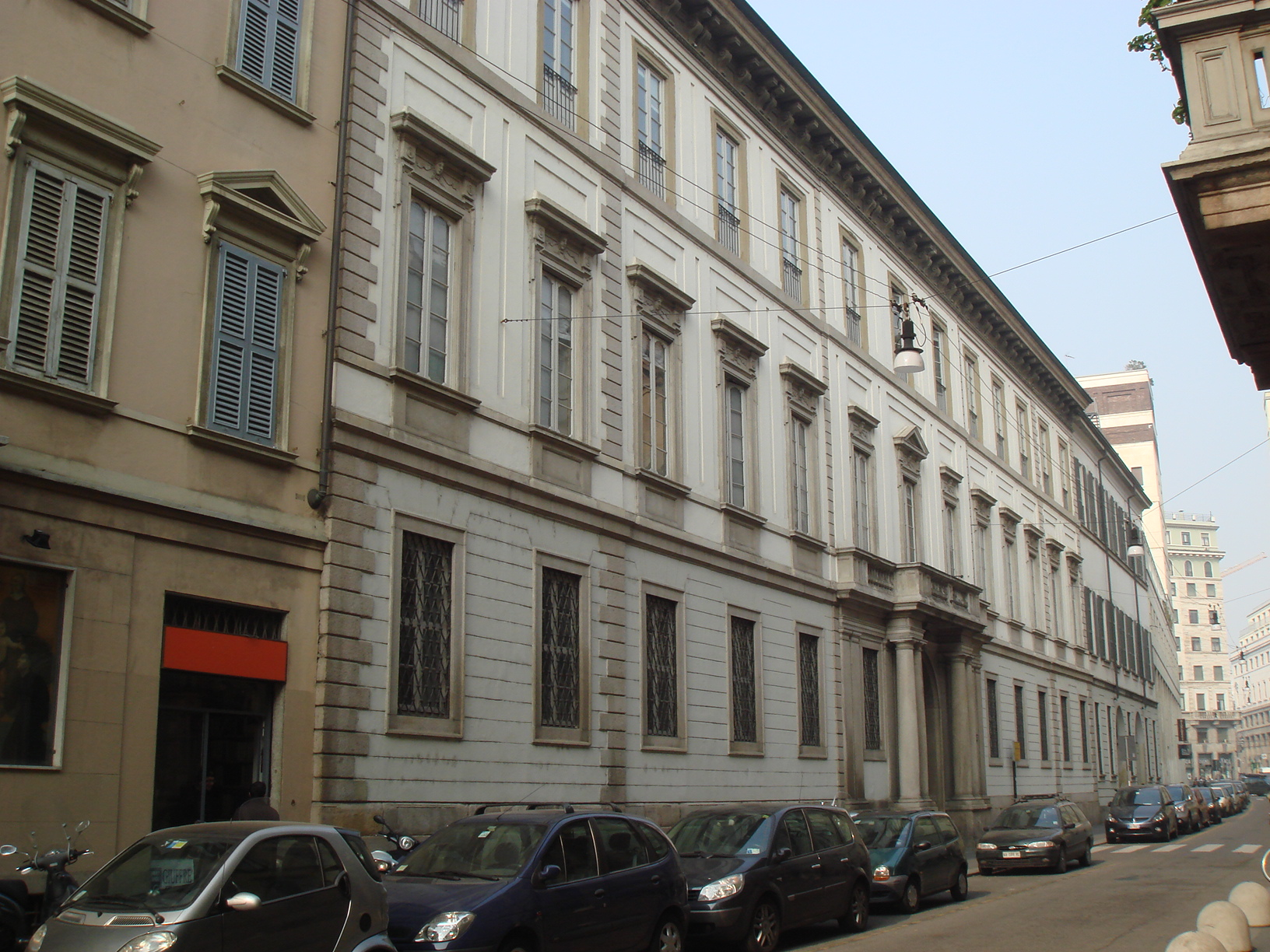
Palazzo Greppi (1778), designed by Giuseppe Piermarini, is noted for its halls with 18th-century interiors

There are 53 research centres. Research is organised in 33 different departments:

- Law: Private Law and Legal History, Italian and Supranational Public Law, Law.
- Medicine: Medical Biotechnology and Translational Medicine, Pathophysiology and Transplantation, Oncology and Hematology-Oncology, Biomedical Sciences for Health, Biomedical and Clinical Sciences, Biomedical, Surgical and Dental Sciences, Clinical Sciences and Community Health, Health Sciences.
- Humanities: Cultural and Environmental Heritage, Philosophy, Foreign Languages and Literatures, Literary Studies, Philology and Linguistics, Historical Studies.
- Veterinary Medicine: Veterinary Medicine, Veterinary Science for Health, Animal Production and Food Safety.
- Agricultural and Food Sciences: Agricultural and Environmental Sciences – Production, Landscape, Agroenergy, Food, Environmental and Nutritional Sciences, Environmental Science and Policy
- Pharmaceutical Sciences: Pharmacological and Biomolecular Sciences, Pharmaceutical Sciences.
- Science and Technology: Biosciences, Chemistry, Physics, Computer Science, Mathematics, Earth Sciences, Environmental Science and Policy.
- Exercise and Sport Sciences: Biomedical Sciences for Health.
- Political, Economic and Social Sciences: Economics, Management and Quantitative Methods, Social and Political Sciences, International, Legal, Historical and Political Studies.
- Linguistics and Cultural Mediation: Language Mediation and Intercultural Communication.

As a public institution concerned with the development and progress of knowledge, the university has always been committed to research projects that influence the quality of life of citizens. Research is mostly conducted in the departments and the many specialised structures, favouring the creation and growth of networks of collaboration locally, nationally and internationally.

Scientific activity involves the whole academic community from professors, researchers, doctoral students, fellowship-holders and fellows to undergraduates.

=== Quality and impact of research (2020) ===
- Publications: 9537
- Open access publications: 5074
- Top 10% area publications (SciVal): 33.9%
- Field Weighted-Citation Impact (SciVal): 1,78
- Unimi publications/national publications (SciVal): 5.55%
- ERC grants since the beginning of the project: 37

== Governance ==
The governance structure at the University of Milan is composed by 17 committees, headed by the Rector. The most important boards are:

=== The Board of Directors ===
It has the function of strategy definition and management, approval of the annual and three-year financial and personnel planning documents, and supervision of economic and financial sustainability. It is composed of the Rector, the Vice Rector, the General Director, and selected internal and external members.

=== The Academic Senate ===
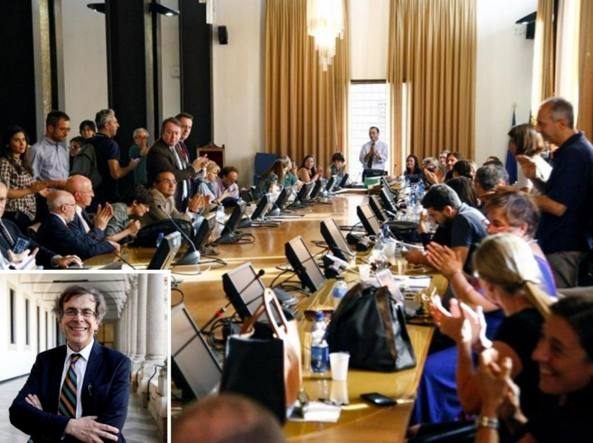
An image of the Academic Senate of the University of Milan during a meeting on June 29, 2018, with Prof. Elio Franzini, the Rector between 2018 and 2024, at left. Prof. Marina Brambilla is the current Rector since October 1, 2024.

The Academic Senate has functions of proposal, supervision and verification in the field of teaching, research and student services, and is composed of Rector, Vice Rector, the 10 faculty directors, and elected representative of professors, researchers and students.

=== Patent Committee ===
Its statutory duties are to review patent applications, express an opinion on patents filed whenever a decision is required, and also express an opinion on industrial property clauses in commissioned research and patent enhancement contracts, and in research agreements with other institutions. It's composed by the General Director, three selected professors, and two external experts.

=== University Sports Committee ===
The University Sports Committee promotes and encourages sports activities for the entire University community and oversees management guidelines for sports facilities and development programmes. The chairman of this board is the Deputy Rector. Every year the Committee presents a report on the university sports facilities, next year's programmeand financial plan to the Ministry of Education, University and Research.

=== Research Observatory ===
It is composed of scientific experts belonging to various scientific disciplinary sectors, as well as administrative and technical sectors. Its members are renewed every three academic years. The Observatory, as per the Regulations, collects and analyzes information on University research findings. As part of this function, it analyzes and compares the results of national research assessment exercises. It also proposes criteria and new methodologies for assessing University research findings, taking into account the specificities of each area, and submits improvement actions to the main governing bodies, with a view to increasing research quality and attractiveness, as well as national and international visibility.

== Campuses ==
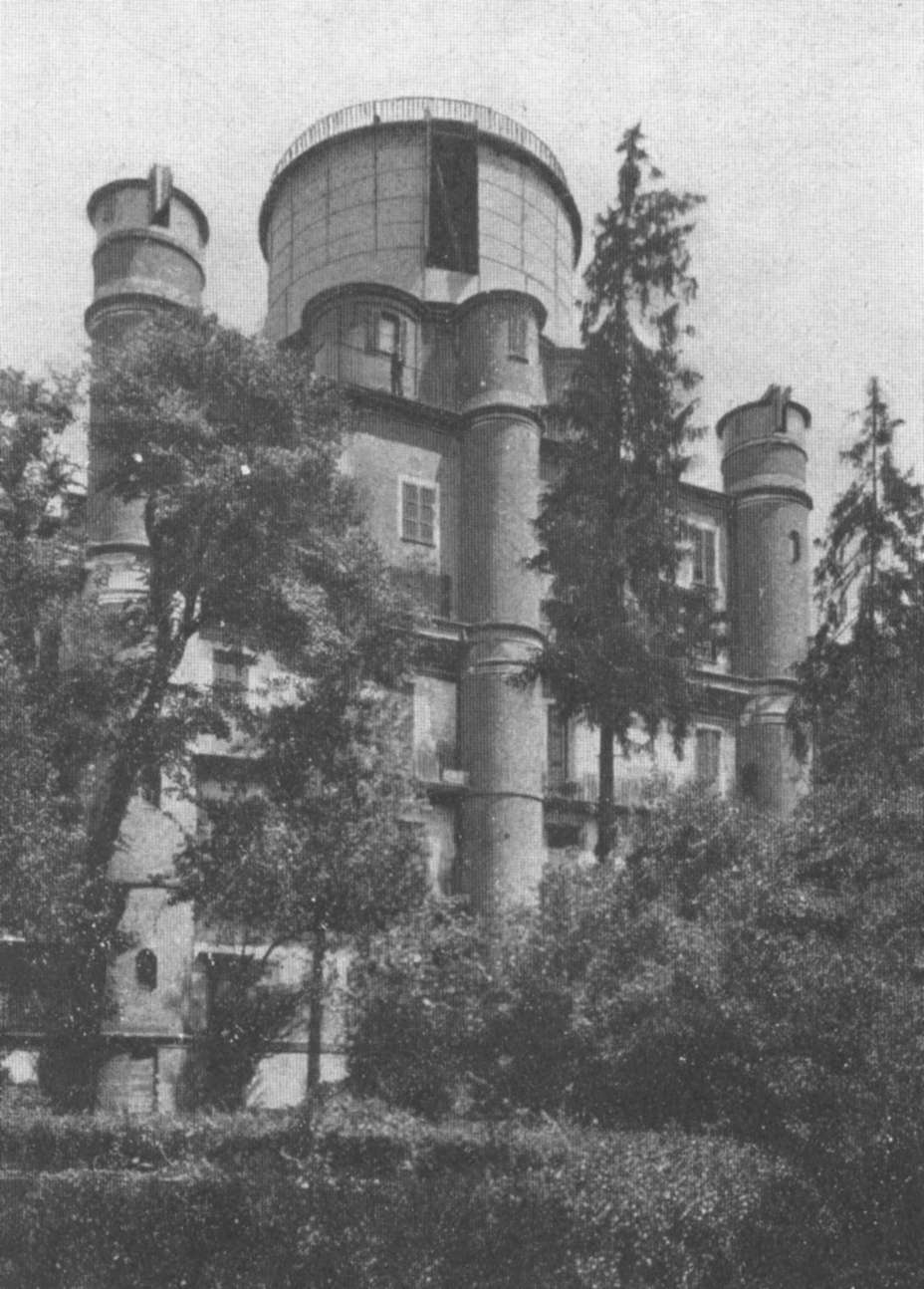
Brera Observatory (1764)

The departments of the University of Milan are housed in important historic buildings in the centre of Milan and in modern buildings in the area known as Città Studi (City of Studies). Among the historic palazzos that house the university's facilities are the 15th-century Ca' Granda (The Great House) built in 1456 by Francesco I Sforza, Duke of Milan, and designed by Filarete as a monumental hospital complex in the heart of the historical city centre; the 17th-century Sant’Alessandro College, also known as the Palazzo delle Scuole Arcimbolde, which was designed by Lorenzo Binago and commissioned by Giambattista Arcimboldi, a member of the Arcimboldi family who built it in 1663; the 18th-century Palazzo Greppi designed by Giuseppe Piermarini (architect of La Scala in Milan) and built by count Antonio Greppi between 1772 and 1778; and the 18th-century Palazzo Resta Pallavicino (originally designed in the Baroque style and built by Carlo Resta between 1724 and 1743 and enlarged by count Giuseppe Resta, it was subsequently owned by the marquises of the Pallavicino family—a cadet branch of the Obertenghi who were the progenitors of several European noble families and dynasties—who rebuilt its interior, while the building's Neo-Classical facade on Via Conservatorio was constructed later between 1837 and 1839). The university's book collection, which is one of the richest in the region, is preserved in 47 libraries. The APICE Centre collects rare and valuable book stocks and archives. The university possesses a substantial artistic and cultural heritage that includes renowned historic buildings, inherited and acquired collections, archives, botanical gardens such as the Brera Botanical Garden, and the 18th-century Brera Astronomical Observatory which was commissioned by Maria Theresa, Habsburg monarch and Holy Roman Empress, and built in 1764 within the grounds of the historic Palazzo Brera.

The total university surface area is about 500,000 m^{2} (5,400,000 sq ft), comprising 356 classrooms with approximately 27,382 seats, 203 teaching and computer laboratories with approximately 1,831 seats and 171 libraries and study rooms with approximately 4,417 seats.

=== Headquarters – City Centre Campus ===
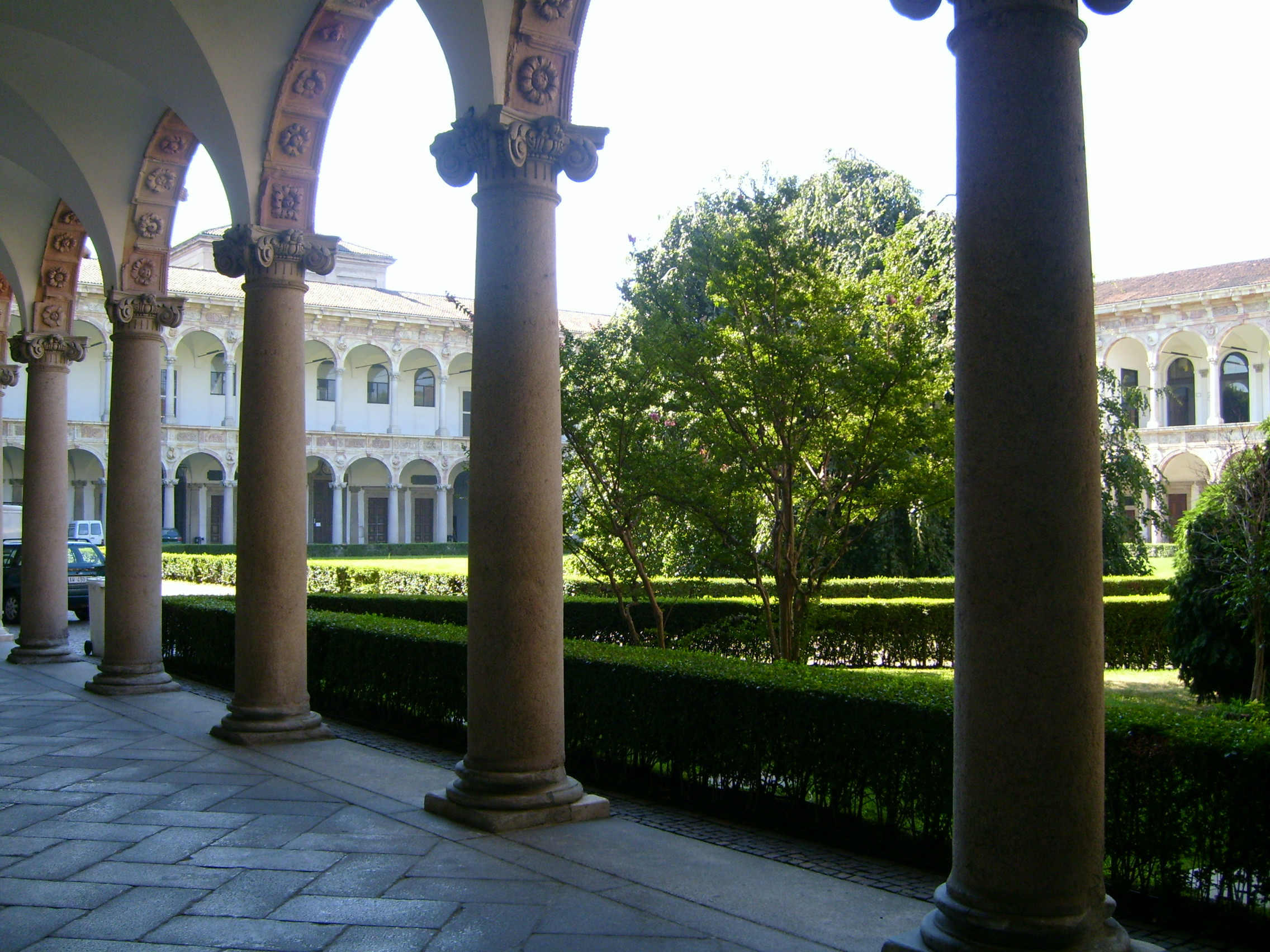
Chiostro maggiore della Ca’ Granda

Built in 1456 by Francesco I Sforza, Duke of Milan, the Ca’ Granda (The Great House) designed by Filarete is the headquarters of the University of Milan. It was originally named the Magna Domus Hospitalis (The Great House of the Hospital) and was the main building of the Policlinico of Milan, a large hospital complex established during the Renaissance period, which was later expanded with the addition of adjacent structures or nearby buildings in the city centre, close to the Milan Cathedral (Duomo di Milano). The historical buildings of the Policlinico of Milan underwent a careful restoration in the 20th and early 21st centuries. The Ca’ Granda was one of the first Renaissance buildings in Milan and had a large following throughout northern Italy.

The street where the Ca' Granda (in later centuries known as the Ospedale Maggiore) is located, Via Festa del Perdono, is named after the Feast of Pardon (25 March), a Milanese tradition celebrated every year since 25 March 1459, when Pope Pius II visited the hospital and conceded plenary indulgence to anyone who made a donation to support the Policlinico of Milan.

At present, the Ca' Granda is the seat of the Rectorate of the University of Milan and contains some of the main administrative offices; as well as the central library, lecture halls and auditoria of the School of Humanities and the School of Law.

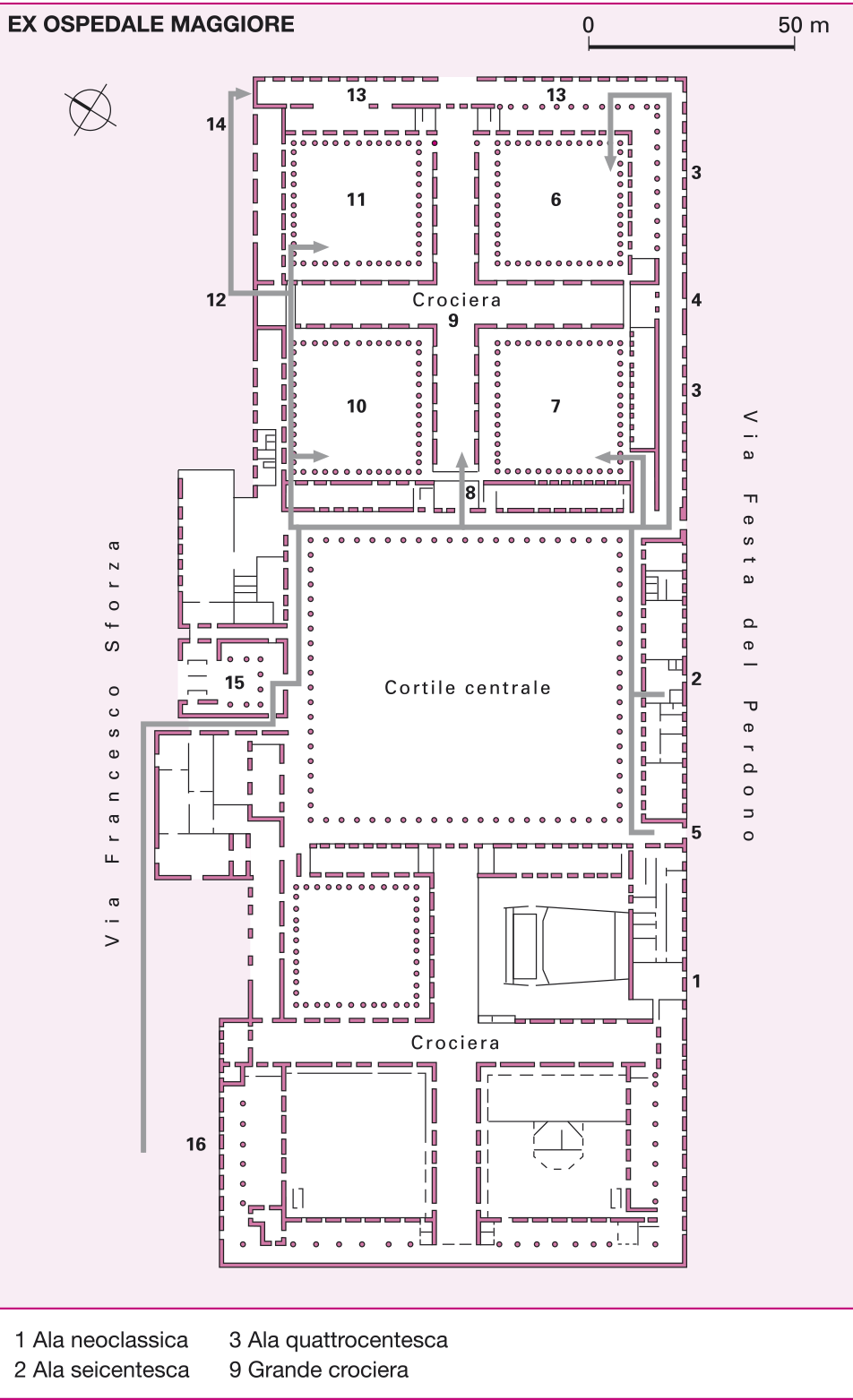
Plan of the University of Milan headquarters on Via Festa del Perdono, historically the Ca' Granda (Ospedale Maggiore) Hospital

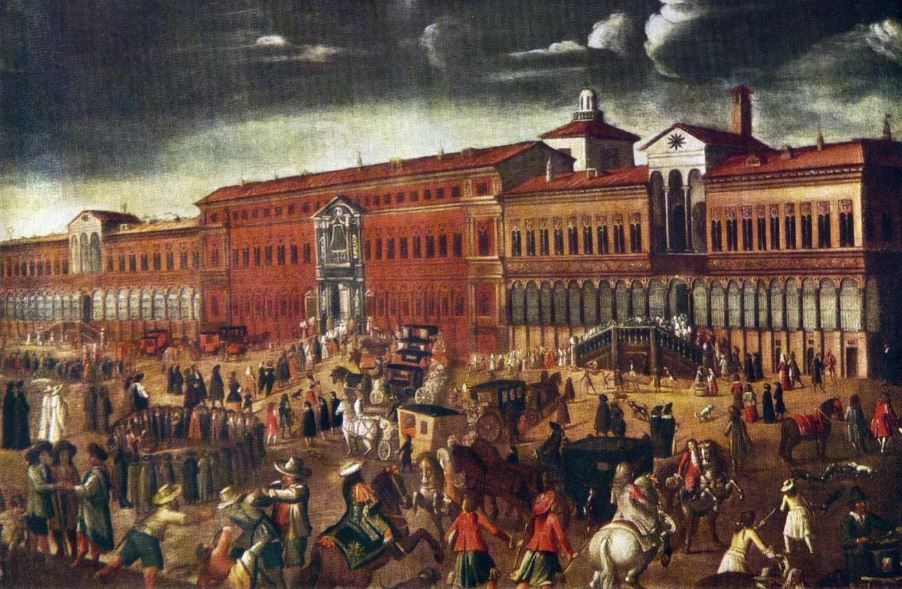
The Ca' Granda during a Festa del Perdono celebration in the 17th century

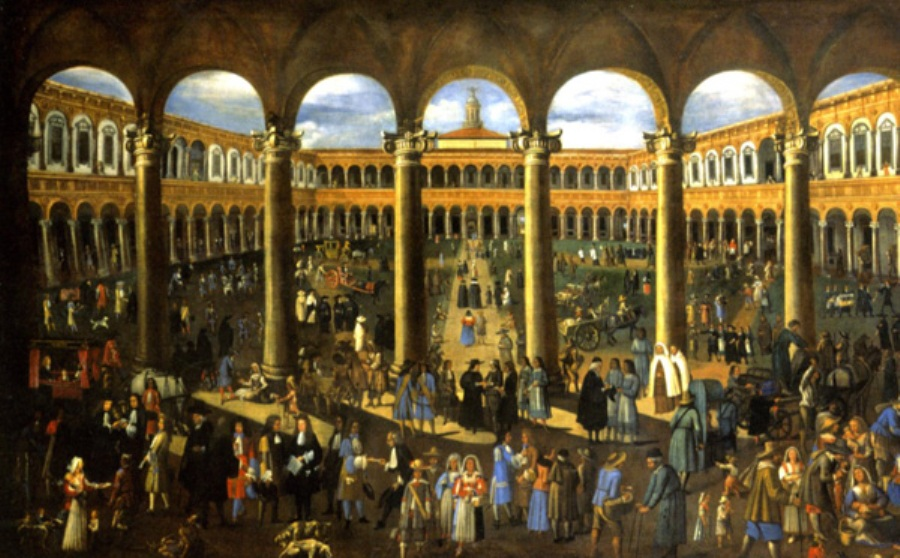
Cortile centrale of the Ca' Granda during a Festa del Perdono celebration in the 17th century

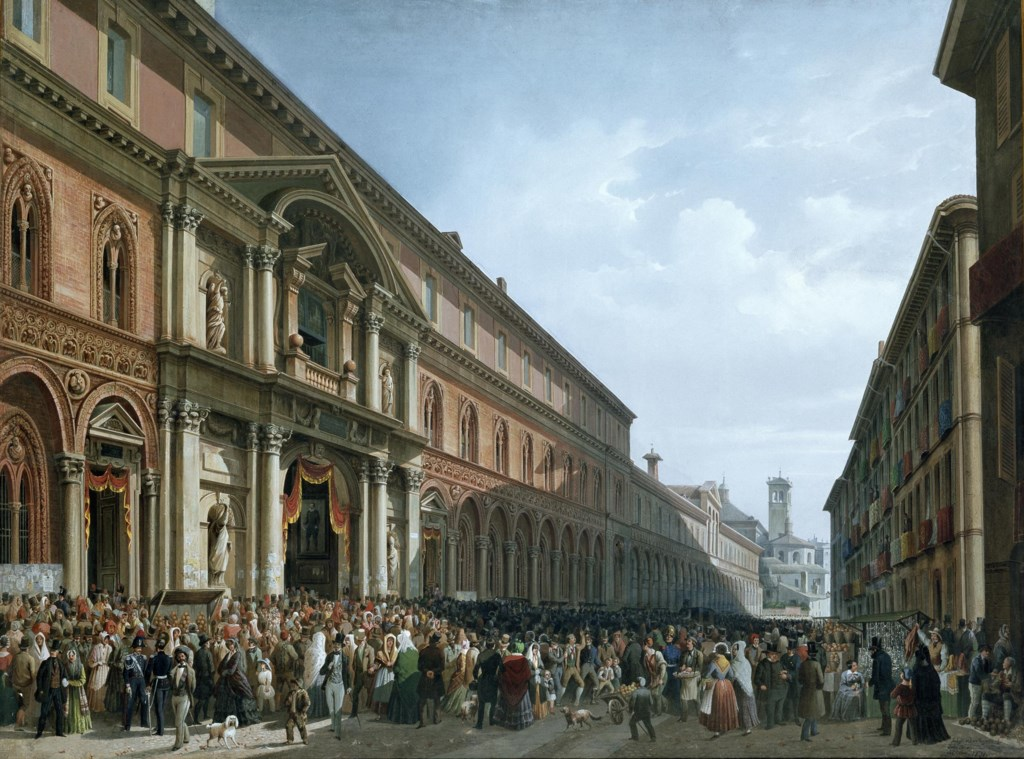
The Festa del Perdono celebration at the Ca' Granda (Ospedale Maggiore) on 25 March 1851

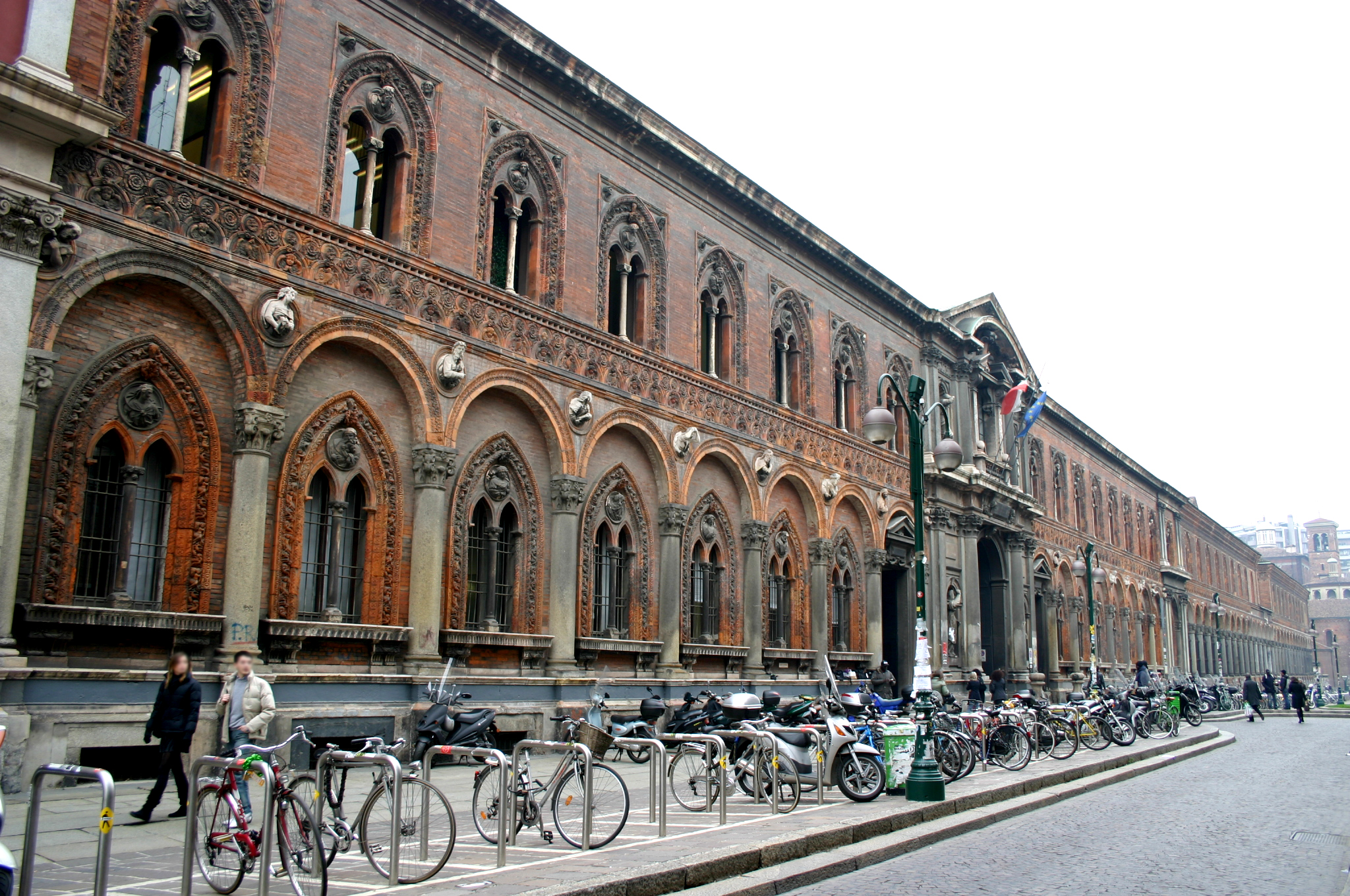
The Ca' Granda in 2007, before the facade was cleaned and restored

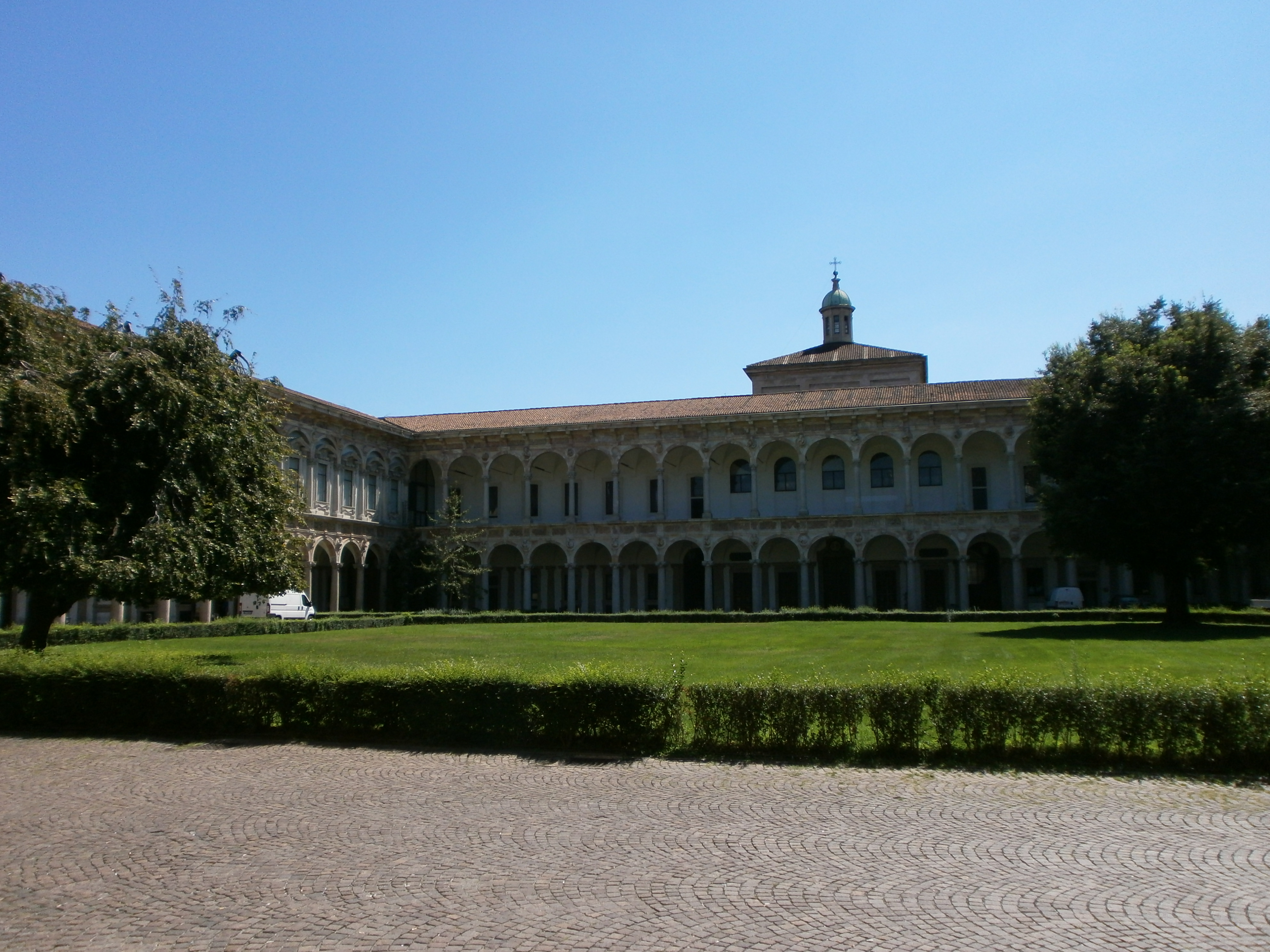
Cortile centrale

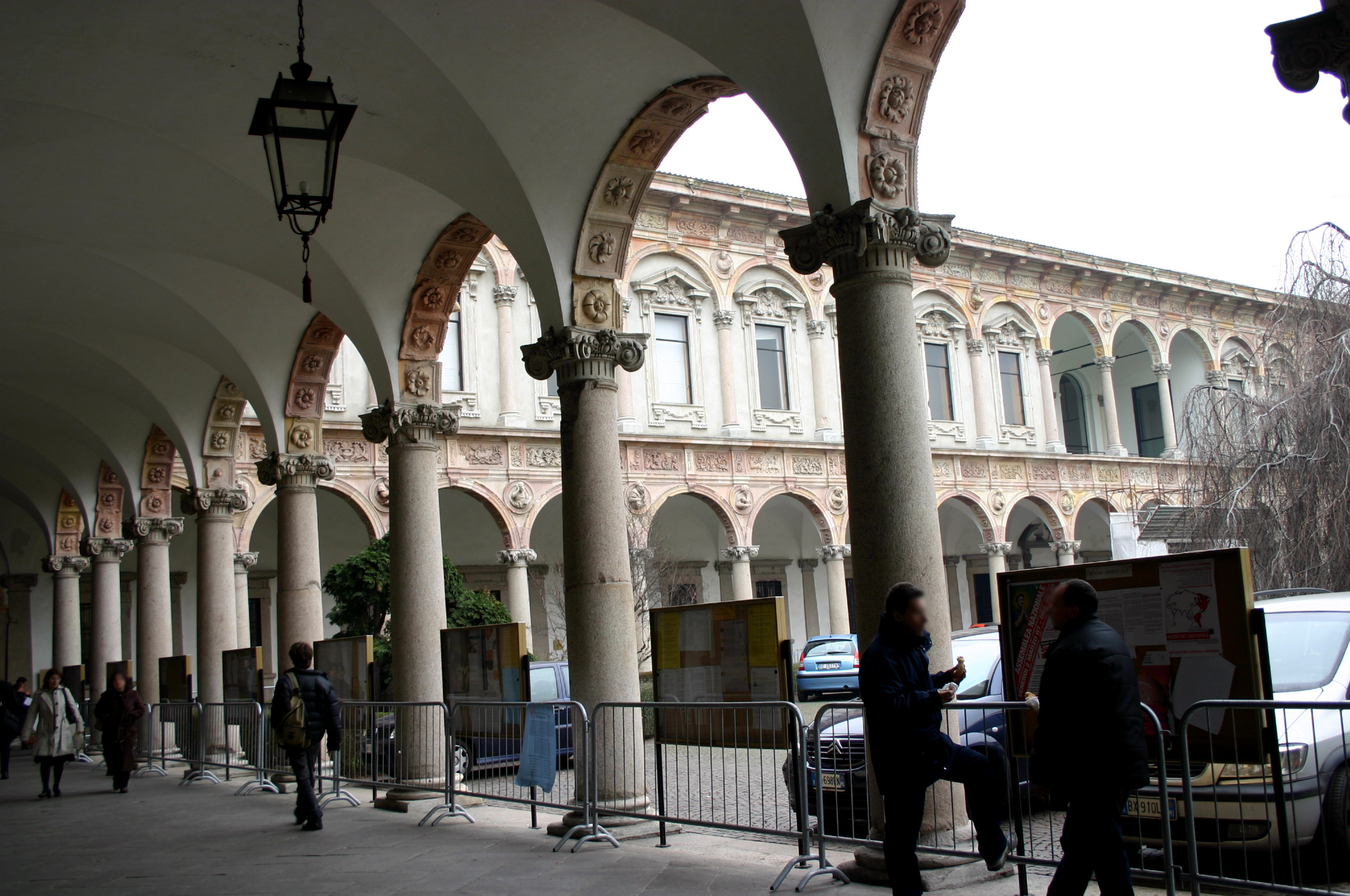
Chiostro maggiore

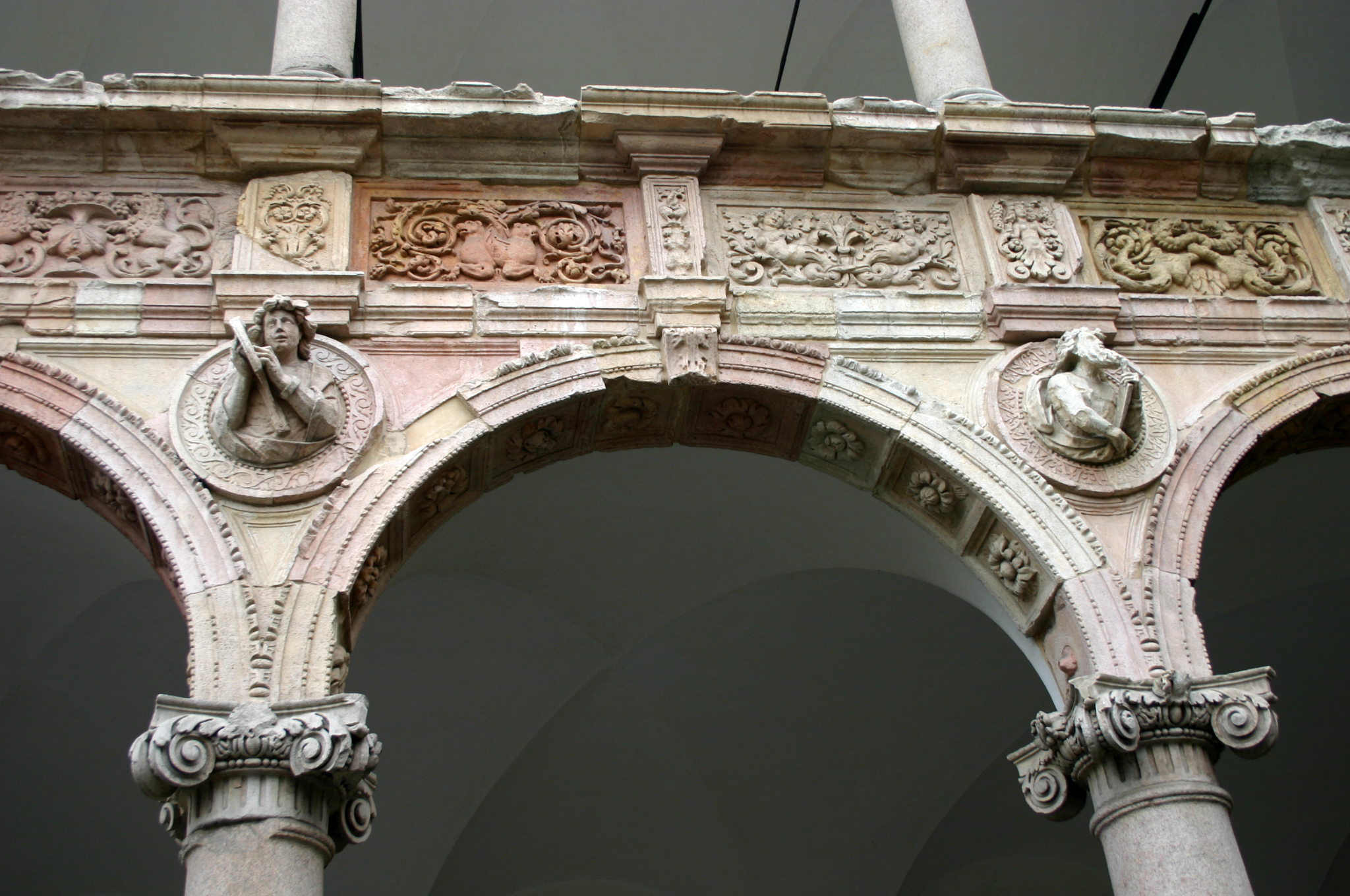
Chiostro maggiore

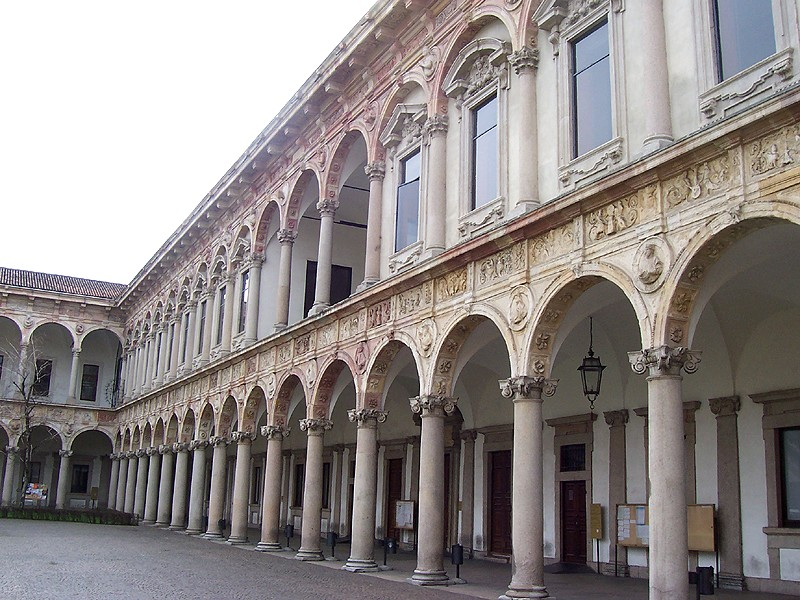
Chiostro maggiore

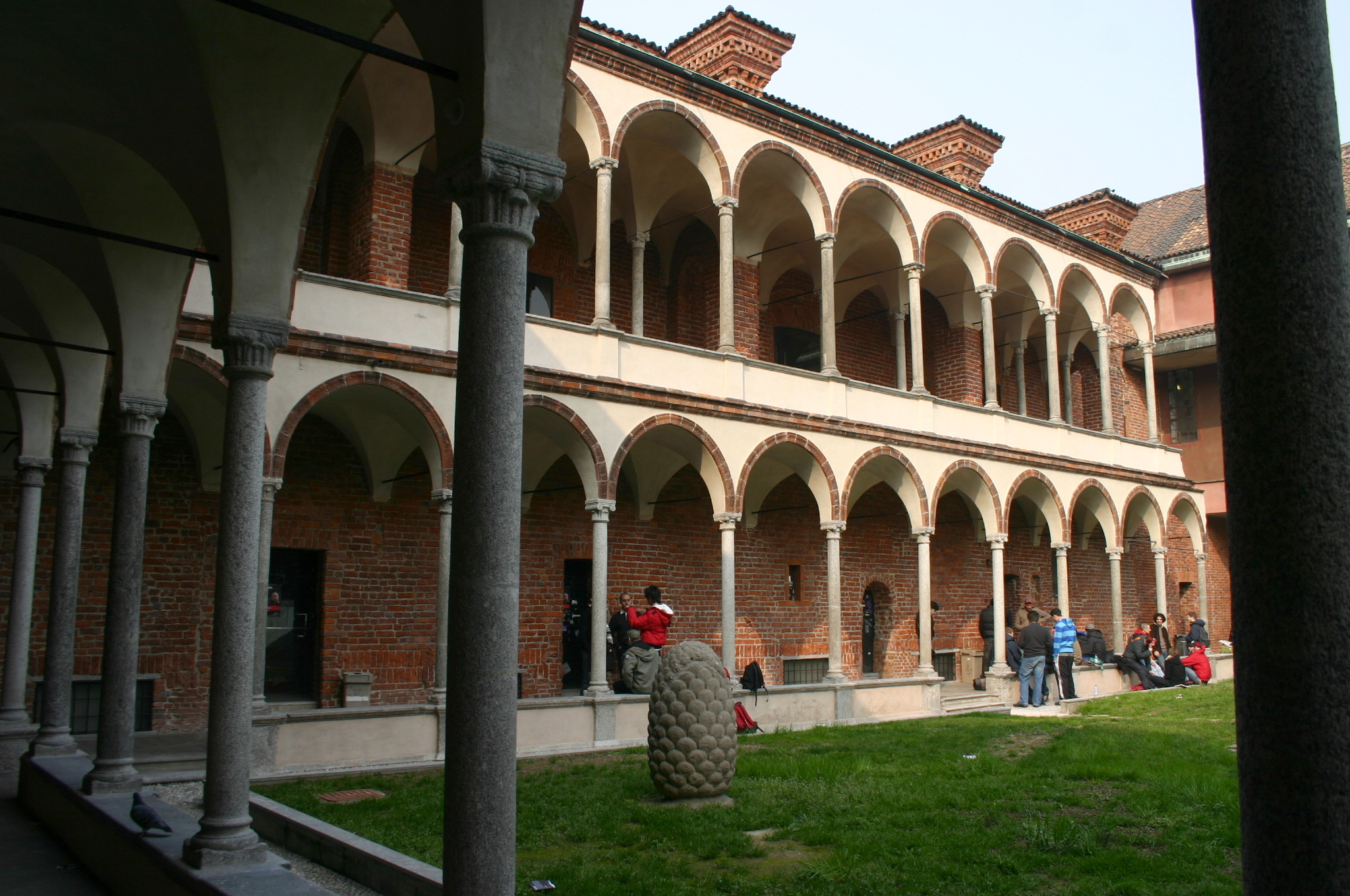
Chiostro della Ghiacciaia

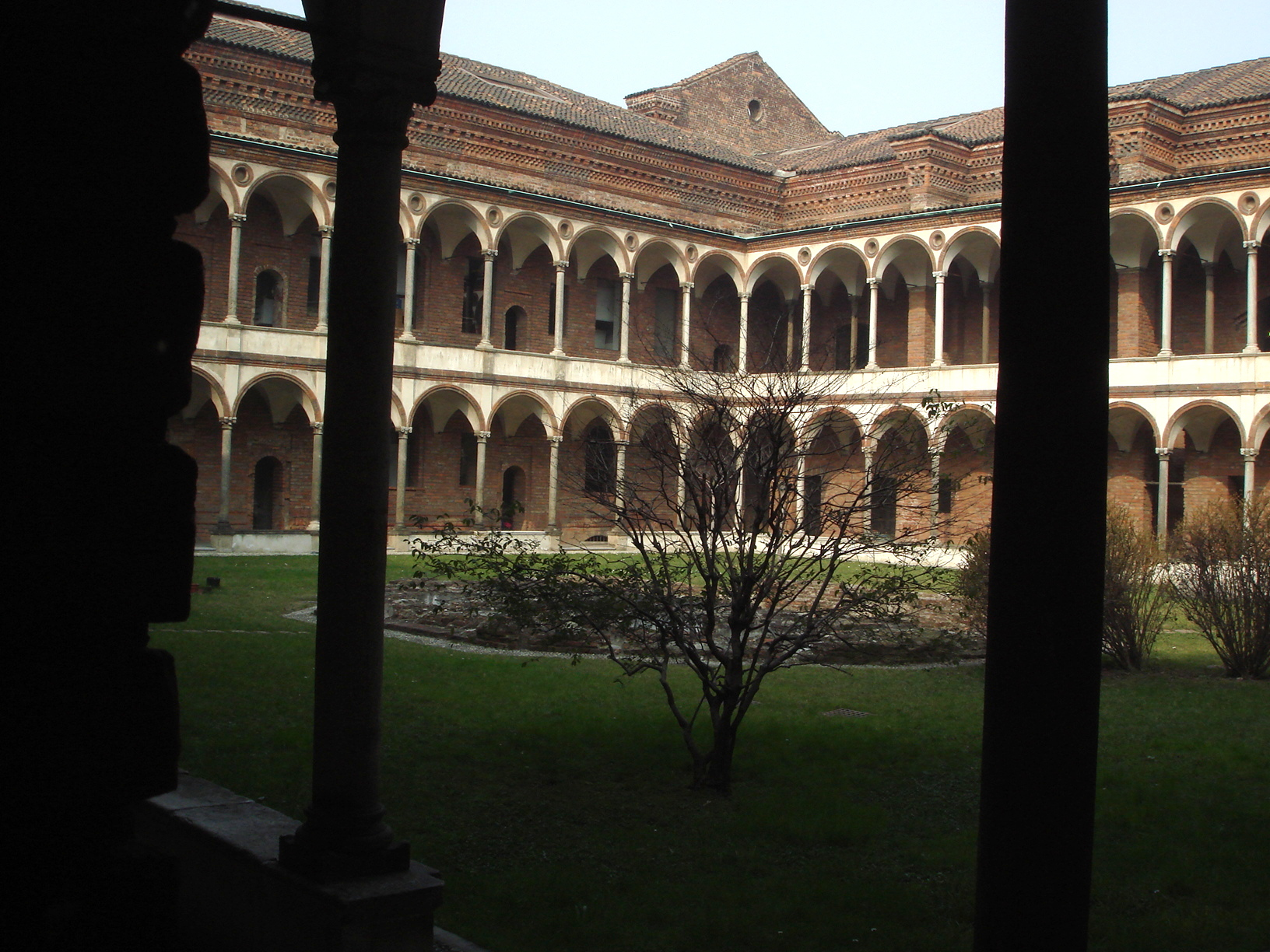
Chiostro dei Bagni

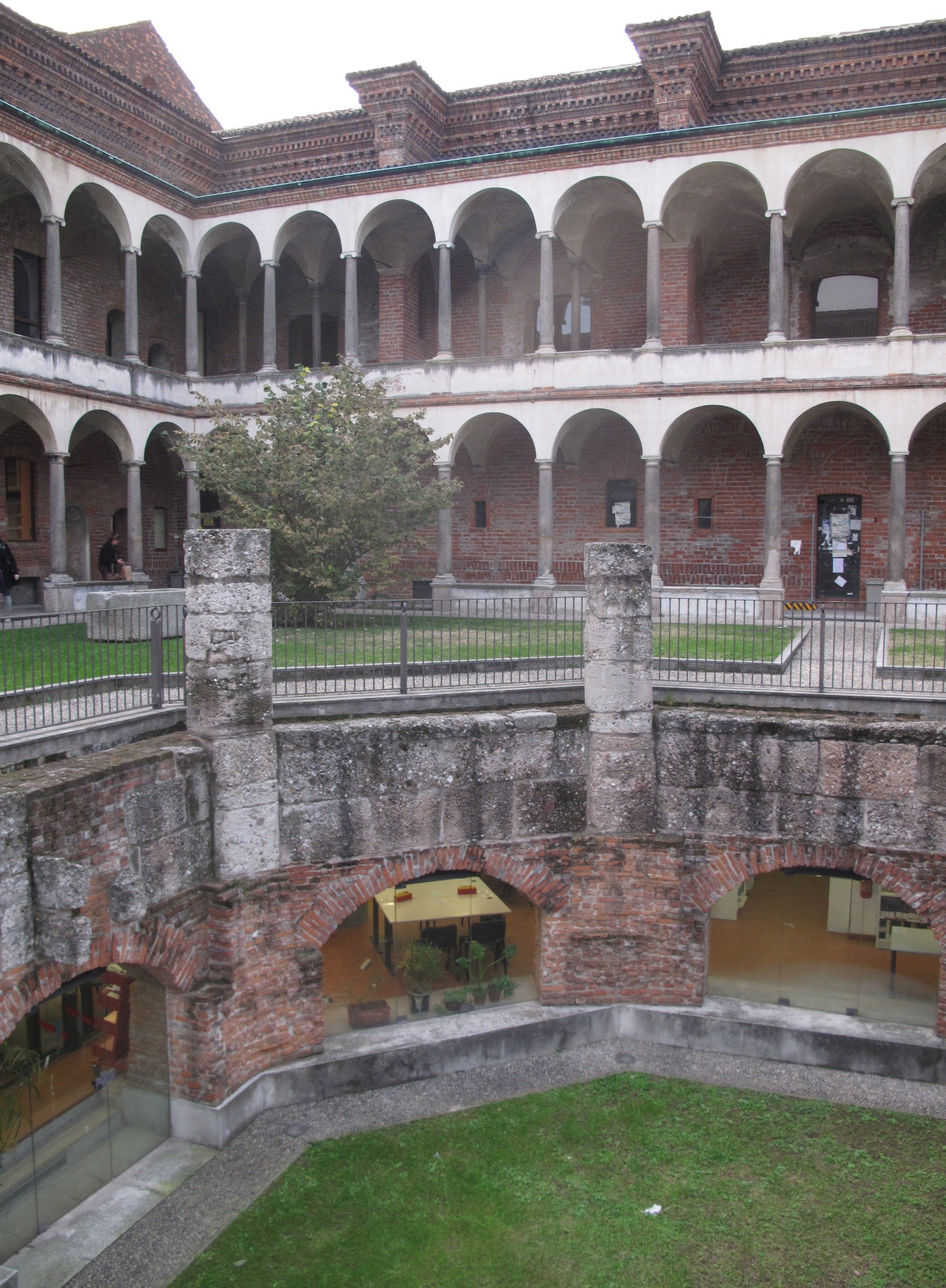
Chiostro della Legnaia

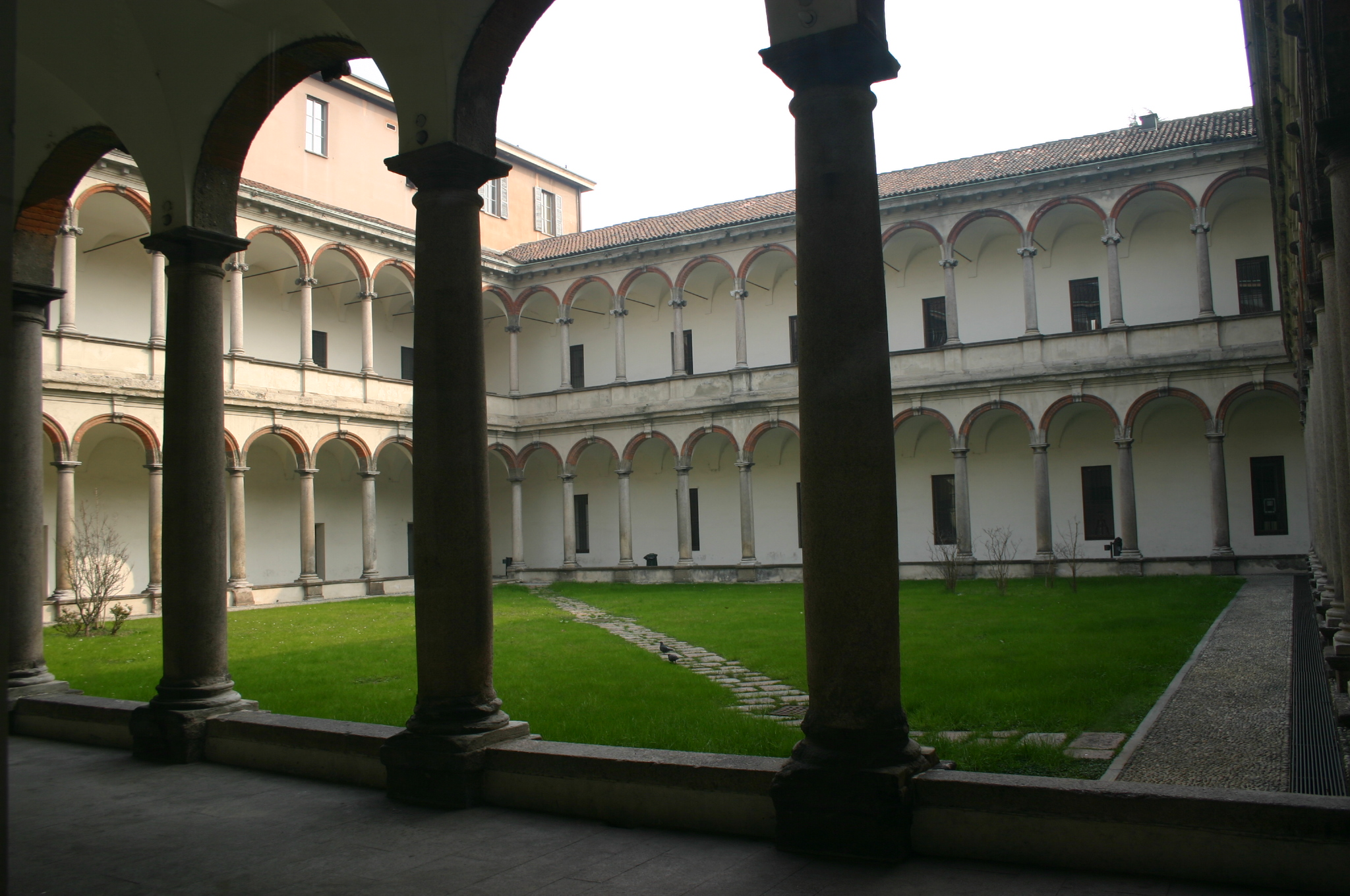
Chiostro del Settecento

=== Città Studi – Scientific Campus ===
Since the late 1960s, the exponential growth of the number of enrolled students forced the university to build other structures in the Città Studi neighbourhood, where the main buildings of all scientific schools and departments of the University of Milan are located, as well as the majority of the research facilities. The Polytechnic University of Milan is also located in this quarter.

The Città Studi Campus Sostenibile (CSCS, "Città Studi Sustainable Campus") is a joint project launched by the University of Milan and the Polytechnic University of Milan in 2011 to turn the Città Studi (the historic university quarter in the city, home to the main campuses of two of its largest universities) into a forum on issues of sustainable development, thereby creating a model for the city at large to follow.

Devised as six roundtables on areas of intervention – People, Energy, Education, Mobility, City, and Food and Health – the project aims to implement a series of best practices with the goal of improving the quality of life for those living in the university quarter, through projects, events and programmes.

=== Milan Innovation District – MIND ===
Australia-based Lendlease has been contracted to design, build and manage the MIND campus of the University of Milan by a resolution of the board of directors. The project for the new campus of the science schools and departments of the University of Milan, located in the Milan Innovation District (MIND) within the former Expo 2015 area, covers a total area of over 190,000 square meters. The new area will be shared with Human Technopole, Italy's new research institute for life sciences, and the new IRCSS Galeazzi Orthopedic Institute for Medicine. The project has a total value of approximately €338 million.

=== Hospital campuses ===
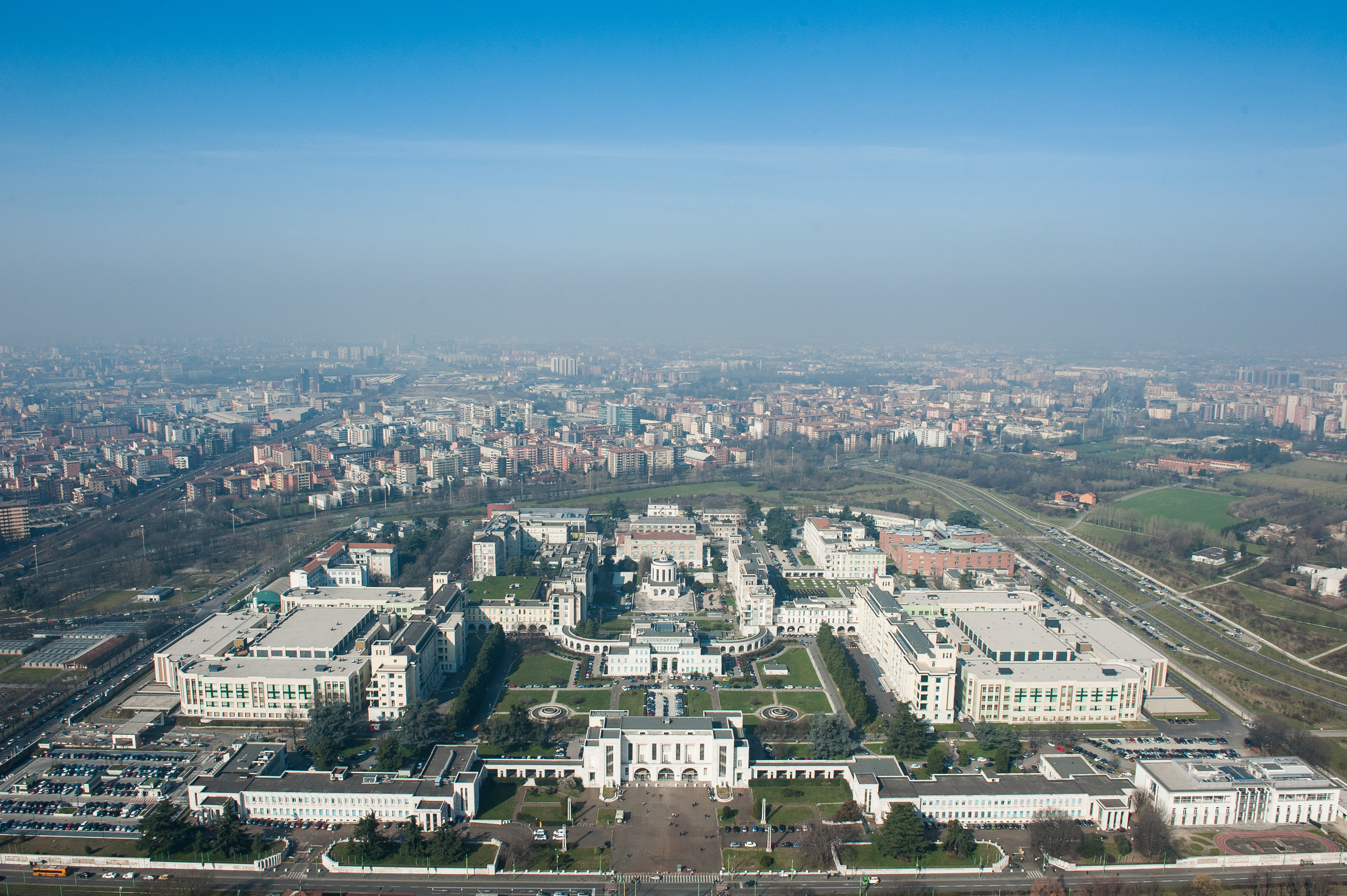
Ospedale Niguarda Ca' Granda in Milan

The Faculty of Medicine and Surgery (Facoltà di Medicina e Chirurgia) at the University of Milan has three Italian language medical schools and one English language medical school.

The Policlinico Hospital departments, the San Paolo Hospital departments, and the Sacco Hospital departments offer medicine courses in Italian.

The International Medical School (IMS) of the University of Milan is an English-language medical school with courses mainly taught at the Niguarda Ca' Granda Hospital.

The Faculty of Medicine and Surgery has teaching sectors at the following hospitals in Lombardy:

- IRCCS Ca 'Granda Foundation Maggiore Policlinico Hospital
- "San Paolo" Hospital
- "Luigi Sacco" Hospital
- IRCCS San Donato Polyclinic
- "San Giuseppe" Hospital
- Gaetano Pini Orthopedic Institute
- IRCCS Monzino Cardiology Center
- IRCCS National Cancer Institute Foundation
- IRCCS Galeazzi Orthopedic Institute
- IRCCS "Santa Maria Nascente" - Don Carlo Gnocchi Foundation
- IFOM-IEO Campus
- "San Carlo Borromeo" Hospital
- Niguarda Ca 'Granda Hospital
- "Fatebenefratelli" Hospital

=== Outside Milan ===
The Faculty of Veterinary Medicine, and the University of Milan Centre for Clinical Veterinary Medicine and Experimental Zootechny are located outside the city area, in Lodi. The Department of Studies in Language Mediation and Intercultural Communication is instead located in Sesto San Giovanni.

== Rankings ==
University rankings

Global – Overall
- ARWU World: 151–200 (2025)
- QS World: =270 (2027)
- THE World: 301–350 (2026)
- USNWR Global: =150 (2026)

National – Overall
- ARWU National: 2–3 (2025)
- USNWR National: 3 (2026)

The University of Milan is one of the twelve founding members (2002) and the only Italian member of the League of European Research Universities (LERU), an elite group of 24 research-intensive European universities, as of 2026.

In 2020, the University of Milan ranked first in Italy (three-way tie) according to the Academic Ranking of World Universities (ARWU), sharing the place with the University of Pisa and Sapienza University of Rome.

In 2026 the University of Milan ranked 1st in Italy and 65th in the world in the field of Medicine according to the QS World University Rankings. The Faculty of Medicine and Surgery at the University of Milan consistently ranks among the world's top 100 medical schools. According to the global rankings of the USNWR in 2025, the University of Milan ranked 15th in the world in Gastroenterology and Hepatology, 43rd in Oncology, 53rd in Surgery, Pharmacology and Toxicology, 54th in Clinical medicine, 64th in Radiology, Nuclear medicine and Medical imaging, 68th in Cardiology and Cardiovascular systems, 77th in Infectious diseases, 78th in Endocrinology and Metabolism, 80th in Neuroscience and Behavioural sciences, and 98th in Immunology.

The university consistently ranks as Italy's best university in a number of areas. According to ANVUR, the University of Milan ranked first among Italian universities in the areas of political science, sociology, law, and philosophy in 2017. It also ranked among the top three in economics and statistics, earth science, history, and antiquities. The university has also been ranked first in Italy by ANVUR for the quality of scientific research in the period between 2015–2019.

In 2025 the university was ranked third in Italy by the Center for World University Rankings (CWUR), while the Times Higher Education World University Rankings ranked it sixth to ninth (tied with four other universities).

== Publishing ==
Since before 2009, the University of Milan has published journals in Open access, of which about ten have already been included in the Directory of Open access journals. There are numerous journals which focus on various fields of scientific interest (e.g. for linguistics and philology, the ItalianoLinguaDue and Carte Romance are among the available Open access journals).

== Budget ==
In 2010, income – excluding special accounting and clearing entries – amounted to €562 million, primarily from:

- State: €331 million for normal running costs
- Students: €91 million in the form of fees and contributions
- Public and private institutions: €59 million for research activities

== Sports, arts and entertainment ==
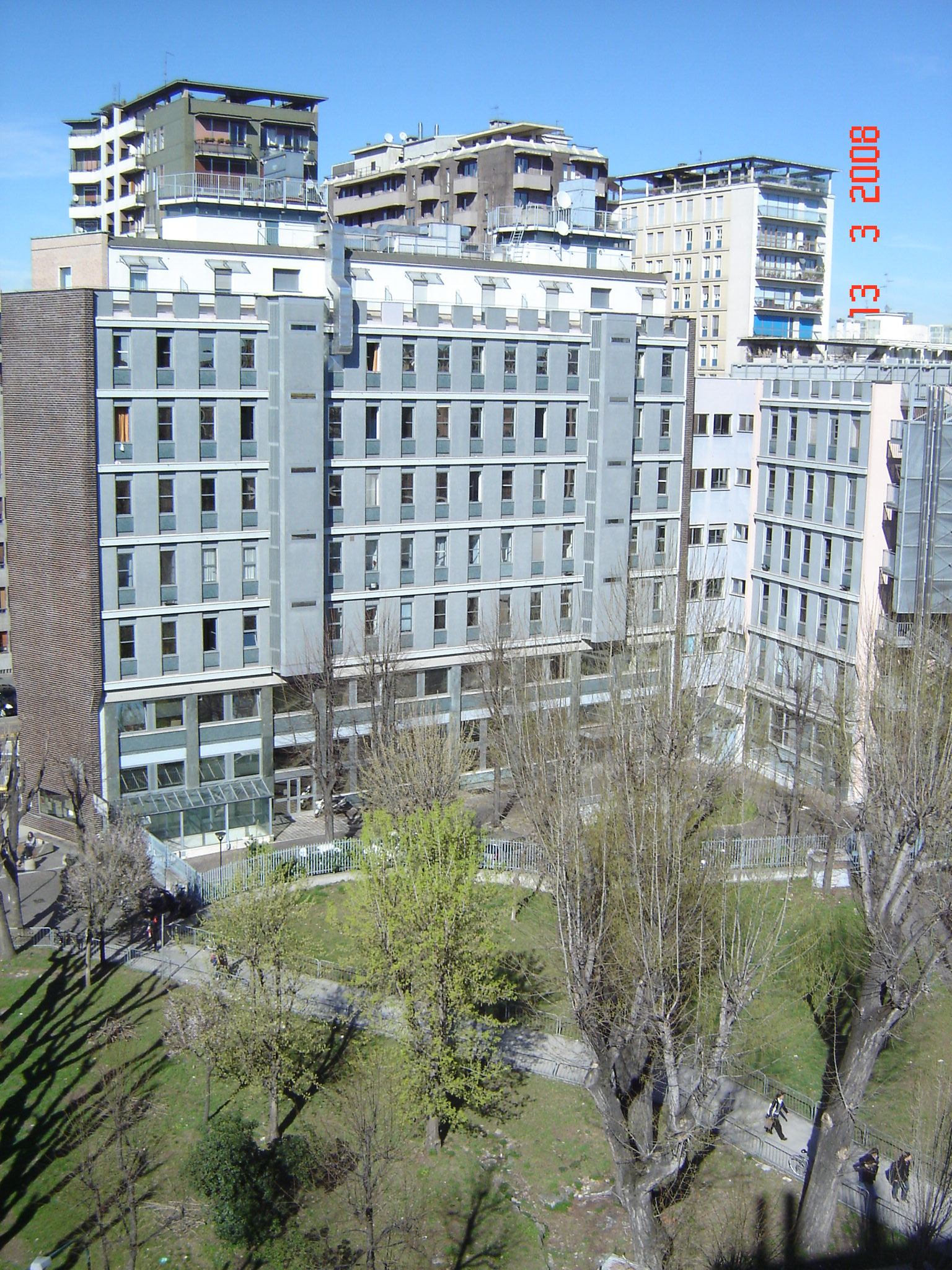
Student dormitory

=== Sporting activities ===
Centro Universitario Sportivo (CUS), University Sports Centre, is an amateur sports association which, for the last 60 years, has promoted the practice of physical education and sport by students and university collaborators. Every year, the centre organises a vast range of sports courses, which cover everything from traditional disciplines, such as swimming and athletics, to more modern activities, such as hydro-biking, yoga and capoeira.

=== Arts and entertainment ===
University of Milan students can take part in music and theatre initiatives organised by the university's resident cultural institutions, which include the Orchestra, the Choir and the CUT, the University Theatre Centre. The University of Milan Orchestra offers students the possibility to audition for a classical music ensemble in collaboration with the "Giuseppe Verdi" Conservatory of Milan and with the direction of Maestro Alessandro Crudele.

The University Choir is composed of university staff, students, professors and enthusiasts from outside the university. It is possible to become a member by passing an audition.

The Centro Universitario Teatrale (CUT), University Theatre Centre, is currently directed by Professor Alberto Bentoglio and collaborates actively with groups of university students who have been involved in theatre productions for several years.

=== Concessions for cultural activities ===
The university works closely with cinema, theatre, dance and music agents, to provide their students and collaborators with access to cultural initiatives and services at reduced prices.

== Notable alumni ==
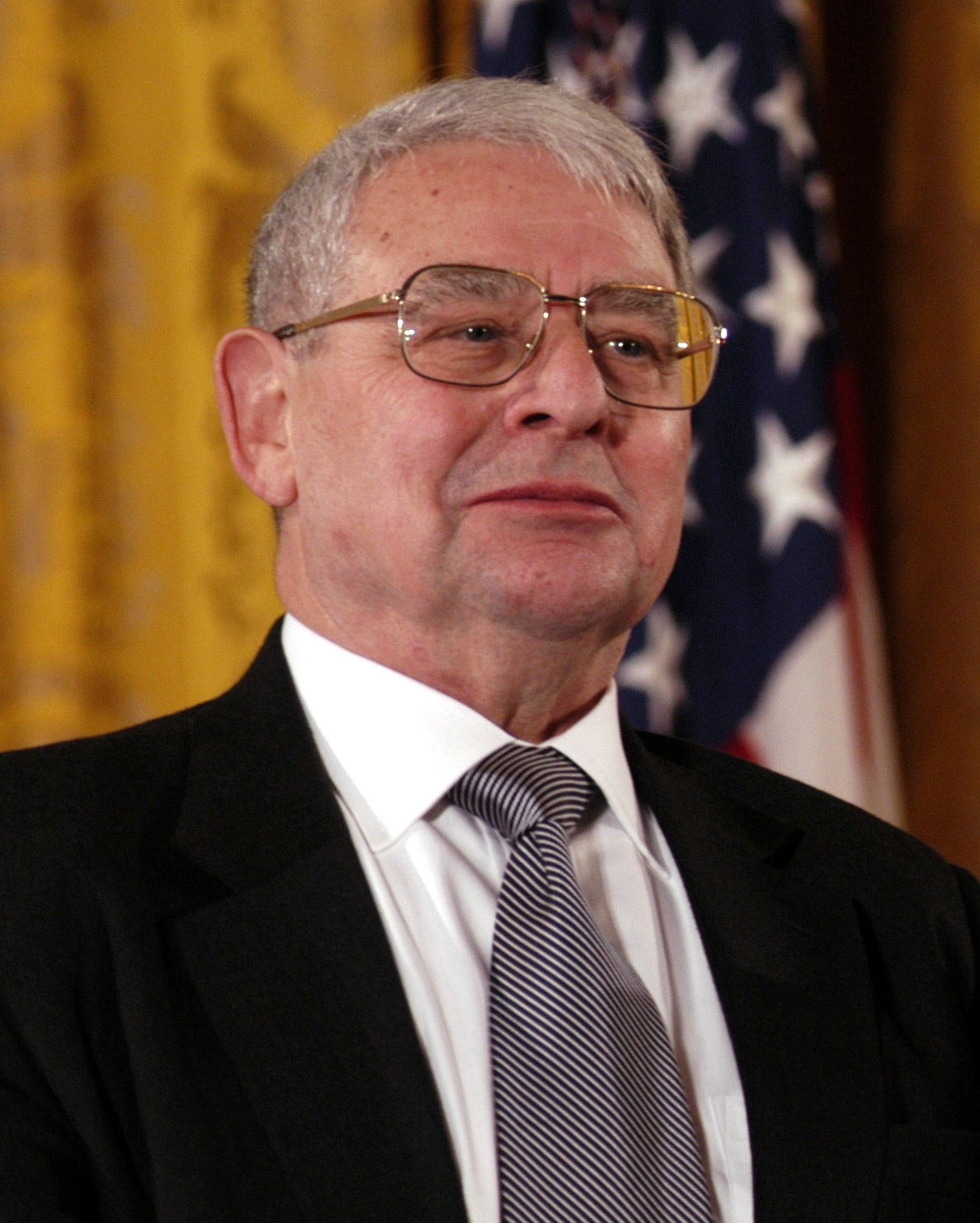
Riccardo Giacconi, Nobel Laureate in Physics (2002) and Wolf Prize in Physics (1987)

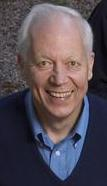
Enrico Bombieri, Fields Medal recipient (1974)

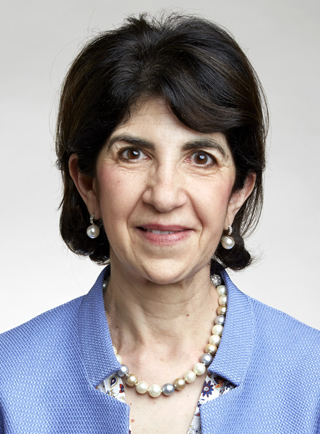
Fabiola Gianotti, two times CERN General Director, Bruno Pontecorvo Prize (2019)

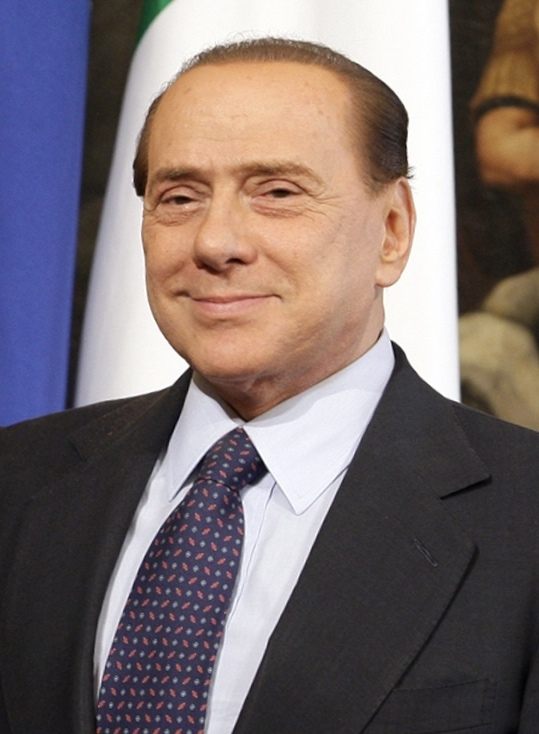
Silvio Berlusconi, 4 times former Italian Prime Minister and President of the European Council

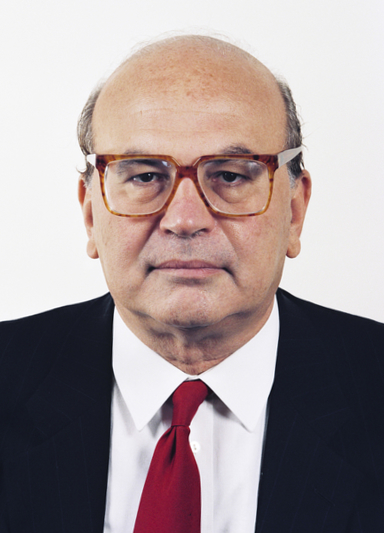
Bettino Craxi, former Italian Prime Minister and President of the European Council

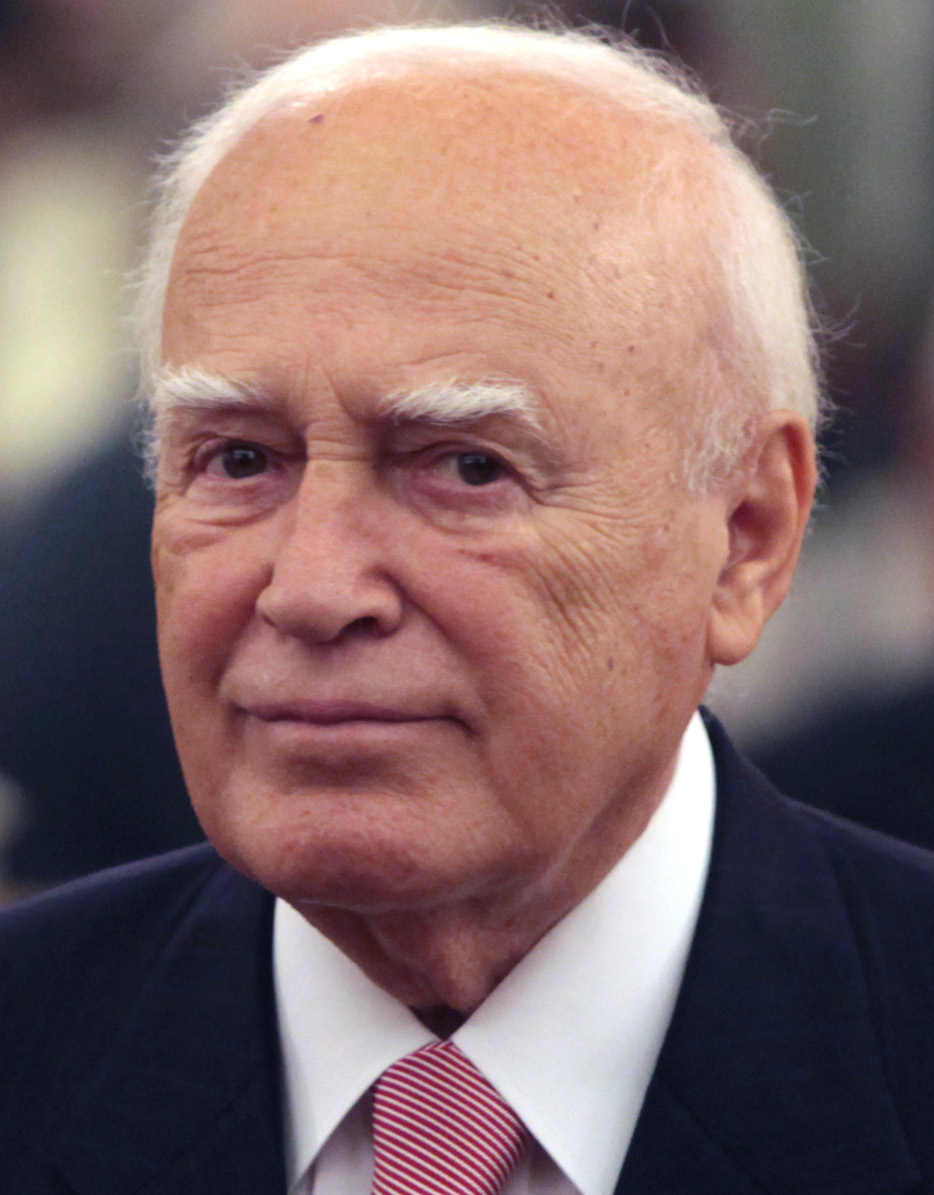
Karolos Papoulias, former President of Greece and Minister of Foreign Affairs

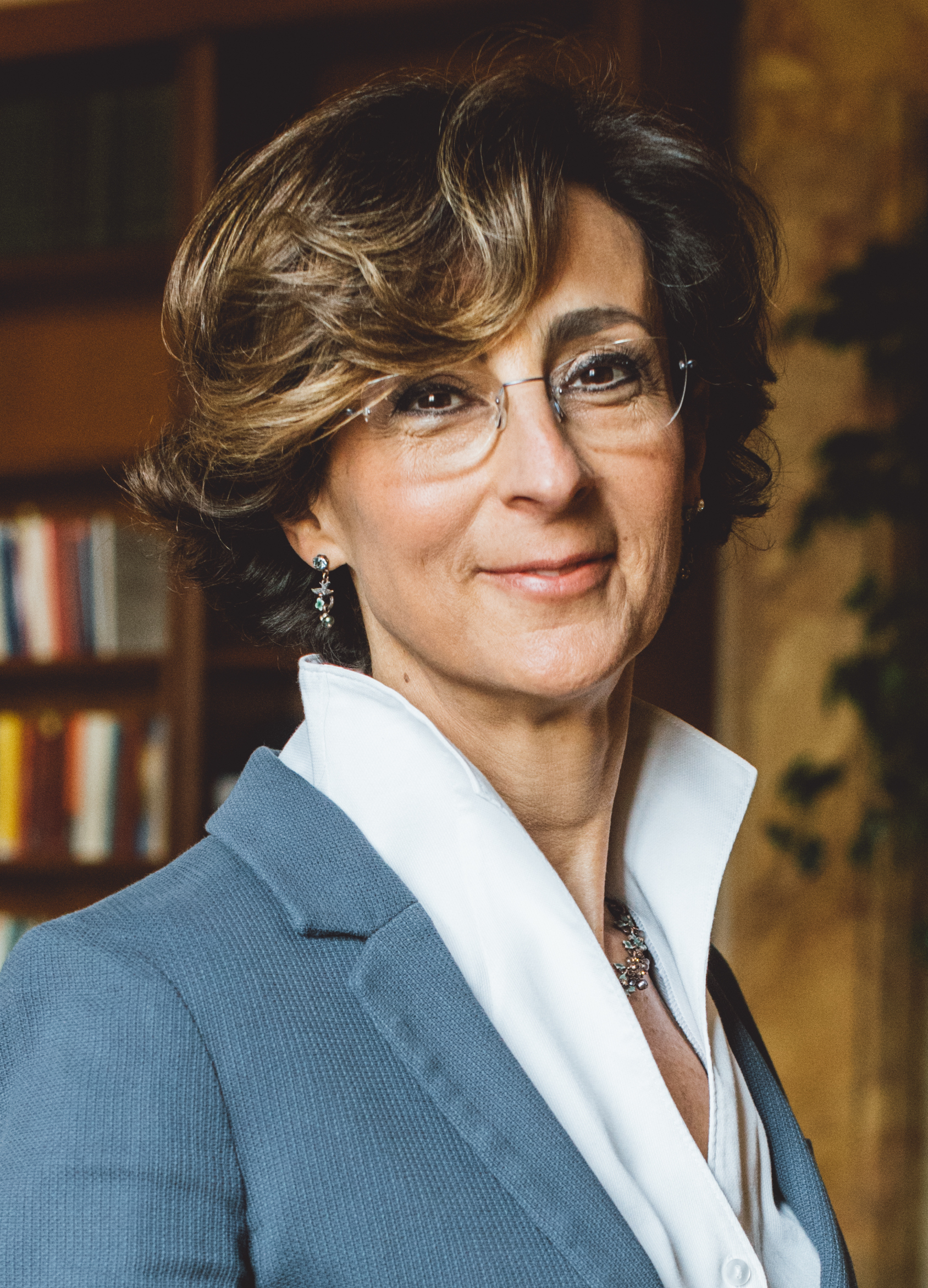
Marta Cartabia, former President of the Constitutional Court

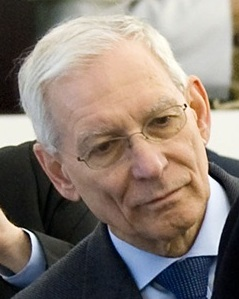
Valerio Onida, former President of the Constitutional Court

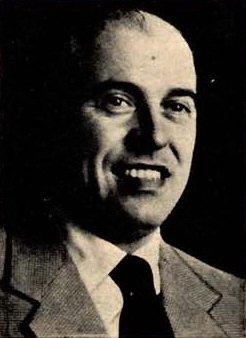
Carlo Ponti, film producer and lawyer

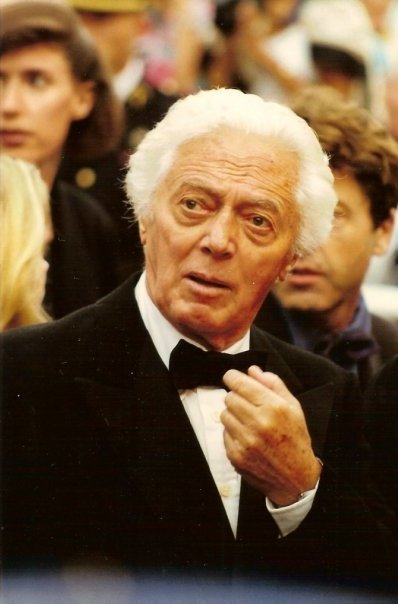
Dino Risi, film director and medical doctor

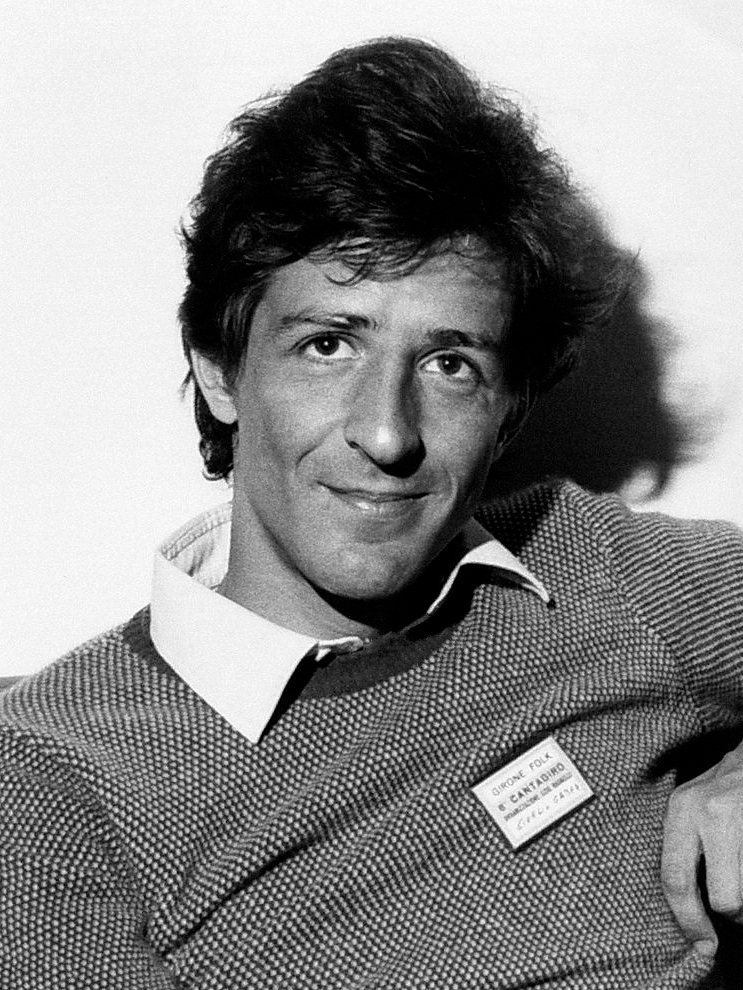
Giorgio Gaber, singer-composer, guitarist, actor, playwright and theatre director

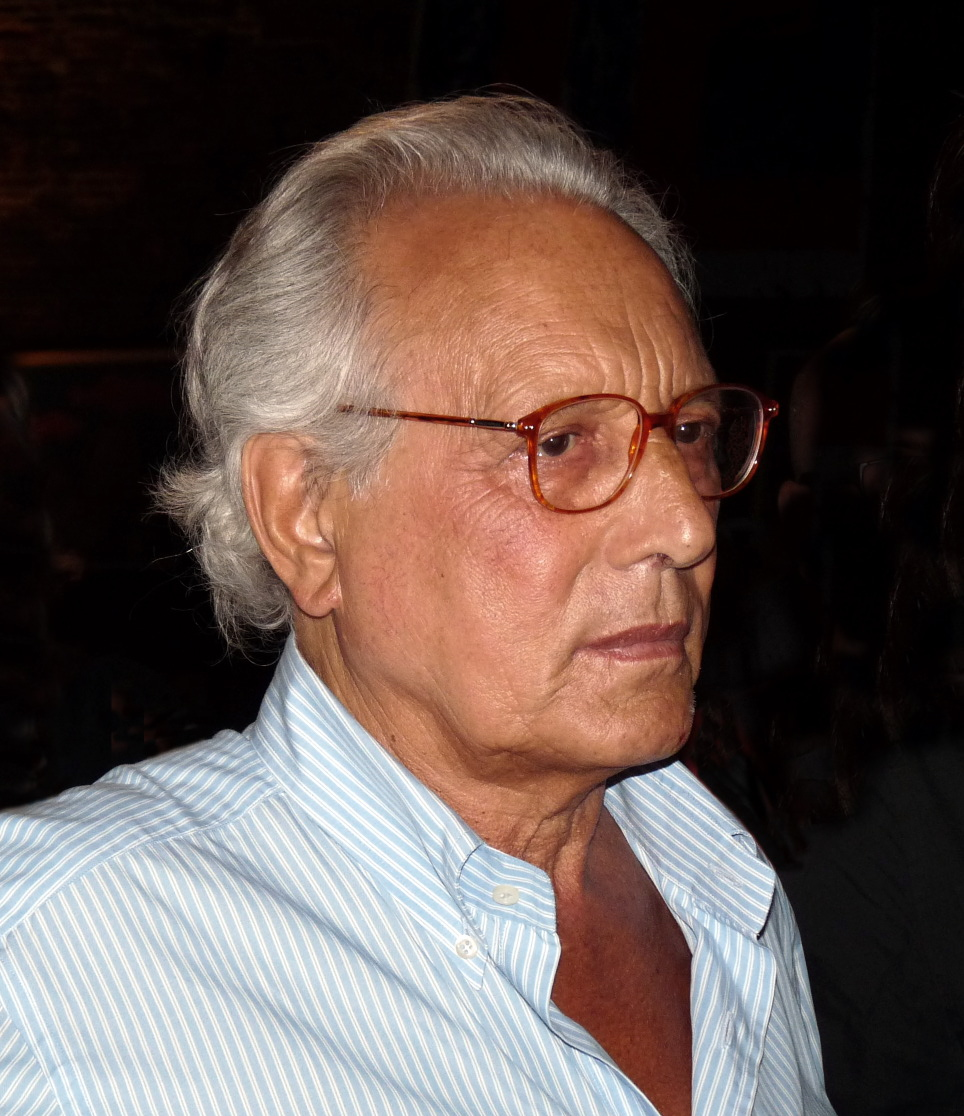
Enzo Jannacci, singer-composer, pianist, actor, playwright and cardiac surgeon

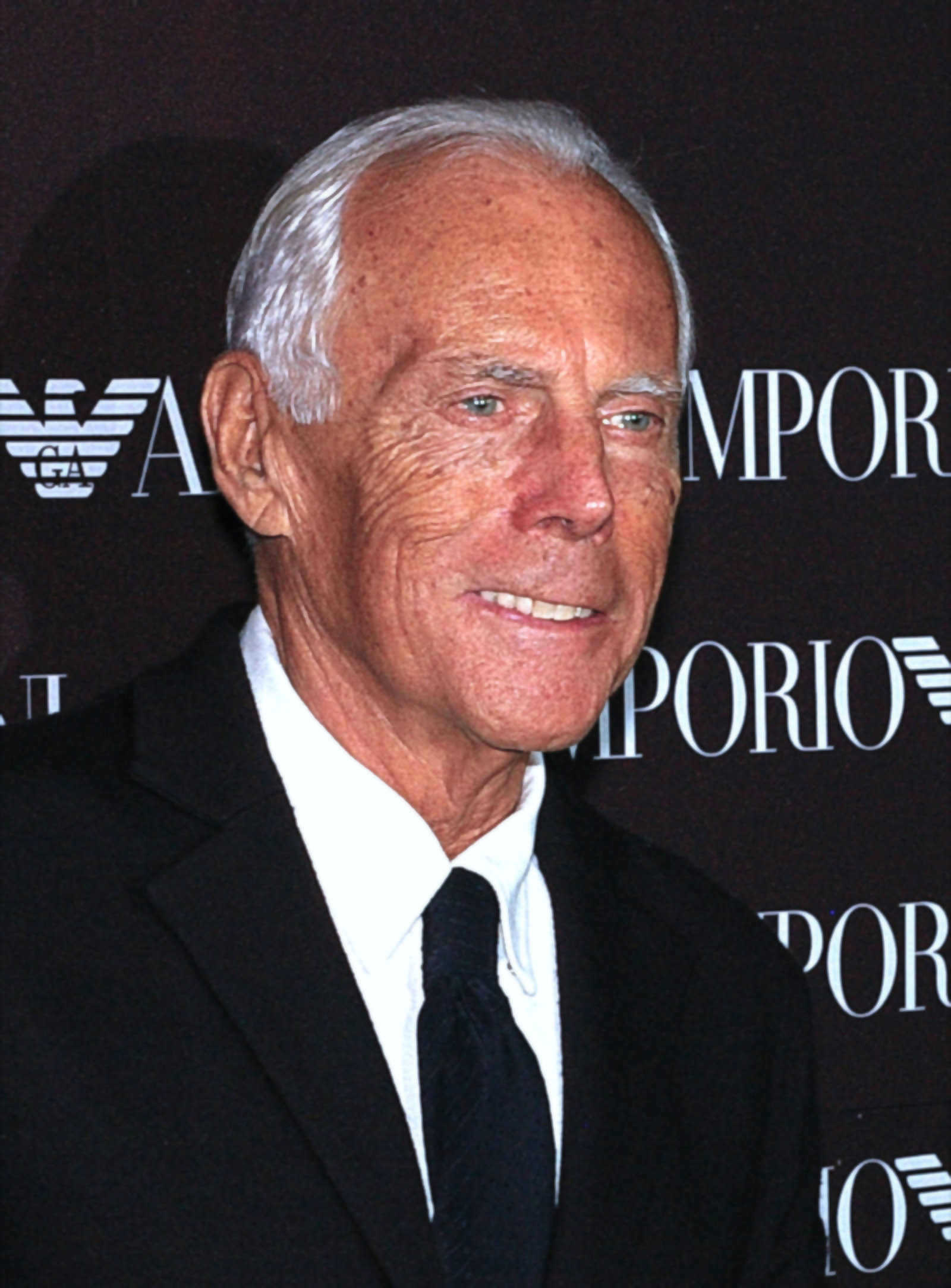
Giorgio Armani, stylist

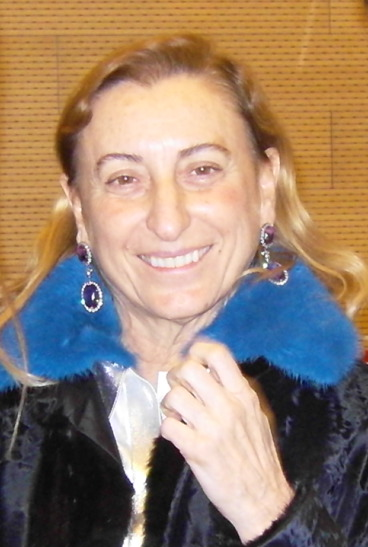
Miuccia Prada, stylist

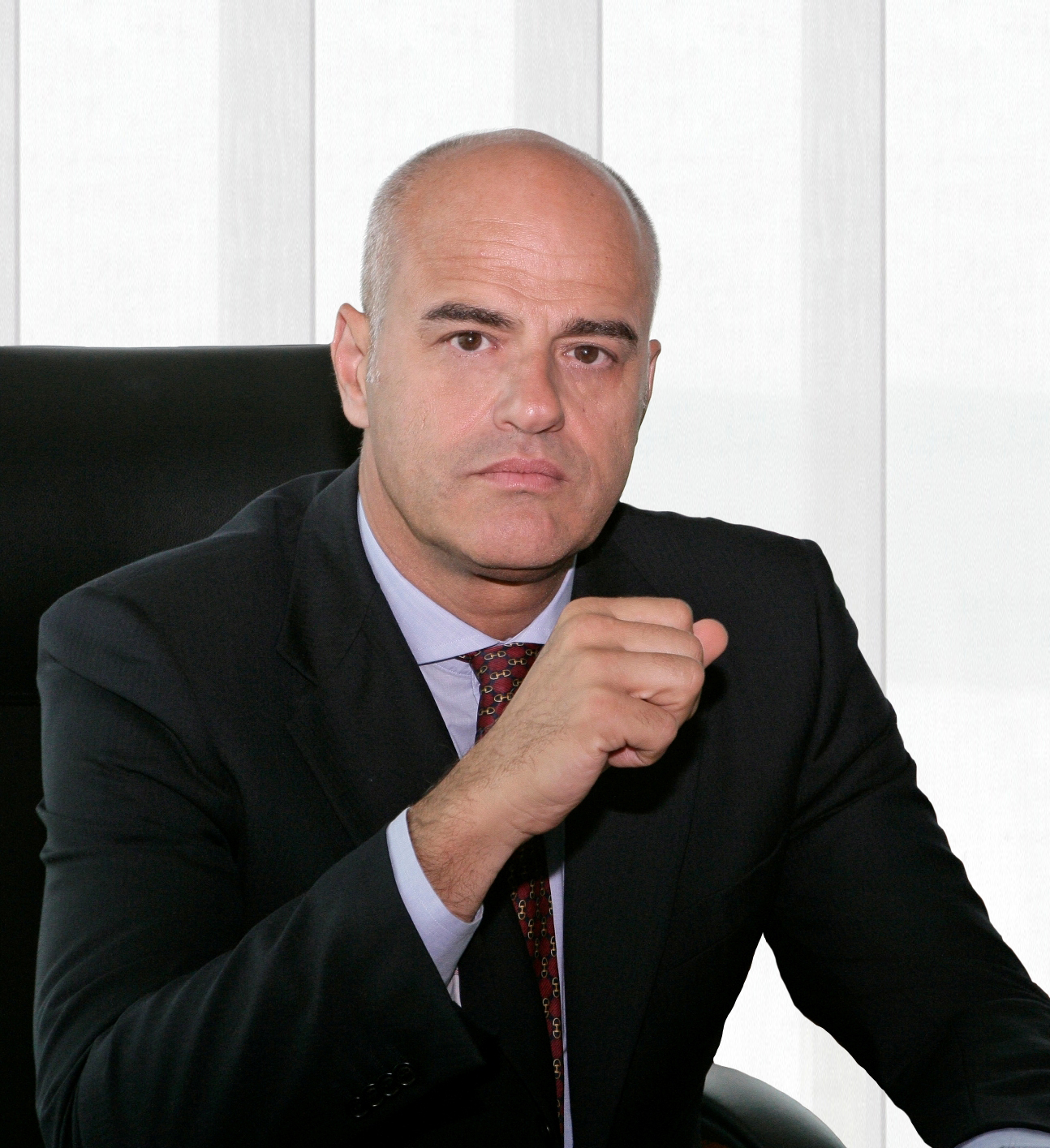
Claudio Descalzi, Eni CEO

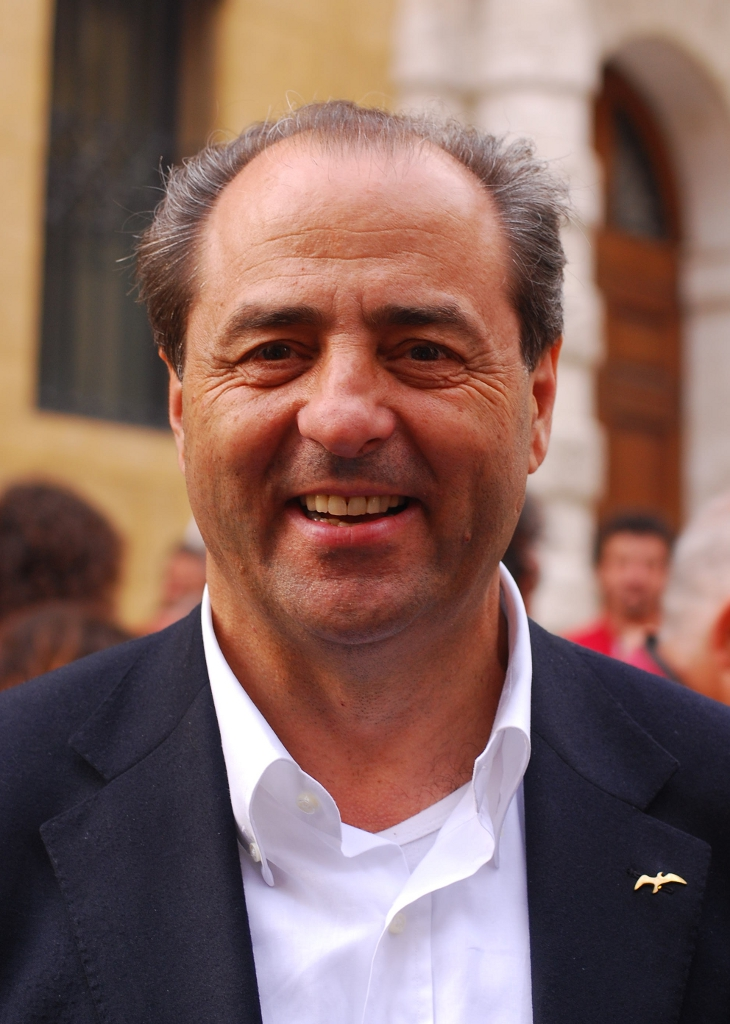
Antonio Di Pietro, minister and prosecutor in the Mani Pulite corruption trials

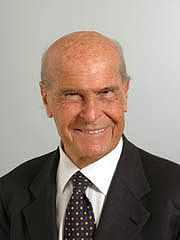
Umberto Veronesi, surgical oncologist and former minister

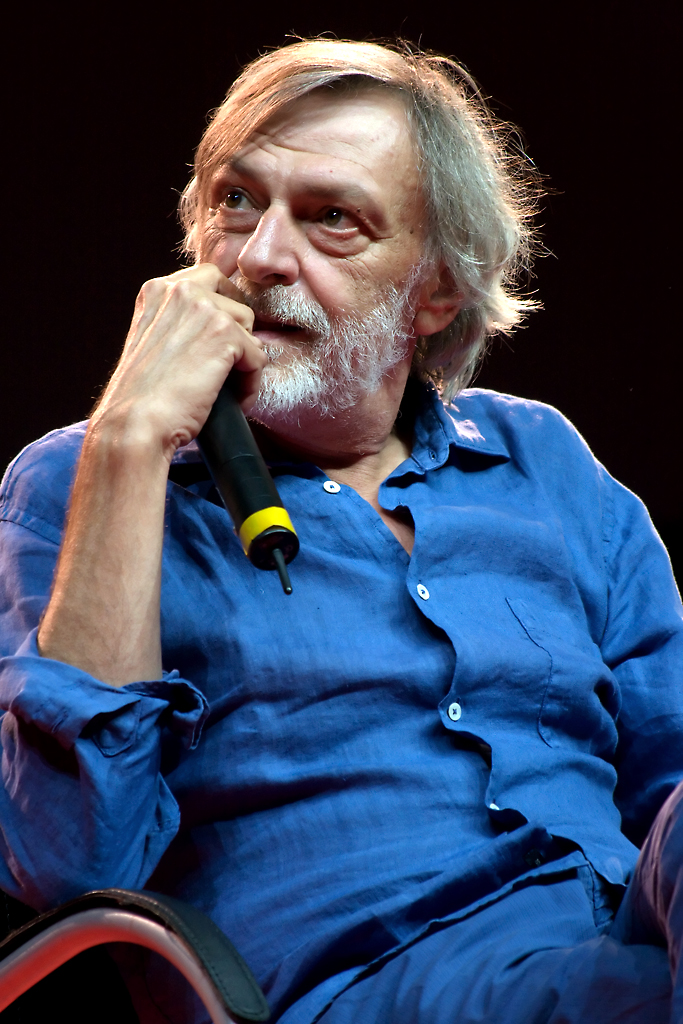
Gino Strada, surgeon, activist and founder of Emergency

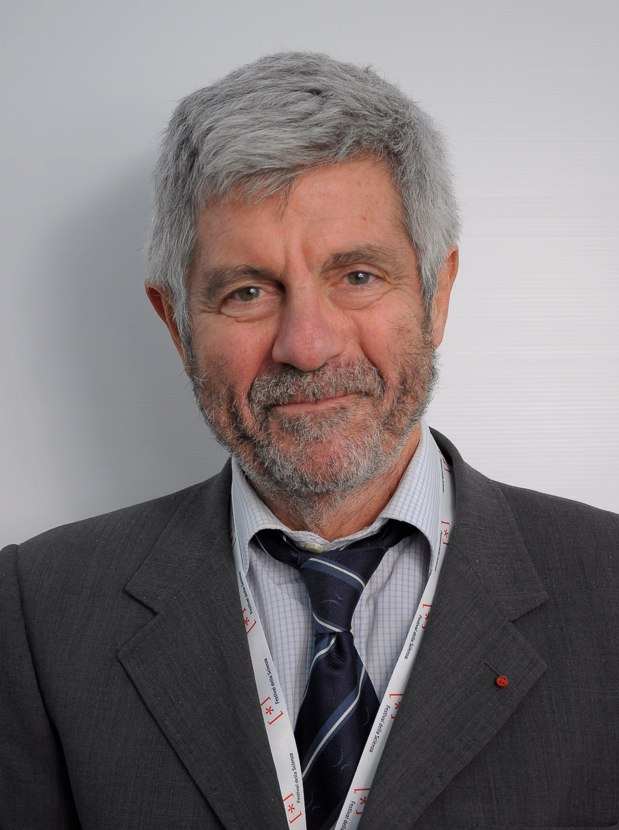
Giovanni Bignami, astrophysicist, Bruno Rossi Prize (1993)

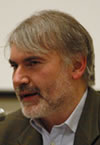
Marco Bersanelli, astrophysicist, Gruber Prize in Cosmology (2006)

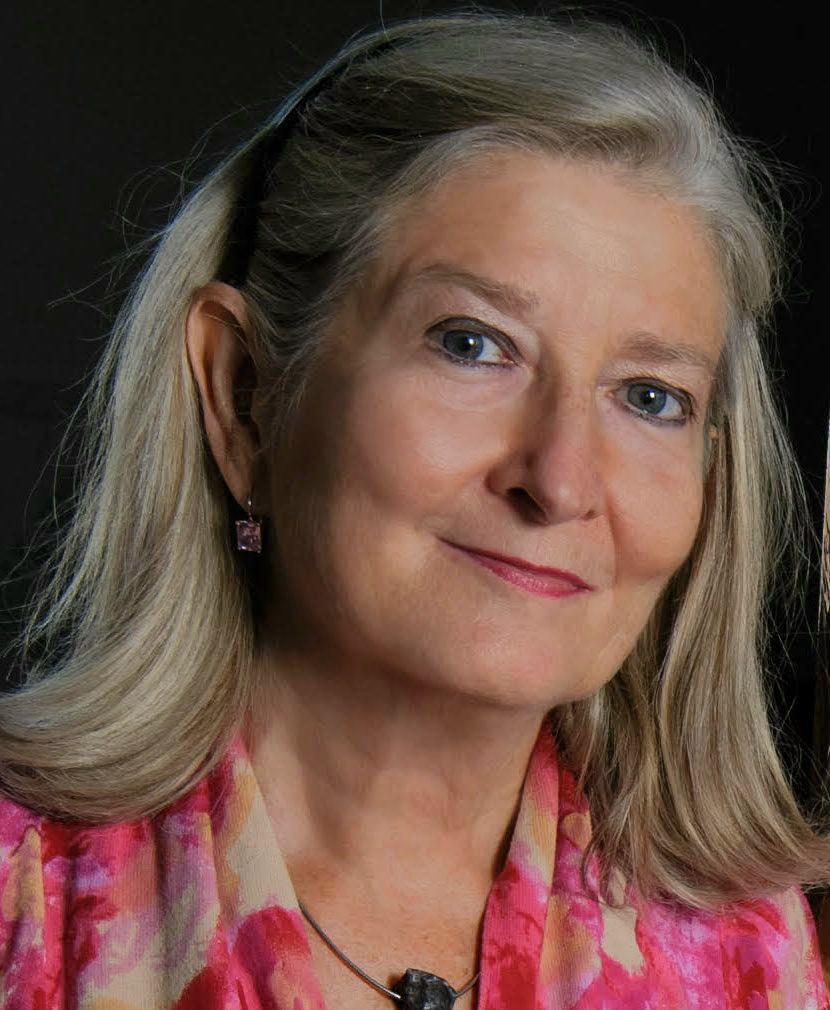
Patrizia Caraveo, astrophysicist, Bruno Rossi Prize (2007, 2011, 2012)

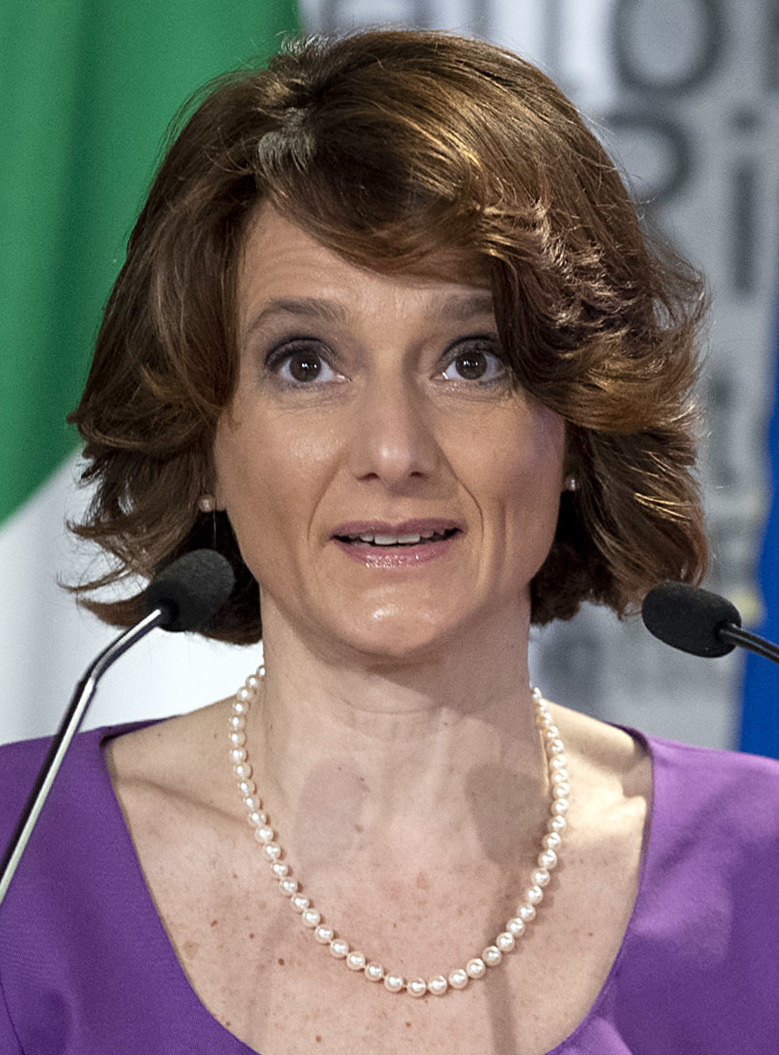
Elena Bonetti, mathematician and former minister

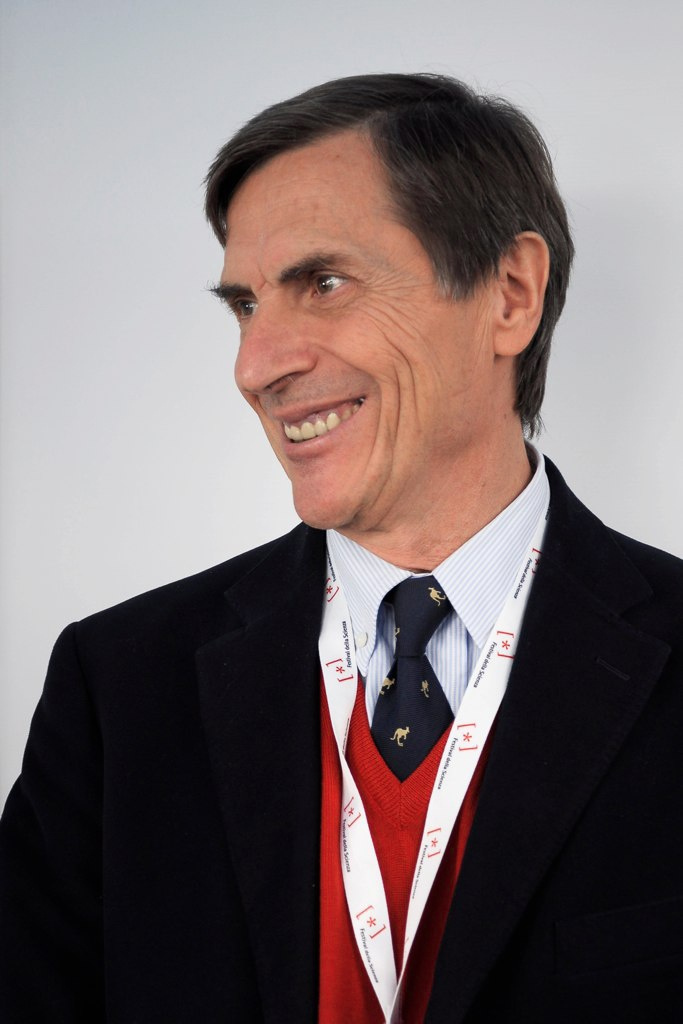
Alberto Mantovani, physician and immunologist, Robert Koch Prize (2016)

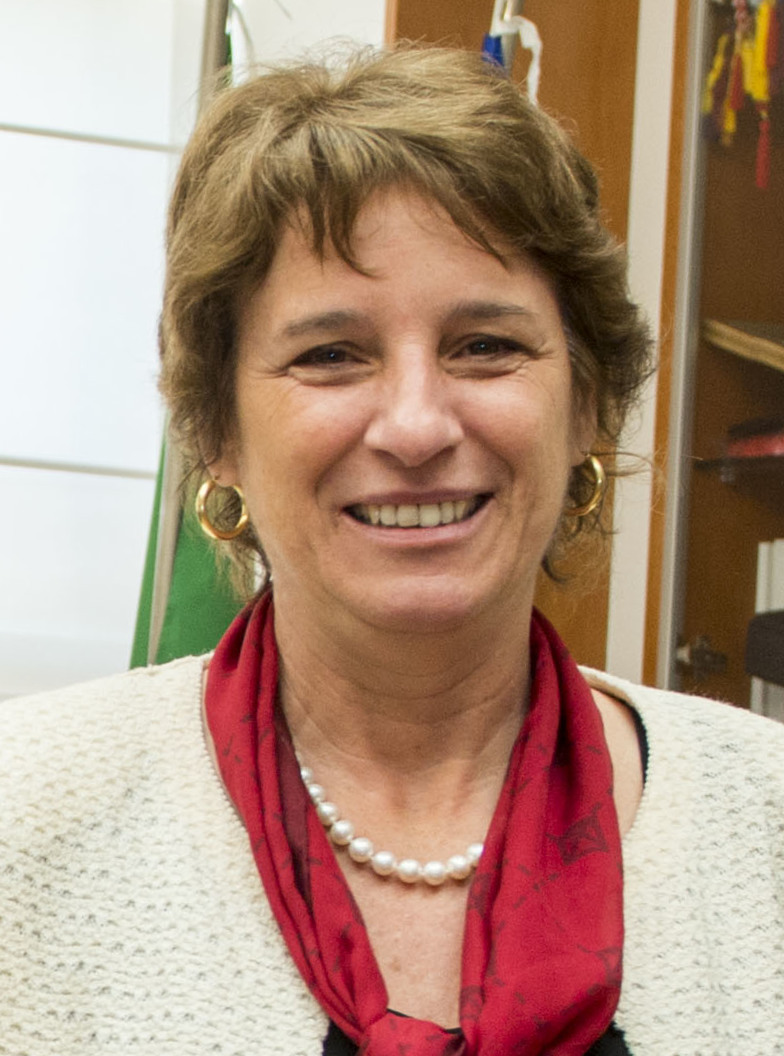
Maria Cristina Messa, physician and nuclear medicine specialist, former rector of UNIMIB, former minister

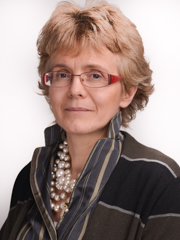
Elena Cattaneo, pharmacologist, co-founding director of the UNIMI Center for Stem Cell Research, senator for life

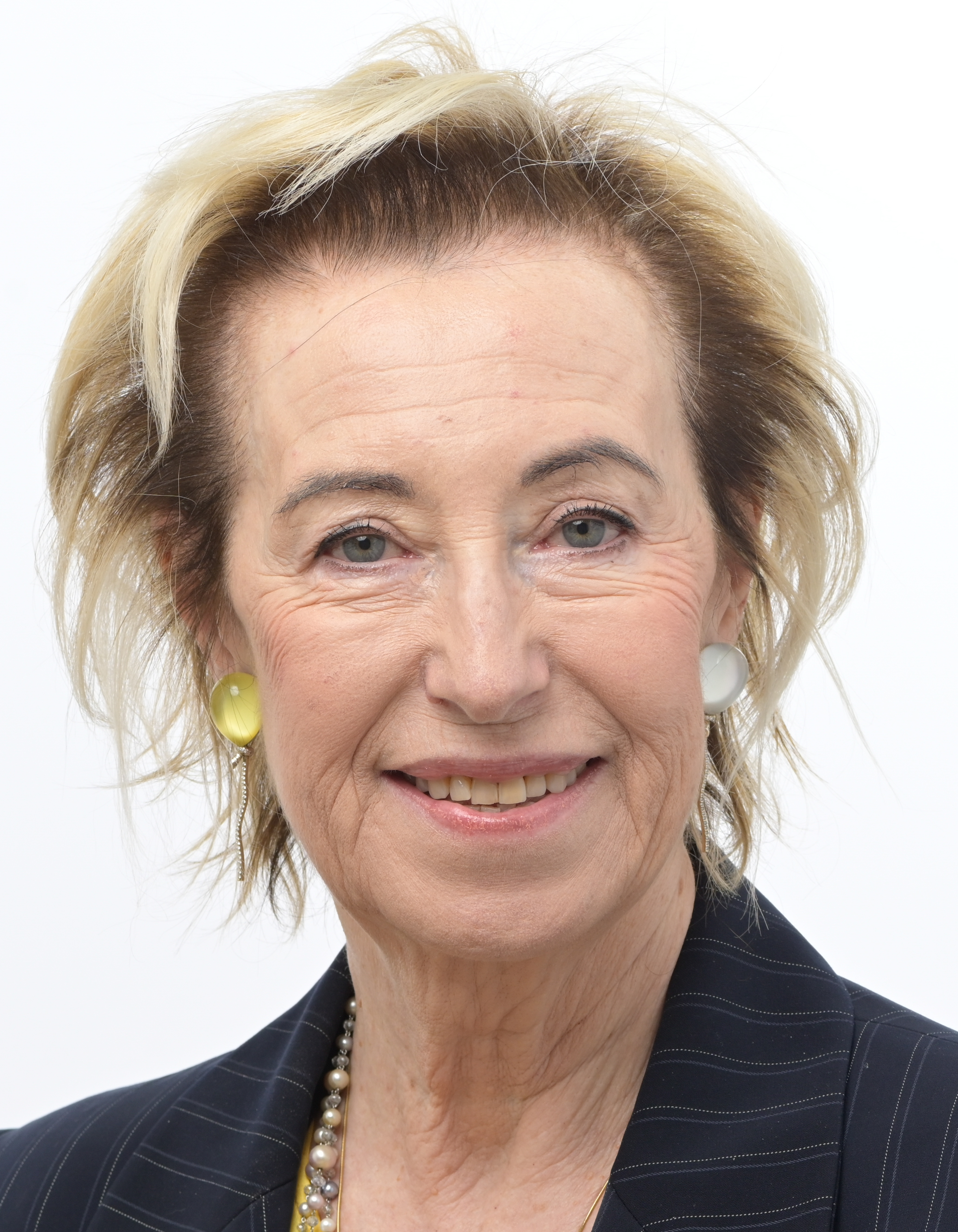
Letizia Moratti, former president of RAI, minister, mayor of Milan, president of UBI Banca, and MEP

=== In science ===
The notable alumni of the University of Milan in science include Riccardo Giacconi (Nobel laureate in Physics, 2002); Enrico Bombieri (Fields Medal recipient, 1974); Marco Bersanelli (Gruber Prize in Cosmology recipient, 2006); Patrizia Caraveo (Bruno Rossi Prize recipient, 2007, 2011, 2012); Alberto Mantovani, immunologist (Robert Koch Prize recipient, 2016); Fabiola Gianotti (two times CERN General Director and Bruno Pontecorvo Prize recipient, 2019); Giovanni Bignami, astrophysicist (Bruno Rossi Prize 1993); Elena Cattaneo, biologist (gold medal from the President of the Italian Republic, Senator for life); and Giuseppe Resnati, chemist (van der Waals Prize recipient, 2021).

=== In politics and government ===
Notable alumni of the University of Milan in politics and government include Silvio Berlusconi (Italian Prime Minister and President of the European Council); Bettino Craxi (Italian Prime Minister and President of the European Council); Karolos Papoulias (President of Greece and Greek Minister of Foreign Affairs); Letizia Moratti (Minister of Education, University and Research and Mayor of Milan); Elena Bonetti (Minister for Family and Equal Opportunities); Massimo Garavaglia (Minister of Tourism); Roberto Maroni (Minister of the Interior; Labour, Deputy Prime Minister); Maria Cristina Messa (Minister of University and Research, Rector of the University of Milan-Bicocca); Matteo Salvini (Deputy Prime Minister, Minister of the Interior); and Mihai Popșoi (Moldovan Minister of Foreign Affairs).

=== Entrepreneurs and managers ===
Notable alumni of the University of Milan in management and entrepreneurship include Bernardo Caprotti (Esselunga's founder and CEO); Massimo Antonio Doris (CEO of Mediolanum Bank); Carlo Ponti (film producer); Fedele Confalonieri (CEO of Mediaset); Claudio Descalzi (CEO of Eni); Giorgio Armani (founder and head designer of Armani); Miuccia Prada (co-CEO and head designer of Prada and the founder of its subsidiary Miu Miu); Letizia Moratti (president of RAI, president of the board of directors of UBI Banca); and Silvio Berlusconi (founder of Mediaset and Fininvest). Berlusconi's daughter Marina Berlusconi (chairwoman of Fininvest and Arnoldo Mondadori Editore) and son Pier Silvio Berlusconi (president of Reti Televisive Italiane) are among the alumni who studied at the university but didn't graduate.

=== Others ===
Other notable alumni of the University of Milan include Enrico Mentana (journalist, television presenter and publisher); Nino Rota (composer); Claudio Bisio (actor, presenter); Elisabetta Canalis (model); Antonella Clerici (presenter, host-TV); Sergio Romano (writer, journalist, and historian); Dario Edoardo Viganò (writer, priest); Paolo Andrea Di Pietro (actor, singer); Silvia Semenzin (activist, author, scholar); and Achille Bertarelli (art collector and art historian).

== Notable faculty ==
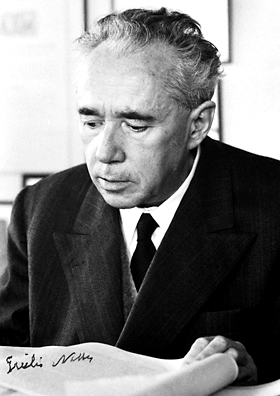
Giulio Natta, Nobel Laureate in Chemistry (1963) - Professor

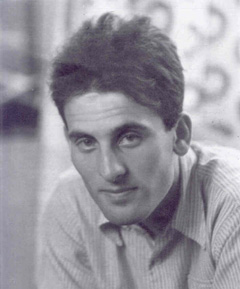
Giuseppe Occhialini, Wolf Prize in Physics (1979) - Professor

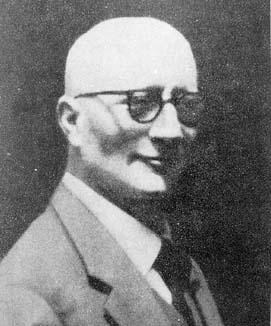
Giovanni Ricci, mathematician - Professor

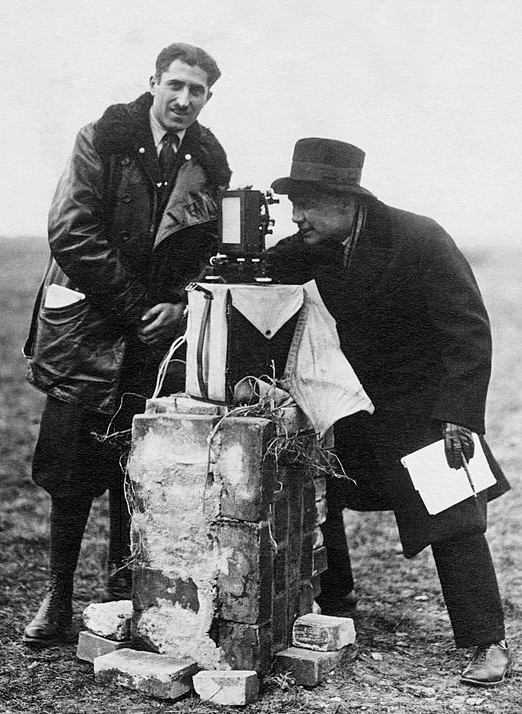
Aldo Pontremoli, Physicist and commander of the airship Italia.

Enrico Bompiani, pioneer in differential geometry and differential topology

== List of rectors ==
- Luigi Mangiagalli (October 1923 – 30 November 1926)
- Baldo Rossi (1 December 1926 – 30 November 1930)
- Ferdinando Livini (1 December 1930 – 31 October 1935)
- Alberto Pepere (1 November 1935 – July 1940)
- Uberto Pestalozza (September 1940 – 31 August 1943; as commissioner from October 1942 to August 1943)
- Aurelio Candian (September 1943)
- Giuseppe Menotti De Francesco (1 October 1943 – May 1945)
- Mario Rotondi (Note: Vice rector) (May – September 1945)
- Gian Piero Bognetti (September – October 1945)
- Felice Perussia (October 1945 – 31 October 1948)
- Giuseppe Menotti De Francesco (1 November 1948 – 31 October 1960)
- Caio Mario Cattabeni (1 November 1960 – 31 October 1966)
- Giovanni Polvani (1 November 1966 – 31 October 1969)
- Romolo Deotto (1 November 1969 – October 1972)
- Giuseppe Schiavinato (1972–1984)
- Paolo Mantegazza (1984–2001)
- Enrico Decleva (2001 – 8 November 2012)
- Gianluca Vago (9 November 2012 – 30 September 2018)
- Elio Franzini (1 October 2018 – 30 September 2024)
- Marina Brambilla (1 October 2024 – present)

== See also ==
- List of early modern universities in Europe
- List of universities in Italy
- Nicolò Cesa-Bianchi
- Giuseppe Scaraffia
- University of Milano-Bicocca
- Milan school of physics
- Ospedale Niguarda Ca' Granda
- International Medical School, University of Milan
- Polytechnic University of Milan
- Bocconi University
