= GRB 200522A =

Neutron star collision and explosion

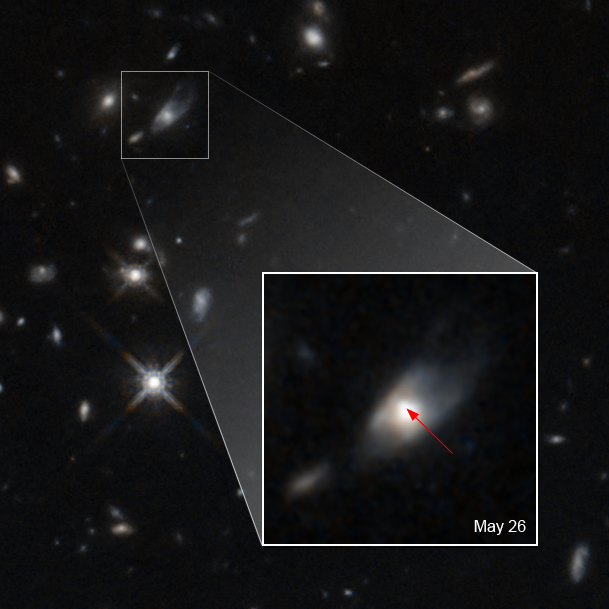
- GRB 200522A, as photographed in May of 2020
- Object type: Kilanova
- Other designations: GRB 200522A

Observation data (Epoch J2000)
- Constellation: Pisces
- Right ascension: 00:22:43.71
- Declination: -00:16:57.52
- Redshift: z= 0.554
- Distance: 5.4 billion ly
- In non-visible light (Radio, X-ray, etc.)
- Luminosity (specify): ≈(1.3-1.7) × 1042 erg s-1
- Related media on Wikimedia Commons

GRB 200522A is a large kilonova in the Constellation Pisces. It was first observed in May 2020 by the Hubble Space Telescope. It is the result of the largest neutron star explosion ever recorded, and was bright enough to be visible by Hubble 5.4 billion light years away.

== Formation ==
GRB 200522A is believed to have been formed when two neutron stars collided and exploded, creating an extremely large and bright short-ray gamma burst. The brightness of the emission was 10 times that of predicted, and was around 10,000 times more powerful than the sun in its entire 10 billion year lifetime. These findings and numbers, aided by the Hubble, have concluded that the kilonova is masking an extremely large and magnetized neutron star.

== Reactions ==
Prominent astronomer and professor Wen-fai Fong stated about the kilanova, "It's amazing to me that after 10 years of studying the same type of phenomenon, we can discover unprecedented behavior like this."

ADS stated "This is substantially lower than on-axis short GRB afterglow detections but is a factor of ≈8-17 more luminous than the kilonova of GW170817 and significantly more luminous than any kilonova candidate for which comparable observations exist."

== See also ==
- Gamma Ray
- 2020 in science
