= GW190425 =

Gravitational-wave event

- Event type: Gravitational wave
- Instrument: LIGO, Virgo interferometer
- Distance: 159+69 −71 Mpc
- Progenitor: Unknown

GW190425 was a gravitational wave detected on 25 April 2019 at LIGO-Livingston. Some low signal-to-noise data from the Virgo interferometer could not be used for detection but was used for parameter estimation. In contrast to GW170817, LIGO-Hanford was offline and did not observe GW190425, and because the Virgo detection was low-confidence, the event is not well-localized in the sky — the 90% confidence zone spans 8284 deg^{2} (roughly 20% of the sky), while GW170817 was localized to 28 deg^{2} (about 0.07% of the sky) before its optical counterpart was identified.

GW190425 was a compact binary coalescence with a signal to noise ratio 12.9. No electromagnetic event has been conclusively associated with GW190425; one candidate is FRB 20190425A in the galaxy UGC 10667. The signal could be result of a collision of two neutron stars, a neutron star and a low-mass black hole, or two low-mass black holes with a total mass of 3.4+0.3
−0.1 M_{☉} and a chirp mass of 1.44+0.02
−0.02 M_{☉}, much heavier than any binary neutron-star system known from radioastronomy observations. The unusual mass has led to several different hypothesis for the origin of the signal. Some examples include: a neutron star might paired with 4-5 M_{☉} Helium star might undergo common envelope evolution then supernova to produce an unusual binary neutron star, higher mass binary neutron stars may be preferentially created with either high or low magnetic fields explaining the lack of radioastronomy signals, and the possibility that the mass observation is at the extreme of a distribution characteristic of binary neutron stars.
