= GRB 150101B =

Short gamma-ray burst

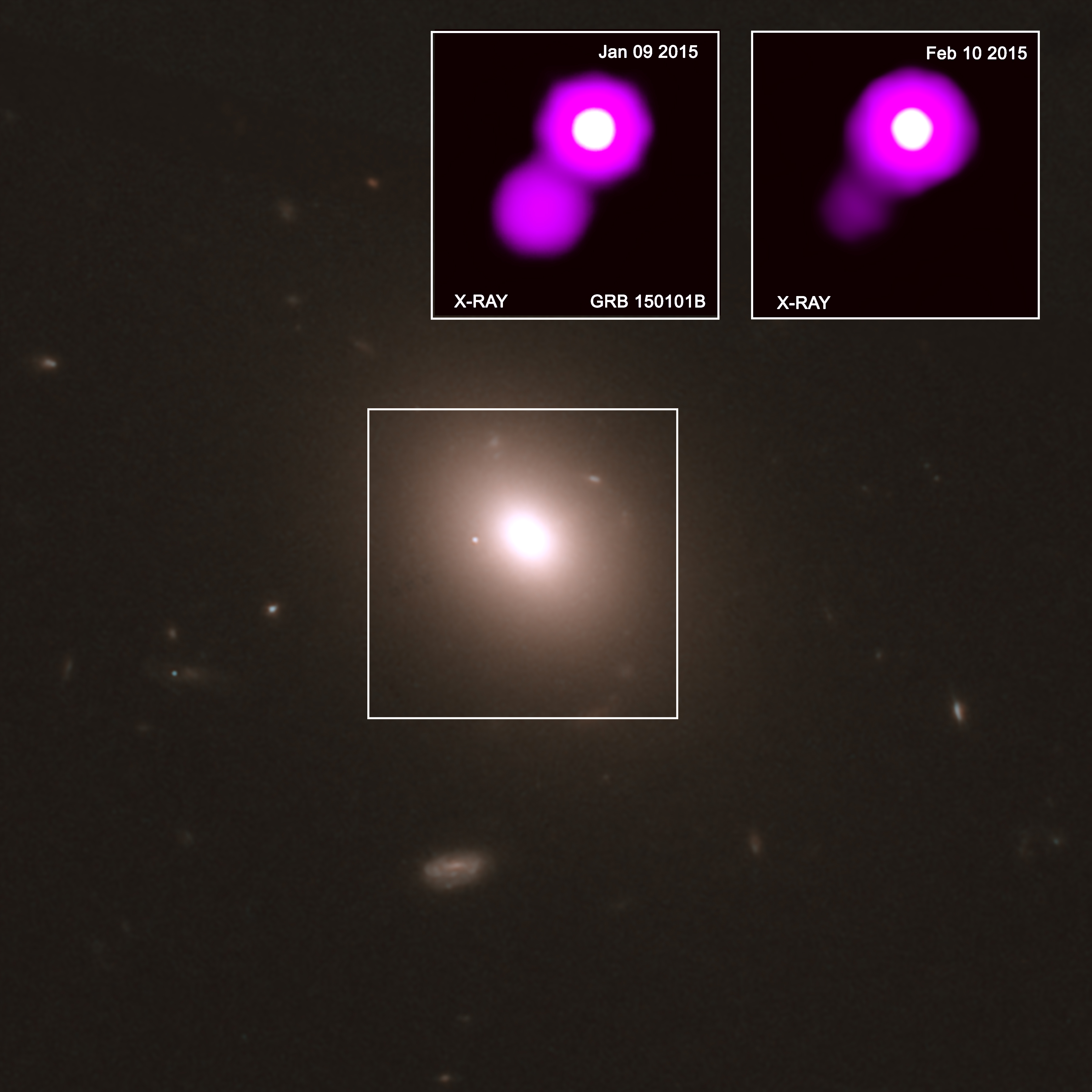
- Detection of GRB150101B
- ?? GRB, short-duration
- Date: 1 January 2015; 15:23 UT by the Burst Alert Telescope (BAT); 15:23:35 UT by the Gamma-ray Burst Monitor (GBM)
- Constellation: Virgo
- Right ascension: 12^{h} 32^{m} 04.96^{s}
- Declination: −10° 56′ 00.7″
- Epoch: J2000
- Galactic coordinates: 295.26103 +51.64971 [ 1800 1800 0 ]
- Distance: 1.7 billion light-years (0.52 Gpc) z=0.13437; 0.1341
- Redshift: ?? 0.093
- Total energy output: ~1.3 ×10^{49} ergs

GRB 150101B is a short gamma-ray burst (sGRB, or simply GRB) that was detected on 1 January 2015 at 15:23 UT by the Burst Alert Telescope (BAT) on board the Swift Observatory Satellite, and at 15:23:35 UT by the Gamma-ray Burst Monitor (GBM) on board the Fermi Gamma-ray Space Telescope. The GRB was determined to be 1.7 billion light-years (0.52 Gpc) from Earth near the host galaxy 2MASX J12320498-1056010 in the constellation Virgo. The characteristics of GRB 150101B are remarkably similar to those of historic event GW170817, known to be a merger of two neutron stars.

== Observations ==
In October 2018, astronomers reported that GRB 150101B, 1.7 billion light years away from Earth, may be analogous to the historic GW170817, a gravitational wave detected in 2017, which is about 130 million light years away, and associated with the merger of two neutron stars. The similarities between the two events, in terms of gamma ray, optical and x-ray emissions, as well as to the nature of the associated host galaxies, are considered "striking", and this remarkable resemblance suggests the two separate and independent events may both be the result of the merger of neutron stars, and both may be a hitherto-unknown class of kilonova transients. Kilonova events, therefore, may be more diverse and common in the universe than previously understood, according to the researchers.

According to one of the study researchers, Eleonora Troja, "It's a big step to go from one detected object to two. Our discovery tells us that events like GW170817 and GRB 150101B could represent a whole new class of erupting objects that turn on and off in X-rays and might actually be relatively common." Troja further stated, "We've been able [to] identify this kilonova without gravitational wave data, so maybe in the future, we'll even be able to do this without directly observing a gamma-ray burst." Another researcher, Geoffrey Ryan, said, "We have a case of cosmic look-alikes. They look the same, act the same and come from similar neighborhoods, so the simplest explanation is that they are from the same family of objects." According to co-author, Alexander Kutyrev, "If the next such observation reveals a merger between a neutron star and a black hole, that would be truly groundbreaking. Our latest observations give us renewed hope that we'll see such an event before too long." Another researcher, Hendrik Van Eerten, noted, "We need more cases like GW170817 that combine gravitational wave and electromagnetic data to find an example between a neutron star and black hole. Such a detection would be the first of its kind. Our results are encouraging for finding more mergers and making such a detection."

== See also ==
- GRB 080319B
- Neil Gehrels Swift Observatory
