= NGC 4993 =

Galaxy in the constellation of Hydra

- NGC 4993 and GRB 170817A afterglow as taken by Hubble Space Telescope

Observation data (J2000 epoch)
- Constellation: Hydra
- Right ascension: 13^{h} 09^{m} 47.7^{s}
- Declination: −23° 23′ 02″
- Redshift: 0.009727
- Heliocentric radial velocity: 2916 km/s
- Distance: 44.1 Mpc (144 Mly)
- Group or cluster: NGC 4993 Group
- Apparent magnitude (V): 13.32

Characteristics
- Type: (R')SAB0^-(rs)
- Size: ~55,000 ly (17 kpc) (estimated)
- Apparent size (V): 1.3 x 1.1
- Notable features: Host of neutron star merger detected as gravitational wave GW170817 and gamma-ray burst GRB 170817A

Other designations
- NGC 4994, ESO 508-18, AM 1307-230, MCG -4-31-39, PGC 45657, WH III 766

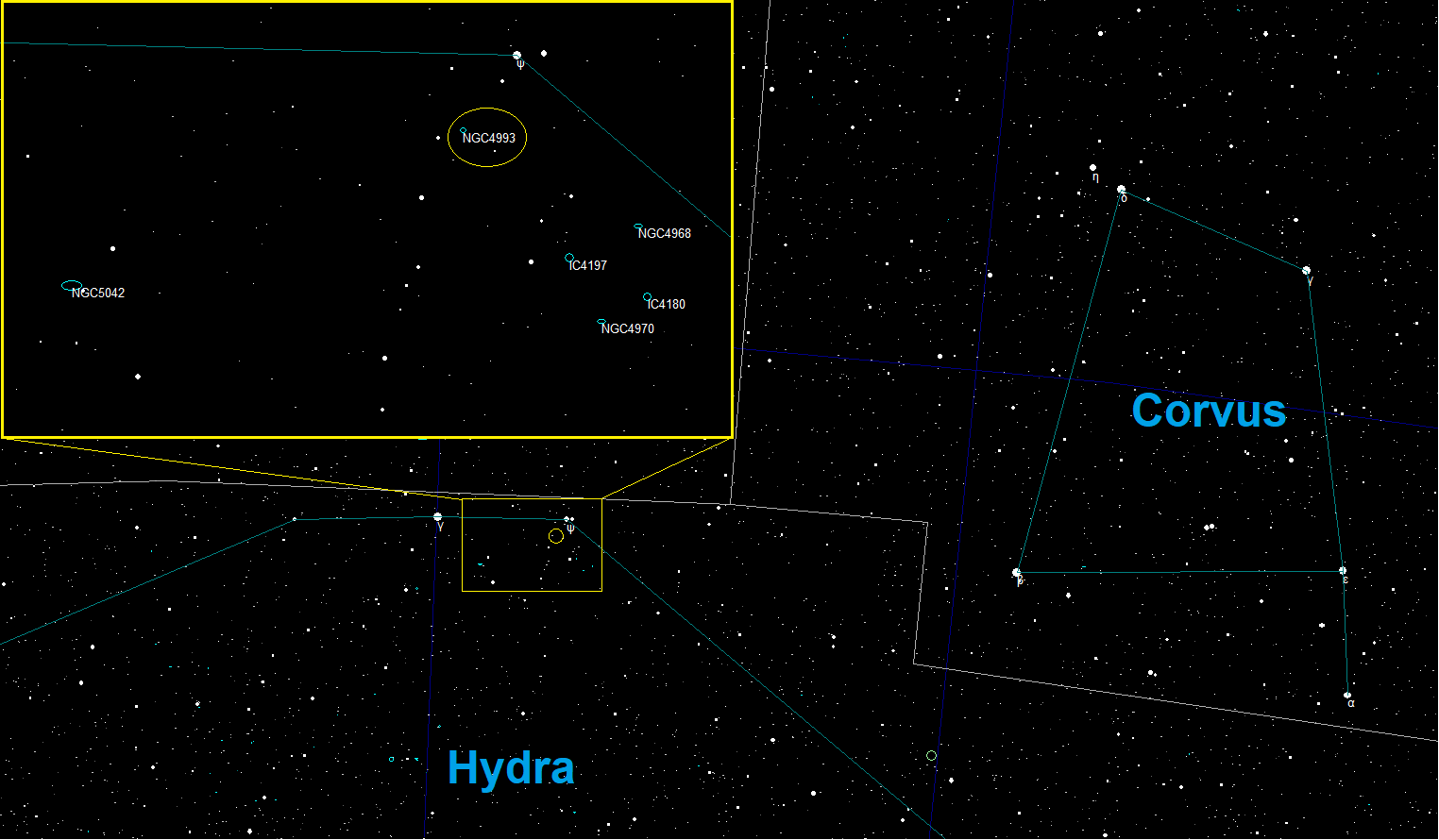
NGC 4993 starmap near ψ Hydrae, near galaxies of NGC 4968, NGC 4970, NGC 5042, IC 4180, IC 4197

NGC 4993 (also catalogued as NGC 4994 in the New General Catalogue) is a lenticular galaxy located about 140 million light-years away in the constellation Hydra. It was discovered on 26 March 1789 by William Herschel and is a member of the NGC 4993 Group.

NGC 4993 was the site of GW170817, a collision of two neutron stars, the first astronomical event detected in both electromagnetic and gravitational radiation, a discovery given the Breakthrough of the Year award for 2017 by the journal Science. The detection of gamma-ray burst GRB 170817A simultaneous with the gravitational wave event, for example, provided the first direct confirmation that binary neutron star collisions generate short gamma-ray bursts.

== Physical characteristics ==
NGC 4993 has several concentric shells of stars and a large dust lane—with a diameter of approximately a few kiloparsecs—which surrounds the nucleus and is stretched out into an "s" shape. The dust lane appears to be connected to a small dust ring with a diameter of ~330 ly (0.1 kpc). These features in NGC 4993 may be the result of a recent merger with a gaseous late-type galaxy that occurred about 400 million years ago. However, Palmese et al. suggest that the galaxy involved in the merger was a gas-poor galaxy.

=== Dark matter content ===
NGC 4993 has a dark matter halo with an estimated mass of 193.9×10^{10} M_{☉}.

=== Globular clusters ===
NGC 4993 has an estimated population of 250 globular clusters.

The luminosity of NGC 4993 indicates that the globular cluster system surrounding the galaxy may be dominated by metal-poor globular clusters.

== Supermassive black hole ==
NGC 4993 has a supermassive black hole with an estimated mass of roughly 80 to 100 million solar masses (8×10^{7} M_{☉}).

== Galactic nucleus activity ==
The presence of weak O III, NII and SII emission lines in the nucleus of NGC 4993 and the relatively high ratio of [NII]λ6583/Hα suggest that NGC 4993 is a low-luminosity AGN (LLAGN). The activity may have been triggered by gas from the late-type galaxy as it merged with NGC 4993.

== Neutron star merger observations ==
On 17 August 2017, rumors circulated that NASA's Fermi and ESA's INTEGRAL had detected GRB 170817A, a short gamma-ray burst (sGRB) of the type conjectured to be emitted in the collision of two neutron stars. On 16 October 2017, the LIGO and Virgo collaborations announced that, 1.7 seconds before the GRB signal, they had detected GW170817, a gravitational wave event which matched predictions for such mergers. The gravitational wave signal had a duration of about 100 seconds, and was indeed later confirmed as the first gravitational wave detection of a neutron star merger.

The simultaneous detection of the GW and sGRB signals suggested that they were emitted by the same astrophysical event, so researchers scrambled to combine their data and narrow down its location in the sky. An intense search effort ensued, with hundreds of astronomers across the world pre-empting telescope schedules to scan the region of the sky constrained by the GW / sGRB data. Eleven hours after the gravitational wave and gamma-ray signals, an optical transient, kilonova AT 2017gfo (initially designated SSS17a), was detected in NGC 4993, allowing the location of the merger to be precisely known. Together with GW170817, GRB 170817A and AT 2017gfo marked the first observation and localization of electromagnetic counterparts to a gravitational wave observation, an important milestone in the field of multi-messenger astronomy. For example, the initial GW and sGRB signals had traveled for 140 million years at the speed of light before arriving at earth only 1.7 seconds apart, empirically tightening the previous constraint on the speed of gravity by around 14 orders of magnitude.

== Gallery ==
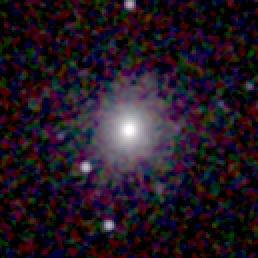
2MASS image of NGC 4993

== See also ==
- Gravitational-wave astronomy
- List of gamma-ray bursts
- List of gravitational wave observations
- Neil Gehrels Swift Observatory
- Ultra-Fast Flash Observatory Pathfinder
