= Eleonora Troja =

Italian astrophysicist

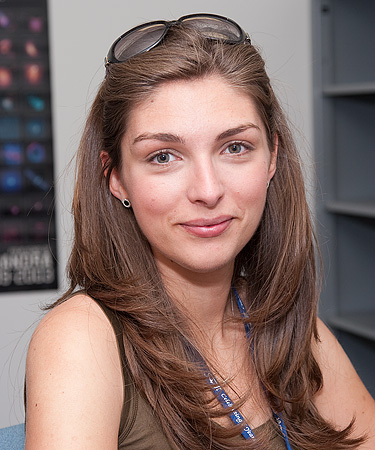
- Education: University of Palermo (BA, MPhil, PhD)
- Awards: NASA Silver Achievement Medal (2018); NASA Exceptional Scientific Achievement Medal (2021)
- Scientific career
- Fields: Astrophysics
- Workplaces: Goddard Space Flight Center; University of Maryland, College Park
- Thesis: Gamma-ray bursts in the Swift era: evidence of long lived central engines and implications for progenitor models (2009)
- Doctoral advisor: Giancarlo Cusumano
- Other academic advisors: Giovanni Peres; Fabio Reale; Neil Gehrels
- Website: eleonoratroja.wordpress.com

Eleonora Troja is an Italian astrophysicist. In 2017 she led the discovery of X-ray emission from the gravitational wave source GW170817.

== Education ==
Troja completed a B.A. in physics and astronomy at University of Palermo in 2002. She completed a thesis, X-ray spectroscopy of He-like ions in optically thin astrophysical plasmas, under supervisor Giovanni Peres. Troja earned a M.Phil. in physics and astronomy at Palermo in 2005 under Fabio Reale. Her graduate thesis was titled XMM-Newton observations of the supernova remnant IC 443: analysis of the thermal X-ray emission. She completed a Ph.D. in physics and astronomy in 2009 under advisor Giancarlo Cusumano. Her dissertation was titled Gamma-ray bursts in the Swift era: evidence of long lived central engines and implications for progenitor models. From July 2009 to July 2012, Troja was a postdoctoral fellow at Goddard Space Flight Center (GSFC) under advisor Neil Gehrels.

== Career ==
In July 2013, Troja became the Swift Guest Investigator Program Lead at NASA GSFC. In 2021 she joined the University of Rome Tor Vergata as Associate Professor.

=== Research ===
Troja researches high-energy astrophysics, gamma-ray bursts (GRB), and electromagnetic counterparts of gravitational waves. In her career Troja worked on a variety of different aspects of the GRB phenomenon, although her focus is the connection between short duration GRBs, neutron star mergers, and gravitational wave sources. In 2017 she led the discovery of X-ray emission from the gravitational wave source GW170817.

Troja's main interest is to investigate the observational signatures of compact binary mergers, that is, binary systems composed by either two neutron stars (NS-NS) or a neutron star and a black hole (NS-BH) which slowly spiral into each other and eventually collide due to energy losses to gravitational radiation. Compact binary mergers lie at the intersection of several key aspects of modern astrophysics:

- they are the most likely cause of short duration gamma-ray bursts;
- they are strong sources of gravitational wave radiation, and prime candidates for direct detection with advanced LIGO and Virgo;
- they are the most promising r-process sites for the formation of all the heavy elements (i.e. gold, platinum, uranium, …) found on Earth.

These three fundamental areas of investigation are at the core of Troja's research.

=== Awards and honors ===
Troja has won the following awards:

- NASA Exceptional Scientific Achievement Medal (2021)
- NASA Silver Achievement Medal (2018)
- Italian Bilateral Scientific Cooperation Award (2018) to recognize an Italian eminent scientist who, in performing his/her research abroad, has made a remarkable contribution to the advancement of science and technology, thus improving Italy’s S&T relations with foreign countries and with International Organizations.
