= Reduced mass =

Effective inertial mass

In physics, reduced mass is a measure of the effective inertial mass of a system with two or more particles when the particles are interacting with each other. Reduced mass allows the two-body problem to be solved as if it were a one-body problem. Note, however, that the mass determining the gravitational force is not reduced. In the computation, one mass can be replaced with the reduced mass, if this is compensated by replacing the other mass with the sum of both masses. The reduced mass is frequently denoted by $\mu$ (mu), although the standard gravitational parameter is also denoted by $\mu$ (as are a number of other physical quantities). It has the dimensions of mass, and SI unit kg.

Reduced mass is particularly useful in classical mechanics.

== Equation ==
Given two bodies, one with mass m_{1} and the other with mass m_{2}, the equivalent one-body problem, with the position of one body with respect to the other as the unknown, is that of a single body of mass
$$\mu = m_1 \parallel m_2 = \cfrac{1}{\cfrac{1}{m_1} + \cfrac{1}{m_2}} = \cfrac{m_1 m_2}{m_1 + m_2},$$
where the force on this mass is given by the force between the two bodies.

=== Properties ===
The reduced mass is always less than or equal to the mass of each body:
$$\mu \leq m_1, \quad \mu \leq m_2$$
and has the reciprocal additive property:
$$\frac{1}{\mu} = \frac{1}{m_1} + \frac{1}{m_2}$$
which by re-arrangement is equivalent to half of the harmonic mean.

In the special case that $m_1 = m_2$:
$$\mu = \frac{m_1}{2} = \frac{m_2}{2}$$

If $m_1 \gg m_2$, then $\mu \approx m_2$.

== Derivation ==
The equation can be derived as follows.

=== Newtonian mechanics ===
Using Newton's second law, the force exerted by a body (particle 2) on another body (particle 1) is:
$$\mathbf{F}_{12} = m_1 \mathbf{a}_1$$

The force exerted by particle 1 on particle 2 is:
$$\mathbf{F}_{21} = m_2 \mathbf{a}_2$$

According to Newton's third law, the force that particle 2 exerts on particle 1 is equal and opposite to the force that particle 1 exerts on particle 2:
$$\mathbf{F}_{12} = - \mathbf{F}_{21}$$

Therefore:
$$m_1 \mathbf{a}_1 = - m_2 \mathbf{a}_2 \;\; \Rightarrow \;\; \mathbf{a}_2=-{m_1 \over m_2} \mathbf{a}_1$$

The relative acceleration a_{rel} between the two bodies is given by:
$$\mathbf{a}_\text{rel} := \mathbf{a}_1-\mathbf{a}_2 = \left(1+\frac{m_1}{m_2}\right) \mathbf{a}_1 = \frac{m_2+m_1}{m_2}\mathbf{a}_1 = \frac{\mathbf{F}_{12}}{\mu} = \frac{m_1\mathbf{a}_1}{\mu}$$

Note that (since the derivative is a linear operator) the relative acceleration $\mathbf{a}_\text{rel}$ is equal to the acceleration of the separation $\mathbf{x}_\text{rel}$ between the two particles.
$$\mathbf{a}_\text{rel} = \mathbf{a}_1-\mathbf{a}_2 = \frac{d^2\mathbf{x}_1}{dt^2} - \frac{d^2\mathbf{x}_2}{dt^2} = \frac{d^2}{dt^2}\left(\mathbf{x}_1 - \mathbf{x}_2\right) = \frac{d^2\mathbf{x}_\text{rel}}{dt^2}$$

This simplifies the description of the system to one force (since $\mathbf{F}_{12} = - \mathbf{F}_{21}$), one coordinate $\mathbf{x}_\text{rel}$, and one mass $\mu$. Thus we have reduced our problem to a single degree of freedom, and we can conclude that particle 1 moves with respect to the position of particle 2 as a single particle of mass equal to the reduced mass, $\mu$.

=== Lagrangian mechanics ===
Alternatively, a Lagrangian description of the two-body problem gives a Lagrangian of
$$\mathcal{L} = {1 \over 2} m_1 \mathbf{\dot{r}}_1^2 + {1 \over 2} m_2 \mathbf{\dot{r}}_2^2 - V(| \mathbf{r}_1 - \mathbf{r}_2 | )$$
where ${\mathbf{r}}_{i}$ is the position vector of mass $m_{i}$ (of particle $i$). The potential energy V is a function as it is only dependent on the absolute distance between the particles. If we define
$$\mathbf{r} = \mathbf{r}_1 - \mathbf{r}_2$$
and let the centre of mass coincide with our origin in this reference frame, i.e.
$$m_1 \mathbf{r}_1 + m_2 \mathbf{r}_2 = 0,$$
then
$$\mathbf{r}_1 = \frac{m_2 \mathbf{r}}{m_1 + m_2} , \; \mathbf{r}_2 = -\frac{m_1 \mathbf{r}}{m_1 + m_2}.$$

Then substituting above gives a new Lagrangian
$$\mathcal{L} = \frac{1}{2} \mu \mathbf{\dot{r}}^2 - V(r),$$
where
$$\mu = \frac{m_1 m_2}{m_1 + m_2}$$
is the reduced mass. Thus we have reduced the two-body problem to that of one body.

== Applications ==
Reduced mass can be used in a multitude of two-body problems, where classical mechanics is applicable.

=== Moment of inertia of two point masses in a line ===
Two point masses rotating around the center of mass.

In a system with two point masses $m_1$ and $m_2$ such that they are co-linear, the two distances $r_1$ and $r_2$ to the rotation axis may be found with
$$r_1 = R \frac{m_2}{m_1+m_2}$$
$$r_2 = R \frac{m_1}{m_1+m_2}$$
where $R$ is the sum of both distances $R = r_1 + r_2$.

This holds for a rotation around the center of mass. The moment of inertia around this axis can be then simplified to
$$I = m_1 r_1^2 + m_2 r_2^2 = R^2 \frac{m_1 m_2^2}{(m_1+m_2)^2} + R^2 \frac{m_1^2 m_2}{(m_1+m_2)^2} = \mu R^2.$$

=== Collisions of particles ===
In a collision with a coefficient of restitution e, the change in kinetic energy can be written as
$$\Delta K = \frac{1}{2}\mu v^2_\text{rel} \left(e^2 - 1\right),$$
where v_{rel} is the relative velocity of the bodies before collision.

For typical applications in nuclear physics, where one particle's mass is much larger than the other the reduced mass can be approximated as the smaller mass of the system. The limit of the reduced mass formula as one mass goes to infinity is the smaller mass, thus this approximation is used to ease calculations, especially when the larger particle's exact mass is not known.

=== Motion of two massive bodies under their gravitational attraction ===
In the case of the gravitational potential energy
$$V(| \mathbf{r}_1 - \mathbf{r}_2 | ) = - \frac{G m_1 m_2}{| \mathbf{r}_1 - \mathbf{r}_2 |} \, ,$$
we find that the position of the first body with respect to the second is governed by the same differential equation as the position of a body with the reduced mass orbiting a body with a mass equal to the sum of the two masses, because
$$m_1 m_2 = \left(m_1+m_2\right) \mu.$$

=== Non-relativistic quantum mechanics ===
Consider the electron (mass m_{e}) and proton (mass m_{p}) in the hydrogen atom. They orbit each other about a common centre of mass, a two body problem. To analyze the motion of the electron, a one-body problem, the reduced mass replaces the electron mass
$$m_\text{e} \rightarrow \frac{m_\text{e} m_\text{p}}{m_\text{e} + m_\text{p}}$$

This idea is used to set up the Schrödinger equation for the hydrogen atom.

== See also ==
- Parallel (operator) - the general operation, of which reduced mass is just one case
- Center-of-momentum frame
- Momentum conservation
- Harmonic oscillator
- Chirp mass, a relativistic equivalent used in the post-Newtonian expansion
