= Multi-messenger astronomy =

Coordination of related astronomical observations

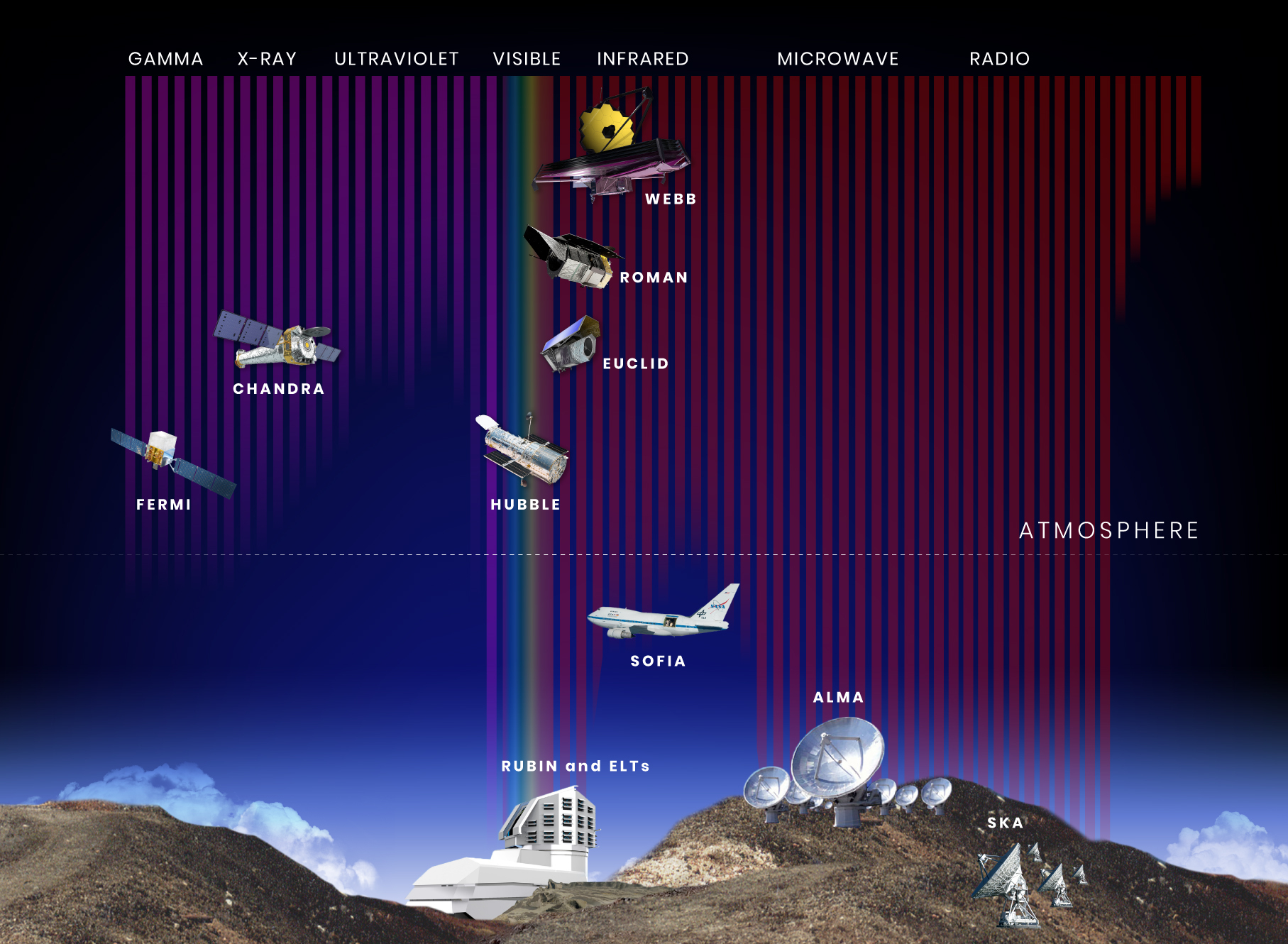
No single observatory can observe at all wavelengths of the electromagnetic spectrum, but astronomers can rely on data from both terrestrial and space-borne telescopes.

Multi-messenger astronomy is the coordinated observation and interpretation of multiple signals received from the same astronomical event. Many types of cosmological events involve complex interactions between a variety of astrophysical processes, each of which may independently emit signals of a characteristic "messenger" type: electromagnetic radiation (including infrared, visible light and X-rays), gravitational waves, neutrinos, and cosmic rays. When received on Earth, identifying that disparate observations were generated by the same source can allow for improved reconstruction or better understanding of the event, and reveals more information about the source.

The main multi-messenger sources outside the heliosphere are: compact binary pairs (black holes and neutron stars), supernovae, irregular neutron stars, gamma-ray bursts, active galactic nuclei, and relativistic jets. The table below lists several types of events and expected messengers.

Detection from one messenger and non-detection from a different messenger can also be informative. Lack of any electromagnetic counterpart, for example, could be evidence in support of the remnant being a black hole.

Event type	Electromagnetic	Cosmic rays	Gravitational waves	Neutrinos	Example
Solar flare	yes	yes	-	-	SOL1942-02-28
Supernova	yes	-	predicted	yes	SN 1987A
Neutron star merger	yes	-	yes	predicted	GW170817
Blazar	yes	possible	-	yes	TXS 0506+056 (IceCube)
Active galactic nucleus	yes	possible		yes	Messier 77 (IceCube)
Tidal disruption event	yes	possible	possible	yes	AT2019dsg (IceCube) AT2019fdr (IceCube)

== Networks ==
The Supernova Early Warning System (SNEWS), established in 1999 at Brookhaven National Laboratory and automated since 2005, combines multiple neutrino detectors to generate supernova alerts. (See also neutrino astronomy).

The Astrophysical Multimessenger Observatory Network (AMON), created in 2013, is a broader and more ambitious project to facilitate the sharing of preliminary observations and to encourage the search for "sub-threshold" events which are not perceptible to any single instrument. It is based at Pennsylvania State University.

Data science magnate Eric Schmidt has proposed an eponymous observatory system optimized for multi-messenger astronomy that includes a Northern Hemisphere counterpart to the Vera C. Rubin Observatory, an array of small radio dishes similar to the Square Kilometre Array, a similarly designed array of optical telescopes linked by fiber to a spectrograph, and a Hubble-sized visible-light space telescope; these designs would incorporate advanced, off-the-shelf and modular technologies.

== Milestones ==
- 1940s: Some cosmic rays are identified as forming in solar flares.
- 1987: Supernova SN 1987A emitted neutrinos that were detected at the Kamiokande-II, IMB and Baksan neutrino observatories, a couple of hours before the supernova light was detected with optical telescopes.
- August 2017: A neutron star collision in the galaxy NGC 4993 produced the gravitational wave signal GW170817, which was observed by the LIGO/Virgo collaboration. After 1.7 seconds, it was observed as the gamma ray burst GRB 170817A by the Fermi Gamma-ray Space Telescope and INTEGRAL, and its optical counterpart SSS17a was detected 11 hours later at the Las Campanas Observatory, then by the Hubble Space Telescope and the Dark Energy Camera. Ultraviolet observations by the Neil Gehrels Swift Observatory, X-ray observations by the Chandra X-ray Observatory and radio observations by the Karl G. Jansky Very Large Array complemented the detection. This was the first gravitational wave event observed with an electromagnetic counterpart, thereby marking a significant breakthrough for multi-messenger astronomy. Non-observation of neutrinos was attributed to the jets being strongly off-axis. In October 2020, astronomers reported lingering X-ray emission from GW170817/GRB 170817A/SSS17a.
- September 2017 (announced July 2018): On September 22, the extremely-high-energy (about 290 TeV) neutrino event IceCube-170922A was recorded by the IceCube Collaboration, which sent out an alert with coordinates for the possible source. The detection of gamma rays above 100 MeV by the Fermi-LAT Collaboration and between 100 GeV and 400 GeV by the MAGIC Collaboration from the blazar TXS 0506+056 (reported September 28 and October 4, respectively) was deemed positionally consistent with the neutrino signal. The signals can be explained by ultra-high-energy protons accelerated in blazar jets, producing neutral pions (decaying into gamma rays) and charged pions (decaying into neutrinos). This is the first time that a neutrino detector has been used to locate an object in space and a source of cosmic rays has been identified.
- October 2019 (announced February 2021): On October 1, a high energy neutrino was detected at IceCube and follow-up measurements in visible light, ultraviolet, x-rays and radio waves identified the tidal disruption event AT2019dsg as possible source.
- November 2019 (announced June 2022): A second high energy neutrino detected by IceCube associated with a tidal disruption event AT2019fdr.
- June 2023: Astronomers led by Naoko Kurahashi Neilson used a new cascade neutrino technique to detect, for the first time, the release of neutrinos from the galactic plane of the Milky Way galaxy, creating the first neutrino-based galactic map.
