= Kilonova =

Aftermath of a neutron star merger

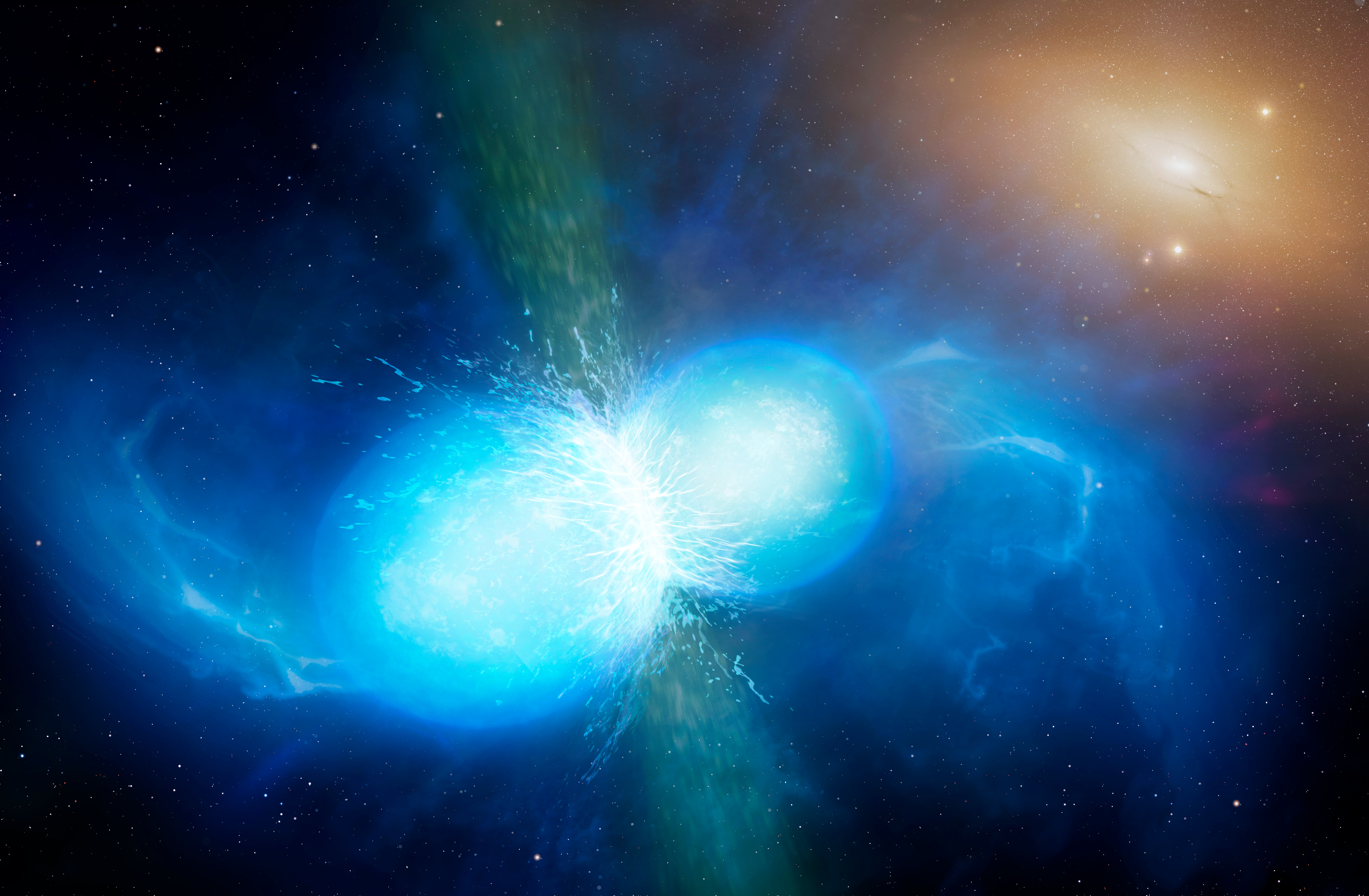
Artist's impression of neutron stars merging, producing gravitational waves and resulting in a kilonova

A kilonova (also called a macronova) is a transient astronomical event that occurs in a compact binary system when two neutron stars (BNS) or a neutron star and a black hole collide. The kilonova, visible over the weeks and months following the merger, is an isotropically expanding luminous afterglow of electromagnetic radiation emitted by the radioactive decay of r-process nuclei synthesized by—and then ejected from—the initial cataclysmic event.

The high sphericity of kilonovae through its early epochs was deduced from the blackbody nature of the spectrum observed for GW170817 / AT2017gfo, the only BNS merger that has been definitively localized as of June 2026.

== History ==
Animation showing two small, very dense neutron stars merge via gravitational wave radiation and explode as a kilonova

The existence of thermal transient events from neutron star mergers was first introduced by Li & Paczyński in 1998. The radioactive glow arising from the merger ejecta was originally called a mini-supernova, as it is 1/10 to 1/100 the brightness of a typical supernova, the self-detonation of a massive star. The term kilonova was later introduced by Metzger et al. in 2010 to characterize the peak brightness, which they showed reaches around 1000 times that of a classical nova.

The first candidate kilonova to be found was detected on June 3, 2013, as short gamma-ray burst GRB 130603B by instruments on board the Swift Gamma-Ray Burst Explorer and KONUS/WIND spacecraft, and then imaged by the Hubble Space Telescope 9 and 30 days later.

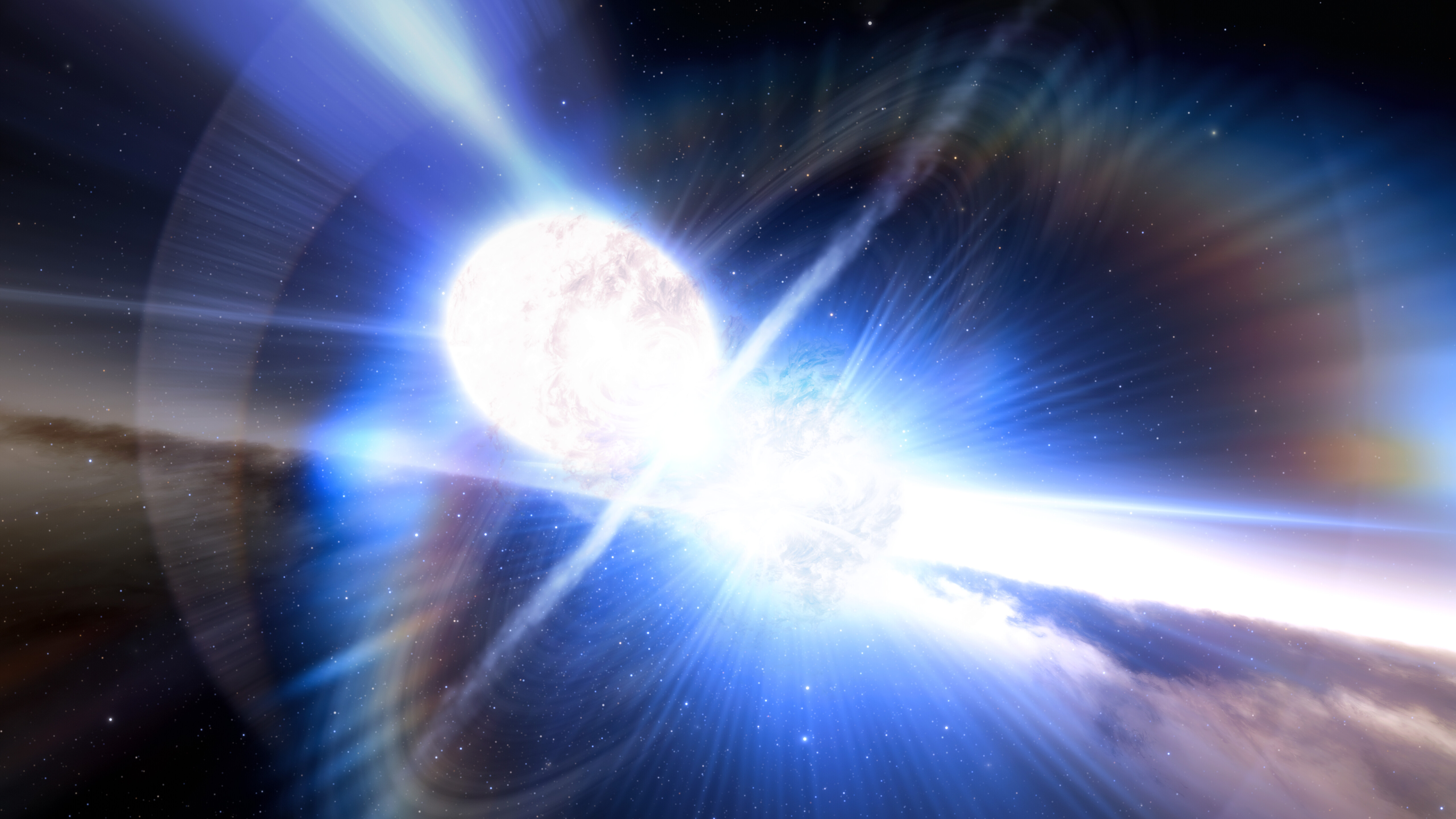
This artist's impression shows a kilonova produced by two colliding neutron stars.

On October 16, 2017, the LIGO and Virgo collaborations announced the detection of GW170817, the first gravitational wave (GW) shown to have originated from the binary merger of neutron stars. From its kilonova, it would also become the first GW to be definitively pinpointed by its corresponding electromagnetic observation. The GW detection co-occurred with a short GRB (GRB 170817A), and then after several hours, a longer lasting astronomical transient (AT 2017gfo), visible for weeks in the optical and near-infrared electromagnetic spectrum.

The kilonova observations allowed the event to be precisely located at just 140 million light-years away in the nearby galaxy NGC 4993. Observations of AT 2017gfo confirmed that it was the first conclusive observation of a kilonova. Spectral modelling of AT2017gfo identified the r-process elements strontium and yttrium, which conclusively ties the formation of heavy elements to neutron-star mergers. Further modelling showed the ejected fireball of heavy elements was highly spherical in early epochs.

Researchers have also suggested that a future catalog of kilonova detections could be used as a standard candle for measuring cosmic expansion, thus potentially resolving the Hubble tension: "Since kilonovae explosions are spherical, astronomers could compare the apparent size of a supernova explosion with its actual size as seen by the gas motion, and thus measure the rate of cosmic expansion at different distances."

== Theory ==
The inspiral and merging of two compact objects are a strong source of gravitational waves (GW). The basic model for thermal transients from neutron star mergers was introduced by Li-Xin Li and Bohdan Paczyński in 1998. In their work, they suggested that the radioactive ejecta from a neutron star merger is a source for powering thermal transient emission, later dubbed kilonova.

== Observations ==
A first observational suggestion of a kilonova came in 2008 following the gamma-ray burst GRB 080503, where a faint object appeared in optical light after one day and rapidly faded. However, other factors such as the lack of a galaxy and the detection of X-rays were not in agreement with the hypothesis of a kilonova. Another kilonova was suggested in 2013, in association with the short gamma-ray burst GRB 130603B, where the faint infrared emission from the distant kilonova was detected using the Hubble Space Telescope.

In October 2017, astronomers reported that AT 2017gfo was the first definitive case of a kilonova following the terminal merger of a binary neutron star system.

In October 2018, astronomers reported that GRB 150101B, a gamma-ray burst event detected in 2015, may be analogous to the historic GW170817. The similarities between the two events, in terms of gamma ray, optical and x-ray emissions, as well as to the nature of the associated host galaxies, are considered "striking", and this remarkable resemblance suggests the two separate and independent events may both be the result of the merger of neutron stars, and both may be a hitherto-unknown class of kilonova transients. Kilonova events, therefore, may be more diverse and common in the universe than previously understood, according to the researchers. Similarly, in 2019, GRB 160821B, a short gamma-ray burst detected in August 2016, was also re-examined and retrospectively deemed—by the resemblance of its kilonova to AT2017gfo—to be the result of a neutron star merger.

A kilonova was also thought to have caused the long gamma-ray burst GRB 211211A, discovered in December 2021 by Swift's Burst Alert Telescope (BAT) and the Fermi Gamma-ray Burst Monitor (GBM). These discoveries challenge the formerly prevailing theory that long GRBs exclusively come from supernovae, the end-of-life explosions of massive stars. GRB 211211A lasted 51s; GRB 191019A (2019) and GRB 230307A (2023), with durations of around 64s and 35s respectively, have been also argued to belong to this emerging class of neutron star merger as long GRB progenitor.

In 2023, GRB 230307A was observed and associated with tellurium and lanthanides.

In 2025, AT 2025ulz is a kilonova candidate that was found to be involved in a hypothetical transient event named as "SuperKilonova" was detected, a transient event that combines the characteristics of a core-collapse supernova and a kilonova.

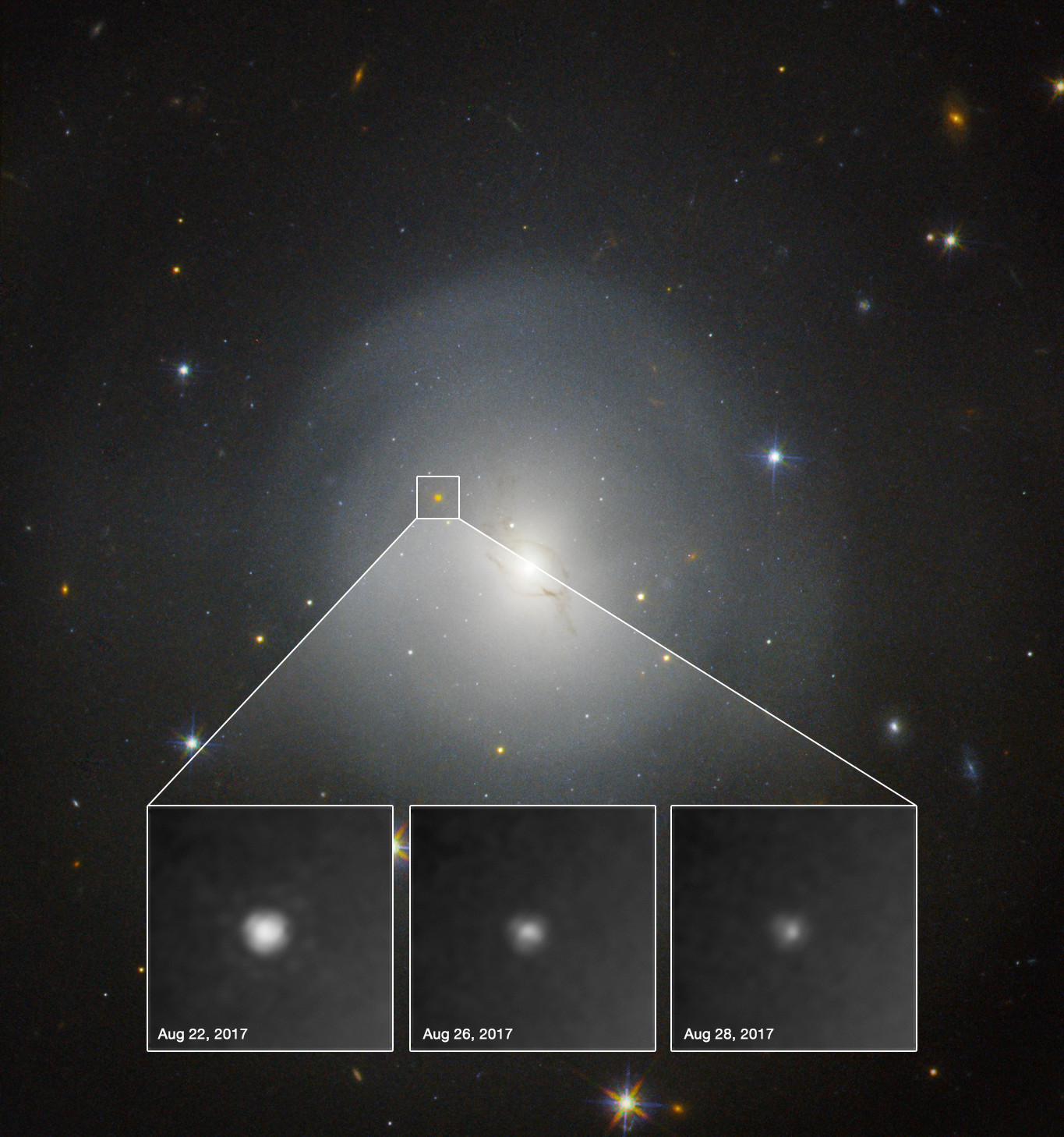
First kilonova observations by the Hubble Space Telescope

Fading kilonova in GRB160821B seen by the Hubble Space Telescope.

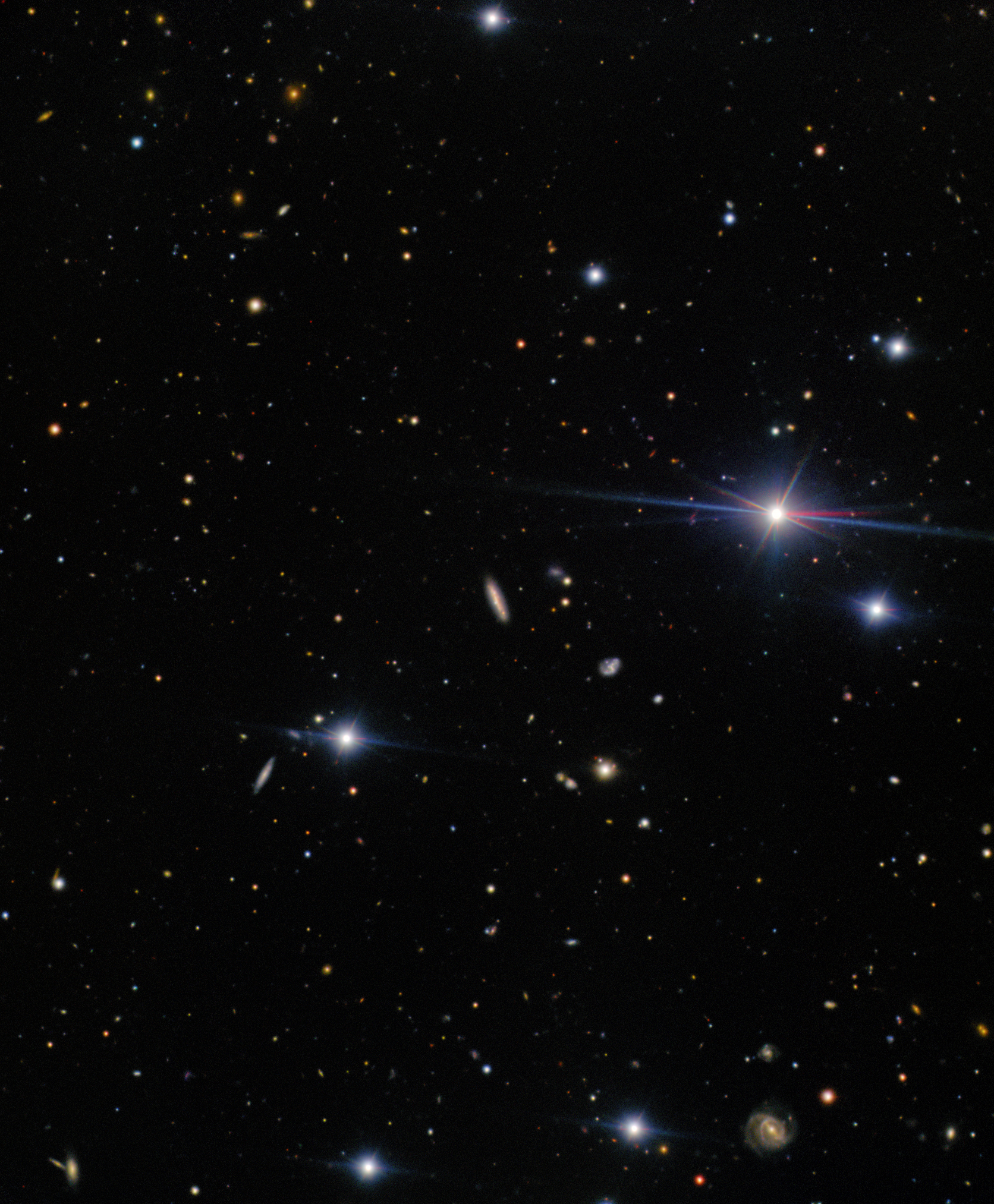
AT2025ulz host galaxy viewed from the Gemini North Telescope

== See also ==
- Hypernova
- Nova
- R-process
- Supernova
- Supernova impostor
