= GRB 230307A =

Gamma ray burst from a neutron star merger outside their galaxy

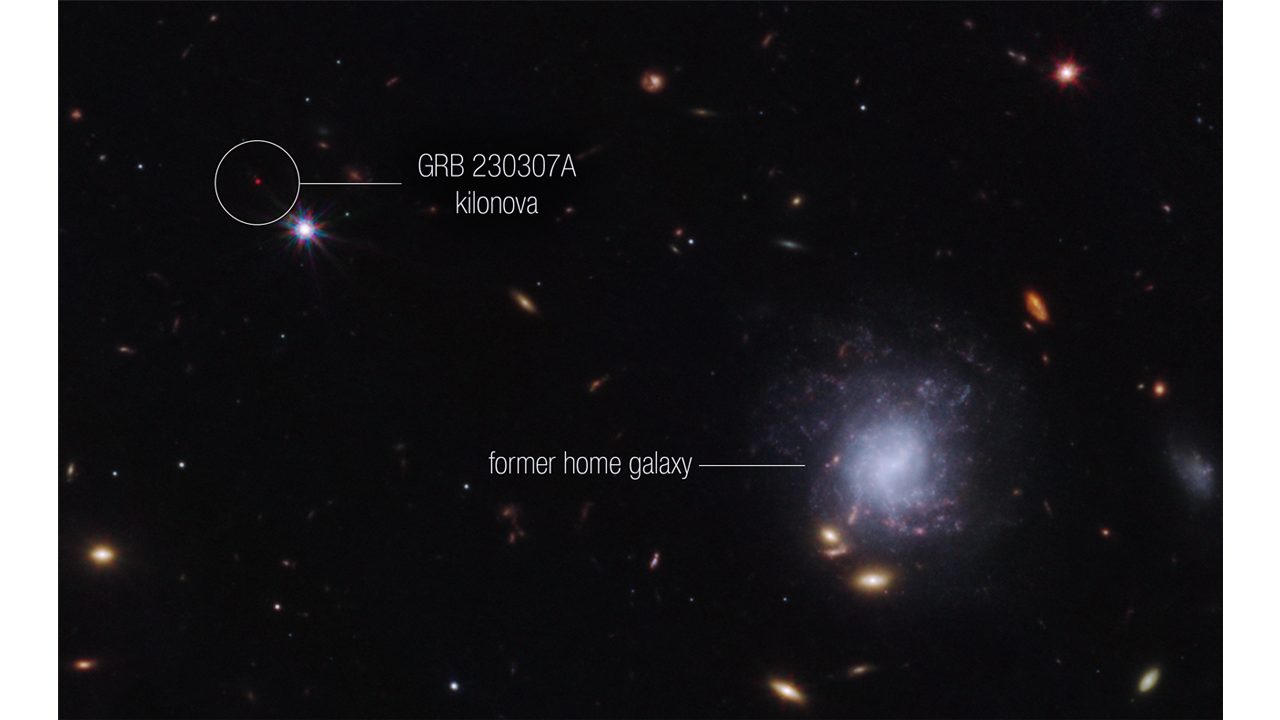
- An image of GRB 230307A with the red dot on the upper left corner being the gamma ray burst's near-infrared afterglow and the galaxy on the lower right corner being its former home galaxy
- Event type: Gamma ray burst
- Constellation: Mensa
- Right ascension: 04^{h} 03^{m} 26.24^{s}
- Declination: −75° 22′ 43.82″
- Distance: 900 million light years (comoving)
- Redshift: 0.065
- Total energy output: 10-1000 KeV
- Related media on Commons

GRB 230307A was an extremely bright, long duration gamma-ray burst (GRB), likely produced as a consequence of a neutron star merger or black hole - neutron star merger event. It lasted around three minutes, and was observed to have a gamma ray fluence of 3×10^{−4} erg cm^{−2} in the 10 to 1000 KeV (electronvolt) range making it second only to GRB 221009A, which was an extremely bright and long duration gamma ray burst deemed to be the Brightest Of All Time. The burst was around 1000 times more powerful than a typical gamma-ray burst. The burst had the second-highest gamma-ray fluence ever recorded. The James Webb Space Telescope (JWST) detected the chemical signature for tellurium (Te). The neutron stars were once part of a spiral galaxy (host galaxy) but were kicked out via gravitational interactions. Then while outside of the main galaxy at a distance of 120,000 light years, they merged, creating GRB 230307A.

230307A is the second brightest gamma ray burst detected in more than 50 years of observations and is located behind the Magellanic Bridge. Despite its long duration, it is most likely the result of the compact merger of a binary ejected from a galaxy in the local universe (redshift z=0.065).

== Discovery ==
At 15:44:06 UT on 7 Mar 2023, the Fermi Gamma-ray Burst Monitor (GBM) triggered and located GRB 230307A . at the same time, the Gravitational Wave High-energy Electromagnetic Counterpart All-sky Monitor light curve shows a roughly fast rise and exponential decay (FRED) shape with a possible precursor, with a total duration of ~100 sec. At 2023-03-07T15:44:09Z UT (Solar Orbiter onboard time), Spectrometer Telescope for Imaging X-rays (STIX) detected GRB 230307A. The gamma-ray burst signal can be clearly seen in the STIX quick-look light curves in the range between 10 - 84 keV. The GRB has a single peak and a duration of about 40 seconds. The AGILE team also reported hours, T0 =15:44:06 (UTC) The event lasted about 30 s and it released a total number of 527069 counts in the MCAL detector (above a background rate of 1154 Hz), and 920952 counts in the AC Top detector (above a background rate of 2959 Hz). The 2001 Mars Odyssey's Gamma Ray Spectrometer on Mars also reported it within 12 hours resulting in precisely estimating its incoming direction through Interplanetary Network triangulation. Tellurium (Te) in GRB 230307A was discovered in 2023 by using the James Webb's Space Telescope's (JWST) mid infrared data. JWST obtained mid-infrared (mid-IR) imaging and spectroscopy 29 and 61 days after the burst.

== See also ==
- Christmas burst (GRB 101225A) - a 28 minute long Gamma ray burst that occurred in December 25, 2010
