= NGC 5042 =

Galaxy in the constellation Hydra

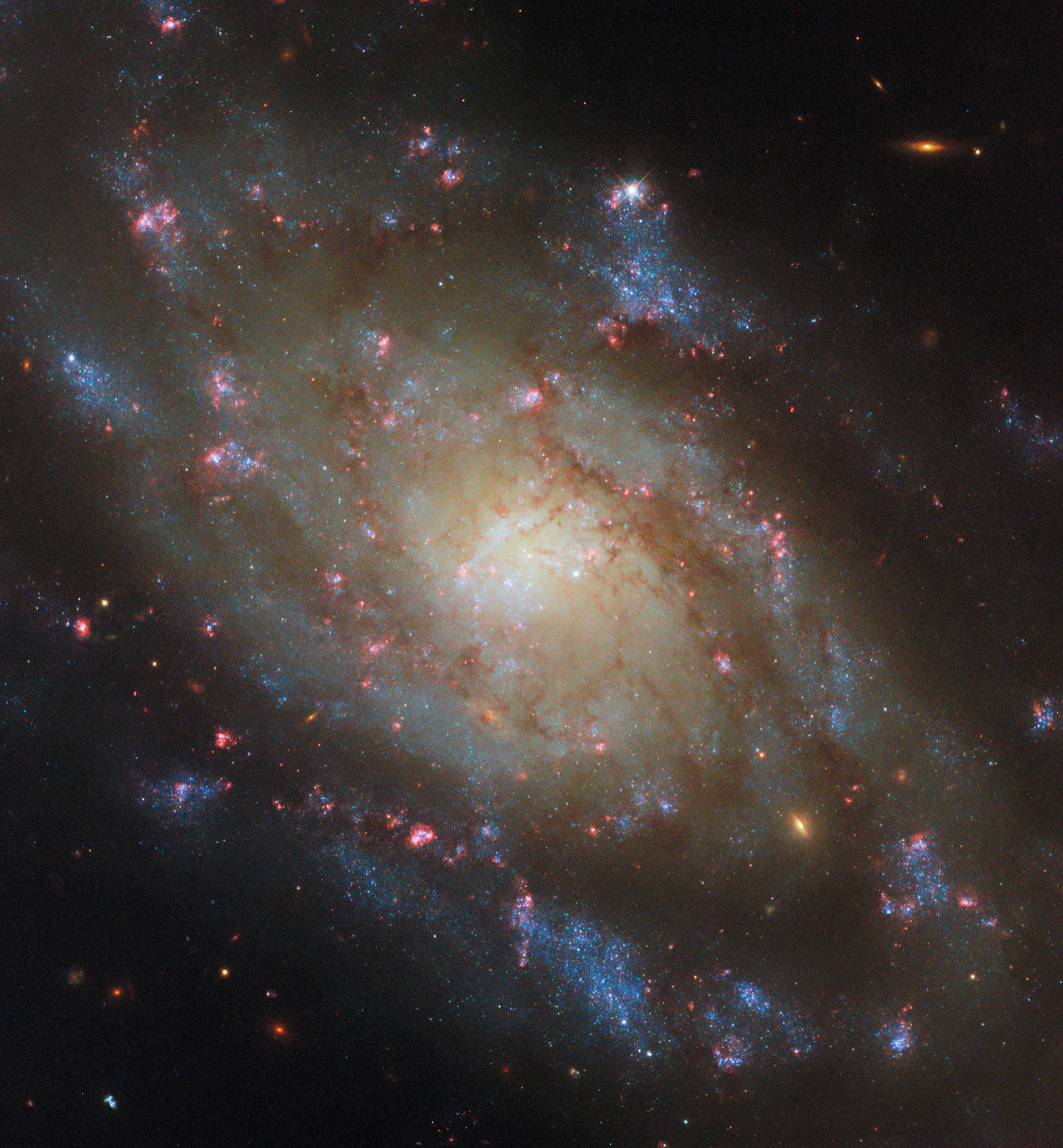
- NGC 5042 imaged by the Hubble Space Telescope

Observation data (J2000 epoch)
- Constellation: Hydra
- Right ascension: 13^{h} 15^{m} 31.1269^{s}
- Declination: −23° 59′ 00.958″
- Redshift: 0.004637
- Heliocentric radial velocity: 1,390±1 km/s
- Distance: 47.88 ± 2.37 Mly (14.680 ± 0.726 Mpc)
- Apparent magnitude (V): 11.8

Characteristics
- Type: SAB(rs)c
- Size: ~80,800 ly (24.77 kpc) (estimated)
- Apparent size (V): 4.2′ × 2.2′

Other designations
- ESO 508- G 031, IRAS 13127-2343, UGCA 340, MCG -04-31-043, PGC 46126

NGC 5042 is an intermediate spiral galaxy in the constellation of Hydra. Its velocity with respect to the cosmic microwave background for is 1,697±22 km/s, which corresponds to a Hubble distance of 81.6 ± 5.8 Mly (25.03 ± 1.78 Mpc). However, 15 non redshift measurements give a much closer distance of 47.88 ± 2.37 Mly (14.680 ± 0.726 Mpc). It was discovered by British astronomer John Herschel on 25 March 1836.

The Hubble Space Telescope's image of NGC 5042 shows its collection of H II regions, brilliant pink gas clouds in its spiral arms, getting their color from hydrogen atoms that have been ionized by ultraviolet light. Many of these clouds are associated with groups of blue stars, often appearing to form a shell around them.

== Image gallery ==
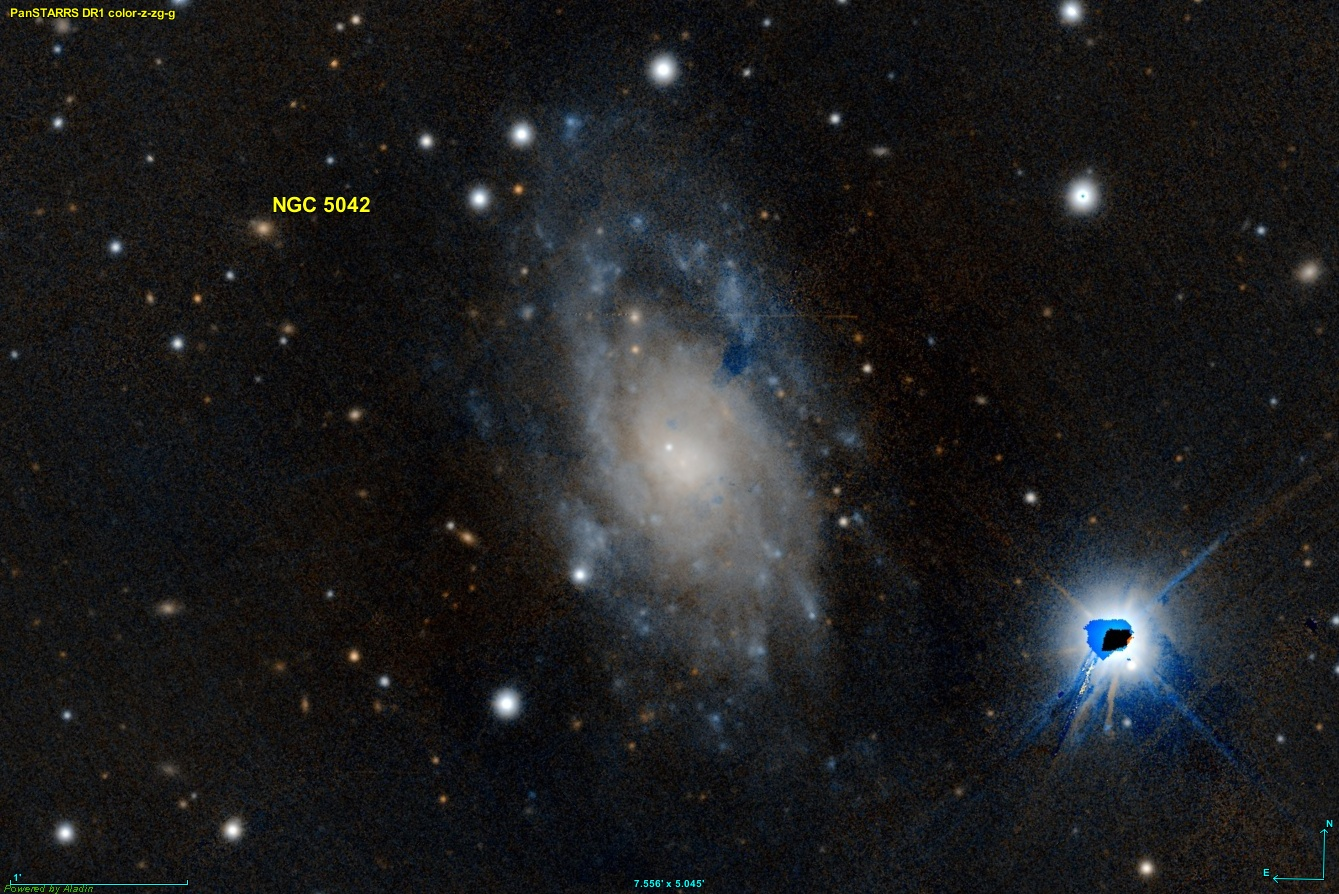
NGC 5042 imaged by Pan-STARRS

== See also ==
- List of NGC objects (5001–6000)
