= Chirp mass =

Effective mass of a binary system

In astrophysics, the chirp mass of a compact binary system determines the leading-order orbital evolution of the system as a result of energy loss from emitting gravitational waves. Because the gravitational wave frequency is determined by orbital frequency, the chirp mass also determines the frequency evolution of the gravitational wave signal emitted during a binary's inspiral phase. In gravitational wave data analysis, it is easier to measure the chirp mass than the two component masses alone.

== Definition from component masses ==
A two-body system with component masses $m_1$ and $m_2$ has a chirp mass of

$$\mathcal{M}=\frac{(m_1 m_2)^{3/5}}{(m_1+m_2)^{1/5}}$$

The chirp mass may also be expressed in terms of the total mass of the system $M = m_1 + m_2$ and other common mass parameters:

- the reduced mass $\mu = \frac{m_1 m_2}{m_1 + m_2}$:
  $$\mathcal{M} = \mu^{3/5} M^{2/5},$$
- the mass ratio $q = m_1/m_2$:
  $$\mathcal{M} = \left[ \frac{q}{(1+q)^2} \right]^{3/5} M,$$
  or
- the symmetric mass ratio $\eta = \frac{m_1 m_2}{(m_1 + m_2)^2} = \frac\mu M = \frac{q}{(1+q)^2} = \left( \frac {m_{\rm geo}}{M} \right)^2$:
  $$\mathcal{M} = \eta^{3/5} M.$$
  - The symmetric mass ratio reaches its maximum value $\eta = \frac 14$ when $m_1 = m_2$, and thus $\mathcal{M} = (1/4)^{3/5} M \approx 0.435\,M.$
- the geometric mean of the component masses $m_{geo} = \sqrt{m_1 m_2}$:
  $$\mathcal{M} = m_{\rm geo} \left(\frac{m_{\rm geo}}{M}\right)^{1/5},$$
  - If the two component masses are roughly similar, then the latter factor is close to $(1/2)^{1/5} = 0.871,$ so $\mathcal{M} \approx 0.871 \, m_{\rm geo}$. This multiplier decreases for unequal component masses but quite slowly. E.g. for a 3:1 mass ratio it becomes $\mathcal{M} = 0.846\,m_{\rm geo}$, while for a 10:1 mass ratio it is $\mathcal{M} = 0.779\,m_{\rm geo}.$

== Orbital evolution ==
In general relativity, the phase evolution of a binary orbit can be computed using a post-Newtonian expansion, a perturbative expansion in powers of the orbital velocity $v/c$. The first order gravitational wave frequency, $f$, evolution is described by the differential equation

$$\frac{\mathrm{d}f}{\mathrm{d}t}=\frac{96}{5}\pi^{8/3}\left(\frac{G\mathcal{M}}{c^{3}}\right)^{5/3}f^{11/3},$$

where $c$ and $G$ are the speed of light and Newton's gravitational constant, respectively.

If one is able to measure both the frequency $f$ and frequency derivative $\dot{f}$ of a gravitational wave signal, the chirp mass can be determined. (Note: Rewrite equation (1) to obtain the frequency evolution of gravitational waves from a coalescing binary: $\dot{f}=\frac{96}{5}\pi^{8/3}\left(\frac{G\mathcal{M}}{c^{3}}\right)^{5/3}f^{11/3}$ / 2; Integrating equation (2) with respect to time gives: $\frac{96}{5}\pi^{8/3}\left(\frac{G\mathcal{M}}{c^{3}}\right)^{5/3}t+\frac{3}{8}f^{-8/3}+C=0$ / 3; where C is the constant of integration. Furthermore, on identifying $x\equiv t$ and $y \equiv \frac{3}{8}f^{-8/3}$, the chirp mass can be calculated from the slope of the line fitted through the data points (x, y).)

$\mathcal{M}=\frac{c^{3}}{G}\left(\frac{5}{96}\pi^{-8/3}f^{-11/3}\dot{f}\right)^{3/5}$	1

To disentangle the individual component masses in the system one must additionally measure higher order terms in the post-Newtonian expansion.

== Mass-redshift degeneracy ==
One limitation of the chirp mass is that it is affected by redshift; what is actually derived from the observed gravitational waveform is the product
$$\mathcal{M}_o = \mathcal{M}(1+z)$$
where $z$ is the redshift. This redshifted chirp mass is larger (Note: While it is not physically impossible to have $z < 0$, that would require orbiting massive objects which are moving toward the observer, something that is not observed in practice.) than the source chirp mass, and can only be converted to a source chirp mass by finding the redshift $z$.

This is usually resolved by using the observed amplitude to find the chirp mass divided by distance, and solving both equations using Hubble's law to compute the relationship between distance and redshift. (Note: Crudely, begin with a guess at the redshift, use that to compute the source chirp mass and source amplitude, divide by the observed amplitude to determine the distance, use Hubble's law to convert the distance to a redshift, and use that as an improved guess to repeat the process until sufficient accuracy is reached.)

Xian Chen has pointed out that this assumes non-cosmological redshifts (peculiar velocity and gravitational redshift) are negligible, and questions this assumption. If a binary pair of stellar-mass black holes merge while closely orbiting a supermassive black hole (an extreme mass ratio inspiral), the observed gravitational wave would experience significant gravitational and doppler redshift, leading to a falsely low redshift estimate, and therefore a falsely high mass. He suggests that there are plausible reasons to suspect that the SMBH's accretion disc and tidal forces would enhance the merger rate of black hole binaries near it, and the consequent falsely high mass estimates would explain the unexpectedly large masses of observed black hole mergers. (The question would be best resolved by a lower-frequency gravitational wave detector such as LISA which could observe the extreme mass ratio inspiral waveform.)

== See also ==
- Reduced mass
- Two-body problem in general relativity
