= Neutron star merger =

Type of stellar collision

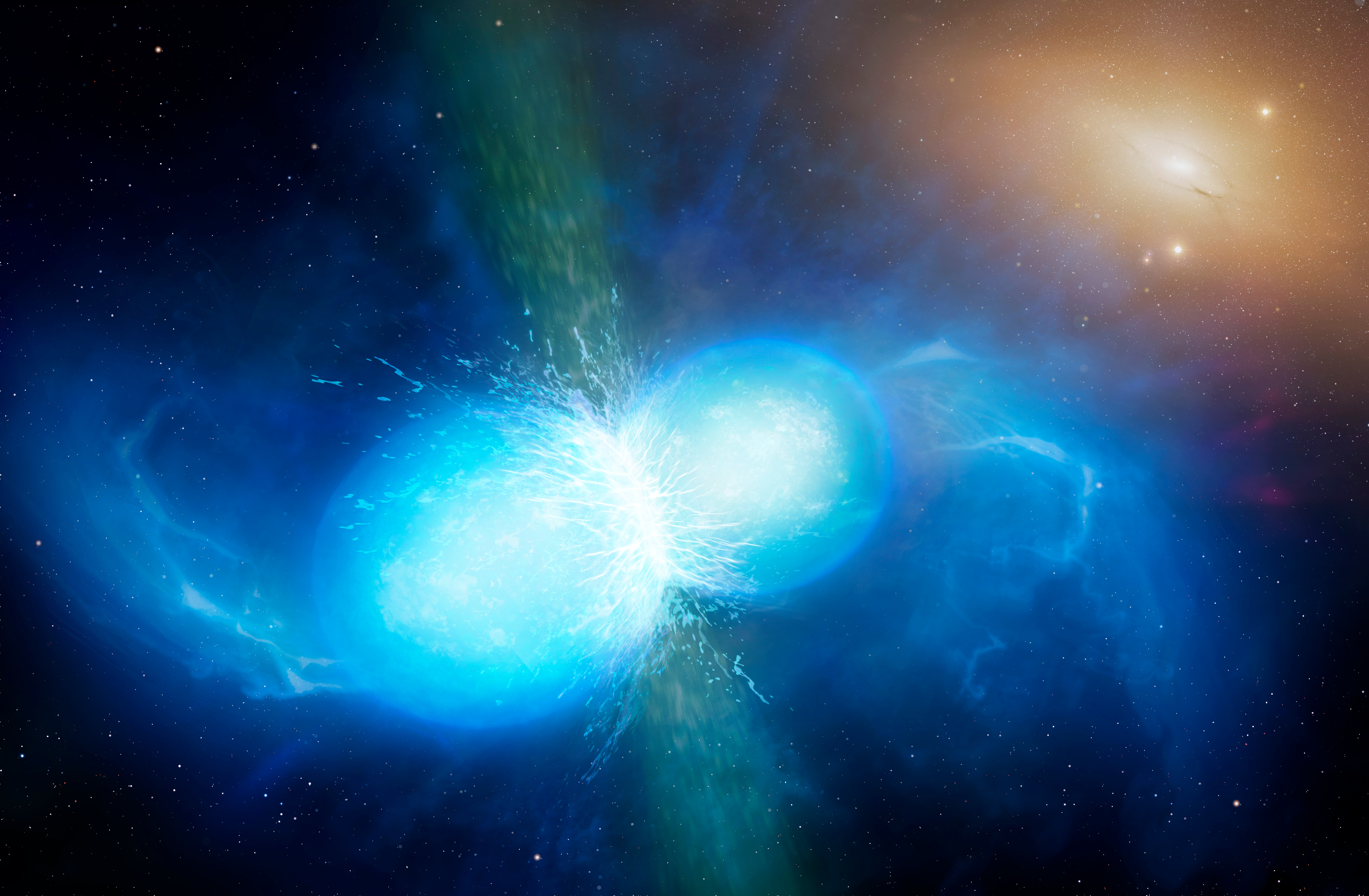
Artist's impression of neutron stars merging, producing gravitational waves and resulting in a kilonova

A neutron star merger is the stellar collision of neutron stars. When two neutron stars fall into mutual orbit, they gradually spiral inward due to the loss of energy emitted as gravitational radiation. When they finally meet, their merger leads to the formation of either a more massive neutron star, or—if the mass of the remnant exceeds the Tolman–Oppenheimer–Volkoff limit—a black hole. The merger can create a magnetic field that is trillions of times stronger than that of Earth in a matter of one or two milliseconds. The immediate event creates a short gamma-ray burst (sGRB) visible over hundreds of millions, or even billions of light-years.

The merger of neutron stars momentarily creates an environment of such extreme neutron flux that the r-process can occur. This reaction accounts for the nucleosynthesis of around half of the isotopes in elements heavier than iron.

The mergers also produce kilonovae, which are transient sources of isotropic, longer-wave electromagnetic radiation due to the radioactive decay of heavy r-process nuclei that are produced and ejected during the merger process. Kilonovae had been discussed as a possible r-process site since the reaction was first proposed in 1998, but the mechanism became widely accepted after multi-messenger event GW170817 was observed in 2017.

== Observed mergers ==
17 August 2017: Gravitational wave (GW170817) detected from merger of two neutron stars (00:23 video; artist concept)

On 17 August 2017, the LIGO and Virgo interferometers observed GW170817, a gravitational wave associated with the merger of a binary neutron star (BNS) system in NGC 4993, an elliptical galaxy in the constellation Hydra about 140 million light-years away. GW170817 co-occurred with a short (roughly 2-second-long) gamma-ray burst, GRB 170817A, first detected 1.7 seconds after the GW merger signal, and a visible light observational event first observed 11 hours afterwards, Swope Supernova Survey event 2017a (SSS17a).

The co-occurrence of GW170817 with GRB 170817A in both space and time summarily established that neutron star mergers produce short gamma-ray bursts. The subsequent detection of SSS17a in the area where GW170817 and GRB 170817A were known to have occurred—and its having the expected characteristics of a kilonova—showed that neutron star mergers are responsible for kilonovae as well.

In 2018, astronomers reported that GRB 150101B, a much more distant short gamma-ray burst detected in 2015, may also be the result of the merger of neutron stars. The similarities between the event and GW170817 in terms of gamma-ray, optical and x-ray emissions, as well as to the nature of the associated host galaxies, were characterized as "striking", suggesting that neutron star mergers and their associated kilonovae may be more common in the universe than previously understood. Later that year, the Zwicky Transient Facility joined the tracking network for follow-up observations triggered by gravitational wave events.

Also that year, scientists presented a new way to use information from gravitational wave events (especially those involving the merger of neutron stars like GW170817) to determine the Hubble constant, which establishes the rate of expansion of the universe. The two earlier methods for finding the Hubble constant—one based on redshifts and another based on the cosmic distance ladder—disagree by about 10%. This difference, the Hubble tension, might be reconciled by using kilonovae as another type of standard candle.

In April 2019, the LIGO and Virgo gravitational wave observatories announced the detection of GW190425, a candidate event that is, with a probability 99.94%, the merger of two neutron stars. Despite extensive follow-up observations, no electromagnetic counterpart could be identified.

In December 2022, astronomers reported observing GRB 211211A for 51 seconds, the first evidence of a long GRB associated with the merger of a "compact binary object", thus potentially including a BNS. Following this, GRB 191019A (2019, 64s) and GRB 230307A (2023, 35s) have been argued to belong to this emerging class of neutron star merger as long GRB progenitor. The indirect reasoning includes co-observations of kilonovae, for example the detection of tellurium and lanthanide in the spectral aftermath of the 2023 event.

=== CDT-S XT2 (magnetar) ===
In 2019, analysis of data from the Chandra X-ray Observatory revealed another binary neutron star merger at a distance of 6.6 billion light-years, an x-ray signal called XT2. The merger produced a magnetar; its emissions could be detected for several hours.

== Effect on Earth ==
Neutron star mergers emit an unusually diverse range of radiations which can be harmful to life on earth, including the initial short gamma-ray burst, emission from the radioactive decay of heavy elements scattered by the sGRB cocoon, the sGRB afterglow itself, and cosmic rays accelerated by the blast. In order of arrival, the (harmless) gravitational waves arrive first, the sGRB and afterglow photons seconds to hours after, with the cosmic ray particles arriving hundreds to thousands of years later.

The lethal zone of the highly directional sGRB component extends hundreds of parsecs along the direction of its beam. These high-energy gamma ray photons would extinguish life directly, through thermal stress, molecular breakdown, and terminal radiation damage to both plants and animals.

Apart from an unlucky hit by a directed sGRB beam, any neutron star merger occurring within 10 parsecs of Earth would also result in conclusive human extinction. The ejected material sweeps up the interstellar medium and creates a supernova-remnant-like bubble holding a lethal dose of cosmic rays. If the Earth were to be engulfed by the remnant, these cosmic rays would destroy the ozone layer, exposing Earth's biome to fatal levels of UVB radiation from the Sun. They could also interact with the atmosphere, yielding weakly-interacting muons. The flux density of these generated particles would be sufficient to sterilize the planet, penetrating even deep into caves and underwater. The danger to life lies in the particles' ability to disrupt DNA, causing birth defects and mutations.

Relative to supernovae, binary neutron star (BNS) mergers influence about the same volume of space, but are thought to be much rarer, and their most dangerous sGRB component requires that the beam be precisely oriented towards the Earth. Accordingly, the overall threat of a BNS event to human extinction is extremely low.
