= GW170817 =

Gravitational-wave signal detected in 2017

- The GW170817 signal as measured by the LIGO and gravitational wave detectors. Image includes Virgo data despite signal being in its blind spot (and thus not present)
- Event type: Gravitational wave
- Date: 130 million years ago (detected 17 August 2017, 12:41:04.4 UTC)
- Duration: c. 1 minute and 40 seconds
- Instrument: LIGO, Virgo
- Right ascension: 13^{h} 09^{m} 48.08^{s}
- Declination: −23° 22′ 53.3″
- Epoch: J2000.0
- Distance: 144 million ly
- Redshift: 0.0099
- Host: NGC 4993
- Progenitor: 2 neutron stars
- Other designations: GW170817
- Related media on Commons

GW170817 was a gravitational wave (GW) observed by the LIGO and Virgo detectors on 17 August 2017, originating within the shell elliptical galaxy NGC 4993, about 130 million light-years away. The wave was produced by the last moments of the inspiral of a binary pair of neutron stars, ending with their merger. It is the first GW detection to be definitively correlated with any electromagnetic observation.

Unlike the five prior GW detections—which were of merging black holes and thus not expected to have detectable electromagnetic signals—the aftermath of this merger was seen across the electromagnetic spectrum by 70 observatories on 7 continents and in space, marking a significant breakthrough for multi-messenger astronomy. The discovery and subsequent observations of GW170817 were given the Breakthrough of the Year award for 2017 by the journal Science.

GW170817 had an audible duration of approximately 100 seconds and exhibited the characteristic intensity and frequency expected of the inspiral of two neutron stars. Analysis of the slight variation in arrival time of the GW at the three detector locations (two LIGO and one Virgo) yielded an approximate angular direction to the source. Independently, a short gamma-ray burst (sGRB) of around 2 seconds, designated GRB 170817A, was detected by the Fermi and INTEGRAL spacecraft beginning 1.7 seconds after the GW emitted by the merger. These detectors have very limited directional sensitivity, but indicated a large region of the sky which overlapped the gravitational wave direction. The co-occurrence confirmed a long-standing hypothesis that neutron star mergers describe an important class of sGRB progenitor event.

An intense observing campaign was prioritized, to scan the region indicated by the sGRB/GW detection for the expected emission at optical wavelengths. During this search, 11 hours after the signal, an astronomical transient SSS17a, later designated kilonova AT 2017gfo, was observed in the galaxy NGC 4993. It was captured by numerous telescopes in other electromagnetic bands, from radio to X-ray wavelengths, over the following days and weeks. It was found to be a fast-moving, rapidly-cooling cloud of neutron-rich material, as expected of debris ejected from a neutron-star merger.

== Announcement ==
It's the first time that we've observed a cataclysmic astrophysical event in both gravitational waves and electromagnetic waves—our cosmic messengers.

— David Reitze, LIGO executive director

The observations were officially announced on 16 October 2017 at press conferences at the National Press Club in Washington, D.C., and at the ESO headquarters in Garching bei München in Germany.

Some information was leaked before the official announcement, beginning on 18 August 2017 when astronomer J. Craig Wheeler of the University of Texas at Austin tweeted "New LIGO. Source with optical counterpart. Blow your sox off!" He later deleted the tweet and apologized for scooping the official announcement embargo. Others followed up on the rumor, and reported that the public logs of several major telescopes had listed priority interruptions in order to observe NGC 4993, a galaxy 40 Mpc (130 Mly) away in the constellation Hydra. The collaboration had earlier declined to comment on the rumors, not adding to a previous announcement that there were several triggers under analysis.

== Gravitational wave detection ==
This NASA animation represents phenomena observed up to nine days after GW170817.

The gravitational wave signal lasted for approximately 100 seconds (much longer than the few seconds measured for binary black hole mergers) starting from a frequency of 24 hertz. It covered approximately 3,000 cycles, increasing in amplitude and frequency to a few hundred hertz in the typical inspiral chirp pattern, ending with the collision received at 12:41:04.4 UTC. It arrived first at the Virgo detector in Italy, then 22 milliseconds later at the LIGO-Livingston detector in Louisiana, United States, and another 3 milliseconds later at the LIGO-Hanford detector in the state of Washington, in the United States. The signal was detected and analyzed by a comparison with a prediction from general relativity calculated using the post-Newtonian expansion.

An automatic computer search of the LIGO-Hanford datastream triggered an alert to the LIGO team about 6 minutes after the event. The gamma-ray alert had already been issued at this point (16 seconds post-event), so the timing near-coincidence was automatically flagged. The LIGO/Virgo team issued a preliminary alert (with only the crude gamma-ray position) to astronomers in the follow-up teams at 40 minutes post-event.

Sky localisation of the event required combining data from the three interferometers, but this was delayed by two problems. The Virgo data were delayed by a data transmission problem, and the LIGO Livingston data were contaminated by a brief burst of instrumental noise a few seconds prior to the event peak, which persisted parallel to the rising transient signal in the lowest frequencies. These required manual analysis and interpolation before the sky location could be announced about 4.5 hours after the event. The three detections localized the source to an area of 31 square degrees in the southern sky at 90% probability. More detailed calculations later refined the localization to within 28 square degrees. In particular, the absence of a clear detection by the Virgo interferometer implied that the source was localized within one of its blind spots, a constraint which reduced the search area considerably.

== Gamma ray detection ==
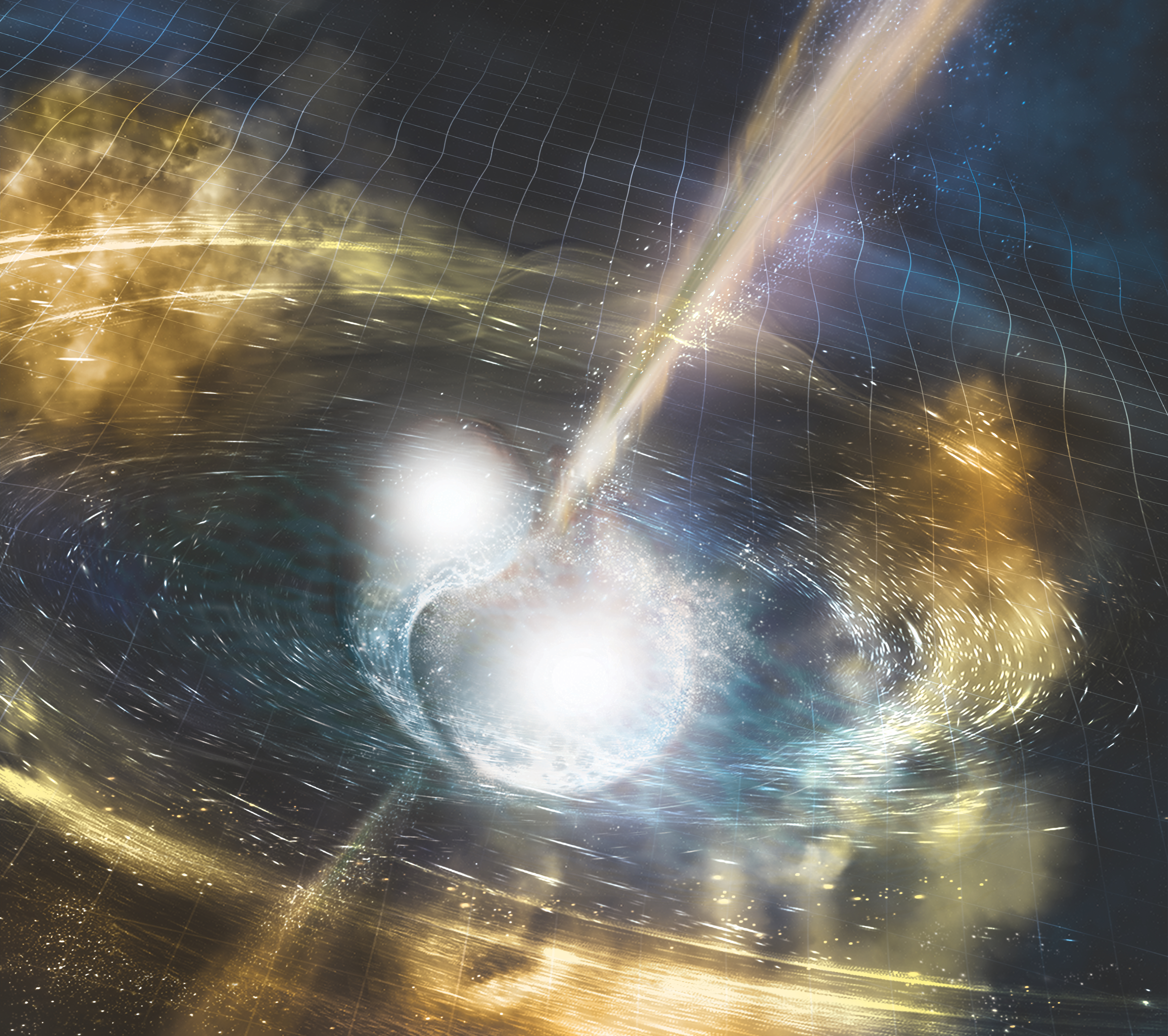
Artistic concept: two neutron stars merge

The first electromagnetic signal detected was GRB 170817A, a short gamma-ray burst, detected 1.74±0.05 s after the merger time and lasting for about 2 seconds.

GRB 170817A was first recorded by the Fermi Gamma-ray Space Telescope, which issued an automatic alert just 14 seconds after the detection. After the LIGO/Virgo circular 40 minutes later, manual processing of data from the INTEGRAL gamma-ray telescope retrieved independent data for the event. The difference in arrival time between Fermi and INTEGRAL helped to improve the sky localization.

This GRB was relatively faint given the proximity of the host galaxy NGC 4993, possibly due to its jets not being pointed directly toward Earth, but rather at an angle of about 30 degrees off axis.

== Electromagnetic follow-up ==
Hubble picture of NGC 4993 with inset showing GRB 170817A over 6 days. Credit: NASA and ESA

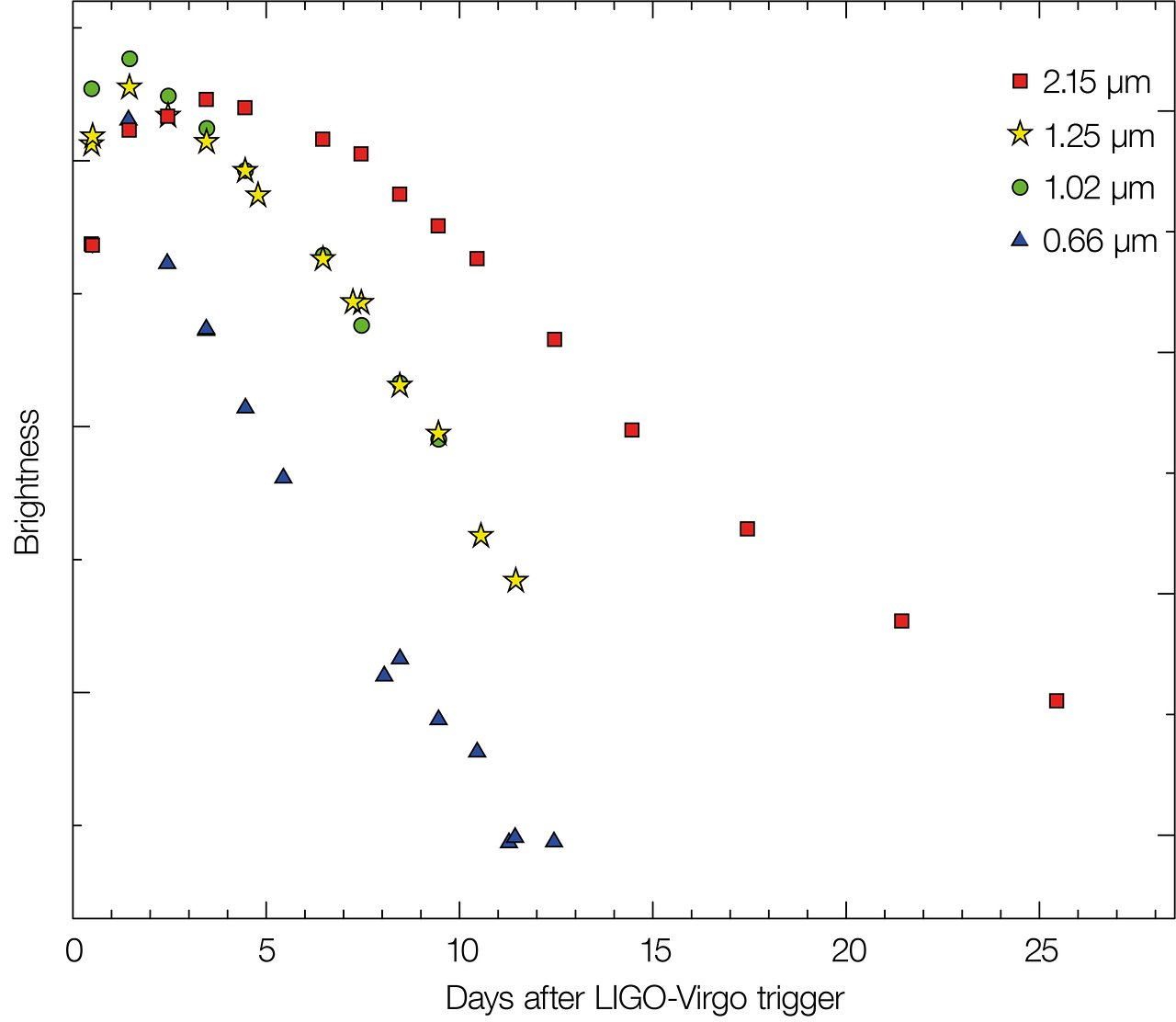
Light curves at various wavelengths of kilonova in NGC 4993

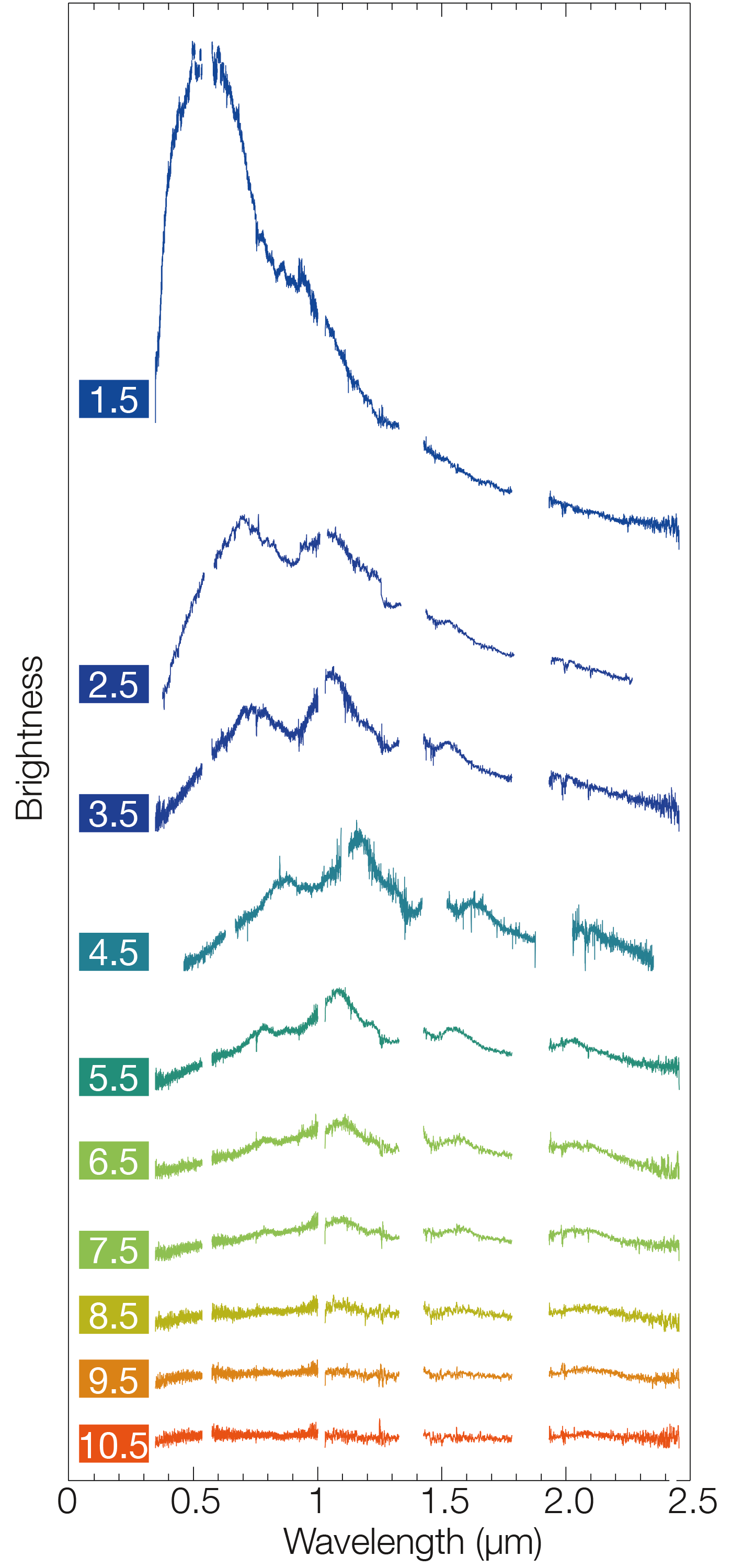
The change in optical and near-infrared spectra by number of days after detection

A series of alerts to other astronomers were issued, beginning with a report of the gamma-ray detection and single-detector LIGO trigger at 13:21 UTC, and a three-detector sky location at 17:54 UTC. These prompted a massive search by many survey and robotic telescopes. In addition to the expected large size of the search area (about 150 times the area of a full moon), this search was challenging because the search area was near the Sun in the sky and thus visible for at most a few hours after dusk for any given telescope.

In total six teams (One-Meter, Two Hemispheres (1M2H), DLT40, VISTA, MASTER, DECam, and Las Cumbres Observatory (Chile)) imaged the same new source independently in a 90-minute interval. The first to detect optical light associated with the collision was the 1M2H team running the Swope Supernova Survey, which found it in an image of NGC 4993 taken 10 hours and 52 minutes after the GW event by the 1-meter diameter (3.3 ft) Swope Telescope operating in the near infrared at Las Campanas Observatory, Chile. They were also the first to announce it, naming their detection SSS17a in a circular issued 12^{h}26^{m} post-event. The new source was later given an official International Astronomical Union (IAU) designation AT 2017gfo.

The 1M2H team surveyed all galaxies in the region of space predicted by the gravitational wave observations, and identified a single new transient. By identifying the host galaxy of the merger, it is possible to provide an accurate distance consistent with that based on gravitational waves alone.

The detection of the optical and near-infrared source provided a huge improvement in localisation, reducing the uncertainty from several degrees to 0.0001 degree; this enabled many large ground and space telescopes to follow up the source over the following days and weeks. Within hours after localization, many additional observations were made across the infrared and visible spectrum. Over the following days, the color of the optical source changed from blue to red as the source expanded and cooled.

Numerous optical and infrared spectra were observed; early spectra were nearly featureless, but after a few days, broad features emerged indicative of material ejected at roughly 10 percent of light speed. There are multiple strong lines of evidence that AT 2017gfo is indeed the aftermath of GW170817. The color evolution and spectra are dramatically different from any known supernova. The distance of NGC 4993 is consistent with that independently estimated from the GW signal. No other transient has been found in the GW sky localisation region. Finally, various archive images show nothing at the location of AT 2017gfo, ruling out a foreground variable star in the Milky Way.

The source was detected in the ultraviolet (but not in X-rays) 15.3 hours after the event by the Swift Gamma-Ray Burst Mission. After initial lack of X-ray and radio detections, the source was detected in X-rays 9 days later using the Chandra X-ray Observatory, and 16 days later in the radio using the Karl G. Jansky Very Large Array (VLA) in New Mexico. More than 70 observatories covering the electromagnetic spectrum observed the source.

The radio and X-ray light increased to a peak 150 days after the merger, diminishing afterwards. Astronomers have monitored the optical afterglow of GW170817 using the Hubble Space Telescope. The remnant finally began to fade in X-ray observations taken in 2018, 260 days after the merger. Even so, continued X-ray emission at 5-sigma was observed by the Chandra Observatory 940 days after the merger.

== Other detectors ==
No neutrinos consistent with the source were found in follow-up searches by the IceCube and ANTARES neutrino observatories and the Pierre Auger Observatory. A possible explanation for the non-detection of neutrinos is because the event was observed at a large off-axis angle and thus the outflow jet was not directed towards Earth.

== Astrophysical origin and products ==
The origin and properties (masses and spins) of a double neutron star system like GW170817 are the result of a long sequence of complex binary star interactions. The gravitational wave signal indicated that it was produced by the collision of two neutron stars with a total mass of 2.82+0.47
−0.09 solar masses (M_{☉}). If low spins are assumed, consistent with those observed in binary neutron stars expected to merge within (twice (Note: Without a Bayesian prior, the expected periodicity of a time series based on a single observation converges towards two times the observing period.)) the Hubble time, the total mass is 2.74+0.04
−0.01 M_{☉}.

The masses of the progenitor stars have greater uncertainty. The chirp mass, a directly observable parameter which may be roughly equated to the geometric mean of the prior masses, was measured at 1.188+0.004
−0.002 M_{☉}. The larger progenitor (m_{1}) has a 90% probability of being between 1.36 and 2.26 M_{☉}, and the smaller (m_{2}) has a 90% probability of being between 0.86 and 1.36 M_{☉}. Under the low spin assumption, the ranges are 1.36 to 1.60 M_{☉} for m_{1} and 1.17 to 1.36 M_{☉} for m_{2}, inside a 12 km radius.

A hypermassive neutron star was believed to have formed initially, as evidenced by the large amount of ejecta (much of which would have been trapped by an immediately forming black hole). At first, the lack of evidence for emissions being powered by neutron star spindown, which would occur for longer-surviving neutron stars, suggested it collapsed into a black hole within milliseconds. However, a more detailed analysis of the GW170817 signal tail later found evidence of further features consistent with the seconds-long spindown of an intermediate or remnant hypermassive magnetar, and the energy of this spindown was estimated at ≃63 Foe, equivalent to 3.5% of the mass-energy of the Sun. This was below the estimated sensitivity of the LIGO search algorithms at the time. This was confirmed in 2023 by a statistically independent method of analysis revealing the central engine of GRB 170817A.

The short gamma-ray burst was followed over the next several months by its slower-evolving kilonova counterpart, a spherically expanding optical afterglow powered by the radioactive decay of heavy r-process nuclei produced and ejected at the initial cataclysmic instant. GW170817 therefore confirmed neutron star mergers to be viable sites for the r-process, where the nucleosynthesis of around half the isotopes in elements heavier than iron can occur. A total of 16,000 times the mass of the Earth in heavy elements is believed to have formed, including approximately 10 Earth masses just of the two elements gold and platinum. The electromagnetic emission is estimated at 0.5% of the mass-energy of the Sun.

As of 2025, the precise nature of the ultimately stable compact remnant remains uncertain.

== Scientific importance ==
Scientific interest in the event was enormous, with dozens of preliminary papers (and almost 100 preprints) published the day of the announcement, including 8 letters in Science, 6 in Nature, and 32 in a special issue of The Astrophysical Journal Letters devoted to the subject. The interest and effort was global: The paper describing the multi-messenger observations is authored by almost 4,000 astronomers (about one-third of the worldwide astronomical community) from more than 900 institutions, using more than 70 observatories on all 7 continents and in space.

Theoretical work had predicted that gravitational waves propagated at exactly the speed of light in vacuum. The event provided a limit on the difference between the speed of light in vacuum and that of gravity. Assuming the first photons were emitted between zero and ten seconds after peak gravitational wave emission, the difference between the speeds of gravitational and electromagnetic waves, $v_{\text{GW}} - v_{\text{EM}}$, is constrained to be between −3×10^{−15} and +7×10^{−16} times the speed of light, which improves on the previous estimate by about 14 orders of magnitude. (Note: The previous constraint on the difference between the speeds of light and gravity was about ±20%.)

In addition, GW170817 allowed investigation of the equivalence principle (through Shapiro delay measurement) and Lorentz invariance. The limits of possible violations of Lorentz invariance (values of "gravity sector coefficients") are reduced by the new observations by up to ten orders of magnitude.

The event also excluded some alternatives to general relativity, including variants of scalar–tensor theory, Hořava–Lifshitz gravity, Dark Matter Emulators, and bimetric gravity, Furthermore, an analysis published in July 2018 used GW170817 to show that gravitational waves propagate fully through the (3+1)–dimensional curved spacetime described by general relativity, ruling out hypotheses involving "leakage" into higher, non-compact spatial dimensions. (Note: Compactified dimensions cannot be ruled out by GW studies because the fundamental diffraction limit for waves with frequencies in the tens to hundreds of Hz limits their probative resolution to scales no smaller than thousands of kilometers, leaving features below this scale unresolved.)

Gravitational wave signals such as GW170817 may be used as a standard siren to provide an independent measurement of the Hubble constant. An initial estimate of the constant derived from the observation is 70.0+12.0
−8.0 (km/s)/Mpc, broadly consistent with current best estimates. Further studies improved the measurement to 70.3+5.3
−5.0 (km/s)/Mpc. Together with the observation of future events of this kind, the uncertainty was predicted to reach two percent within five years and one percent within ten years. As of January 2025, however, no additional gravitational-wave detections of neutron star mergers had been localized by electromagnetic observation.

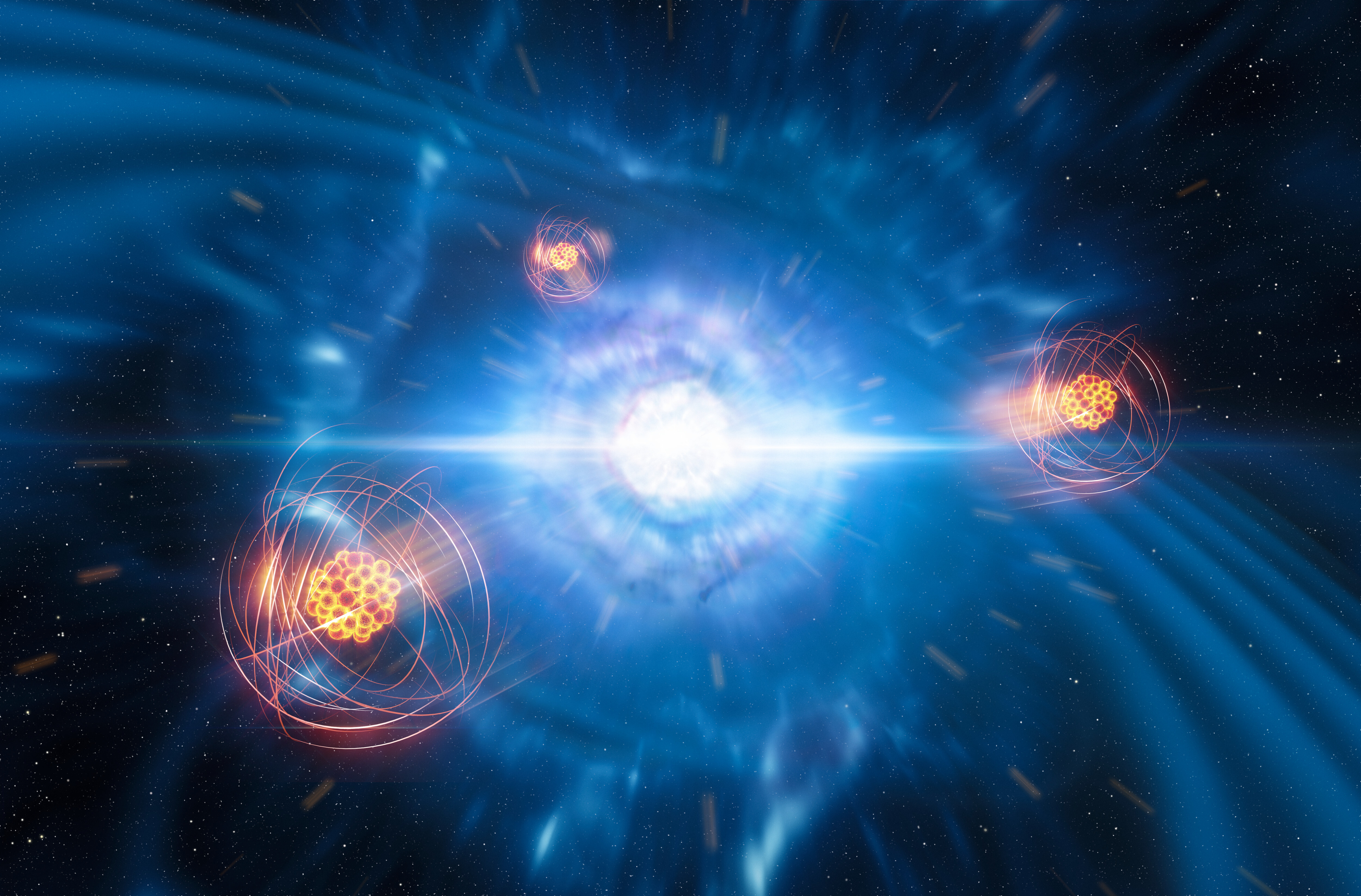
Artist's impression of strontium emerging from a neutron star merger.

Analyses of GW170817 provide more information on the dynamics of the mergers of neutron stars. Electromagnetic observations indicate that these events are responsible for nucleosynthesis via the rapid neutron capture or r-process—previously assumed to be associated with supernova explosions—and are therefore the primary source of r-process elements heavier than iron, including gold and platinum. The first identification of r-process elements in a neutron star merger was obtained during a re-analysis of GW170817 spectra. The spectra provided direct proof of strontium production during such an event. Since then, several r-process elements have been identified in the ejecta including yttrium, lanthanum and cerium. However, GW170817 alone is insufficient for ascertaining the yields of the production of heavy elements.

GW170817 alone has enabled an empirical determination of the maximum mass for a neutron star, the Tolman–Oppenheimer–Volkoff limit, to be around 2.01 to 2.16 $M_{\odot}$ (solar masses), though there are known neutron stars that are heavier, such as PSR J0952−0607 (2.35 $M_{\odot}$). This observation also helped constrain the equation of state for dense nuclear matter and the possible range of radii for neutron stars. In September 2018, astronomers reported related studies about possible mergers of neutron stars (NS) and white dwarfs (WD): including NS–NS, NS–WD, and WD–WD mergers.

In October 2017, Stephen Hawking, in what turned out to be his last broadcast interview, discussed the overall scientific importance of GW170817. He mentioned an independent determination of cosmological distances, the formation of heavy elements, the birth of black holes, testing general relativity in the strong–field regime, and the behavior of matter at extreme densities.

== Retrospective comparisons ==
In October 2018, astronomers reported that, in retrospect, an sGRB event detected in 2015 (GRB 150101B) may represent an earlier case of the same astrophysics reported for GW170817. The similarities between the two events in terms of gamma ray, optical, and x-ray emissions, as well as to the nature of the associated host galaxies, were considered "striking", suggesting that the earlier event may also be the result of a neutron star merger, and that together these may signify a hitherto-unknown class of kilonova transients, making kilonovae more diverse and common in the universe than previously understood.

Later research further construed GRB 160821B—another sGRB predating GW170817—also to belong to this class, again based on afterglow resemblance to the AT 2017gfo signature.

== See also ==
- Gravitational-wave astronomy
- Nuclear astrophysics
- List of gravitational wave observations
- Hulse–Taylor pulsar
