= Patrizia Caraveo =

Italian astrophysicist (born 1954)

Patrizia Caraveo OMRI
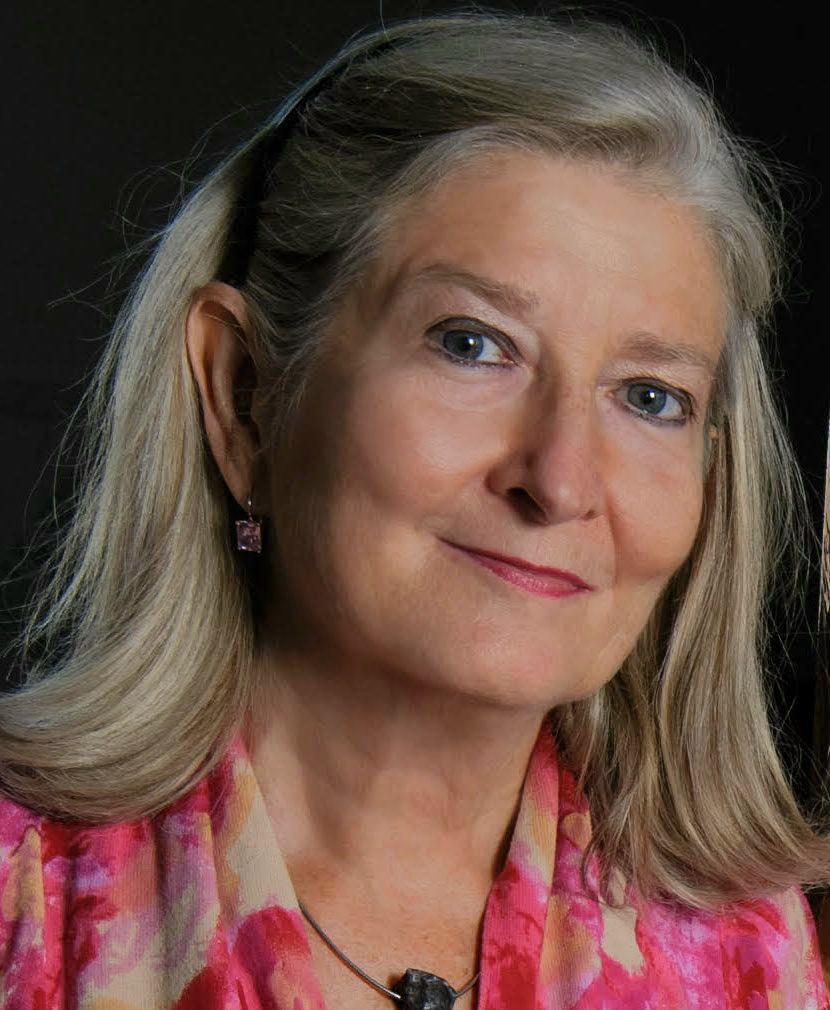
- Caraveo in 2018
- Born: Patrizia Annunciata Caraveo; April 8, 1954 (age 72); Milan, Italy
- Education: University of Milan
- Occupation: Astrophysicist
- Organizations: European Space Agency; International Astronomical Union; Italian Astronomical Society
- Spouse: Giovanni Bignami (m. 1991; died 2017)
- Awards: Bruno Rossi Prize (2007, 2011, 2012); Italian National Presidential Award (2009)
- Scientific career
- Workplaces: National Institute for Astrophysics; University of Pavia; Istituto Veneto di Scienze, Lettere ed Arti

Patrizia Annunciata Caraveo (Italian pronunciation: [paˈtrittsja annunˈtʃaːta karaˈvɛːo]; born April 8, 1954) is an Italian astrophysicist. She is a Research Director at the Italian National Institute for Astrophysics (INAF) and has served as Director of the Institute of Space Astrophysics and Cosmic Physics (IASF Milan). Caraveo is known for her contributions to the identification and study of gamma-ray sources, particularly her work on the radio-quiet pulsar Geminga, which established new methods for identifying high-energy astronomical objects through multiwavelength observations.

== Biography ==
Patrizia Caraveo graduated in Physics at the University of Milan in 1977. After receiving her degree in physics from the University of Milan in 1977, Caraveo began her research career at the Institute of Cosmic Physics of the Italian National Research Council (CNR) before joining the National Institute for Astrophysics (INAF) following its establishment. She became a Research Director at INAF in 2002 and subsequently, from 2011 to 2017, served as Director of the Institute of Space Astrophysics and Cosmic Physics (IASF Milan), where she oversaw research programs in high-energy astrophysics and space science.

Caraveo has played scientific roles in several international space missions dedicated to gamma-ray and X-ray astronomy, including the European COS-B and INTEGRAL missions, the Italian Space Agency's AGILE mission, and NASA's Swift and Fermi Gamma-ray Space Telescope missions. She did also coordinate INAF's participation in the Cherenkov Telescope Array (CTA), an international observatory for very-high-energy gamma-ray astronomy.

In addition to her research, Caraveo has been active in science communication and higher education. Since 1997 she has taught astronomy as an adjunct professor at the University of Pavia and has authored several popular science books on astrophysics, neutron stars, and space exploration. In 2025 she was elected President of the Italian Astronomical Society (Società Astronomica Italiana).

== Research ==
Her first ten years' research were devoted almost entirely to the analysis and interpretation of data collected from gamma astronomy satellite Cos-B, and the beginning of the study of X-ray astronomy with the analysis of data collected by the Einstein Observatory and EXOSAT. In the following period, her interests widened to include all of multi-wavelength astronomy, especially optical astronomy and interpretation of its results.

Since her thesis work, Caraveo has taken part in the development of multi-wavelength observations that led to the discovery and understanding of the neutron star Geminga. This required the use of multiple optical instruments both on the ground and in space. She has used observations from satellites such as SAS-2, HEAO-1, Cos-B, Einstein, EXOSAT, Ginga, ROSAT, Egret, EUVE, Hubble, Hipparcos, XMM-Newton, and Chandra, in addition to ground-based telescopes such as the Very Large Array. The results of Geminga have opened a new chapter in astrophysics: the study of unidentified gamma-ray sources. This is now one of the main topics of research by several groups around the world.

Her identification of Geminga, the first neutron star to show no radio emissions, has opened the way for a more general study of the phenomenology and number of optical pulsars. Caraveo and her team are dedicated to studying the color, motions, and distances of neutron stars, along with the relationship between neutron stars and young supernova remnants. With the use of parallax with Geminga, Caraveo accomplished the first optical measurement of the distance to an isolated neutron star. The correlation of data from Hipparcos with images from the Hubble Space Telescope to determine the absolute position of the faint optical counterpart of Geminga, was chosen by the European Space Agency as one of the 30 success stories presented at the Ministerial Conference in May 1999 (see ESA BR 147).

The 20-year long chase for the counterpart of Geminga has been the topic of an invited review paper written with Giovanni Bignami for the Annual Review of Astronomy and Astrophysics entitled Geminga: its Phenomenology, its Fraternity and its Physics .

Caraveo's continuous improvement to the techniques of analysis of data from the Hubble Space Telescope allowed the measurement of the proper motion of the Crab Pulsar and then proper motion and parallax of the pulsar in the constellation of Sails, yielding a result much closer than she had expected. In both cases there was a significant alignment between the direction of the proper motion vector and the X-ray jets revealed by these two neutron stars. This alignment has profound implications for the physics of the explosion of supernovae.

Using the telescope XMM-Newton, Caraveo has contributed to the first direct measurement of the magnetic field of an isolated neutron star, thanks to the discovery of cyclotron absorption lines in the data source 1E1207-59, a neutron star at the center of a supernova with no radio counterpart.

The high sensitivity of XMM-Newton has also resulted in two major findings on Geminga. The star, as it moves with supersonic speed in the interstellar medium, generates a shock wave that produces a train of X-rays. This allows scientists to probe both the density of the interstellar medium and the energy of the accelerated electrons from the source. The result, with Caraveo as first author, was published in Science, on September 5, 2003, which devoted its cover to XMM-Newton, and has received coverage in the Italian and world press. . Observations from Chandra also revealed a tail that follows the pulsar, perfectly aligned with its proper motion. It could be the PWN (pulsar wind nebula) of Geminga. While several other pulsars have comet tails of this type, the combination between the large structures revealed by XMM-Newton and the new data from Chandra is unprecedented.

The data accumulated by XMM-Newton enabled Caraveo to take a significant step in understanding Geminga through studying the spectrum of the source as a function of phase. This suggests that some observations of the star are due to a small hot spot which rotates with the star. The result, with Caraveo as first author, published in Science on July 16, 2004, is of great importance for the understanding of the physics of neutron stars, as the technique developed for Geminga is applicable to other neutron stars.

Geminga is not the only example of a pulsar without radio emission. The satellite Fermi has discovered dozens of others, demonstrating that the predictions made on the basis of the phenomenology of Geminga were fundamentally correct.

In 2013 she was invited to write a review paper on gamma-ray pulsars for Annual Review of Astronomy and Astrophysics. The paper entitled Gamma-Ray Pulsar Revolution was published in 2014.

Following the publication of the catalog of gamma sources revealed by Fermi, Caraveo coordinated a program centered on the study of unidentified gamma-ray sources. The purpose of the exercise is to find sources with the highest ratio of X-ray to optical emissions, one of the characteristic signs of neutron stars.

== Coordination efforts ==
In addition to data analysis, Caraveo was responsible for the study and planning of new missions. She was part of the Astronomy Working Group of the European Space Agency and contributed to the study and selection of new missions.

After involvement in the spectrometer of INTEGRAL, Caraveo was part of the group proposing ESA's participation in the James Webb Space Telescope (then the New Generation Space Telescope) In parallel, Caraveo took part in the development of new high-energy astrophysics missions such as the AGILE mission of the Italian Space Agency and the Swift and GLAST missions of NASA, for which she holds the position of Co-Investigator.

Caraveo is also responsible for the contract the Italian Space Agency (ASI) signed for the financing of activities related to astrophysical mission GLAST (now Fermi) of NASA.

Within ASTRONET, Caraveo was co-chair of the panel dedicated to high-energy astrophysics.

Caraveo was vice-coordinator of the panel of Italy's aerospace National Operational Program (NOP).

She was also responsible for the participation of INAF in the Cherenkov Telescope Array now being built under the management of the CTAO (Chrenkov Telescope Array Observator, an European Research Organization Consortium whose HQ are located at the INAF premises in Bologna.

== Recent research ==
In recent years, Caraveo has continued to contribute to international collaborations in gamma-ray astronomy. She was a co-author of the Third Fermi Large Area Telescope Catalog of Gamma-Ray Pulsars (2023), providing the census of gamma-ray pulsars detected by the Fermi mission.

Her research has examined the brightest gamma-ray burst ever observed, GRB 221009A (2024), periodic gamma-ray modulation in the blazar PG 1553+113 (2024), and extended gamma-ray emission associated with pulsar environments in the Milky Way. Caraveo is also involved in the scientific exploitation of data from the Fermi Large Area Telescope, contributing to investigations of gamma-ray transients, active galactic nuclei, supernova remnants, and other high-energy astrophysical phenomena through international collaborations.

== Awards ==
Caraveo shared the Bruno Rossi Prize of the American Astronomical Society with colleagues in 2007, 2011, and 2012 for work on the Swift, Fermi, and Agile projects.

She was awarded the Italian National Presidential Prize in 2009 for contributions to the understanding of the issue of high energy neutron stars.

In March 2014 she received the "Outstanding Achievement Award" from Women in Aerospace-Europe.

In June 2014 Thomson Reuters included her in the list of "Highly Cited Researchers" in the discipline "Space Science".

In 2016 she was appointment as Commander of the Order of Merit of the Italian Republic (Commendatore OMRI).

She was awarded the Enrico Fermi Award of the Italian Physical Society in 2021 for her research in gamma-ray astronomy and neutron stars.

In 2023 her book Saving the Starry Night (Springer 2021) received the International Academy of Astronautics (IAA) Basic Sciences Book Award.

In 2025, she was elected President of the Italian Astronomical Society (Società Astronomica Italiana).

== Books ==
- Caraveo, P. (2017). Uomini e donne: stessi diritti?. Castelvecchi. ISBN 978-8869449604.
- Caraveo, P. The Violent Universe (Physics Lessons). Vol. 13. Pelago. ISBN 979-1255013945.
- Caraveo, P. (2019). Conquistati dalla Luna: storia di un'attrazione senza tempo. Scienza e idee (Prima edizione ed.). Milano: Raffaello Cortina editore. ISBN 978-88-3285-091-8.
- Caraveo, P.; Bignami, G. (2019). I Marziani siamo noi. ISBN 9788808820358.
- Caraveo, P. (2020). Il cielo è di tutti. Dedalo. ISBN 978-8822016027.
- Caraveo, P. (2021). SIDEREUS NUNCIUS 2.0. Mondadori University. ISBN 9788861848436.
- Caraveo, P. (2021). Saving the starry night: light pollution and its effects on science, culture and nature. Cham, Switzerland: Springer. ISBN 978-3-030-85064-7.
- Caraveo, P. (2023). "Su Marte non ci sono i marziani". Quel che ora sappiamo (in Italian). Il Sole 24 Ore. ISBN 978-8863458077.
- Caraveo, P.; Iacomino, C. (2023). Europe in the global space economy. SpringerBriefs in space development. Cham: Springer. ISBN 978-3-031-36618-5.
- Caraveo, P. (2024). Troppa luce fa male. Dedalo. ISBN 9788822016249.
- Caraveo, Patrizia (October 25, 2024). Ecologia spaziale: Dalla Terra alla Luna a Marte (in Italian). HOEPLI EDITORE. ISBN 978-88-360-1612-9.
- Caraveo, Patrizia (2025). Space ecology: from earth to moon and mars. Cham: Springer International Publishing. ISBN 978-3-031-78343-2.
- Caraveo, P. (2025), "Donne nel sistema solare", Donne fra le stelle, Cham: Springer Nature Switzerland, pp. 73–80, doi:10.1007/978-3-031-83823-1_6
