= Milan school of physics =

School in Milan, Italy

The Milan school of physics refers to the tradition of research in the field of physics in Milan, with particular reference to the first and second halves of the 20th century. During this period, the Institute of Complementary Physics of Milan was formed at the University of Milan, under the impulse of Orso Mario Corbino and Antonio Garbasso, and with the chair of theoretical physics by Aldo Pontremoli.

== History ==
Until the eighteenth century, the teaching of physics in Milan—and more broadly in Italy—developed significantly in the confessional institutes, which represented, to some extent, the secular thought on the one hand and the religious tradition on the other, before following in the twentieth century the events of the university. The first signs of studies, mainly based on astronomy, took place in 1764, when the Brera Astronomical Observatory was founded within the Jesuit College of Milan with the help of La Grange and subsequently of Ruggero Boscovich. It was then with Schiaparelli, a pupil of Quintino Sella and Luigi Menabrea, that the foundations were laid for modern astronomy that made Milan an astronomical center of world excellence.

=== First half of the 20th century (1900–1948) ===
In 1924, the first three absolute chairs of theoretical physics were assigned in Italy: Enrico Fermi, Aldo Pontremoli and Enrico Persico, who were appointed to the three chairs of some of the most prestigious Italian universities. This led Pontremoli himself to be assigned to the Lombard university, where he founded the so-called Institute of Complementary Physics. He directed the institute from 1924 to 1928, with the aim of founding a pole that would respond to the needs of science and technology, such as it suited the greatest Italian industrial center. Having had a part of the school building in via Sacchini available, he took care of the adaptation and the fixed installations so that the new Institute could carry out scientific and didactic activities effectively and without interference. With the means obtained by the university, he constituted the first nucleus of devices essential for the functioning of the new institution; through his relationships in the industrial field, he was able to complete these endowments with materials received as a gift. In this way the Institute in a short time was able to fully fulfill the task assigned to it. In November 1925, the institute was the organizer of the II Assembly of the International Federation of the Intellectual Union. Among the grants received by Pontremoli, the one received from Banca Popolare di Milano in 1926, which allowed the foundation of the radiology laboratory, specialized in ultraviolet radiation, and radioactive substances, should be noted. The foundation of the school, which later became part of the Physics Department of the University of Milan, was published in the physics magazine Il Nuovo Cimento, of the Italian Physics Society. Pontremoli's studies were particularly concerned with optics, radioactivity and hydrodynamics and were mainly published in the Rendiconti dei Lincei of the homonymous Academy and in the Reports of the Lombard Academy of Sciences and Letters. Some popular writings appeared in the magazine La Fiera Letteraria. In 1929, after the death of Aldo Pontremoli—who died in the tragedy of the airship Italia who disappeared in the ice of Antarctica in May of the previous year—Giovanni Polvani replaced him in the chair of Experimental Physics of the Institute which became part of the University of Milan. The Polvani Archive, containing historical volumes, is still kept in the Physics Library of the University of Milan. A classroom in the university department was then named after him. In Milan, Polvani, already before the Second World War, is committed with Bolla and also with Gentile to find new tools to develop research on cosmic rays. Starting from 1936, the physical institute suffered a constant decline due to the conflicts between its protagonists and the fascist regime, many of who left Italy to continue their research studies in the United States of America following the establishment of fascist racial laws.

=== Second half of the 20th century (1949–1998) ===
After the war, the department returned to obtain particular successes thanks to the return of many influential personalities to Italy. In 1949, lectures were given by the Nobel laureate Enrico Fermi, which were then collected by the assistants of the universities of Rome and Milan, and published in 1950 by the Accademia Nazionale dei Lincei. In 1952, Giuseppe Occhialini, who returned to Italy, taught higher physics and founded the Laboratory of Cosmic Physics and Related Technologies of the CNR and the Astrophysics Section of the Physics Department of the University of Milan. Here he created a leading school in the research of cosmic rays with the use of nuclear emulsions exposed at high altitudes, an experience that culminated in 1954 with the G-Stack experiment. He also founded the Space Group, so called because it conducted high altitude observations—first with stratospheric balloons, then with rockets, and finally with artificial satellites. It is also through these activities that Italy and Milan quickly acquired positions of excellence in the field of high-energy astrophysics, and more particularly in x-ray and gamma-ray astronomy. To allow this type of activity, Beppo Occhialini also took action on the organizational level, founding various sections of various research institutes still present, and taking charge of both the theoretical and experimental direction of the department.

==== The Occhialini case ====
Occhialini was involved in two Nobel Prize-winning works: the discovery of the positron and the discovery of the pion. However, as he was an anti-fascist, during the publication of most of his studies he was an exile in England and could not publish in his name alone. Therefore, the articles he wrote were also signed by Patrick Maynard Stuart Blackett in 1932 for the work on the positron and by Cecil Frank Powell in 1947 for the work on the pion. Both of these works were awarded the Nobel Prize, but the awards went to Blackett and Powell. Blackett was honest enough to say that he had nothing to do with it and that Occhialini had done the work. Only many years later was it discovered from the documents of the Nobel Foundation that there had been an explicit veto on the name Occhialini. In fact, Occhialini, since he had not collaborated in the atomic enterprise during the war, could not be awarded the Nobel. Occhialini was then awarded the Wolf Prize for physics in 1979.

Occhialini himself, in the period between 1952 and 1955, supervised Riccardo Giacconi, who would then be awarded the Nobel Prize for physics in 2002 for his pioneering contributions to astrophysics, which led to the discovery of the first cosmic sources in X-rays, and Giovanni Bignami, then president of ASI, INAF, COSPAR and SKA. With the advent of particle accelerators, Occhialini explored new fields of research, including space physics, making a decisive contribution to the foundation of the Italian Space Agency (ASI) and the European Space Agency (ESA), as well as to the INAF-IASF section of Milan. From 1947 to 1961, Polvani was president of the Italian Physics Society, and through this role contributed to the reorganization of Italian research after the war. In 1953, he founded the International School of Physics of Varenna in the municipality of the same name and in the province of Lecco, subsequently named after Enrico Fermi. It was the site of periodic meetings between established scientists and young physicists. Fermi himself, in the summer of 1954, gave a lecture on the physics of π mesons. To date, the school has hosted speeches by over thirty-four Nobel laureates.

==== The cyclotron of Milan ====
After World War II, Italian physicists felt the need to build accelerator machines for the research of particles. After long discussions, two machines were built: one in Frascati—the 1000 Mev synchrotron, intended for high energy physics—and one in Milan—the 45 Mev cyclotron, intended for low energy physics. While the construction of the Frascati machine was financed by the National Institute of Nuclear Physics, the Milan machine was built with local funding from companies and the Municipality of Milan.

The Lombard business world financed basic research activities even without seeing immediate technological progress. A favorable climate had been created for scientific research as a factor of progress; similarly, the industrial world showed interest in the construction of the first Italian technical-scientific museum, the Leonardo da Vinci Museum.

Between 1960 and 1965, the first Italian cyclotron was designed and built at the Institute of Physical Sciences of the University of Milan. It belonged to the category of fixed frequency cyclotrons, variable azimuth field (A.V.F.) and was of the Thomas strong focus type. A special shed and other buildings were built to house the machine and the research laboratories. The machine worked until the early 1980s and was subsequently dismantled when construction of the superconducting cyclotron was started in Segrate. The 1:5 scale model of the cyclotron is kept at the Museum of Science and Technology in Milan. At the time, it was specifically created to study the most suitable and economical shape of the magnets to guarantee the necessary field.

In 1949 Piero Caldirola moved as full professor of theoretical physics at the University of Milan, where he always remained afterwards, as full professor of general physics from 1966 to 1976 and full professor of theoretical physics institutions starting from 1974. From a scientific interest for the problems of the propagation of electromagnetic waves in weakly ionized gases began his involvement in Milan in plasma physics, also becoming president of the Euratom committee for fusion studies at the Frascati Laboratories. In the following years Caldirola, after having created the Italian school of theoretical solid state physics, founded the research group for quantum electronics, and the plasma physics laboratory, as well as the International School of Plasma Physics in Varenna in Milan. He was also director of the Institute of Physics, and of the Postgraduate Schools in "Atomic and Nuclear Physics" and in "Health and Hospital Physics" of the university. In November 1966 Giovanni Polvani, now at the end of his career, was elected Rector of the Milanese university; it's the first time for a physicist. In the 1980s, the group led by Occhialini made numerous progress, collaborating in the design and construction of the first European satellites for astronomy: Cos-B, Exosat, XMM and Beppo-SAX. After 1984, Giuliano Preparata, who had recently returned to Italy after a long period in the United States and a short period in Bari, where he had aroused current controversy among theoretical physicists on cold fusion, was called to the chair of high energy nuclear physics of the University of Milan, where he created, with some young collaborators, his own independent research group with the best students of the department. Here Preparata appears to be the only one who managed to bring a breath of fresh air into what is narrated as the stale world of Italian theoretical physics, giving prestige to the Milanese university. In the same period, Preparata met Emilio Del Giudice in Milan, from which a fruitful friendship and collaboration was born aimed at developing a cold fusion theory, which will give him international fame in the following years. However, the collaboration stopped unexpectedly in 2000 with the premature death of Preparata. The duo was also interested in the properties of electromagnetic fields in water, in a series of experimental works then resumed in 2009 by the Nobel Prize for Medicine Luc Montagnier. Between 1982 and 1991 Ugo Amaldi received a professorship at the University of Milan. Here for a decade he headed an international collaboration of over 400 scientists who designed and implemented the DELPHI experiment at the LEP accelerator at CERN. In this same period Fabiola Gianotti studied at the Milanese university, before becoming director of the ATLAS experiment, and then general director of CERN in Geneva. Meanwhile, Giovanni Bignami, after twenty years of work, managed to identify and understand Geminga, the first neutron star without radio emission. The American Astronomical Society in 1993 awarded him the Bruno Rossi Award for this discovery, alongside Jules Halpern.

=== Present (1998–present) ===
In the 2000s the first National Center for Oncological Hadrotherapy was created in Italy under the activity of Ugo Amaldi, with it being the fourth of its kind in the world. It houses a synchrotron of 25 meters in diameter that is capable of accelerating both protons and ions of carbon. In 1995, Marco Bersanelli, who returned to Italy from the Lawrence Berkley National Laboratory after having studied and collaborated with Nobel laureate George Smoot, created an observational cosmology group for the study of the cosmic microwave background at the University of Milan, which became one of the main executive and scientific managers of the space missions of the ESA's Planck (launched in 2009) and of the Euclid space telescope (launched in 2023). In the same period, Giuseppe Bertin won a chair at the University of Milan, where he focuses on studies on the growth dynamics of galaxies. This earned him the "National Prize of the President of the Republic" of the Accademia dei Lincei. He is the third professor of the physics department of the University of Milan to receive this prize, after Giuseppe Occhialini (in 1949) and Piero Caldirola (in 1956).

== Exponents ==
- Aldo Pontremoli
- Giovanni Schiaparelli
- Giuseppe Occhialini
- Giovanni Polvani
- Riccardo Giacconi
- Piero Caldirola
- Giovanni Bignami
- Patrizia Caraveo
- Marco Bersanelli
- Ugo Amaldi
- Giuliano Preparata
- Emilio Del Giudice
- Emilio Gatti
- Fabiola Gianotti
- Giuseppe Bertin
- Lucio Rossi
- Alessio Zaccone

== Bibliography ==
- Il nuovo cimento, organo della società italiana di fisica, anno VII-1930; Zanichelli (Bologna).
- Giuseppe Occhialini. Biografia di un fisico italiano, Gruppo Editoriale Muzzio (2009) ISBN 978-88-96159-02-6.
- Giordana G.P. - VITA DI ALDO PONTREMOLI, ASIN B00KPD0R4G; Editore : Formiggini (1 gennaio 1933).

== See also ==
- University of Milan
