= PKS 0420−014 =

Blazar in the constellation Eridanus

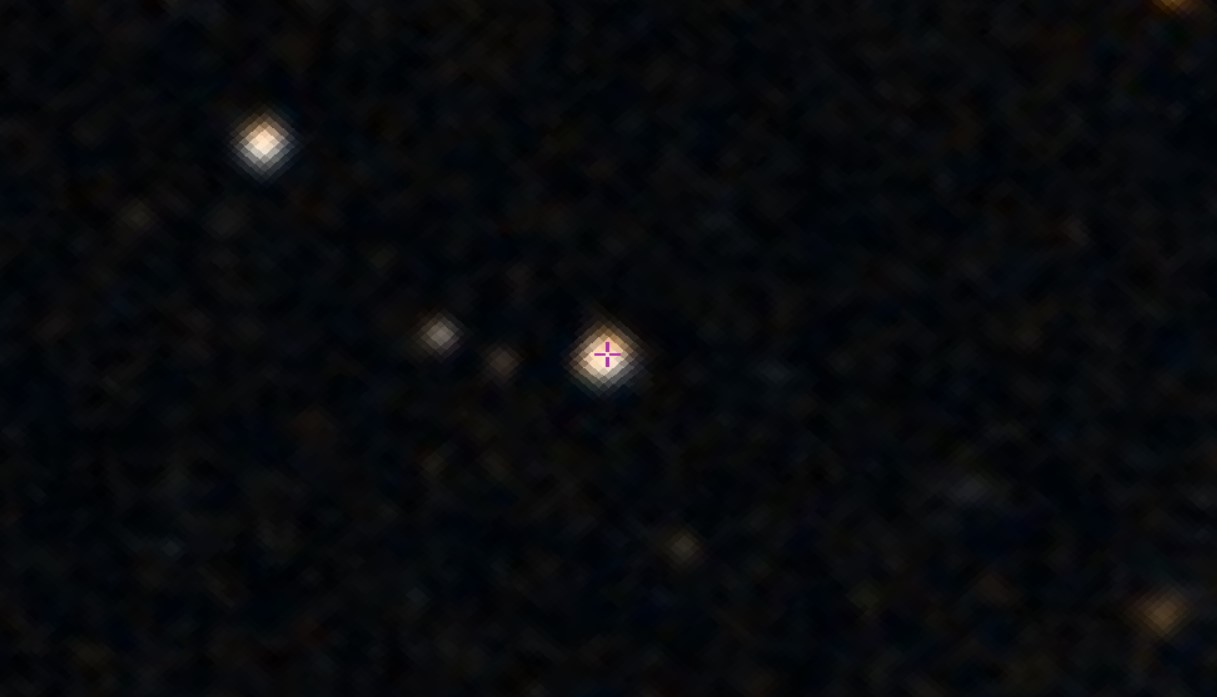
- The blazar PKS 0420−014

Observation data (J2000.0 epoch)
- Constellation: Eridanus
- Right ascension: 04^{h} 23^{m} 15.800^{s}
- Declination: −01° 20′ 33.066″
- Redshift: 0.916090
- Heliocentric radial velocity: 264,637 km/s
- Distance: 7.437 Gly
- Apparent magnitude (V): 17.0
- Apparent magnitude (B): 17.5

Characteristics
- Type: Blazar, BL Lac, HPQ

Other designations
- FASTT 159, LEDA 75147, 4FGL J0423.3−0120, OA 129, IRAS 04207−0127, QSO B0420−014, INTREF 181, PKS 0420−01

PKS 0420−014 is a blazar located in the constellation of Eridanus. This is a high polarized quasar with a redshift of (z) 0.915, first discovered as an astronomical radio source by astronomers in 1975. The radio spectrum of this source appears to be flat, making it a flat-spectrum radio quasar (FRSQ).

== Description ==
PKS 0420−014 is found to be violently variable on the electromagnetic spectrum from long-centimeter to short-millimeter wavelengths. It is a source of gamma ray activity, showing a flux of (E>100 MeV) of (0.8±0.2)×10^{−6} photons cm s^{−2} at the time of its high state, when observed by the Large Area Telescope in January 2010.

Additionally, optical flares not associated with gamma ray activity were observed in PKS 0420−014. In 1979 a flare displayed a magnitude increase of 1.3 in 5 days, which was followed by a decreasing magnitude of 1.7 in 23 days. Its flare recorded between February and March 1992, was the highest observed optical state observed during the period EGRET recorded the highest gamma ray flux density. Subsequent flares were detected in July 2012 and in October 2020, when it reached a magnitude of 15.25 on both days, after a state of quiescence.

The source of PKS 0420−014 at milliarcsecond (mas) resolutions shows a symmetrical and unresolved core. This is interpreted as the case of either the jet being aligned near the line of sight or a "naked" core. At lambda observations at 7 millimeters, the source is resolved into a core and a bent jet while at kiloparsec scales, it shows a structure extending directly south out by 25" with a weak secondary component located northeast of the core.

The jet of PKS 0420−014 is strongly dominated by a radio core in parsec-scales, indicating the presence of a multicomponent substructure in its core. There are two moving components in the jet's innermost part, with one of them located near the core exhibiting a slower motion and accelerating beyond 0.2 mas as soon its trajectory switches from -100° to -175°. A bright outer component located from the core, is also shown to move ballistically along -72° at a similar speed to the inner component. There are also five other jet components displaying superluminal motion at β_{app} ~ 2-14c, with all of them following a common curved path within the jet.

It is suggested that the source for the flux density variations in PKS 0420−014 is the presence of a binary supermassive black hole system with masses of about 7 × 10^{7} M_{☉} and 2.1 × 10^{8} M_{☉} which have a rotation period of 150 years. The gravitational influence of this binary system likely causes the precession of its accretion disk as well as the ejection of plasma from the black hole. As the accretion disk is precessed, the magnetic field lines and relativistic beaming are both perturbed.
