= Steven Boggs =

American astrophysicist

- Born: 1969 or 1970 (age 56–57)
- Education: University of California, Berkeley (Ph.D.)
- Scientific career
- Fields: Astrophysics
- Workplaces: University of California, Berkeley; University of California, San Diego

Steven Edward Boggs is an American astrophysicist. He is the dean of the division of physical sciences at University of California, San Diego.

== Education ==
Boggs completed a Ph.D. at University of California, Berkeley (UCB) in 1998.

== Career ==
Boggs was the chair of the UCB physics department from 2013 to 2016. In 2016, after 16 years on the faculty at UCB, he became the dean of the division of physical sciences at University of California, San Diego (UCSD).

At UCB, Boggs researched supernovas. At UCSD, he develops and flies gamma-ray telescopes for use in space. He measures radioactive nuclei in the inner region of supernova explosions. Boggs studies emissions from gamma rays on the surface of neutron stars by developing sensitive gamma ray instruments including telescopes for satellite and balloon missions.
