= PSR B0355+54 =

Isolated radio pulsar in the constellation Camelopardalis

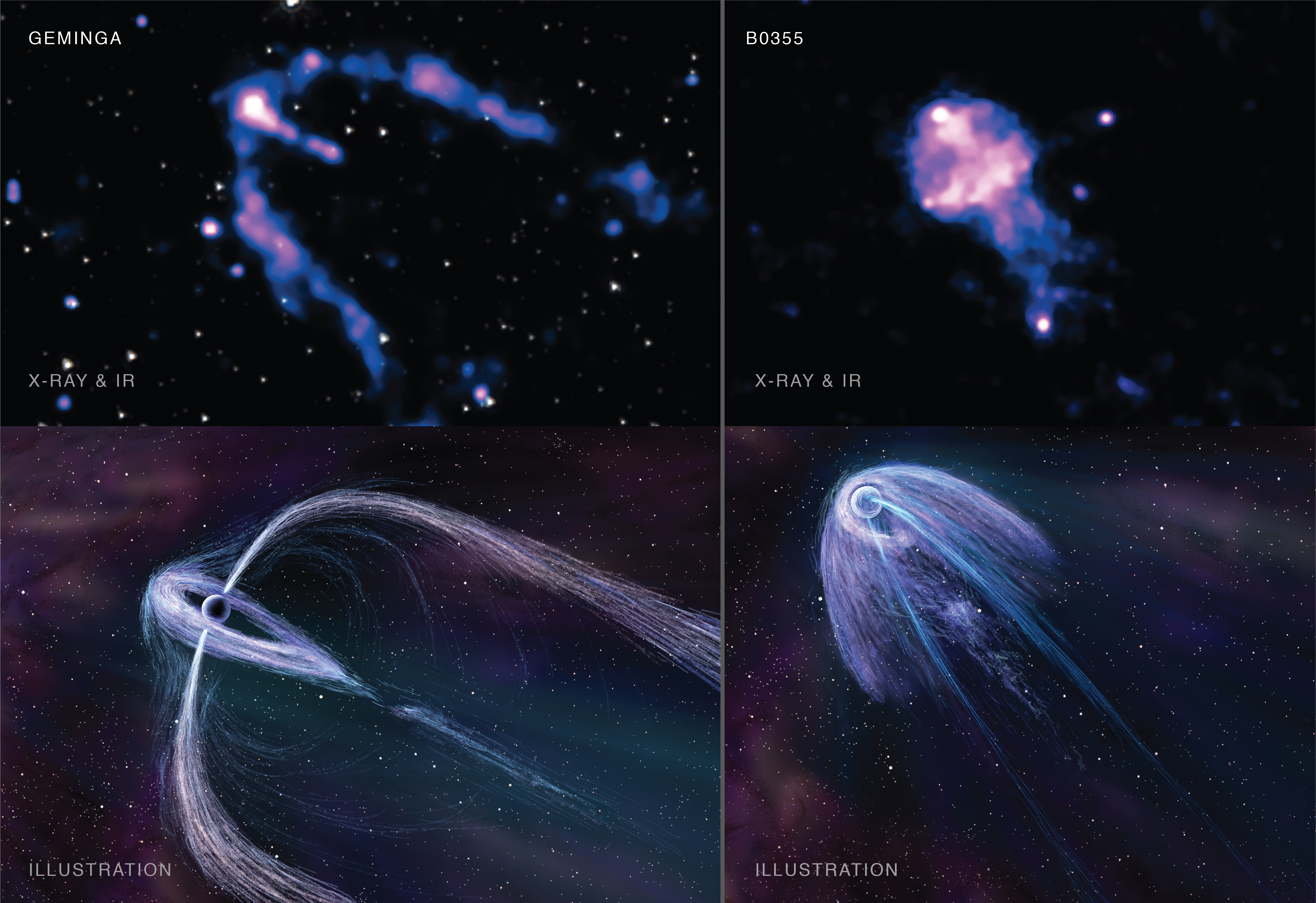
- Image depicting pulsar wind nebula of PSR B0355+54 and Geminga

Observation data Epoch J2000 Equinox ICRS
- Constellation: Camelopardalis
- Right ascension: 03^{h} 58^{m} 53.72^{s}
- Declination: +54° 13′ 13.7″

Characteristics
- Spectral type: Pulsar

Astrometry
Parallax (π)	0.91±0.16 mas
Distance	approx. 3,600 ly (approx. 1,100 pc)

Details
Rotation	0.156384121559 s
Age	564,000 years

Other designations
- PSR J0355+54, GAL 148.2+00.8

Database references
SIMBAD	data

PSR B0355+54 (also known as PSR J0358+5413) is a radio pulsar located in the constellation of Camelopardalis. It is a middle-aged, isolated neutron star with a characteristic age of approximately 564,000 years and a spin period of 0.1563 seconds. The pulsar is notable for its extended pulsar wind nebula (PWN), which exhibits a comet-like morphology due to the pulsar's supersonic motion through the interstellar medium. Discovered in 1982 during the second Cambridge pulsar survey, it has been extensively studied in radio, X-ray, and other wavelengths to understand pulsar energetics, particle acceleration, and nebula dynamics.

== Discovery ==
PSR B0355+54 was discovered in 1982 as part of the second Cambridge pulsar survey conducted at 81.5 MHz using the Cambridge Low-Frequency Synthesis Telescope. Initial observations confirmed its period and dispersion measure, establishing it as a radio pulsar at a distance of approximately 1 kpc. Subsequent high-resolution studies refined its parameters, including proper motion and parallax measurements from very long baseline interferometry.

== Pulsar wind nebula ==
The PWN of PSR B0355+54 is one of the best-studied examples of a bow-shock nebula, often described as resembling a "space jellyfish". Deep Chandra X-ray Observatory observations (totaling 395 ks) reveal a compact head (~5 arcseconds) and an extended tail up to 10 arcminutes long (~2 pc at the pulsar's distance). The tail shows minimal spectral cooling, suggesting either low magnetic fields with fast flow or ongoing particle reacceleration. X-ray efficiency is low (~1% of Ė in the 2–10 keV band), and faint orthogonal extensions to the proper motion direction have been noted.

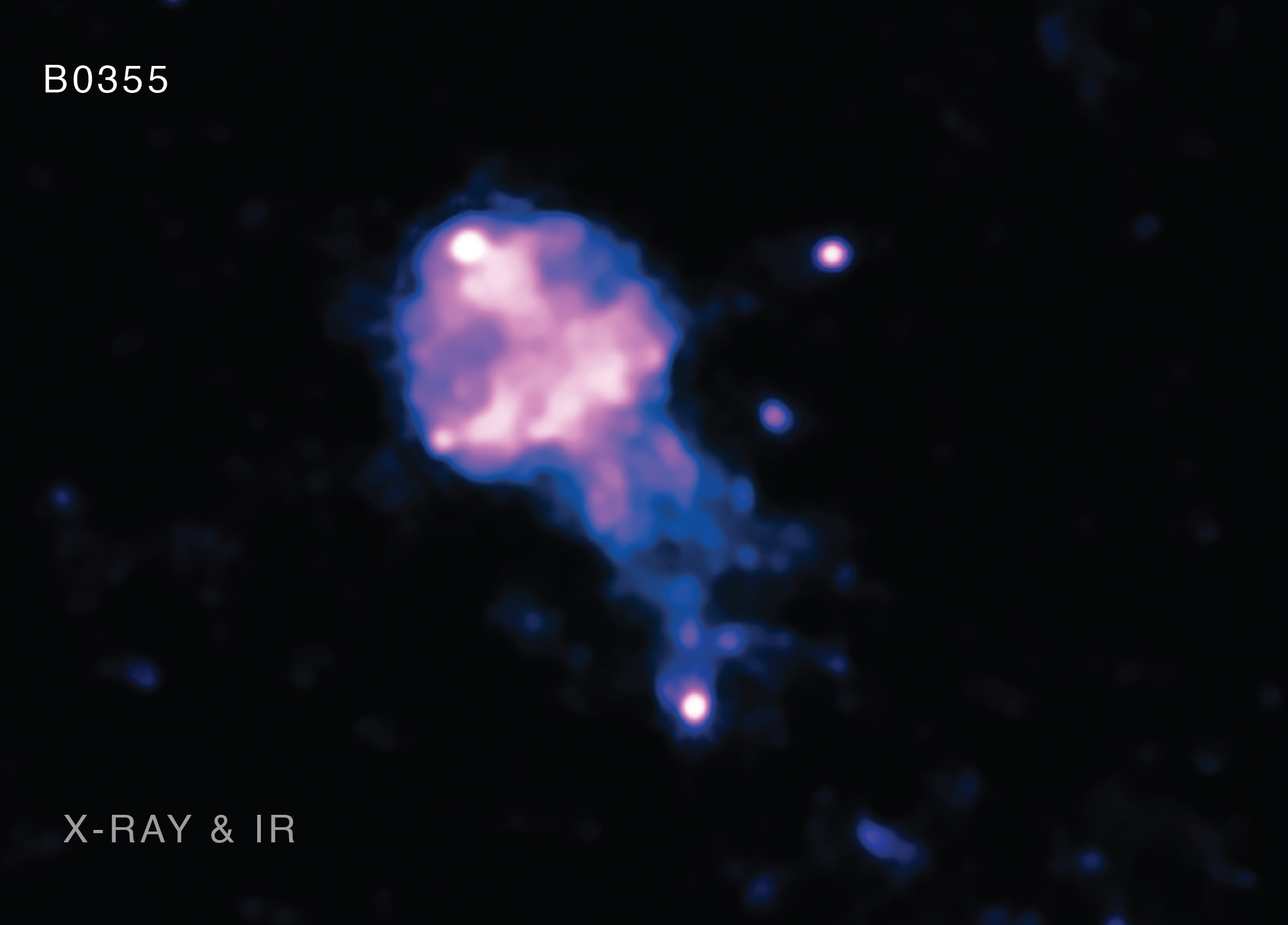
Pulsar wind nebula of PSR B0355+54

The nebula's morphology indicates a small angle between the spin axis and line of sight, similar to the pulsar Geminga. No termination shock is evident, and comparisons with other PWNs like those of PSR J0357+3205 highlight shared dynamics in supersonic pulsar motion.

== Emission ==
=== Radio ===
Radio observations at frequencies like 2.25 GHz and 8.6 GHz have probed interstellar scintillation, revealing diffractive and refractive effects in the turbulent medium. Recent studies (2023–2024) using telescopes like FAST have analyzed profile variations over narrow frequency ranges around 1250 MHz, confirming stable flux densities. The pulsar is often used as a calibrator in observations of fast radio bursts and millisecond pulsars.

=== X-ray ===
X-ray emission, detected by Chandra and XMM-Newton, includes thermal components from the neutron star surface (~106 K) and non-thermal magnetospheric emission. Pulsed X-rays match the radio period, with a hard spectrum (photon index Γ ≈ 1.4) in the compact nebula.

=== Other ===
No pulsed gamma-ray emission has been detected, despite the pulsar's age and spin-down energy making it a potential candidate for Fermi-LAT observations. Searches for TeV gamma-rays from the nebula using VERITAS have yielded upper limits.
