= PKS 2255−282 =

Blazar in the constellation Piscis Austrinus

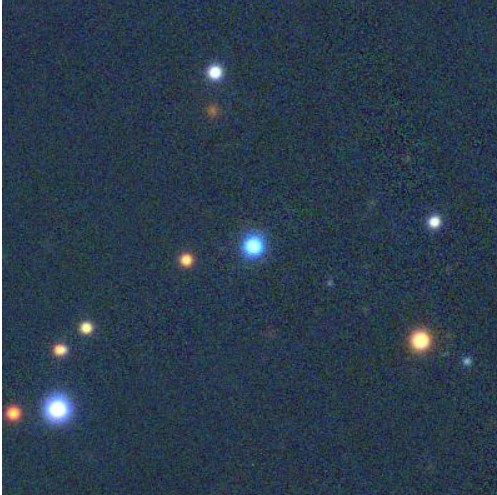
- The blazar PKS 2255−282

Observation data (J2000.0 epoch)
- Constellation: Piscis Austrinus
- Right ascension: 22^{h} 58^{m} 05.9629^{s}
- Declination: −27° 58′ 21.257″
- Redshift: 0.925840
- Heliocentric radial velocity: 277,560 km/s
- Distance: 7.552 Gly
- Apparent magnitude (V): 16.77
- Apparent magnitude (B): 17.34

Characteristics
- Type: Opt. var, LPQ, FSRQ
- Notable features: Gamma ray emitting blazar

Other designations
- LEDA 2831543, WMAP 12, 4FGL J2258.1−2759, 1Jy 2255−282, TXS 2255−282, PMN J2258−2758

PKS 2255−282 is a blazar located in the constellation of Piscis Austrinus. This is a low-polarized quasar at the redshift of 0.926, first discovered in 1975 by astronomers via a spectroscopic observation. The radio spectrum of this source appears as flat, making it as a flat-spectrum quasar but also a Gigahertz Peaked Spectrum source (GPS) with turnover frequency between 22 and 37 GHz.

== Description ==
PKS 2255−282 is found variable on the electromagnetic spectrum. It is a source of gamma ray activity. Furthermore, it underwent a powerful millimeter wave outburst detected in 1997. During April 1997, its 90 GHz flux density exceeded 8 Jansky (Jy), which was twice the value compared to the prior observation 11 months prior to the outburst. At the end June 1997, the 90 GHz flux reached 10.1 Jy making PKS 2255−282 one of the fewer sources with high detections above 10 Jy.

In December 1997, PKS 2255−282 showed a gamma ray flare which lasted for a period of 2 weeks. During the observations, it remained in a bright state with a total measured flux of (1.6 ± 0.3) × 10^{−6} cm^{−2} s^{−1} and a peak flux of (4.8 ± 1.1) × 10^{−6} cm^{−2} s^{−1}, making this value higher by factor of 20, than the upper limits of its quiescent state. A gamma ray outburst was observed by the Energetic Gamma Ray Experiment Telescope mounted abroad the Compton Gamma Ray Observatory in January 1998. In September 2012, a near-infrared ray was shown to be brightening.

The radio structure in PKS 2255−282 is complex. A 5 GHz radio image of the object made via Very Long Baseline Array, shows a strong bright core component marginally resolved at 2.8 Jy and a short jet extending southwest by 5 mas. However, when shown at higher frequencies, the jet is completely omitted from radio imaging with the core only present at 4.2 and 2.7 Jy. This core is estimated to have a size of 0.2 mas with extended emission in both south and east directions.

A quasi-periodic oscillation was detected in PKS 2255−282 in October 2024 with a period of 97 days. This is possibly explained by a binary black hole system which a model shows a secondary black hole orbiting round the primary black hole before passing through an accretion disk. Quasi-periodic signals have also been detected in this object with three high states showed during 2009–2013, 2017-2021 and in 2023.
