= PKS 1622−297 =

Blazar in the constellation of Scorpius

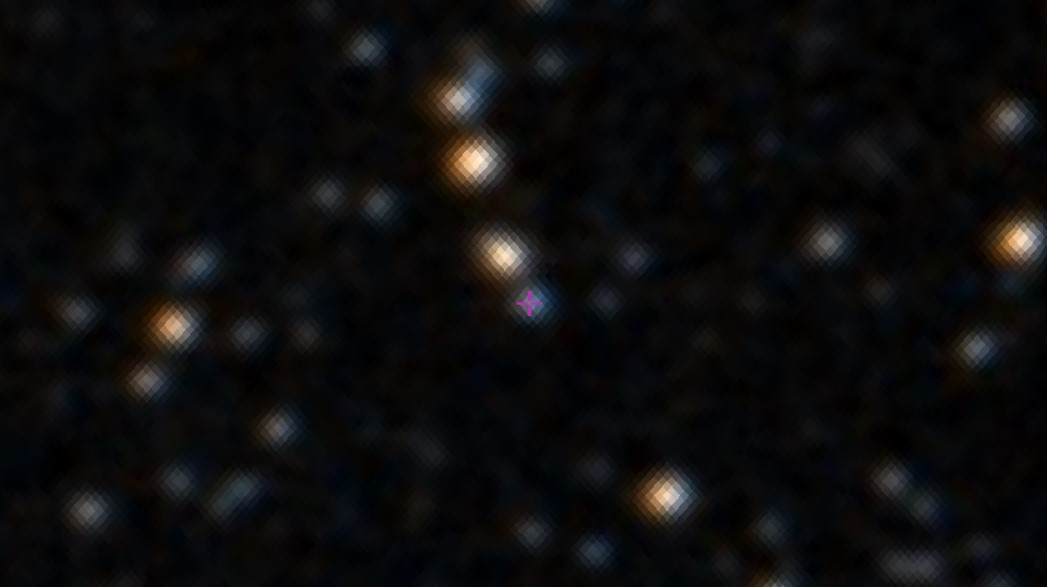
- The blazar PKS 1622−297

Observation data (J2000.0 epoch)
- Constellation: Scorpius
- Right ascension: 16^{h} 26^{m} 06.020^{s}
- Declination: −29° 51′ 26.971″
- Redshift: 0.813800
- Heliocentric radial velocity: 243,971 km/s
- Distance: 6.885 Gly
- Apparent magnitude (V): 20.5
- Apparent magnitude (B): 18.41

Characteristics
- Type: Blazar, LPQ, FRSQ
- Notable features: Gamma ray emitting blazar

Other designations
- LEDA 2828823, 4FGL J1626.0−2950, QSO B1622−297, Cul 1622−297, 2CXO J162606.0−295126, PKS B1622−297

PKS 1622−297 is a blazar located in the constellation of Scorpius. It is one of the brightest objects of its type in the gamma ray region. It has a redshift of (z) 0.815. This blazar was first discovered as a compact astronomical radio source in 1970 by astronomers who were conducting interferometer observations and identified with an optical counterpart in 1984. In addition, the radio spectrum of the source appears flat, making it a flat-spectrum radio quasar (FRSQ).

== Description ==
PKS 1622−297 produced a powerful gamma ray outburst in June and July 1995. This was detected by Energetic Gamma Ray Experiment Telescope (EGRET) in the year 1995, where its outburst in the energy range above 100 MeV lasted for a period of five weeks. However no presence of MeV emission was detected. A major flare in PKS 1622−297 was observed by EGRET, and lasted around two days. Subsequent optical observations in 1996 and 1997 as well as three nights in 2001, showed the source is much fainter. Two other flares were detected in March 2010 and July 2014.

A three-week radio, optical and X-ray campaign was conducted on PKS 1622−297 by the Rossi X-ray Timing Explorer as well as the University of Michigan Radio Astronomy Observatory and optical telescopes at Cerro Tololo Inter-American Observatory in Chile. Results indicated the object was a weak X-ray emitter and was also redder during its bright optical flux state.

Radio images made of the object via Very Long Baseline Interferometry observations showed the source having an elongated structure towards the west on parsec scales. Three components are found in a form of a bright core and two weak jet components showing superluminal motion reaching up to 12.1 h^{−1} c. There is a jet along the position angle of 69°, made up of a prominent component 15 mas from the core with a diffused structure extending out to 30 mas. However a VLBI Space Observatory Programme (VSOP) image shows it having a weak component and a strong core. In an Australia Telescope Compact Array (ATCA) imaging at 4.8 GHz, the source has a bright core with strong extended emission in form of two components. These components are placed in equal angular distances on sides of the core and of similar brightness and sizes.

The supermassive black hole in PKS 1622−297 is estimated to be 8 × 10^{8} M_{☉} with the limit of the Schwarzschild radius being Rg > 2.5 × 10^{14} centimeters.
