= Marco Bersanelli =

Italian astrophysicist and academic

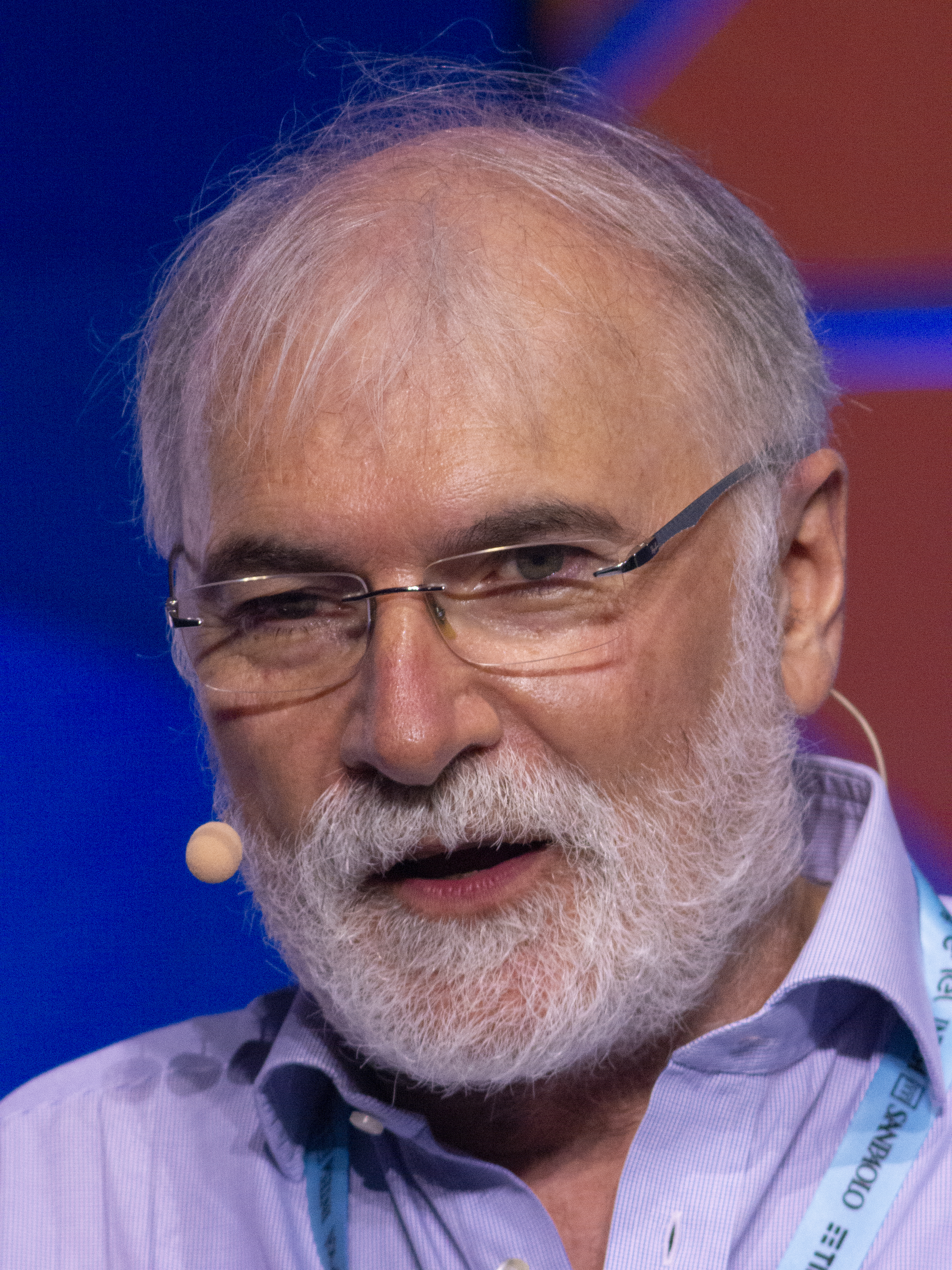
- Bersanelli at the 2021 Rimini Meeting
- Born: 29 January 1960 (age 66); Milan, Italy
- Education: University of Milan
- Scientific career
- Fields: Physics
- Workplaces: UC Berkeley; University of Milan

Marco Rinaldo Fedele Bersanelli (born 29 January 1960) is an Italian astrophysicist and academic, professor of astronomy at the University of Milan.

== Biography ==
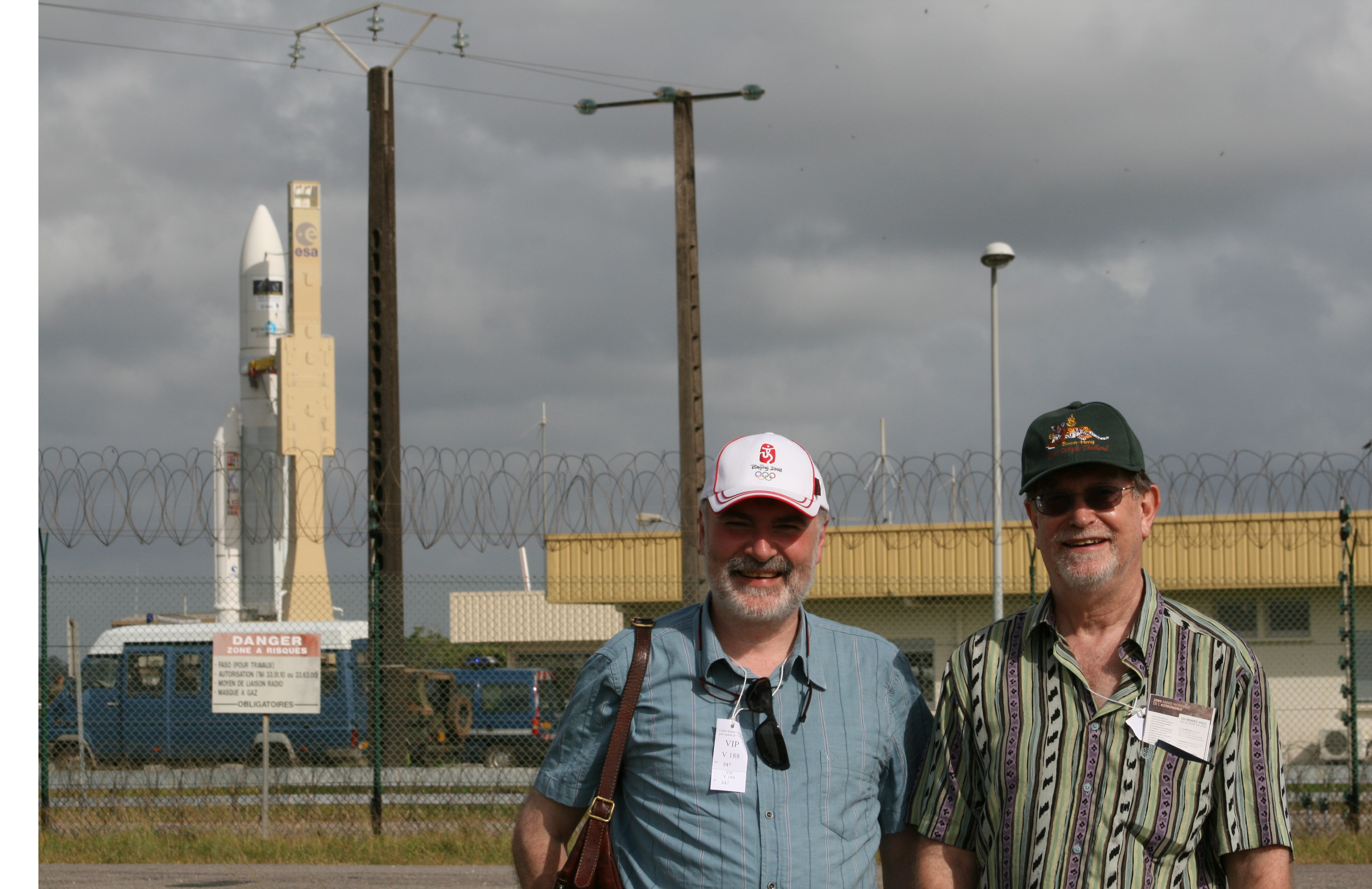
Bersanelli and George Smoot were on hand to watch the launch of the Planck mission from the ESA’s Guiana Space Centre. Bersanelli and Smoot proposed one of the satellites that evolved into Planck.

In 1986 he graduated in physics at the University of Milan with professor Giorgio Sironi as supervisor. Later he was Visiting Scholar at the Lawrence Berkeley National Laboratory, University of California, Berkeley until 1990 and then Visiting Researcher until 1995. During this period he collaborated with future Nobel laureate George Smoot. Here Marco has been one of the members of the COBRAS/SAMBA Phase A study team, which has been renamed Max Planck Surveyor mission after it has been chosen as a flight project by ESA.

He continues to be a researcher at the Institute of Cosmic Physics and Relative Technologies (IFCTR), CNR, Milan, to later become Senior Researcher. In 2000 he was ordained associate professor of Experimental Physics, Department of Physics, University of Milan, of which he became full professor in 2006, directing the observational cosmology group of the department.

== Research ==
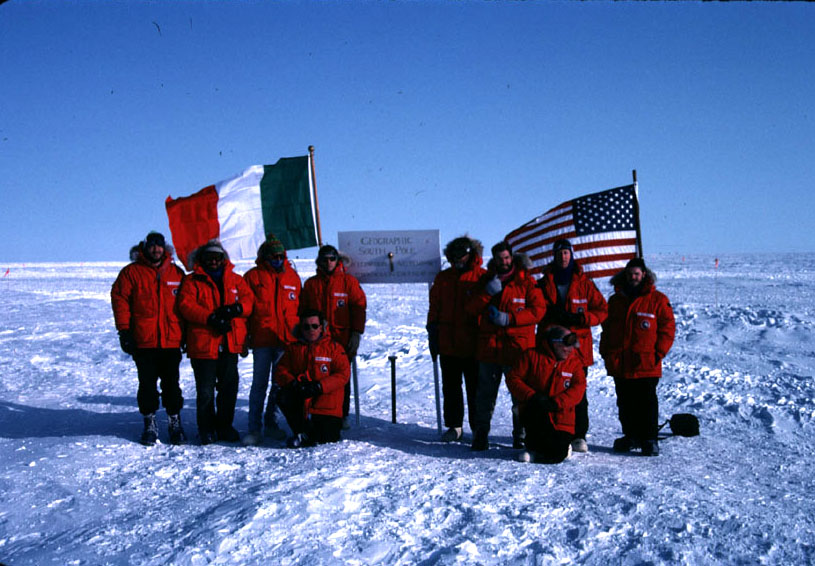
Smoot's group expedition to Antarctica

Bersanelli is a collaborator at IASF, National Institute of Astrophysics. He deals with observational cosmology, in particular with the observation of the early universe through the Cosmic Microwave Background. He has participated in two scientific expeditions to the South Pole and collaborates with the European Space Agency. He is one of the main scientific leaders of ESA's Planck space mission, launched in 2009, whose results made it possible to estimate the main cosmological parameters with unprecedented precision. He is Deputy PI and Planck-LFI's Instrument Scientist, one of the two instruments aboard the satellite. In the period 2018-2020 the team of researchers he leads played a fundamental role in the EU-funded project, BeyondPlanck, aimed at developing a new analysis system of the CMB, then successfully applied to the Planck-LFI data.

He has participated in numerous technical-scientific evaluation committees at the largest world agencies active in the space sector: ASI; NASA; Agence Nationale de la Recherche, JSPS, CONICYT, often taking on key roles in hiring highly skilled personnel in many European countries, as well as the United States and Japan. He was a member of the European Research Council.

== Publications ==
Bersanelli has authored over 400 articles, more than 300 of which published in the main journals specialized in the field of astrophysics and cosmology, with an h-index over 96; and over 54500 citations. M.B. he is the author of numerous Conference Proceedings and Technical Notes, some of which were fundamental for the development of the hardware for the Planck mission. M. B. he has been referee for numerous international journals. Since 2013 he has been a member of the editorial board of Journal of Instrumentation (JINST).

== Books ==
- Die Planck mission: Vorstoss in neue dimensionen der beobachtenden Kosmologie, J. Tauber, M. Bersanelli, J. M. Lamarre, Sterne und Weltraum, pp. 39–55, February 2008
- From Galileo to Gell-Mann: The Wonder That Inspired the Greatest Scientists of All Time: In Their Own Words, Marco Bersanelli Mario Gargantini, Templeton Press, 2009
- La Aventura del Discubrimiento, G. Ruiz, A. Fernandez-Ranada, C. Tsallis, M. Bersanelli, Encuentro, Madrid 2009
- Infinity and the Nostalgia of the Stars in Infinity, New Research Frontiers”, Ed. Michał Heller & W. High Woodin, Cambridge University Press, 2011
- Light in the Beginning, M. Bersanelli, in: “Light from light”, Gerald O'Collins, S. J., and Mary Ann Meyers Ed., Cambridge: Wm. B. Eerdmans Publishing Co., pp. 80–101, 2011

== Awards ==
- NATO Advanced Grant, 1990;
- NSF Medal for Research in Antarctica, 1991;
- ASI Award for contribution to Planck, 2010;
- ESA Award for achievements in Planck (to Planck Collaboration), 2010;
- Istituto Lombardo Accademia di Scienze e Lettere, 2012;
- NERSC Award for High Impact Scientific Achievement (to Planck Collaboration), 2014;
- Gruber Prize for Cosmology (with Planck Team and PI's), 2018;
- Grossmann Prize (with Planck Team), 2018;
- European Physical Society, Giuseppe and Vanna Cocconi Prize (with Planck and WMAP Teams), 2019.
