= Giovanni Bignami =

Italian physicist (1944–2017)

Giovanni Bignami OMRI
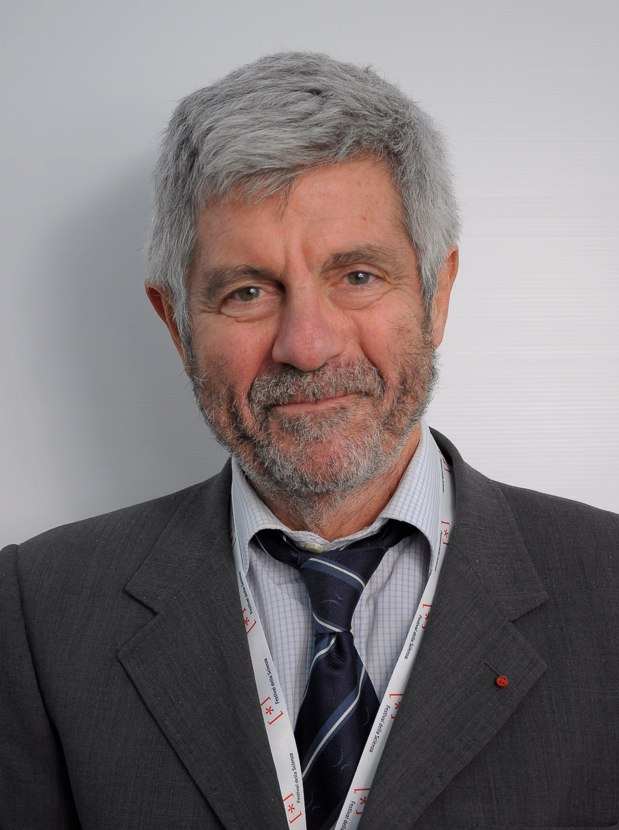
- Giovanni Bignami at the 2011 Festival della Scienza in Genoa.
- Born: 4 October 1944; Desio, Kingdom of Italy
- Died: 24 May 2017 (aged 72); Madrid, Spain
- Other name: Nanni Bignami
- Education: University of Milan
- Occupation: Astrophysicist
- Organizations: European Space Agency; Italian Space Agency; Committee on Space Research; Accademia dei Lincei
- Known for: Discovery of Geminga
- Spouse: Patrizia Caraveo (m. 1991)
- Awards: Bruno Rossi Prize; Blaise Pascal Medal for Astrophysics; Von Karman Award; Légion d'Honneur; Ordre national du Mérite; Order of Merit of the Italian Republic
- Scientific career
- Workplaces: IUSS Pavia; National Institute for Astrophysics

Giovanni Fabrizio "Nanni" Bignami (Italian pronunciation: [dʒoˈvanni faˈbrittsjo biɲˈɲaːmi]; 10 April 1944 – 24 May 2017) was an Italian astrophysicist, best known for his discovery of the neutron star Geminga. From March 2007 until August 2008, he was Chairman of the Italian Space Agency. Between 2010 and 2014, he was the first Italian to chair the Committee on Space Research (COSPAR), and from 2011 until 2015, he was President of INAF. He was also the chairman of the SKA project. He was married to fellow Italian astrophysicist Patrizia Caraveo. The asteroid 6852 Nannibignami was named in his honour.

== Career ==
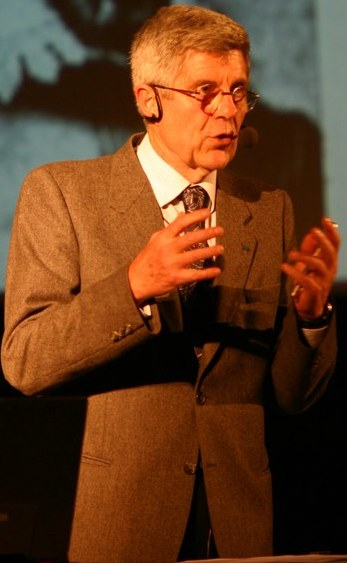
Bignami in 2004

Bignami graduated from the University of Milan in 1968 with a degree in physics. From 1988 to 1997, he was the Principal Investigator for the European Space Agency's XMM-Newton mission, and was a professor of astronomy and astrophysics at the IUSS in Pavia. He is most known for his discovery of the neutron star Geminga. From 2004 to 2007, he was President of the Space Science Advisory Committee (SSAC) of the European Space Agency, and from 2007 to 2008, he was Chairman of the Italian Space Agency. In 2010, he was elected President of the Committee on Space Research (COSPAR), the first Italian to hold this post. He served until 2014. From 2011 until 2015, Bignami served as president of INAF.

Bignami stood as a Democratic Party candidate for Lombardy, Piedmont, Aosta Valley and Liguria in the 2009 European Parliament election. His campaign slogan was Più ricerca in Italia, più futuro in Europa ("More research in Italy, more future in Europe"); he was not elected.

Bignami received several honours, including the Bruno Rossi Prize from the American Astronomical Society, the Blaise Pascal Medal for Astrophysics from the European Academy of Sciences and the Von Karman Award from the International Academy of Astronautics. He was named Officier of the Légion d'Honneur and the Ordre national du Mérite in France, and was a member of the Accademia dei Lincei and of the French Academy of Sciences. He was named Officer of the Order of Merit of the Italian Republic in 2016.

Bignami was also a science communicator, writing for Corriere della Sera, La Repubblica, Il Sole 24 Ore, L'Espresso and Panorama, as well as appearing regularly on the TV programme Superquark as the curator of a segment about astronomy.

Bignami died on 24 May 2017 in Madrid, Spain, struck by a sudden illness.

== Works ==
- (it) La storia nello spazio, Milan, Mursia, 2001, ISBN 88-425-2939-7.
- (it) L'esplorazione dello spazio. Alla scoperta del sistema solare, Bologna, Il Mulino, 2006, ISBN 88-15-11404-1.
- (it) I marziani siamo noi. Un filo rosso dal Big Bang alla vita, Bologna, Zanichelli, 2010, ISBN 978-88-08-26156-4. Translated into English as We are the Martians, Springer, Berlin, 2012
- (it) Cosa resta da scoprire, Milano, Mondadori, 2011, ISBN 978-88-04-61364-0. Ristampato nel 2012 nella serie bestseller “Oscar”. Translated into English as Imminent Science, Springer, 2014
- (it) G. Bignami-Cristina Bellon, Il futuro spiegato ai ragazzi, Milano, Mondadori, 2012, ISBN 978-88-04-61681-8.
- (it) Il mistero delle sette sfere. Cosa resta da esplorare. Dalla depressione di Afar alle stelle più vicine, Milano, Mondadori, 2013, ISBN 978-88-04-63068-5. Translated into English as The Mystery of the Seven Spheres, Springer, 2015
- A Scenario for Interstellar Exploration and Its Financing, Heidelberg, Springer Verlag, 2013, ISBN 88-47-05336-6.
- (it) G. Bignami-Andrea Sommariva, Oro dagli asteroidi e asparagi da Marte. Realtà e miti dell'esplorazione dello spazio, Milan, Mondadori University, 2015, ISBN 978-88-6184-418-6.
- G. Bignami-Andrea Sommariva, The Future of Human Space Exploration, Macmillan, 2016.

== See also ==
- Milan school of physics
