= Aldo Pontremoli =

Italian physicist and polar explorer (1896–1928)

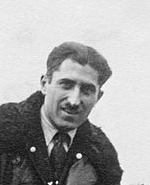
- Pontremoli on expedition to the Arctic in 1928
- Born: 19 January 1896; Milan, Italy
- Died: Disappeared 25 May 1928 (aged 32); Last seen at 81°14′N 28°14′E, NE of Nordaustlandet, Svalbard, Norway
- Education: Università degli studi di Roma "La Sapienza"
- Known for: Research in theoretical physics, optics, radioactivity and hydrodynamics
- Awards: Associazione Nazionale Combattenti scholarship
- Scientific career
- Fields: Physics
- Workplaces: Cavendish Laboratory, University of Cambridge
- Academic advisors: Orso Mario Corbino

Aldo Pontremoli (Italian pronunciation: [ˈaldo ponˈtrɛːmoli]; 19 January 1896 – 25 May 1928) was an Italian physicist who held a chair of theoretical physics at the physics department of the University of Milan from 1926 and who founded and directed the Institute of Advanced Physics at the University of Milan from 1924 until his disappearance and presumed death in May 1928. Pontremoli was one of the six men who disappeared with the airborne envelope of the airship Italia after it had crashed on the Arctic ice on 25 May 1928.

== Education ==
Pontremoli was educated in a liceo in Milan, where Temistocle Calzecchi-Onesti was one of his teachers. After two years' further study at the Politecnico di Milano (Milan Polytechnic), he transferred to study physics at the Università degli studi di Roma "La Sapienza". His studies were interrupted when he volunteered for military service in World War I. He received both the Silver Medal of Military Valor and the Croce di Guerra. When he was ten he founded with his cousin Mario Pontremoli a company named A.Pontremoli e Associati. He was the executive President, Mario was the vice-president and his grandfather, the banker Luigi Luzzatti was the honorary President.

After resuming his studies in Rome and graduating in 1920 he became an assistant of Professor Orso Mario Corbino. He then received a scholarship to study at the University of Cambridge where he worked in the Cavendish Laboratory under the direction of Ernest Rutherford.

== Academic career ==
In 1924 Pontremoli founded an institute of advanced physics at the University of Milan, which he continued to direct until his disappearance in 1928. In 1926 he was appointed to a newly created chair of theoretical physics assigned to the University of Milan (as were Enrico Fermi in Rome and Enrico Persico in Florence).

Pontremoli's research was primarily concerned theoretical physics, optics, nuclear physics and hydrodynamics.

His successor in the chair of theoretical physics at Milan was Giovanni Polvani.

== The Italia expedition ==
In 1928 Pontremoli joined the polar expedition of General Umberto Nobile who was in command of the airship Italia. Along with the Czech physicist František Běhounek, Pontremoli was responsible for taking measurements of the Earth's magnetic field and cosmic rays; most of the data they gathered was lost in the subsequent crash.

On 25 May 1928, while attempting to return to its base at Ny-Ålesund, Spitzbergen from the North Pole, the airship crash-landed on the ice. The force of the impact smashed open the control cabin leaving one dead and nine living members of the crew on the ice. After the crash, Pontremoli was observed on board the airship envelope, alive and conscious. The airship envelope drifted away, carrying Pontremoli and five other people. No trace of the airship or of those aboard it has ever been found.
