= Geminga =

X-ray pulsar in the constellation Gemini

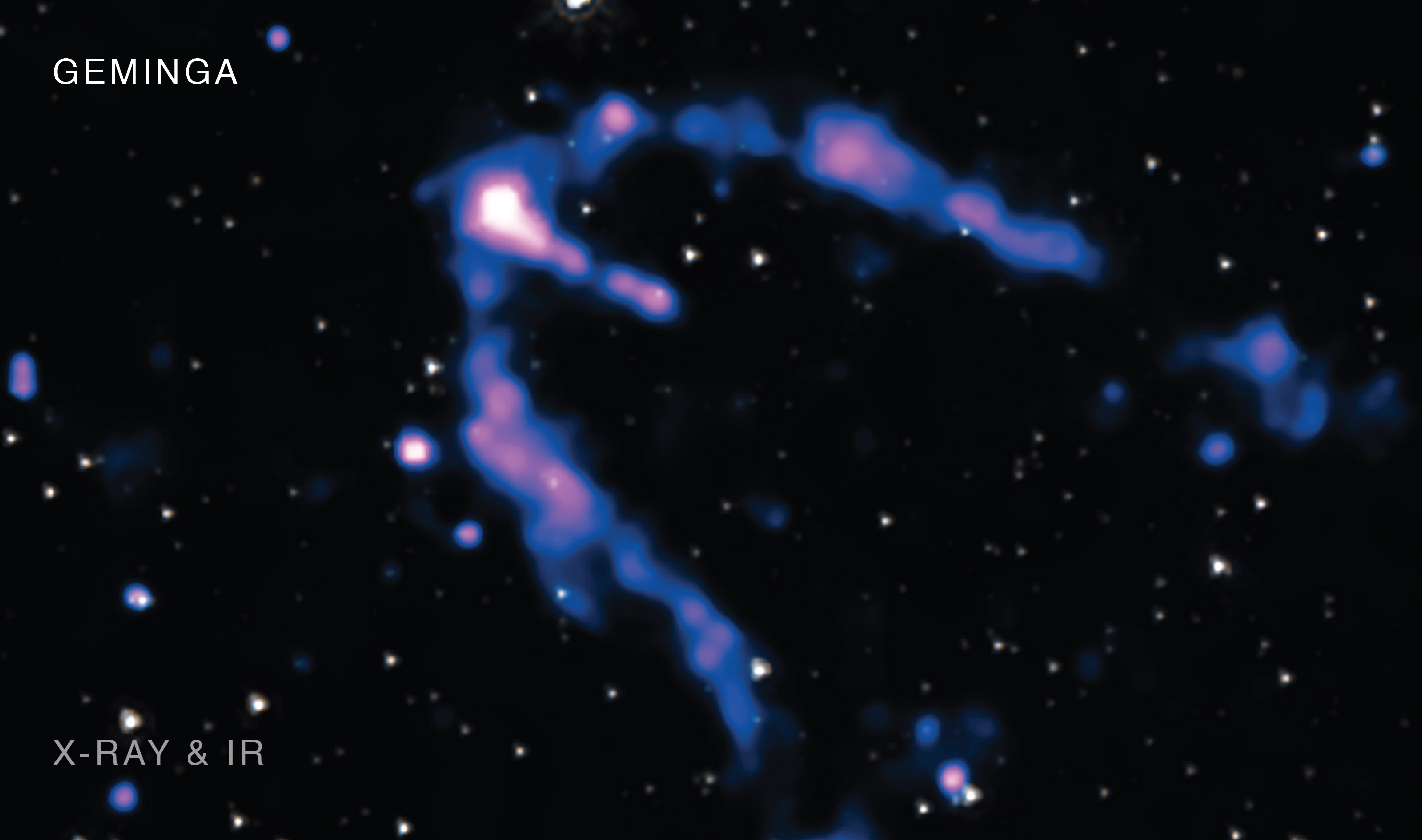
- Geminga as seen by Chandra and Spitzer; Credit: X-ray: NASA/CXC/PSU/B. Posselt et al; Infrared: NASA/JPL–Caltech

Observation data Epoch J2000.0 Equinox ICRS
- Constellation: Gemini
- Right ascension: 06^{h} 33^{m} 54.15^{s}
- Declination: +17° 46′ 12.9″
- Apparent magnitude (V): 25.5

Characteristics
- Evolutionary stage: Pulsar

Astrometry
Parallax (π)	4.0±1.3 mas
Distance	~815 ly (250+120 −62 pc)

Details
Rotation	0.237 s
Age	339,000 years

Other designations
- SN 437, PSR B0633+17, PSR J0633+1746

Database references
SIMBAD	data

Geminga (/ɡəˈmɪŋɡə/ gə-MING-gə) is a gamma ray and x-ray pulsar source thought to be a neutron star approximately 250 parsecs (around 800 light-years) from the Sun in the constellation Gemini.

Its name, attributed by its discoverer Giovanni Bignami, is both a contraction of Gemini gamma-ray source and a transcription of the words gh'è minga (pronounced [ɡɛ ˈmĩːɡa]), meaning "it's not there" in Bignami's native Milanese dialect of Lombard. The name was approved by the International Astronomical Union on 4 April 2022.

== Pulsar ==
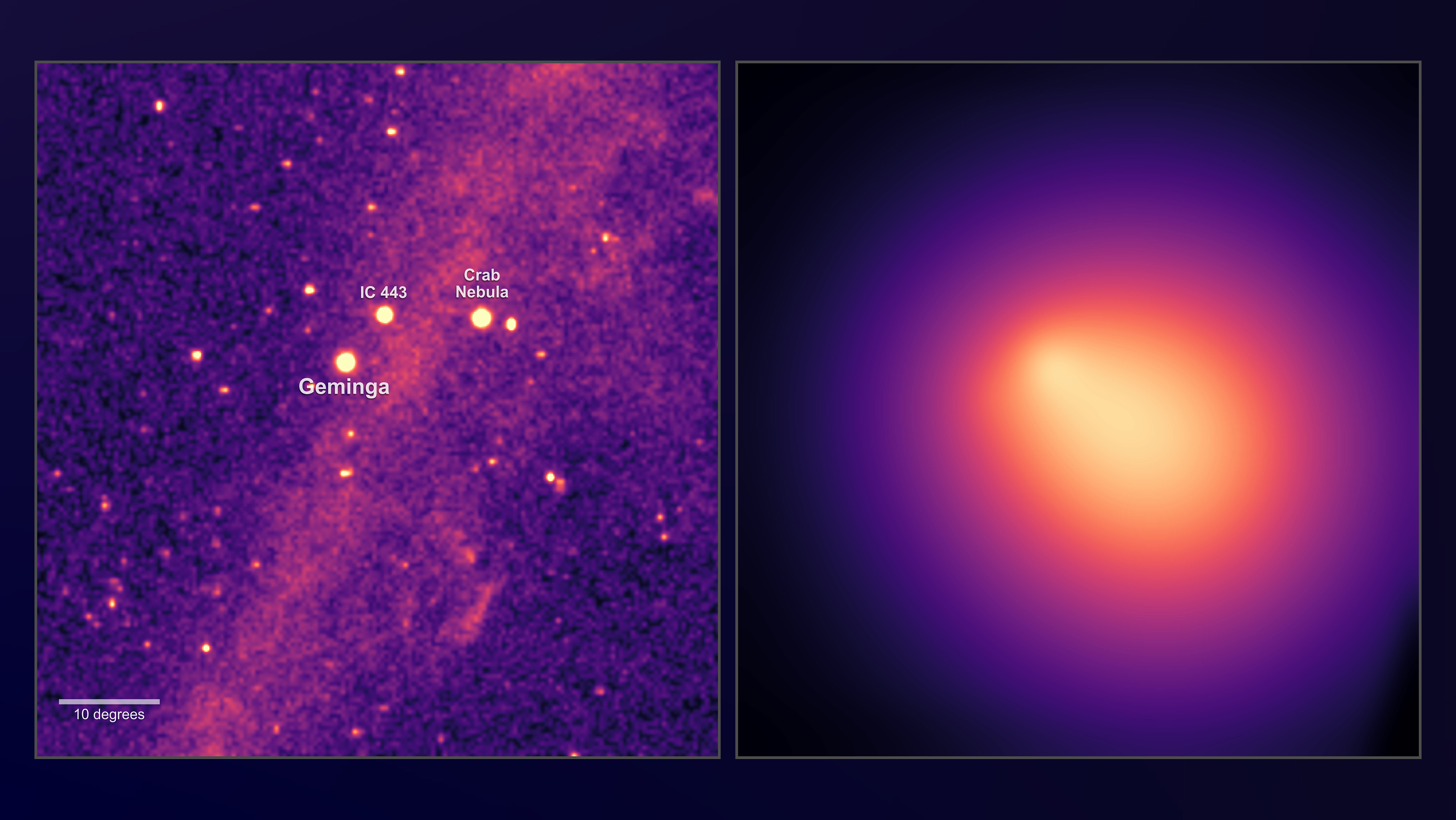
left: Geminga, IC 443 and the Crab Nebula. right: The halo around the pulsar Geminga seen by Fermi after removing bright sources

The nature of Geminga was quite unknown for 20 years after its discovery by NASA's Second Small Astronomy Satellite (SAS-2). Finally, in March 1991 the ROSAT satellite detected a periodicity of 237 milliseconds in soft x-ray emission. Thus, it is supposed that Geminga is a sort of neutron star: the degenerate core of a massive star that exploded as a supernova about 300,000 years ago.

It was once thought that this nearby explosion was responsible for the low density of the interstellar medium in the immediate vicinity of the Solar System. This low-density area is known as the Local Bubble. Possible evidence for this includes findings by the Arecibo Observatory that local micrometre-sized interstellar meteor particles appear to originate from its direction. More recently, however, it has been suggested that multiple supernovae in subgroup B1 of the Pleiades moving group were more likely responsible, becoming a remnant supershell.

A study from 2019, using data from NASA's Fermi Gamma-ray Space Telescope discovered a large gamma-ray halo around Geminga. Accelerated electrons and positrons collide with nearby starlight. The collision boosts the light up to much higher energies. Geminga alone could be responsible for as much as 20% of the high-energy positrons seen by the AMS-02 experiment. Previous studies using data from the High-Altitude Water Cherenkov Gamma-ray Observatory found only a small gamma-ray halo around Geminga at higher energies.

== Discovery and identification ==
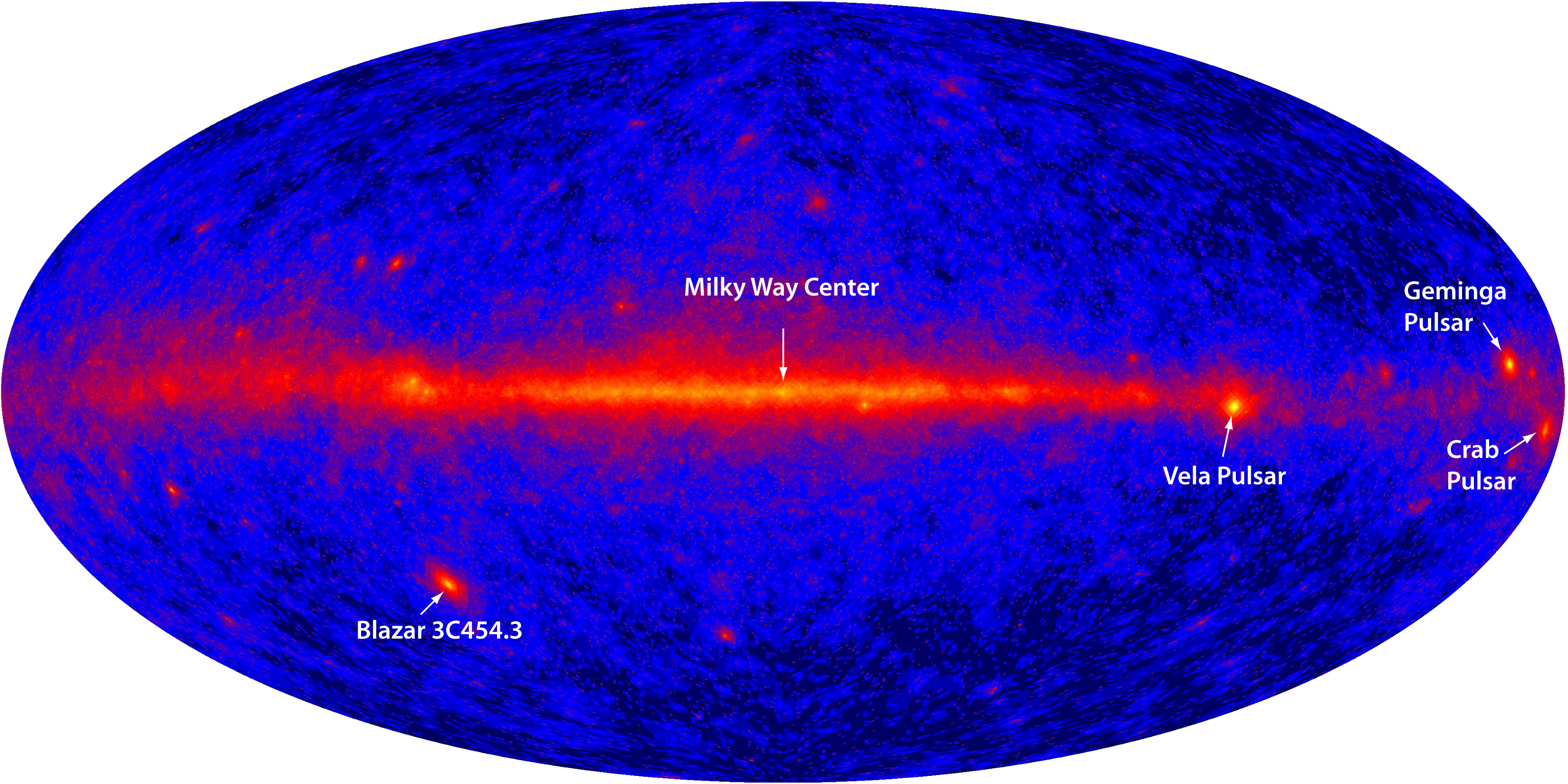
Position of Geminga in the Milky Way gamma-ray sky. Credit: NASA/DOE/International LAT Team

Geminga was the first example of an unidentified gamma-ray source, a source which could not be associated with any objects known at other wavelengths. It was first detected as a significant excess of gamma rays over the expected background of diffuse Galactic emission, by the SAS-2 satellite (Fichtel et al. 1975) and subsequently by the COS-B satellite. The SAS-2 group reported a pulsation in the gamma-ray signal, with period approximately 59 seconds, although the limited number of detected gamma rays (121 over a period of four months) led them to conclude that the pulsation was not statistically compelling. Due to the limited angular resolution of the instrument (approximately 2.5° at 100MeV) and the small number of gamma rays detected, the exact location of the source was uncertain, constrained only to be within a relatively large "error region". At the time of detection, four weak radio sources were known within this region, two supernova remnants bordered it and a known satellite galaxy to the Milky Way lay nearby. None of these known sources were convincing associations to the gamma-ray source, and the SAS-2 team suggested that an undiscovered radio-pulsar was the most likely progenitor.

NASA’s Fermi Gamma-ray Space Telescope has discovered a faint but sprawling glow around Geminga. If visible to the human eye, this gamma-ray “halo” would appear larger in the sky than the famed Big Dipper star pattern. The halo suggests Geminga could be responsible for a decade-long puzzle about one type of cosmic particle arriving from beyond the Solar system that is unusually abundant near Earth — positrons, the antimatter version of electrons.

Despite the investment of a significant amount of observation time, the source remained unidentified through the COS-B era; their data did, however, rule out the claimed 59 second pulsation. Many claims were made about the source during this time, but its nature remained a mystery until the identification of a candidate source by the Einstein x-ray satellite, 1E 0630+178. The characteristics of the x-ray source were unique: large x-ray to optical luminosity, no radio emission detected by the sensitive VLA instrument, point-like emission in the Einstein imager and an estimated distance of approximately 100 pc, placing it within the Galaxy. An association between the gamma-ray and x-ray sources was not conclusively made until the ROSAT x-ray imager detected a 237 millisecond pulsation, which was also seen in gamma rays by the EGRET instrument and retrospectively in the COS-B and SAS-2 data. Geminga thus appeared to be the first example of a radio-quiet pulsar, and served as an illustration of the difficulty of associating gamma-ray emission with objects known at other wavelengths: some characteristic of the gamma-ray source, such as periodicity or variability, must be identified in candidate counterparts at other wavelengths in order to make the connection of their identity.

Finally, this principle held true when radio emissions of matching 237 millisecond periodicity were found at previously unsurveyed frequencies of 100 MHz and below.

== Proper motion ==
The proper motion of Geminga is 178.2 ± 1.8 mas/year which corresponds (at a distance of 250 pc) to a transverse velocity of 211 kilometers per second. This velocity is very fast for a star, comparable to Barnard's Star.

== Timing measurements ==
Geminga underwent a minor glitch in the late part of 1996, with a fractional change in frequency of 6.2 × 10^{−10}.

A 1998 study of the pre-glitch ephemeris suggested that the timings were being affected by reflex motion due to the presence of a low-mass planet in a 5.1-year orbit; however, this was later shown to be an artifact of noise that affects the pulse times from Geminga rather than a genuine orbital effect.

== See also ==
- PSR B0355+54
