= PSR J0357+3205 =

Pulsar in the constellation Perseus

- Tour of PSR J0357+3205.

Observation data Epoch J2000.0 Equinox ICRS
- Constellation: Perseus
- Right ascension: 03^{h} 57^{m} 52.61^{s}
- Declination: +32° 05′ 12.4″

Characteristics
- Spectral type: Pulsar

Astrometry
Distance	1,600 ly (490.56 pc)

Details
Rotation	0.4441044988 s
Age	540,000 years

Database references
SIMBAD	data

PSR J0357+3205 is a pulsar is located about 1,600 light years from Earth. PSR J0357+3205 was originally discovered by the Fermi Gamma-ray Space Telescope in 2009. A spin period of 0.4441 seconds and is characteristic age of 540,000 years old.

== X-ray bright tail ==
A very long, X-ray bright tail (over 4 light years across) may be stretching away from PSR J0357+3205. The tail is puzzling because it shares characteristics with other tails extending from pulsars, but differs in certain properties. If the tail is at the same distance as the pulsar then it stretches for 4.2 light years in length. This would make it one of the longest X-ray tails ever associated with a so-called "rotation- powered" pulsar, a class of pulsar that get its power from the energy lost as the rotation of the pulsar slows down. (Other types of pulsars include those driven by strong magnetic fields and still others that are powered by material falling onto the neutron star.)

=== Explanation of the tail ===
The X-ray tail may be produced by emission from energetic particles in a pulsar wind, with the particles produced by the pulsar spiralling around magnetic field lines. Other X- ray tails around pulsars have been interpreted as bow-shocks generated by the supersonic motion of pulsars through space, with the wind trailing behind as its particles are swept back by the pulsar's interaction with the interstellar gas it encounters. However, this bow shock interpretation may or may not be correct for PSR J0357+3205, with several issues that need to be explained. For example, PSR J0357+3205 is losing a very small amount of energy as its spin slows down with time. This energy loss is important, because it is converted into radiation and powering a particle wind from the pulsar. This places limits on the amount of energy that particles in the wind can attain, and so might not account for the quantity of X-rays seen in the tail. Another challenge to this explanation is that other pulsars with bow shocks show bright X-ray emission surrounding the pulsar, and this is not seen for PSR J0357+3205. Also, the brightest portion of the tail is well away from the pulsar and this differs from what has been seen for other pulsars with bow shocks. If the pulsar is seen moving in the opposite direction from that of the tail, this would support the bow-shock idea.
