= Small Astronomy Satellite 2 =

Gamma ray telescope

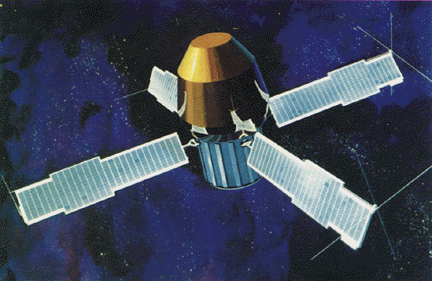
- Artist's impression of SAS-2
- Mission type: Earth science
- Operator: NASA
- COSPAR ID: 1972-091A
- SATCAT no.: 6282
- Mission duration: 6 months and 24 days

Spacecraft properties
- Launch mass: 166.0 kilograms (366.0 lb)

Start of mission
- Launch date: 15 November 1972
- Rocket: Scout D-1
- Launch site: San Marco

End of mission
- Last contact: 8 June 1973
- Decay date: 16 April 1979

Orbital parameters
- Reference system: Geocentric
- Regime: Low Earth
- Eccentricity: 0.01366
- Perigee altitude: 443 kilometers (275 mi)
- Apogee altitude: 632 kilometers (393 mi)
- Inclination: 1.9 degrees
- Period: 95.40 minutes
- Epoch: 15 November 1972, 22:13:00 UTC

The Small Astronomy Satellite 2, also known as SAS-2, SAS B or Explorer 48, was a NASA gamma ray telescope. It was launched on 15 November 1972 into the low Earth orbit with a periapsis of 443 km and an apoapsis of 632 km. It completed its observations on 8 June 1973.

== Mission ==
SAS 2 was the second in the series of small spacecraft designed to extend the astronomical studies in the X-ray, gamma-ray, ultraviolet, visible, and infrared regions. The primary objective of the SAS-B was to measure the spatial and energy distribution of primary galactic and extragalactic gamma radiation with energies between 20 and 300 MeV. The instrumentation consisted principally of a guard scintillation detector, an upper and a lower spark chamber, and a charged particle telescope.

== Launch ==
The spacecraft was launched on 15 November 1972 into an initial orbit of about 632 km (393 mi) of apogee, 443 km (275 mi) of perigee, 1.90° of orbital inclination, with an orbital period of 95.40 minutes. from the San Marco platform off the coast of Kenya, Africa, into a nearly equatorial orbit. The orbiting spacecraft was in the shape of a cylinder approximately 59 cm (23 in) in diameter and 135 cm (53 in) in length. Four solar paddles were used to recharge a 6 amp-h, eight-cell, nickel–cadmium battery and provide power to the spacecraft and telescope experiment. The spacecraft was spin stabilized by an internal wheel, and a magnetically torqued commandable control system was used to point the spin axis of the spacecraft to any point of the sky within approximately 1°. The experiment axis lay along this axis allowing the telescope to look at any selected region of the sky with its ± 30° acceptance aperture. The nominal spin rate was 1/12 rpm. Data were taken at 1000 bps and could be recorded on an onboard tape recorder and simultaneously transmitted in real time. The recorded data were transmitted once per orbit. This required approximately 5 minutes.

== Experiment ==
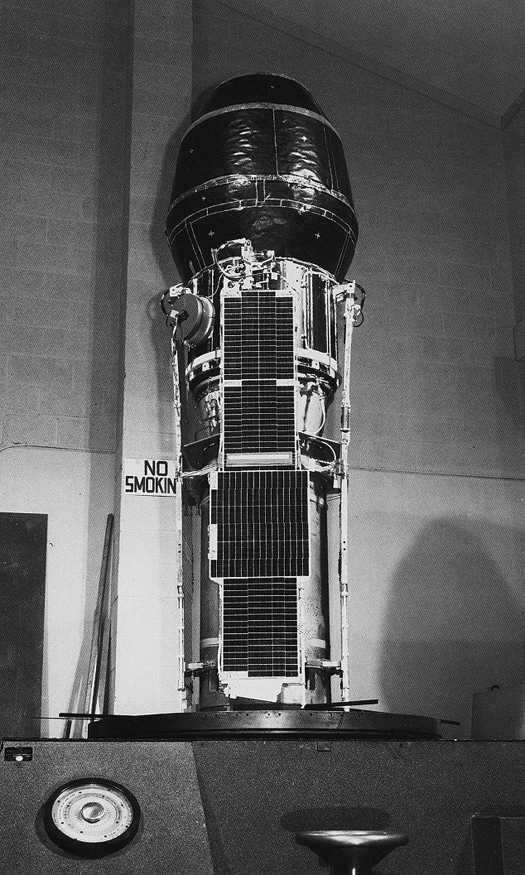
SAS 2

The telescope experiment was initially turned on 20 November 1972 and by 27 November 1972, the spacecraft became fully operational. The low-voltage power supply for the experiment failed on 8 June 1973. No useful scientific data were obtained after that date. With the exception of a slightly degraded star sensor, the spacecraft control section performed in an excellent manner.

SAS-2 first detected Geminga, a pulsar believed to be the remnant of a supernova that exploded 300,000 years ago.

=== Gamma-Ray Telescope ===
The instrument consisted of two spark-chamber assemblies, four plastic scintillation counters, four Cherenkov counters, and an anticoincidence scintillation counter dome assembled to form a telescope. The spark chamber assembly consisted of 16-wire spark-chamber modules with a magnetic core readout system. Sandwiched between these two assemblies was a plane of plastic scintillator formed by the four scintillation counters. Thin tungsten plates, averaging 0.010 cm (0.0039 in) thick, were interleaved between the spark chamber modules, which had an active area of 640-cm^{2}. These plates provided the material for the gamma ray to convert into an electron-positron pair and provided a means of determining the energy of these particles by measuring their coulomb scattering. The spark chamber modules revealed the position and direction of the particles; from this information, the energy and direction of the gamma ray was determined. The scintillation counters and the four directional Cerenkov counters that were placed below the second spark chamber assembly constituted four independent counter coincidence systems. The single-piece plastic scintillator dome surrounded the whole assembly except at the bottom to discriminate against charged particles. The threshold of the instrument was about 30-MeV, and energies up to about 200-MeV could be measured along with the integral flux above 200 MeV. The angular resolution of the telescope varied as a function of energy and arrival direction from 1.5° to 5°. During the lifetime of the experiment from 15 November 1972 to 8 June 1973, approximately 55% of the celestial sphere, including most of the galactic plane, was surveyed.

== See also ==
- Small Astronomy Satellite1
- Small Astronomy Satellite 3
