= Gamma-ray astronomy =

Observational astronomy performed with gamma rays

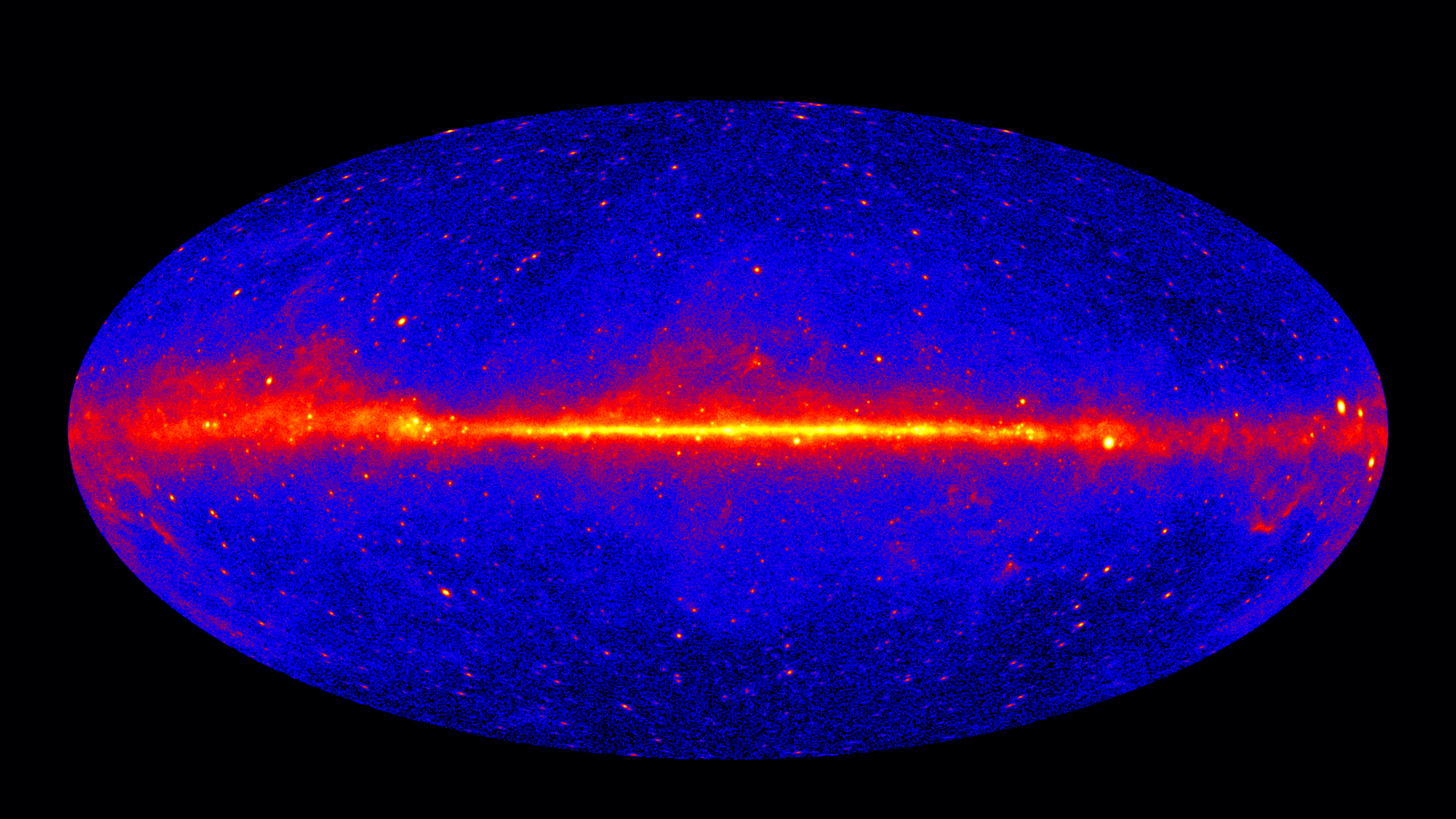
Survey of the sky at energies above 1 GeV, collected by the Fermi Gamma-ray Space Telescope in five years of observation (2009 to 2013).

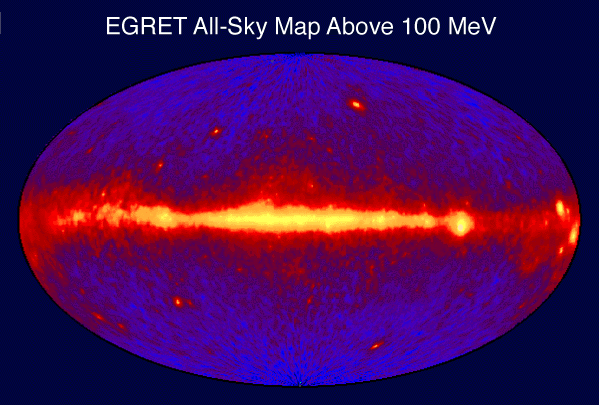
The sky at energies above 100 MeV observed by the Energetic Gamma Ray Experiment Telescope (EGRET) of the Compton Gamma Ray Observatory (CGRO) satellite .

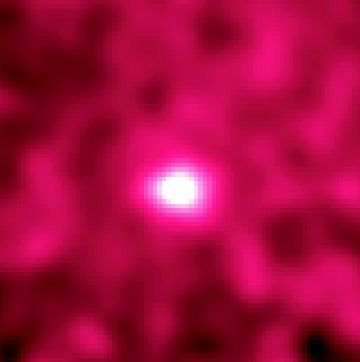
The Moon as seen by the Energetic Gamma Ray Experiment Telescope (EGRET), in gamma rays of greater than 20 MeV. These are produced by cosmic ray bombardment of its surface.

Gamma-ray astronomy is a subfield of astronomy where scientists observe and study celestial objects and phenomena in outer space which emit cosmic electromagnetic radiation in the form of gamma rays, (Note: Astronomical literature generally hyphenates "gamma-ray" when used as an adjective, but uses "gamma ray" without a hyphen for the noun.) i.e. photons with the highest energies (above 100 keV) at the very shortest wavelengths. X-ray astronomy uses the next lower energy range, X-ray radiation, with energy below 100 keV.

In most cases, gamma rays from solar flares and Earth's atmosphere fall in the MeV range, but it's now known that solar flares can also produce gamma rays in the GeV range, contrary to previous beliefs. Much of the detected gamma radiation stems from collisions between hydrogen gas and cosmic rays within our galaxy. These gamma rays, originating from diverse mechanisms such as electron-positron annihilation, the inverse Compton effect and in some cases gamma decay, occur in regions of extreme temperature, density, and magnetic fields, reflecting violent astrophysical processes like the decay of neutral pions. They provide insights into extreme events like supernovae, hypernovae, and the behavior of matter in environments such as pulsars and blazars. A huge number of gamma ray emitting high-energy systems like black holes, stellar coronas, neutron stars, white dwarf stars, remnants of supernova, clusters of galaxies, including the Crab Nebula and the Vela Pulsar (the most powerful source so far), have been identified, alongside an overall diffuse gamma-ray background along the plane of the Milky Way galaxy. Cosmic radiation with the highest energy triggers electron-photon cascades in the atmosphere, while lower-energy gamma rays are only detectable above it. Gamma-ray bursts, like GRB 190114C, are transient phenomena challenging our understanding of high-energy astrophysical processes, ranging from microseconds to several hundred seconds.

Gamma rays are difficult to detect due to their high energy and their blocking by the Earth’s atmosphere, necessitating balloon-borne detectors and artificial satellites in space. Early experiments in the 1950s and 1960s used balloons to carry instruments to access altitudes where the atmospheric absorption of gamma rays is low, followed by the launch of the first gamma-ray satellites: SAS 2 (1972) and COS-B (1975). These were defense satellites originally designed to detect gamma rays from secret nuclear testing, but they discovered puzzling gamma-ray bursts coming from deep space. In the 1970s, satellite observatories found several gamma-ray sources, among which a very strong source called Geminga was later identified as a pulsar in proximity. The Compton Gamma Ray Observatory (launched in 1991) revealed numerous gamma-ray sources in space. Today, both ground-based observatories like the VERITAS array and space-based telescopes like the Fermi Gamma-ray Space Telescope (launched in 2008) contribute significantly to gamma-ray astronomy. This interdisciplinary field involves collaboration among physicists, astrophysicists, and engineers in projects like the High Energy Stereoscopic System (H.E.S.S.), which explores extreme astrophysical environments like the vicinity of black holes in active galactic nuclei.

Studying gamma rays provides valuable insights into extreme astrophysical environments, as observed by the H.E.S.S. Observatory. Ongoing research aims to expand our understanding of gamma-ray sources, such as blazars, and their implications for cosmology. As GeV gamma rays are important in the study of extra-solar, and especially extragalactic, astronomy, new observations may complicate some prior models and findings.

Future developments in gamma-ray astronomy will integrate data from gravitational wave and neutrino observatories (Multi-messenger astronomy), enriching our understanding of cosmic events like neutron star mergers. Technological advancements, including advanced mirror designs, better camera technologies, improved trigger systems, faster readout electronics, high-performance photon detectors like Silicon photomultipliers (SiPMs), alongside data processing algorithms like time tagging techniques and event reconstruction methods, will enhance spatial and temporal resolution. Machine learning algorithms and big data analytics will facilitate the extraction of meaningful insights from vast datasets, leading to discoveries of new gamma-ray sources, identification of specific gamma-ray signatures, and improved modeling of gamma-ray emission mechanisms. Future missions may include space telescopes and lunar gamma-ray observatories (taking advantage of the Moon's lack of atmosphere and stable environment for prolonged observations), enabling observations in previously inaccessible regions. The ground-based Cherenkov Telescope Array project, a next-generation gamma ray observatory which will incorporate many of these improvements and will be ten times more sensitive, is planned to be fully operational by 2025.

== Early history ==
Long before experiments could detect gamma rays emitted by cosmic sources, scientists had known that the universe should be producing them. Work by Eugene Feenberg and Henry Primakoff in 1948, Sachio Hayakawa and I.B. Hutchinson in 1952, and, especially, Philip Morrison in 1958 had led scientists to believe that a number of different processes which were occurring in the universe would result in gamma-ray emission. These processes included cosmic ray interactions with interstellar gas, supernova explosions, and interactions of energetic electrons with magnetic fields. However, it was not until the 1960s that our ability to actually detect these emissions came to pass.

Most gamma rays coming from space are absorbed by the Earth's atmosphere, so gamma-ray astronomy could not develop until it was possible to get detectors above all or most of the atmosphere using balloons and spacecraft. The first gamma-ray telescope carried into orbit, on the Explorer 11 satellite in 1961, picked up fewer than 100 cosmic gamma-ray photons. They appeared to come from all directions in the Universe, implying some sort of uniform "gamma-ray background". Such a background would be expected from the interaction of cosmic rays (very energetic charged particles in space) with interstellar gas.

The first true astrophysical gamma-ray sources were solar flares, which revealed the strong 2.223 MeV line predicted by Morrison. This line results from the formation of deuterium via the union of a neutron and proton; in a solar flare the neutrons appear as secondaries from interactions of high-energy ions accelerated in the flare process. These first gamma-ray line observations were from OSO 3, OSO 7, and the Solar Maximum Mission, the latter spacecraft launched in 1980. The solar observations inspired theoretical work by Reuven Ramaty and others.

Significant gamma-ray emission from our galaxy was first detected in 1967 by the detector aboard the OSO 3 satellite. It detected 621 events attributable to cosmic gamma rays. However, the field of gamma-ray astronomy took great leaps forward with the SAS-2 (1972) and the Cos-B (1975–1982) satellites. These two satellites provided an exciting view into the high-energy universe (sometimes called the 'violent' universe, because the kinds of events in space that produce gamma rays tend to be high-speed collisions and similar processes). They confirmed the earlier findings of the gamma-ray background, produced the first detailed map of the sky at gamma-ray wavelengths, and detected a number of point sources. However the resolution of the instruments was insufficient to identify most of these point sources with specific visible stars or stellar systems.

A discovery in gamma-ray astronomy came in the late 1960s and early 1970s from a constellation of military defense satellites. Detectors on board the Vela satellite series, designed to detect flashes of gamma rays from nuclear bomb blasts, began to record bursts of gamma rays from deep space rather than the vicinity of the Earth. Later detectors determined that these gamma-ray bursts are seen to last for fractions of a second to minutes, appearing suddenly from unexpected directions, flickering, and then fading after briefly dominating the gamma-ray sky. Studied since the mid-1980s with instruments on board a variety of satellites and space probes, including Soviet Venera spacecraft and the Pioneer Venus Orbiter, the sources of these enigmatic high-energy flashes remain a mystery. They appear to come from far away in the Universe, and currently the most likely theory seems to be that at least some of them come from so-called hypernova explosions—supernovas creating black holes rather than neutron stars.

Nuclear gamma rays were observed from the solar flares of August 4 and 7, 1972, and November 22, 1977. A solar flare is an explosion in a solar atmosphere and was originally detected visually in the Sun. Solar flares create massive amounts of radiation across the full electromagnetic spectrum from the longest wavelength, radio waves, to high energy gamma rays. The correlations of the high energy electrons energized during the flare and the gamma rays are mostly caused by nuclear combinations of high energy protons and other heavier ions. These gamma rays can be observed and allow scientists to determine the major results of the energy released, which is not provided by the emissions from other wavelengths.

See also Magnetar#1979 discovery detection of a soft gamma repeater.

== Detector technology ==
Observation of gamma rays first became possible in the 1960s. Their observation is much more problematic than that of X-rays or of visible light, because gamma-rays are comparatively rare, even a "bright" source needing an observation time of several minutes before it is even detected, and because gamma rays are difficult to focus, resulting in a very low resolution. The most recent generation of gamma-ray telescopes (2000s) have a resolution of the order of 6 arc minutes in the GeV range (seeing the Crab Nebula as a single "pixel"), compared to 0.5 arc seconds seen in the low energy X-ray (1 keV) range by the Chandra X-ray Observatory (1999), and about 1.5 arc minutes in the high energy X-ray (100 keV) range seen by High-Energy Focusing Telescope (2005).

Very energetic gamma rays, with photon energies over ~30 GeV, can also be detected by ground-based experiments. The extremely low photon fluxes at such high energies require detector effective areas that are impractically large for current space-based instruments. Such high-energy photons produce extensive showers of secondary particles in the atmosphere that can be observed on the ground, both directly by radiation counters and optically via the Cherenkov light which the ultra-relativistic shower particles emit. The Imaging Atmospheric Cherenkov Telescope technique currently achieves the highest sensitivity.

Gamma radiation in the TeV range emanating from the Crab Nebula was first detected in 1989 by the Fred Lawrence Whipple Observatory at Mt. Hopkins, in Arizona in the USA. Modern Cherenkov telescope experiments like H.E.S.S., VERITAS, MAGIC, and CANGAROO III can detect the Crab Nebula in a few minutes. The most energetic photons (up to 16 TeV) observed from an extragalactic object originate from the blazar, Markarian 501 (Mrk 501). These measurements were done by the High-Energy-Gamma-Ray Astronomy (HEGRA) air Cherenkov telescopes.

Gamma-ray astronomy observations are still limited by non-gamma-ray backgrounds at lower energies, and, at higher energy, by the number of photons that can be detected. Larger area detectors and better background suppression are essential for progress in the field. A discovery in 2012 may allow focusing gamma-ray telescopes. At photon energies greater than 700 keV, the index of refraction starts to increase again.

== 1980s to 1990s ==
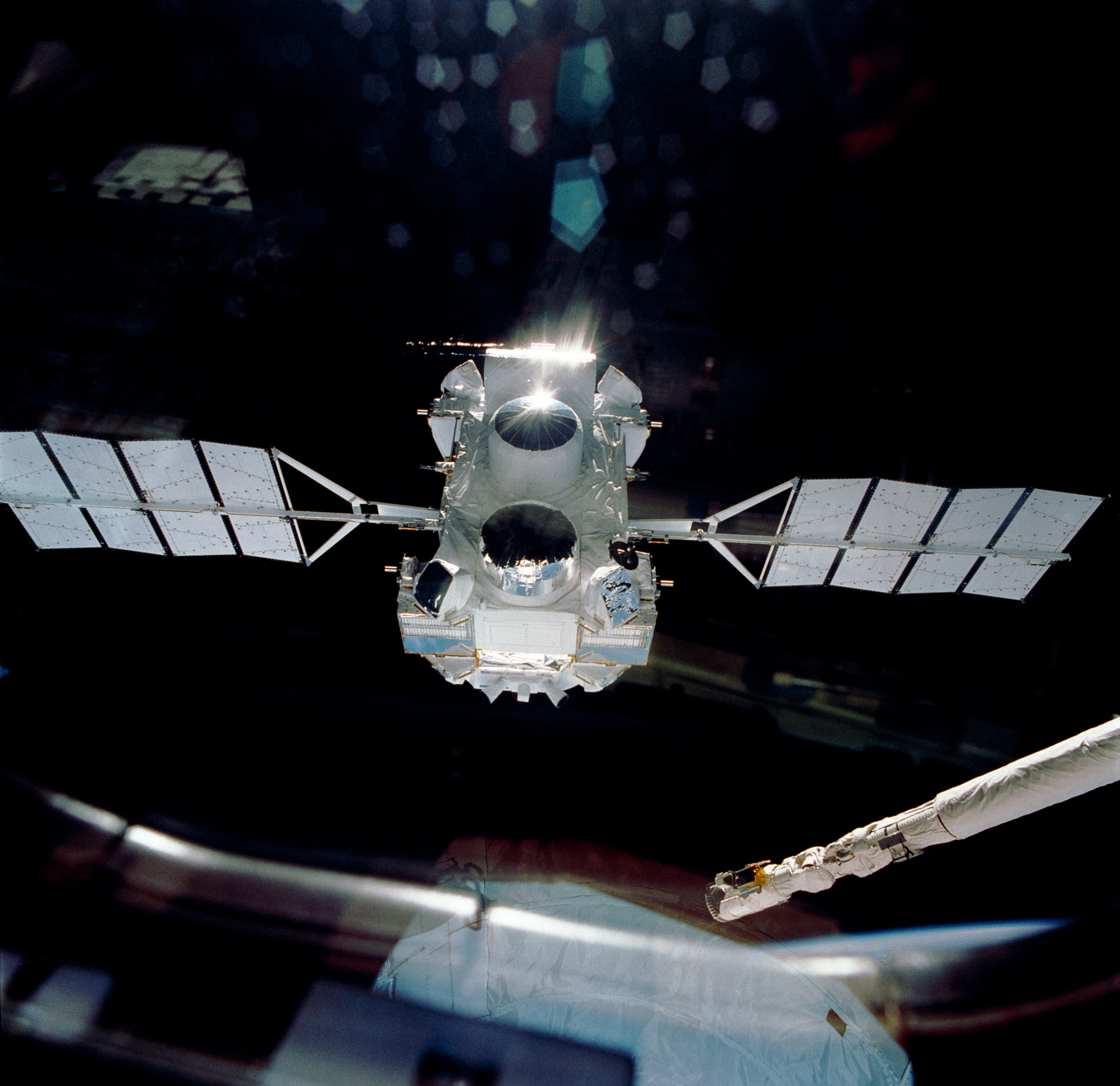
Compton released into orbit by the Space Shuttle, 1991

On June 19, 1988, from Birigüi (50° 20' W, 21° 20' S) at 10:15 UTC a balloon launch occurred which carried two NaI(Tl) detectors (600 cm^{2} total area) to an air pressure altitude of 5.5 mb for a total observation time of 6 hours. The supernova SN1987A in the Large Magellanic Cloud (LMC) was discovered on February 23, 1987, and its progenitor, Sanduleak -69 202, was a blue supergiant with luminosity of 2-5×10^{38} erg/s. The 847 keV and 1238 keV gamma-ray lines from ^{56}Co decay have been detected.

During its High Energy Astronomy Observatory program in 1977, NASA announced plans to build a "great observatory" for gamma-ray astronomy. The Compton Gamma Ray Observatory (CGRO) was designed to take advantage of the major advances in detector technology during the 1980s, and was launched in 1991. The satellite carried four major instruments which have greatly improved the spatial and temporal resolution of gamma-ray observations. The CGRO provided large amounts of data which are being used to improve our understanding of the high-energy processes in our Universe. CGRO was de-orbited in June 2000 as a result of the failure of one of its stabilizing gyroscopes.

BeppoSAX was launched in 1996 and deorbited in 2003. It predominantly studied X-rays, but also observed gamma-ray bursts. By identifying the first non-gamma ray counterparts to gamma-ray bursts, it opened the way for their precise position determination and optical observation of their fading remnants in distant galaxies.

The High Energy Transient Explorer 2 (HETE-2) was launched in October 2000 (on a nominally 2-year mission) and was still operational (but fading) in March 2007. The HETE-2 mission ended in March 2008.

== 2000s and 2010s ==
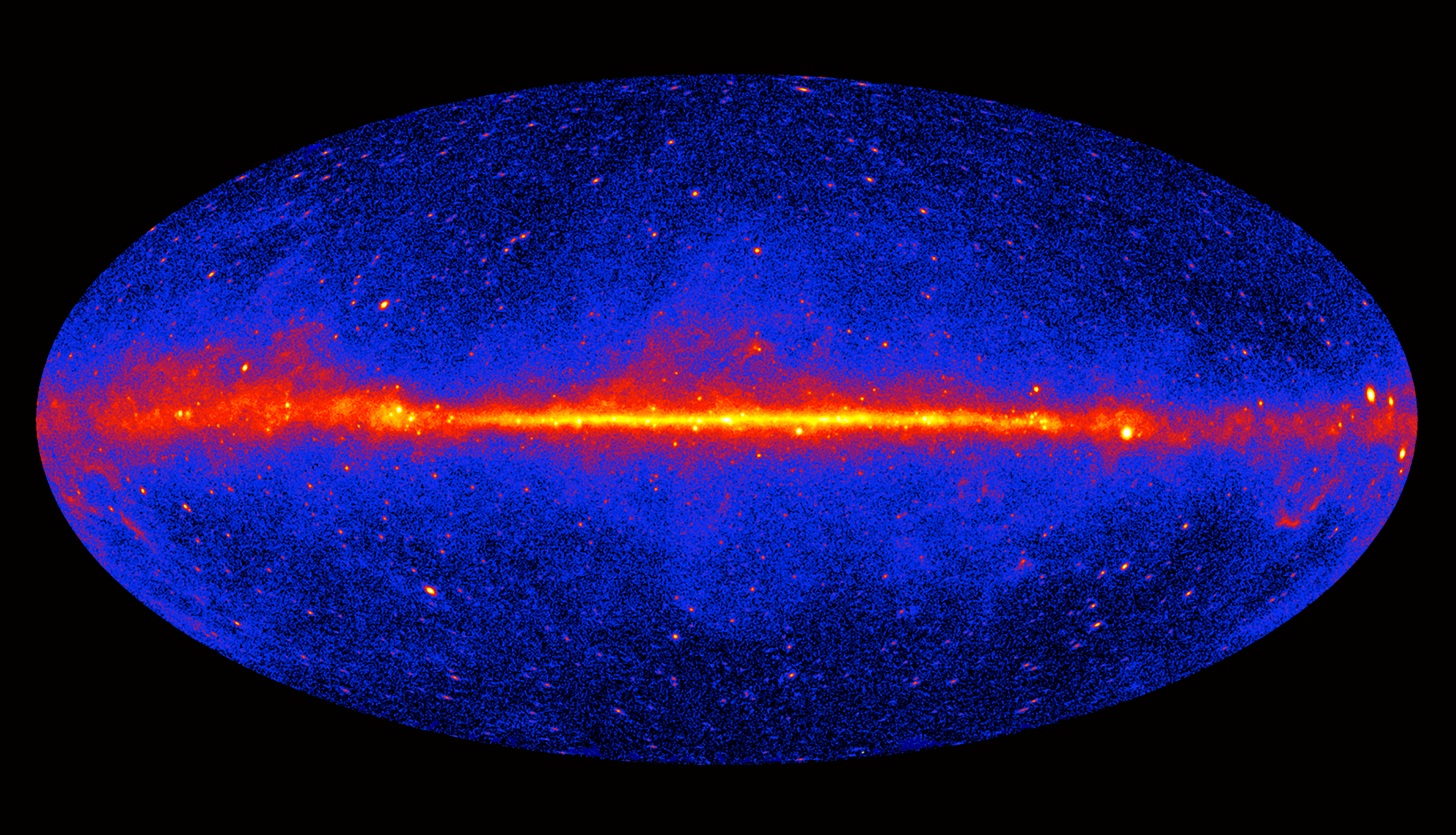
First survey of the sky at energies above 1 GeV, collected by Fermi in three years of observation (2009 to 2011).

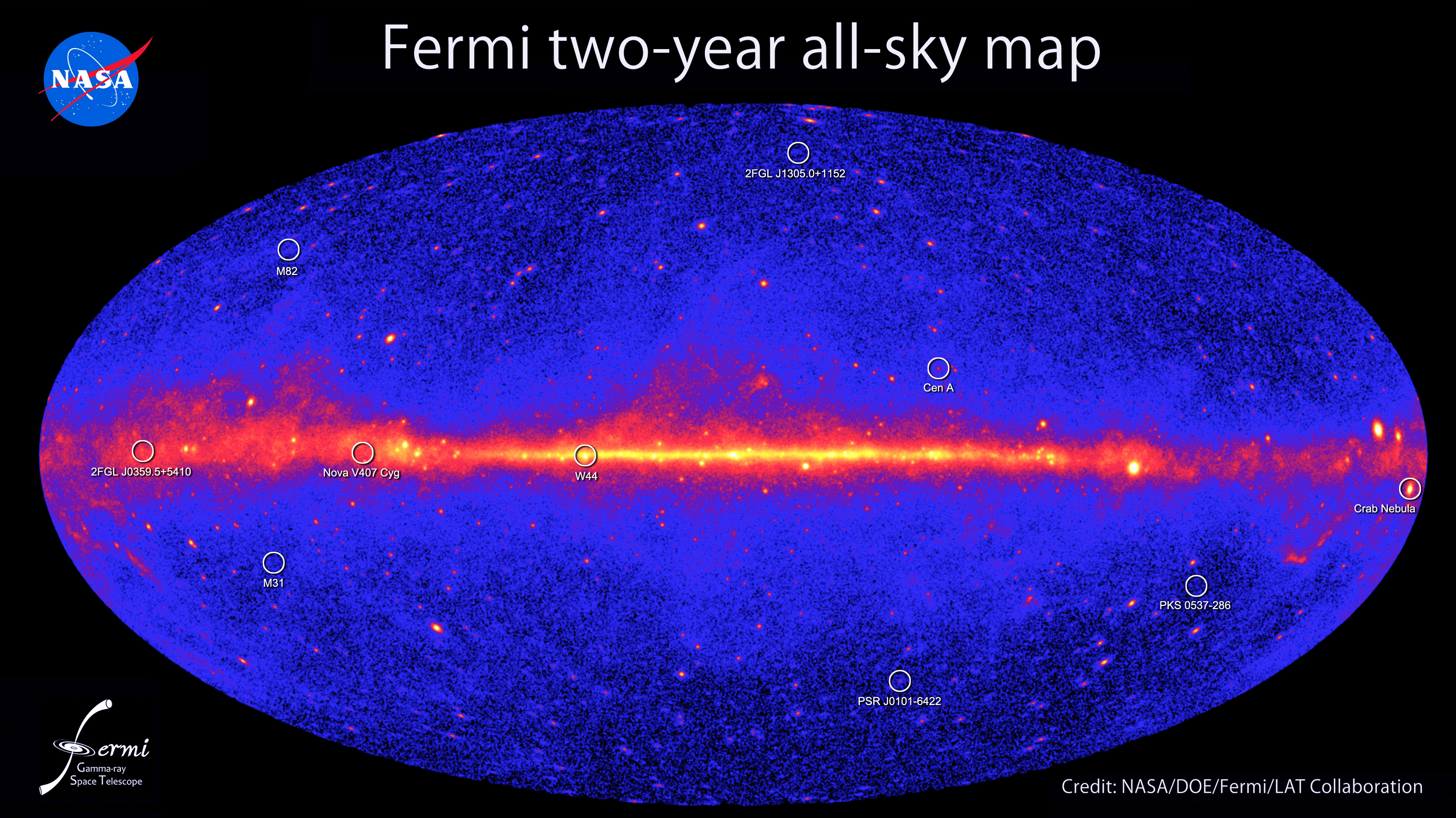
Fermi Second Catalog of Gamma-Ray Sources constructed over two years. All-sky image showing energies greater than 1 GeV. Brighter colors indicate gamma-ray sources.

Swift, a NASA spacecraft, was launched in 2004 and carries the BAT instrument for gamma-ray burst observations. Following BeppoSAX and HETE-2, it has observed numerous X-ray and optical counterparts to bursts, leading to distance determinations and detailed optical follow-up. These have established that most bursts originate in the explosions of massive stars (supernovas and hypernovas) in distant galaxies. As of 2021, Swift remains operational.

Currently the (other) main space-based gamma-ray observatories are INTEGRAL (International Gamma-Ray Astrophysics Laboratory), Fermi, and AGILE (Astro-rivelatore Gamma a Immagini Leggero).

- INTEGRAL (launched on October 17, 2002) is an ESA mission with additional contributions from the Czech Republic, Poland, US, and Russia.
- AGILE is an all-Italian small mission by ASI, INAF and INFN collaboration. It was successfully launched by the Indian PSLV-C8 rocket from the Sriharikota ISRO base on April 23, 2007.
- Fermi was launched by NASA on June 11, 2008. It includes LAT, the Large Area Telescope, and GBM, the Gamma-Ray Burst Monitor, for studying gamma-ray bursts.

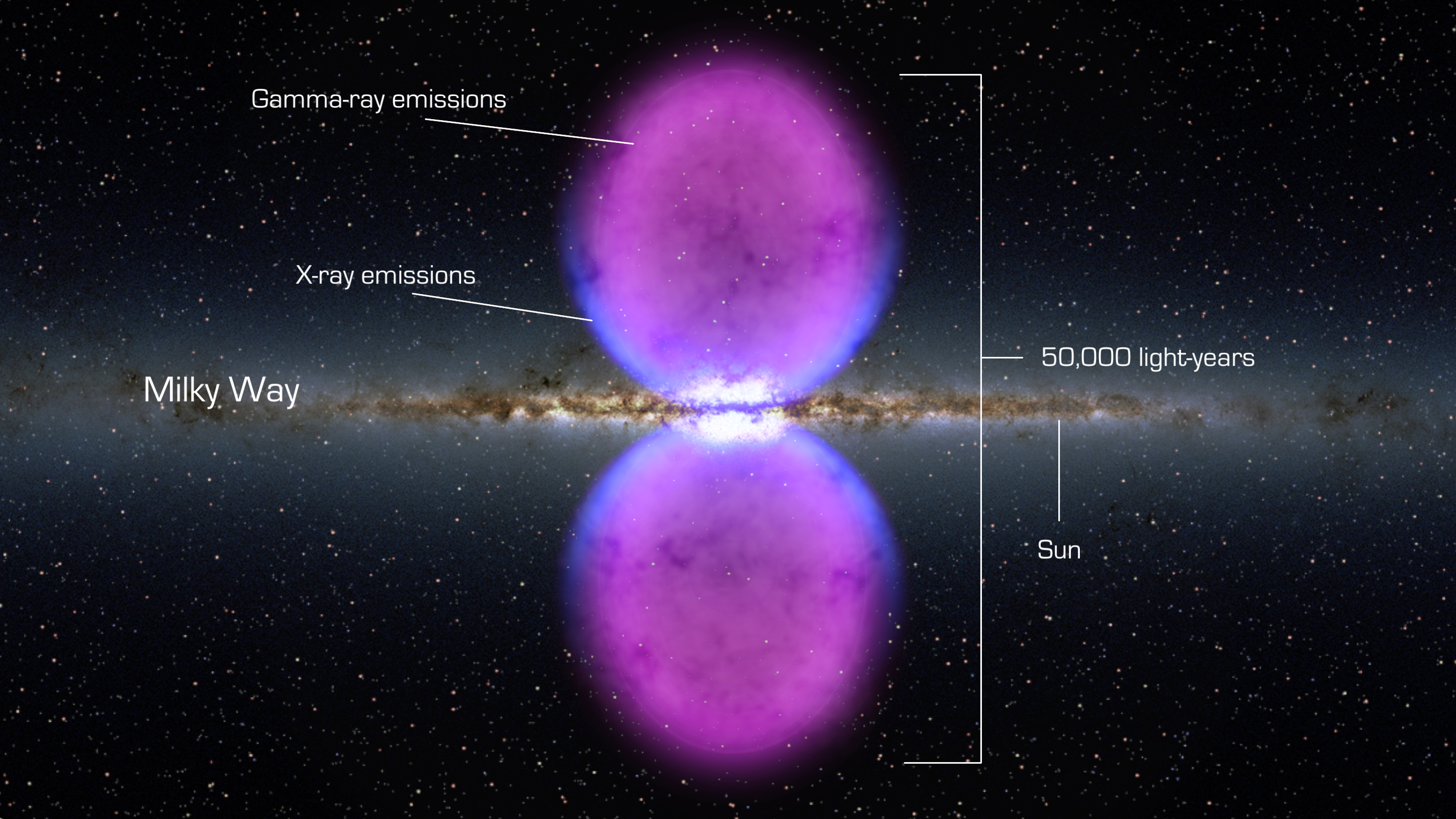
Concept of two gigantic gamma-ray bubbles at the heart of the Milky Way.

In November 2010, using the Fermi Gamma-ray Space Telescope, two gigantic gamma-ray bubbles, spanning about 25,000 light-years across, were detected at the heart of the Milky Way. These bubbles of high-energy radiation are suspected as erupting from a massive black hole or evidence of a burst of star formations from millions of years ago. They were discovered after scientists filtered out the "fog of background gamma-rays suffusing the sky". This discovery confirmed previous clues that a large unknown "structure" was in the center of the Milky Way.

In 2011 the Fermi team released its second catalog of gamma-ray sources detected by the satellite's Large Area Telescope (LAT), which produced an inventory of 1,873 objects shining with the highest-energy form of light. 57% of the sources are blazars. Over half of the sources are active galaxies, their central black holes created gamma-ray emissions detected by the LAT. One third of the sources have not been detected in other wavelengths.

Ground-based gamma-ray observatories include HAWC, MAGIC, HESS, and VERITAS. Ground-based observatories probe a higher energy range than space-based observatories, since their effective areas can be many orders of magnitude larger than a satellite.

== Recent observations ==
In April 2018, the largest catalog yet of high-energy gamma-ray sources in space was published.

In a 18 May 2021 press release, China's Large High Altitude Air Shower Observatory (LHAASO) reported the detection of a dozen ultra-high-energy gamma rays with energies exceeding 1 peta-electron-volt (quadrillion electron-volts or PeV), including one at 1.4 PeV, the highest energy photon ever observed. The authors of the report have named the sources of these PeV gamma rays PeVatrons. In 2024, LHAASO announced the detection of a 2.5 PeV gamma ray originating from the Cygnus X region.

=== Gamma-Ray Burst GRB221009A 2022 ===
Astronomers using the Gemini South telescope located in Chile observed flash from a Gamma-Ray Burst identified as GRB221009A, on 14 October 2022. Gamma-ray bursts are the most energetic flashes of light known to occur in the universe. Scientists of NASA estimated that the burst occurred at a point 2.4 billion light-years from earth. The gamma-ray burst occurred as some giant stars exploded at the ends of their lives before collapsing into black holes, in the direction of the constellation Sagitta. This burst was so energetic that individual photons arriving at Earth were detected with energies up to 18 teraelectronvolts (TeV), which is several trillion times the energy carried by photons of visible light and among the highest-energy photons ever observed. It seemed that GRB221009A was a long gamma-ray burst, possibly triggered by a supernova explosion.

== See also ==
- Cosmic-ray observatory
- Galactic Center GeV excess
- Gamma-ray Burst Coordinates Network
- History of gamma-ray burst research
- Ultra-high-energy cosmic ray
