= Energetic Gamma Ray Experiment Telescope =

Instrument on NASA's Compton Gamma Ray Observatory satellite

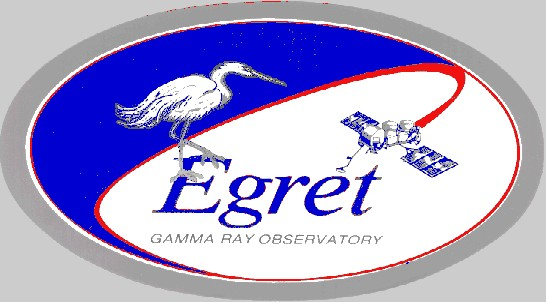
The instrument's logo.

The sky as seen in high-energy gamma rays.

The Energetic Gamma Ray Experiment Telescope (EGRET) was one of four instruments outfitted on NASA's Compton Gamma Ray Observatory satellite. Since lower energy gamma rays cannot be accurately detected on Earth's surface, EGRET was built to detect gamma rays while in space. EGRET was created for the purpose of detecting and collecting data on gamma rays ranging in energy level from 30 MeV to 30 GeV.

To accomplish its task, EGRET was equipped with a spark chamber, calorimeter, and plastic scintillator anti-coincidence dome. The spark chamber was used to induce a process called electron-positron pair production as a gamma ray entered the telescope. The calorimeter on the telescope was then used to record the data from the electron or positron. To reject other energy rays that would skew the data, scientists covered the telescope with a plastic scintillator anti-coincidence dome. The dome acted as a shield for the telescope and blocked out any unwanted energy rays.

The telescope was calibrated to only record gamma rays entering the telescope at certain angles. As these gamma rays entered the telescope, the rays went through the telescopes spark chamber and started the production of an electron and positron. The calorimeter then detected the electron or positron and recorded its data, such as energy level.

From EGRET's finds, scientists have affirmed many long-standing theories about energy waves in space. Scientists have also been able to categorize and characterize four pulsars. Scientists were able to map an entire sky of gamma rays with EGRET's results as well as find out interesting facts about Earth's Moon and the Sun.

EGRET is a predecessor of the Fermi Gamma-ray Space Telescope LAT.

== Design ==
The basic design of EGRET was basically a chamber filled with a special type of metal, a sensor at the bottom of the chamber to capture and record gamma rays, and finally a protective covering over the entire instrument. The chamber would manipulate the gamma ray into a way that it could be recorded. The sensor would capture and record the characteristics of the gamma ray. Finally, an anticoincidence identifies unwanted particles.

With the purpose of detecting individual gamma rays ranging from 30 MeV to 30 GeV, EGRET was equipped with a plastic scintillator anti-coincidence dome, spark chamber, and calorimeter. Starting from the outside of the telescope, scientists covered EGRET with a plastic scintillator anti-coincidence dome. The dome acted as a shield, blocking any unwanted energy waves from entering the telescope and skewing the data. To actually create recordable, usable data, scientists used a process called electron-positron pair production, which is creating an electron and positron simultaneously near a nucleus or subatomic particle. In order to induce this process, scientists assembled a multilevel thin-plate spark chamber within the telescope. A spark chamber is basically a chamber with many plates of metal and gases such as helium or neon. Finally, to record the data from the electron or positron about the gamma ray, scientists equipped EGRET with a thallium-activated sodium iodide (NaI(Tl)) calorimeter at its base. The calorimeter captured the spectrum of the gamma rays that EGRET detected.

== Function ==
Since NASA scientists wanted only certain types of gamma rays to be processed and recorded, they set up EGRET with many systems of checks to filter out any unwanted information. The most basic type of filter EGRET had was only allowing gamma rays entering the telescope from certain angles to be let into the spark chamber. As the gamma ray travelled through the spark chamber, it struck one of the metal plates within the spark chamber. Once the gamma ray came in contact with a plate of metal, it initiated the process of electron-positron pair production and created an electron and positron. Once both the electron and positron were created, if one of these particles was still moving down throughout the telescope and a signal from the anticoincidence scintillator was not fired, the particle was imaged and its energy level recorded. With each gamma ray having to pass all of these systems of checks, the results of EGRET were supported to be the most valuable out of the other CGRO instruments.

== Findings ==
Throughout EGRET's active life span, which went from 1991 to 2000, all of the gamma rays it collected and recorded were done one at a time. From each individual gamma ray that entered EGRET, scientists were able to create a detailed map of the “entire high-energy gamma-ray sky.” From its findings and mapping of the universe, scientists were able to reaffirm many long holding theories about gamma rays and their origins. NASA scientists also discovered that pulsars, which are “rotating neutron stars that emit a beam of electromagnetic radiation,” are the best sources of gamma rays. Scientists have also been able to detect and characterize the properties of 4 pulsars. EGRET's results also pointed out to scientists that the Earth's Moon is particularly brighter than the Sun the majority of the time. EGRET provided scientists with information that allowed them into a new understanding of the universe.
