= Lynn Cominsky =

American astrophysicist and educator

- Born: Lynn Ruth Cominsky; Buffalo, New York
- Education: Brandeis University (B.A); Massachusetts Institute of Technology, PhD)
- Occupations: Professor, Physics & Astronomy at Sonoma State University and Director Emerita, EdEon STEM Learning
- Scientific career
- Fields: Physics, astrophysics, cosmology, science education
- Institutions: Sonoma State University

Lynn Ruth Cominsky is an American astrophysicist and science educator. She served as Chair of the Department of Astronomy and Physics at Sonoma State University in Rohnert Park, California, from August 2004 to August 2019.

Cominsky is director emerita of EdEon STEM Learning (formerly the NASA Education and Public Outreach Group at Sonoma State University), which was renamed in 2018.

== Early career ==
Cominsky began her undergraduate studies at Brandeis University in 1971, where she originally majored in psychology. After being asked to dissect a cat's brain in her first college course, she changed majors and began studying physical sciences. Cominsky obtained a B.A. in physics with honors in chemistry, and graduated magna cum laude. She researched with Irving Epstein on the Belusov oscillating reaction. After graduating, she worked at the Center for Astrophysics | Harvard & Smithsonian, where she began analyzing data from X-ray astronomy satellites beginning with the UHURU satellite (and helping to compile the 4U catalog), prior to attending graduate school. While a graduate student at M. I. T., and using data from the SAS-3 satellite, she discovered X-ray pulsations from 4U0115+63 (together with George Clark); these pulsations were then used to show that transient X-ray. sources were in binary systems. Her thesis work with Walter Lewin and Paul Joss, was entitled "X-ray Burst Sources" and consisted of extensive analysis of the SAS-3 timing and spectral data, as well as theoretical thermonuclear flash modeling. During a post-doctoral fellowship at UC Berkeley Space Sciences Laboratory, and using a combination of SAS-3 and HEAO A-1 data, she (and Kent Wood) discovered the 7.1 h X-ray binary period and the first eclipses from an X-ray burst source, MXB1659-29. Another highlight of Cominsky's research career was the discovery of X-ray emission from the first radio pulsar found to be in a binary orbit with a Be star, PSR 1259–63.

For two years following her post-doctoral work at UC Berkeley, Cominsky managed various aspects of Stuart Bowyer's Extreme UltraViolet Explorer Satellite project, including the design of the science operations and ground data analysis system.

== Sonoma State University ==
Cominsky joined the faculty at Sonoma State University (SSU) in 1986, where she is a professor of physics and astronomy. She served as chair of the Department of Physics and Astronomy from 2004 to 2019 and also chaired the Department of Chemistry on two occasions, first from August 2005 to January 2007 and later during a subsequent interim term.

In 1992, Cominsky began a collaboration with scientists at the Stanford Linear Accelerator Center (SLAC), including Elliott Bloom. This collaboration led to her long-term involvement with NASA's Fermi Gamma-ray Space Telescope (formerly the Gamma-ray Large Area Space Telescope, GLAST), for which she played a major role in education and public engagement activities.

In 1999, Cominsky founded EdEon STEM Learning at Sonoma State University, originally established as the Education and Public Outreach (E/PO) Group and renamed in 2018.

She serves as director emerita of EdEon and has been principal investigator or co-principal investigator on approximately $43 million in competitive federal and state grants, with an additional $2 million awarded to EdEon projects on which she did not serve in either role.

Through EdEon, she has overseen the development and national dissemination of STEM curricula, digital resources, and teacher professional development programs serving students and educators in grades 5–14, as well as the general public.

As part of these efforts, Cominsky has contributed to education initiatives for multiple NASA missions, including Fermi, NuSTAR, and LIGO, and served as final technical reviewer for mission-related educational products.

EdEon's largest NASA-funded project was the Education and Public Outreach program for the Fermi Gamma-ray Space Telescope mission. Launched on June 11, 2008, Fermi (formerly known as GLAST) is a space mission that uses silicon strip detectors to observe cosmic gamma-radiation from objects such as pulsars and quasars in the energy range 10 MeV - 300 GeV. Cominsky's group also led the Education and Public Outreach team for the Swift Gamma-Ray Burst Mission, launched on November 20, 2004. In 2003, Cominsky assumed the lead for the outreach effort for the US portion of the European Space Agency's XMM-Newton satellite. From 1999 to 2005, Cominsky was also the principal investigator and faculty advisor for the North Bay Science Project, a California Science Project site located at SSU. Other major projects developed by the SSU E/PO group include an online Cosmology curriculum for undergraduates, and an innovative curriculum for secondary students to build small payloads for launch on high-powered rockets and balloons. Cominsky is also a scientific co-investigator on the Fermi, Swift NuSTAR missions, and a member of the LIGO Scientific Collaboration. From 2012 to 2014, the SSU E/PO group developed an educator's guide for the NuSTAR mission.

Beginning in 2013, Cominsky, through what is now EdEon STEM Learning at Sonoma State University, initiated the development of Learning by Making (LbyM), an integrated, student-driven STEM curriculum for rural high school students, in partnership with SSU's Early Academic Outreach program. Learning by Making was the first in a sequence of three consecutive five-year projects funded by the U.S. Department of Education, aimed at improving STEM and computer science education outcomes for high-needs rural students in Northern California. The most recent phase of this work, known as STEMACES, represents the current incarnation of the program and continues to build on the curriculum, teacher support, and student engagement models established by LbyM.

As part of these initiatives, EdEon has provided extensive teacher professional development, offering approximately 80 hours of training annually since 2013 for educators implementing the Learning by Making curriculum. This training includes multi-day academic-year workshops and an intensive 40-hour summer institute hosted at Sonoma State University.

Cominsky has also served as Principal Investigator on the National Science Foundation–funded project “Teaching Einstein’s Universe at Community Colleges,” which developed an online professional learning course for lower-division physics instructors. The project focuses on strengthening instruction related to gravitational waves and the science of LIGO, while providing classroom-ready resources for calculus-based introductory physics courses.

Cominsky has been a member of many different advisory committees, including the Chandra User's Group, the Structure and Evolution of the Universe Subcommittee of NASA's Space Sciences Advisory Committee, and the LIGO Program Advisory Committee. She has served on the executive committees for the High Energy Astrophysics Division of the American Astronomical Society, and for the Division of Astrophysics of the American Physical Society.

For a decade, she was the deputy press officer for the American Astronomical Society, and she continues as the press officer for both the Fermi and Swift missions. In these positions, she often interprets astronomical discoveries to the public.

== Honors and awards ==
In 1993, Cominsky was named both SSU Outstanding Professor and California Professor of the Year by the Council for the Advancement and Support of Education (CASE). In 2008, Cominsky was named a Fellow of the California Council on Science and Technology, in 2009, she was named a Fellow of the American Physical Society (Education) and in 2013, she was named a Fellow of the American Association for the Advancement of Science (Astronomy). Recent awards include the 2014 Aerospace Awareness award from the Women in Aerospace professional organization, the 2015 Sally Ride Excellence in Education award from the American Astronautical Society and the 2016 Education prize from the American Astronomical Society. Additional awards include the 2016 Education Prize from the American Astronomical Society, the 2016 Wang Family Excellence Award from the California State University and the 2017 Frank J. Malina Astronautics Medal from the International Astronautical Federation. In 2019, she was selected as one of the first 200 Legacy Fellows named by the American Astronomical Society. She was also elected a Legacy Fellow of the American Astronomical Society in 2020. Cominsky has served as a Sigma Xi Distinguished Lecturer since 2023 and was elected a Fellow of Sigma Xi in 2024.
