= Ercoli =

Ercoli is a surname. Notable people with the surname include:

- Amalia Ercoli Finzi (born 1937), Italian astrophysicist
- Arturo Frondizi Ercoli (1908–1995), Argentine politician and lawyer
- Ercole Ercoli, nom de guerre of Palmiro Togliatti, Italian Communist politician (1893–1964)
- Gianmarco Ercoli (born 1995), Italian professional racing driver
- Luciano Ercoli (1929–2015), Italian film director
- Pat Ercoli (born 1957), Canadian soccer player
- Simone Ercoli (swimmer) (born 1979), Italian swimmer
- Simone Ercoli (tennis), Italian former tennis player
