= Roland Doré =

Roland Doré may refer to:

- Roland Doré (administrator), former president of the Canadian Space Agency
- Roland Doré (sculptor), 17th-century sculptor
