= René Pellat =

French astrophysicist (1936–2003)

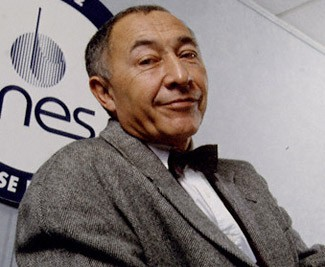

7th president of the French Space Agency
- In office 1992–1995
- Preceded by: Jacques-Louis Lions
- Succeeded by: André Lebeau

Personal details
- Born: 24 February 1936 Hussein Dey, Algiers
- Died: 4 August 2003 (aged 67) Royan, France
- Scientific career
- Education: École polytechnique CEA
- Workplaces: CEA; École polytechnique UCLA; CNES; ITER

René Pellat (24 February 1936 – 4 August 2003) was a French astrophysicist who co-founded modern plasma physics in France along with Guy Laval. He also headed major French national research agencies including the French Space Agency and the French National Centre for Scientific Research.

== Education and career ==
Pellat was in Hussein Dey in Algiers to parents who were both schoolteachers, the father Georges Guy René Pellat and the mother Alexandrine Deodatti, who got married in 1933. Pellat carried out his studies in Algeria until the preparatory classes at the Lycée Louis-le-Grand in Paris. He entered the École polytechnique in 1956. After his studies at the École Polytechnique, he joined the Corps des Ponts et Chaussées with the clear intention of engaging in research.

In 1962, he was connected to Guy Laval at the disposal of the French Alternative Energies and Atomic Energy Commission (CEA). These two young researchers would create a school of plasma physics, studying the very hot ionized gases that is essential to understanding the physics of stars or to one day be able to produce energy by controlled fusion. In 1967, Pellat defended a state thesis on the stability of Lagrangian systems. In 1972, he left the CEA to create a plasma theory group in the new laboratories of the École polytechnique, first in Paris, then in the new premises of Palaiseau. Detached from the Corps des Ponts et Chaussées, he then became a research fellow at the CNRS and a teacher at the École polytechnique. While contributing intensively to research on controlled fusion, his work gradually moved towards stellar physics and astrophysics. Pellat became an exceptional research director in 1986, the highest position within the CNRS.

From 1972 to 1982, Pellat was a lecturer in physics at the École polytechnique. During the 1980s until the early 1990s, he was scientific advisor (1982–1986), then president of the scientific council (1984–1986), and finally advisor in Science and Technology (1986–1992) to the director general of the French Space Agency (CNES). He was elected a corresponding member of the French Academy of Sciences in 1982. In 1987, he became a visiting professor at the University of California, Los Angeles in the Department of Astrophysics, where he became an official faculty member two years later. In 1989, he was appointed chairman of the board of directors of the CNRS. He also became a member of the CEA, the scientific council of the French National Institute of Health and Medical Research (INSERM), the Pasteur Institute, and the French Institute of Petroleum (IFP). In 1992, Pellat was appointed president of CNES, a position he held until early 1995. In 1996, he was appointed chairman of the High Scientific Council of the Office National d'Études et de Recherches Aérospatiales (ONERA). In 1998, Pellat becomes the High Commissioner for CEA with both civil and military responsibilities for the use of atomic energy. His position at the head of the CEA opens up the possibility for him to reorganize the ITER project and in particular to encourage the return of American participation.

In 2000, Pellat co-authored with economists Jean-Michel Charpin and Benjamin Dessus the report, Etude économique prospective de la filière électrique nucléaire (English: Economic Forecast Study of the Nuclear Power Option), which focused on the evolution of the French electricity system and the place of nuclear energy in France.

== Honors and distinctions ==
Pellat's contributions have been recognized with the honors of Officer of the Légion d'honneur and then Knight of the National Order of Merit and the Order of Gagarin. He has also received the CNRS Silver Medal and the Grand Prix Joannidès from the French Academy of Sciences. In 2002, Pellat was the sponsor of a class at the Economic Warfare School.

The René Pellat Prize was set up by the Société Française de Physique in 2011 to honor recent graduate students who made remarkable contributions to plasma physics. It is awarded annually.

== Personal life ==
Pellat had two daughters, Sophie and Catherine, with his first wife, Maryse Rocques. He had another two daughters, Anna and Marie, with his second wife Mireille Duler. Pellat died in 2003 while swimming near Royan on the west coast of France.
