= Simone Ercoli =

Simone Ercoli may refer to:

- Simone Ercoli (swimmer)
- Simone Ercoli (tennis)
