= NASA Education and Public Outreach Group =

Astronomy outreach group

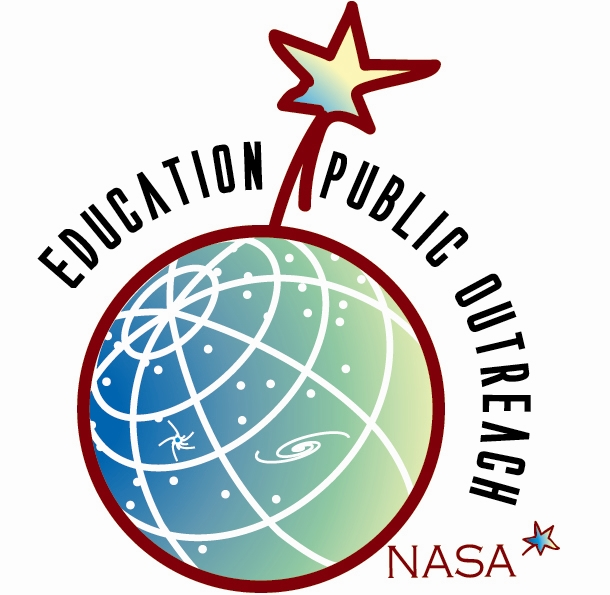
SSU NASA E/PO

NASA's Education and Public Outreach (E/PO) group at Sonoma State University, founded in 1999, is a provider of educational materials for students, educators, scientists, and the public. Funded by NASA and the United States Department of Education, employees work together to create educational guides, fact sheets, worksheets, posters, games, and informational websites. Most of these educational materials are related to the four major missions that support the group: Fermi Gamma-ray Space Telescope (formerly GLAST), Swift Gamma-Ray Burst Mission, XMM-Newton, and NuSTAR.

In addition to those four NASA missions, E/PO is also working an CanSat project for secondary school students and an online college cosmology course equivalent to a second year undergraduate astronomy course.

== Fermi ==
Fermi Gamma-ray Space Telescope is an international and multi-agency mission that was launched in 2008. The main Fermi E/PO website is: http://fermi.sonoma.edu/. Resources provided by SSU's NASA E/PO are:

- TOPS Educational Guides: "Far Out Math," "Scale the Universe," and "Pi in the Sky" are a series of TOPS Learning Systems activity books which introduce students to the science and technology of Fermi while at the same time teaching them basic mathematics and astronomy concepts.

Visit: "Far Out Math" at https://web.archive.org/web/20120827112514/http://www.topscience.org/books/farout_math43.html "Scale the Universe" at https://web.archive.org/web/20120827112701/http://www.topscience.org/books/scale_universe44.html "Pi in the Sky" at http://topscience.org/books/pi_sky45.html

- Active Galaxies Educational Unit: This is an educator's guide that includes a series of activities and a beautiful poster.

Visit: http://fermi.sonoma.edu/teachers/agn.php

- GTN: The Global Telescope Network is a consortium of small ground-based visible-light telescopes being used by amateur astronomers and high-school and college students to support gamma-ray observations with Fermi.

Visit: http://gtn.sonoma.edu/

- Fermi Race Game: Who will be the first to build, launch, and make observations with Fermi?

Visit: http://fermi.sonoma.edu/teachers/race.php

- Active Galaxy Pop-up Book: This short, innovative book for ages 8–12 has three separate activities, including a popup 3D galaxy showing its features, and the "Tasty Active Galaxy."

Visit: http://fermi.sonoma.edu/teachers/popup.php

- Black Hole Fact Sheet: Q&A about the top eight things everyone wants to

know about black holes. Visit: http://fermi.sonoma.edu/teachers/blackholes/index.php

== Swift ==
Swift is a NASA gamma-ray burst explorer satellite, launched on November 20, 2004. The main Swift E/PO website is: http://swift.sonoma.edu/ The resources provided by SSU's NASA E/PO are:

- Gamma-Ray Burst Website: This is a real-time map displaying GRB locations in the sky with additional information about ground-based follow-up and satellite observations.

Visit: http://grb.sonoma.edu/

- GEMS Guide: "Invisible Universe: the Electromagnetic Spectrum from Radio Waves to Gamma Rays." E/PO partnered with GEMS to create an activity book which uses the mystery of gamma-ray bursts to teach about the electromagnetic spectrum.

Visit: http://lhsgems.org/gemspubs.html

- Swift Satellite Model: This booklet contains all the instructions, drawings, and descriptions needed to build a paper model of the Swift satellite.

Visit: http://swift.sonoma.edu/education/index.html

- The Swift Glider: The Swift satellite is named for an agile bird that catches its food on the fly. This is a paper airplane designed to look like a Swift that you can build yourself. The kit comes with pre-printed heavy-duty colored paper, and assembly only takes a few minutes.

Visit: http://swift.sonoma.edu/education/index.html

- Newton's Laws of Motion: This is a set of four posters, one for each law of motion, and one for Newton's Law of Gravitation, with accompanying classroom activities. The activities were created to complement each other as an overall unit, in science and/or mathematics. Newly revised, these reprinted by the fall of 2007.

Visit: http://swift.sonoma.edu/education/index.html

== XMM-Newton ==
XMM-Newton is a European Space Agency X-ray spectroscopy observatory launched in December 1999. In 2003, SSU took the lead for the US portion of the E/PO program. The main XMM-Newton E/PO website is: http://xmm.sonoma.edu . Resources provided by SSU's NASA E/PO are:

- Space Place Black Hole Rescue: In this game, developed with partners at the Space Place, you must rescue words, one letter at a time, before they are pulled in by the powerful gravity of the black hole.

Visit: https://web.archive.org/web/20070707201742/http://spaceplace.jpl.nasa.gov/en/kids/blackhole/ Black Hole Rescue is also available in Spanish at: https://web.archive.org/web/20070628203619/http://spaceplace.jpl.nasa.gov/sp/kids/blackhole/index.shtml

- XMM-Newton Mission Ruler: This English/metric ruler showcases some of the X-ray images obtained using XMM-Newton, and provides descriptive captions on the reverse side.

Visit: http://xmm.sonoma.edu/edu/ruler.html

- Supernova Educator Unit: This is a set of formal activities and background materials about supernovae, with additional support from Fermi E/PO.

Visit: http://xmm.sonoma.edu/edu/supernova/index.html

- Dying Stars and the Birth of the Elements CLEA Lab: In this computer-based exercise, high school and college students analyze realistically simulated X-ray spectra of a supernova remnant and determine the abundances of various elements in it.

Visit: http://xmm.sonoma.edu/edu/clea/index.html

- Portable Planetarium Show: Still in the development phase, this will be an X-ray digital planetarium show designed to use in small portable planetaria.

Visit: http://xmm.sonoma.edu/edu/planetarium/index.html

== NuSTAR ==
NuSTAR is the Nuclear Spectroscopic Telescope Array which was launched in 2012. E/PO materials and resources for NuSTAR are forthcoming.

== EAs ==
Educator Ambassadors

- NASA E/PO coordinates the Astrophysics Educator Ambassador Program, consisting of 17 master educators who work with different NASA scientists and E/PO team members at SSU to develop and test workshops and curriculum materials, which are then distributed through the National Science Teacher's Association (NSTA), the California Science Teacher's Association (CSTA) and other regional, state and local conferences.

Visit: https://web.archive.org/web/20070630230944/http://epo.sonoma.edu/ambassadors/ to meet the Ambassadors, and to see the schedule of upcoming events.

== Space Mysteries ==
Space Mysteries are web-driven, inquiry-based games that are aligned to national science and mathematics standards. Students have fun while learning and trying to solve the original 3 mysteries which were sponsored by NASA's LEARNERS program: Alien Bandstand, Live! from 2-Alpha and Starmarket. The newest mystery - "Solar Supernova?" - was sponsored by GLAST E/PO and is now ready for you to play!

Visit:http://mystery.sonoma.edu/

== PBS ==
SSU's NASA GLAST E/PO was an important contributor to the PBS NOVA show "Monster of the Milky Way." Visit: https://www.pbs.org/wgbh/nova/blackhole/program.html to watch the movie.

== Other ==
SSU E/PO also helped to create the planetarium show "Black Holes: The Other Side of Infinity" directed by Thomas Lucas and produced in association with the Denver Museum of Nature & Science. For more information about the planetarium show, visit: http://www.spitzinc.com/fulldome_shows/index.html

== Works in Progress ==
- S4: SSU E/PO is developing a program called Small Satellites for Secondary Students (S4) that will integrate rocket and High-altitude balloon launches with student designed, non-militar/non-munition Payload (air and space craft) based on Bob Twiggs' CanSat design.
- Cosmology: In conjunction with Chicago State University and UNLV, SSU E/PO is designing an online full semester cosmology course complete with interactive apps and ebook.

== See also ==
- Aerospace Education Services Project
- Science outreach
