= GCE =

GCE can mean:

- Galactic Center GeV excess
- Gas Control Equipment, GCE Group, Sweden
- General Certificate of Education
- Global citizenship education
- Google Compute Engine
- Ground combat element in the United States Marine Corps
- Guthrie Corridor Expressway, an expressway in Malaysia
- Grand canonical ensemble in statistical physics
