= Pair-conversion =

High-energy gamma ray detector

In photonics, a pair-conversion instrument detects high-energy gamma rays by providing an environment—generally a thin foil of dense metal, commonly tungsten—in which they tend to generate electron-positron pairs, and then using standard particle physics techniques such as a microstrip detector to detect these particles.

Usually there are several stacks of conversion foils and particle detectors placed on top of one another, so that the electron-positron pairs can be tracked as they pass through consecutive detectors; and at the bottom of the stack one commonly finds a calorimeter capable of measuring the energy of the electron and the positron and inferring the energy of the incoming gamma ray.

An anticoincidence shield of some kind is needed so that charged particles entering the device from outside are not confused with electron-positron pairs generated in the conversion foils.

In gamma-ray astronomy, one of the larger operational pair-conversion telescopes is the Large Area Telescope on the Gamma-ray Large Area Space Telescope (GLAST). Space-based pair-conversion detectors tend to make for rather expensive missions, since they unavoidably contain several hundred kilograms of lead or tungsten.

has a slide illustrating the design of LAT.
