= Frank J. Malina Astronautics Medal =

International aerospace award

The Frank J. Malina Astronautics Medal is an annual award by the International Astronautical Federation (IAF). It was established in 1986 in memory of Frank Malina, an American aeronautical engineer who pioneered rocket propulsion research and helped establish the Jet Propulsion Laboratory. The medal is presented annually to an educator who has demonstrated excellence in promoting the study of astronautics and space sciences.

Each organization of the IAF may nominate a candidate each year, and candidates are reviewed by a committee during the annual spring meeting in Paris, France. Awards after 1996 have been conferred upon only one person. In total, 42 awards have been given granted to engineers, academics, astronauts, and scientists from 11 countries.

== List of recipients ==
- 1984: (Hungary) László Gazdag
- 1985: None
- 1986: (United States) Christa McAuliffe (posthumous)
- 1987: (Italy) Luigi G. Napolitano
- 1988: (France) André Lebeau
- 1989: None
- 1990: None
- 1991: (United States) Gerald M. Gregoreck
- 1992: (Russia) Oleg M. Alifanov
- 1992: (United States) Willy Sadeh
- 1993: (Germany) Hans H. Von Muldau
- 1994: (United States) Richard A. Seebass
- 1995: (United States) John L. Whitesides
- 1996: (United States) Julius E. Dash
- 1996: (Japan) Motocki Hinada
- 1997: (Ukraine) Vladimir V. Prisniakov
- 1997: (United States) Leroy S. Fletcher
- 1998: (India) Kiran Karnik
- 1999: (United States) John Junkins
- 2000: (Canada) Roland Doré
- 2001: (Italy) Carlo Buongiorno
- 2002: (United Kingdom) Martin Sweeting
- 2003: (United States) William A. Hisock
- 2004: (Ukraine) Eugene Dzhor
- 2005: (United States) G. P. "Bud" Peterson
- 2006: (Japan) Tetsuo Yasaka
- 2007: (United States) Peter M. Bainum
- 2008: (Australia) Anne Brumfitt
- 2009: (United States) Barbara Morgan
- 2010: (United States) Jean-Marie Wersinger
- 2011: (France) Yves Gourinat
- 2012: (Italy) Amalia Ercoli Finzi
- 2013: (United States) John Logsdon
- 2014: (United States) Bryan DeBates
- 2015: (Russia) Boris Pschenichner
- 2016: (France) Bénédicte Escudier
- 2017: (United States) Lynn Cominsky
- 2018: (United States) David B. Spencer
- 2019: (Japan) Mengu Cho
- 2020: (United States) Peter Martinez
- 2021: (Italy) Filippo Graziani
- 2022: (Japan) Shinichi Nakasuka
- 2023: (Germany) Klaus Schilling
- 2024: (United States) Bob Twiggs
- 2025: (Netherlands) Bernard Foing

== See also ==
- List of space technology awards
- List of engineering awards
- Prizes named after people
