= Amalia Ercoli Finzi =

Italian astrophysicist

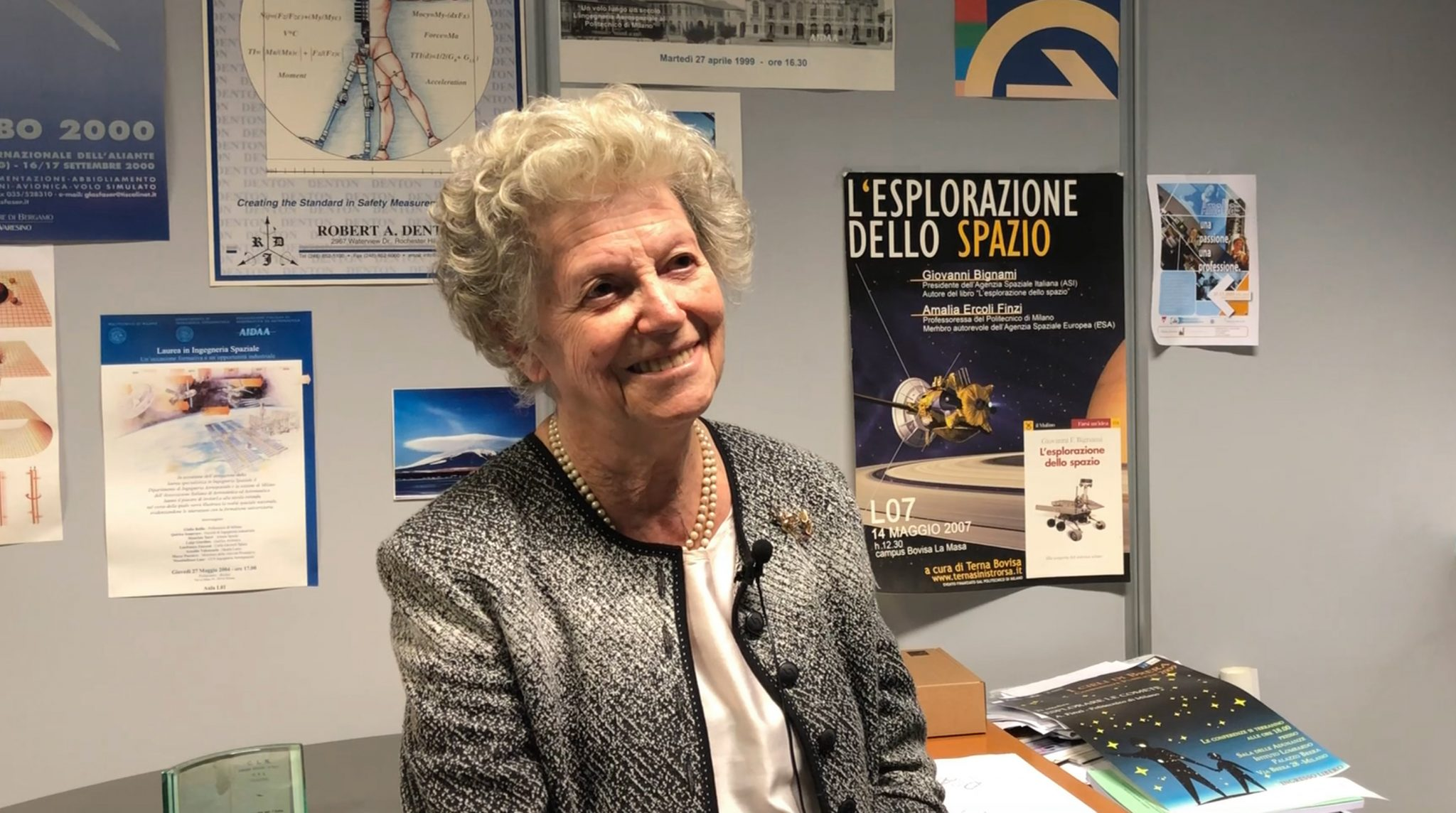
- Ercoli in late 2023
- Born: Amalia Ercoli; 20 April 1937 (age 89); Gallarate, Italy
- Occupations: Engineer; academic
- Known for: Philae
- Spouse: Filiberto Finzi
- Relatives: Bruno Finzi (father-in-law)

Academic background
- Education: Polytechnic University of Milan

Academic work
- Discipline: Aerospace engineering
- Institutions: Polytechnic University of Milan

Amalia Ercoli Finzi (Italian pronunciation: [aˈmaːlja ˈɛrkoli ˈfintsi]; née Ercoli; born 20 April 1937) is an Italian engineer and academic, Principal Investigator of the SD2 drill aboard the Philae spacecraft.

== Early life and education ==
Ercoli was born in Gallarate. In 1962, she was the first Italian woman to graduate in aeronautical engineering, from the Polytechnic University of Milan, with a final grade of 100/100 cum laude.

== Research and career ==
Ercoli has taught at the Polytechnic University of Milan for more than fifty years, becoming associate professor in 1980 and professor in 1994. She has served as Professor of Orbital Mechanics, Director of the Department of Aerospace Engineering and on the board of Directors of the National Museum of Science and Technology. She has considerable experience in space flight dynamics. She has served as a scientific advisor for NASA, ASI and ESA and is an honorary lecturer at Milan's Politecnico university.

She has been involved with several NASA–ASI missions, including space tether missions, MiTEx and Columbus (ISS module). She was responsible for the SD2 instrument, which drilled the surface of 67P/Churyumov–Gerasimenko, collected materials and took them for analysis.

== Personal life ==
Ercoli is married to Filiberto Finzi, son of Italian mathematician Bruno Finzi. The couple have five children.

== Awards and honors ==
In 2012 she won the Frank J. Malina Astronautics Medal from the International Astronautical Federation. She was also awarded the Leonardo Award for Lifetime Achievement from the Italian Association of Science Journalists for her contributions to the exploration of space and education. Ercoli is an advocate for women in science, and speaks up against stereotypes and bias. In 2017 she won the Premio Porto Venere Donna award which is given annually by the Provincial Council of Women to recognise the most influential women in Italy.

In 2018, the asteroid 24890 Amaliafinzi was named after her.

A Turin-based working copy of the latest Mars rover was named after Finzi in January 2022 by the European Space Agency. The model will simulate all the rover's actual moves on Mars.
