= Fermi Gamma-ray Space Telescope =

Space telescope for gamma-ray astronomy launched in 2008

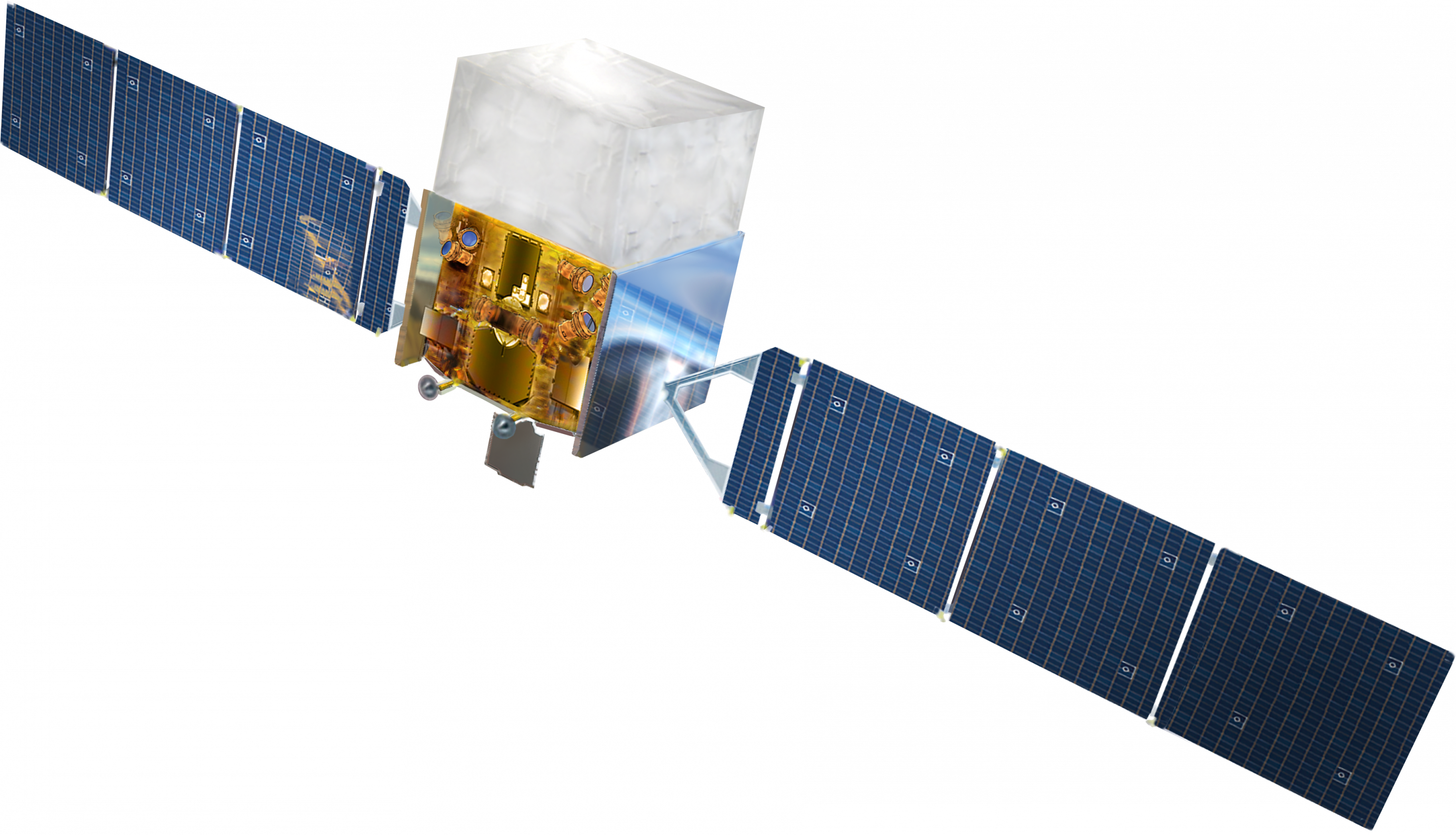
- Names: Gamma-ray Large Area Space Telescope
- Mission type: Gamma-ray astronomy
- Operator: NASA · U.S. Department of Energy
- COSPAR ID: 2008-029A
- SATCAT no.: 33053
- Website: Fermi.GSFC.NASA.gov
- Mission duration: Planned: 5-10 years Elapsed: 18 years, 4 months, 23 days

Spacecraft properties
- Manufacturer: General Dynamics
- Launch mass: 4,303 kg (9,487 lb)
- Dimensions: Stowed: 2.8 × 2.5 m (9.2 × 8.2 ft)
- Power: 1,500 W average

Start of mission
- Launch date: 11 June 2008, 16:05 UTC
- Rocket: Delta II 7920-H #333
- Launch site: Cape Canaveral SLC-17B
- Contractor: United Launch Alliance

Orbital parameters
- Reference system: Geocentric
- Regime: Low Earth
- Semi-major axis: 6,912.9 km (4,295.5 mi)
- Eccentricity: 0.001282
- Perigee altitude: 525.9 km (326.8 mi)
- Apogee altitude: 543.6 km (337.8 mi)
- Inclination: 25.58°
- Period: 95.33 min
- RAAN: 29.29°
- Argument of perigee: 131.16°
- Mean anomaly: 229.00°
- Mean motion: 15.10 rev/day
- Velocity: 7.59 km/s (4.72 mi/s)
- Epoch: 23 February 2016, 04:46:22 UTC
Instruments
- GBM: Gamma-ray Burst Monitor
- LAT: Large Area Telescope

The Fermi Gamma-ray Space Telescope (FGST, also FGRST), formerly called the Gamma-ray Large Area Space Telescope (GLAST), is a space observatory being used to perform gamma-ray astronomy observations from low Earth orbit. Its main instrument is the Large Area Telescope (LAT), with which astronomers mostly intend to perform an all-sky survey studying astrophysical and cosmological phenomena such as active galactic nuclei, pulsars, other high-energy sources and dark matter. Another instrument aboard Fermi, the Gamma-ray Burst Monitor (GBM; formerly GLAST Burst Monitor), is being used to study gamma-ray bursts and solar flares.

Fermi, named for high-energy physics pioneer Enrico Fermi, was launched on 11 June 2008 at 16:05 UTC aboard a Delta II 7920-H rocket. The mission is a joint venture of NASA, the United States Department of Energy, and government agencies in France, Germany, Italy, Japan, and Sweden, becoming the most sensitive gamma-ray telescope on orbit, succeeding INTEGRAL. The project is a recognized CERN experiment (RE7).

== Overview ==
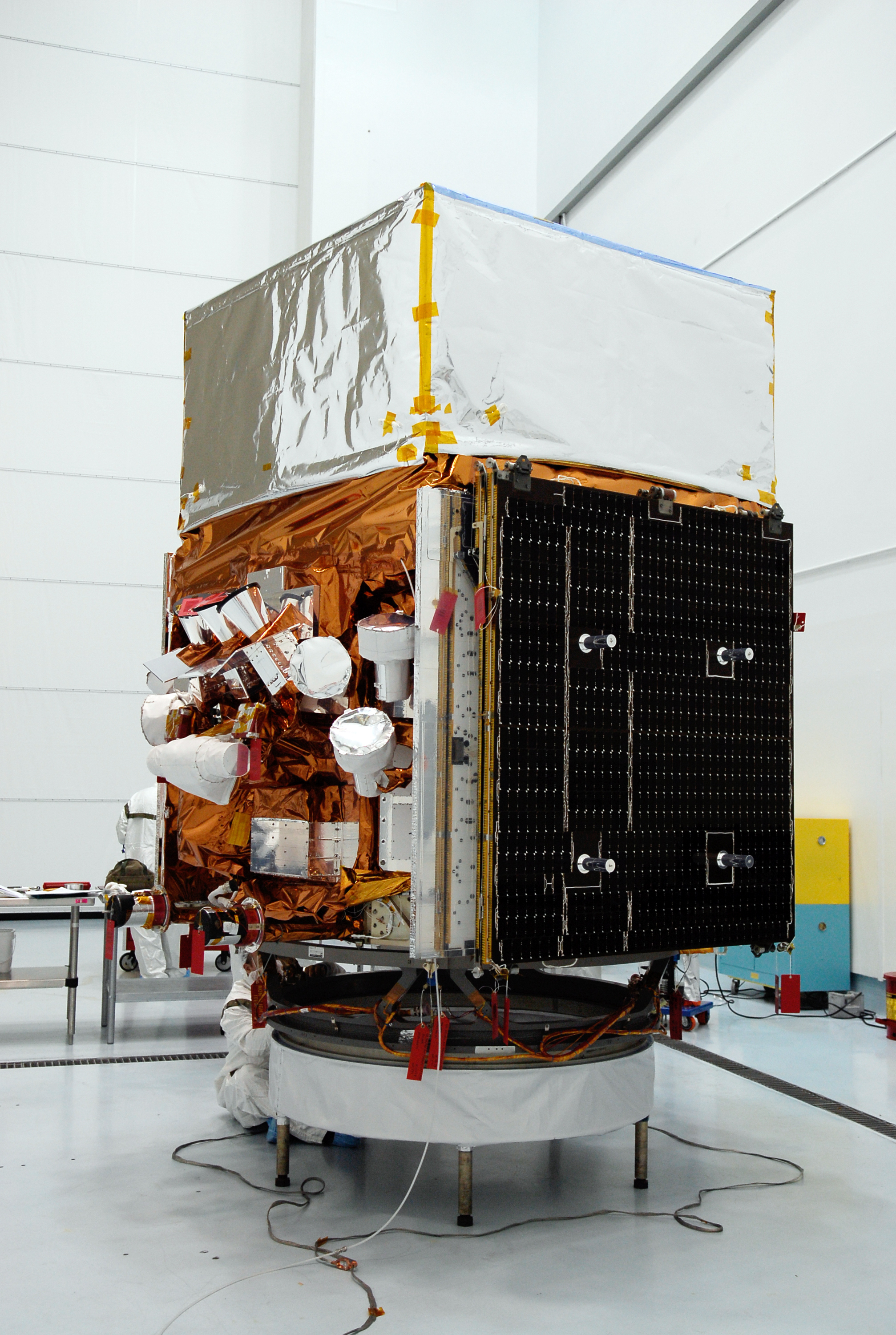
Fermi on Earth, with solar arrays folded

Fermi includes two scientific instruments, the Large Area Telescope (LAT) and the Gamma-ray Burst Monitor (GBM).

- The LAT is an imaging gamma-ray detector (a pair-conversion instrument) which detects photons with energy from about 20 million to about 300 billion electronvolts (20 MeV to 300 GeV), with a field of view of about 20% of the sky; it may be thought of as a sequel to the EGRET instrument on the Compton Gamma Ray Observatory.
- The GBM consists of 14 scintillation detectors (twelve sodium iodide crystals for the 8 keV to 1 MeV range and two bismuth germanate crystals with sensitivity from 150 keV to 30 MeV), and can detect gamma-ray bursts in that energy range across the whole of the sky not occluded by the Earth.

General Dynamics Advanced Information Systems (formerly Spectrum Astro and now Orbital Sciences) in Gilbert, Arizona, designed and built the spacecraft that carries the instruments. It travels in a low, circular orbit with a period of about 95 minutes. Its normal mode of operation maintains its orientation so that the instruments will look away from the Earth, with a "rocking" motion to equalize the coverage of the sky. The view of the instruments will sweep out across most of the sky about 16 times per day. The spacecraft can also maintain an orientation that points to a chosen target.

Both science instruments underwent environmental testing, including vibration, vacuum, and high and low temperatures to ensure that they can withstand the stresses of launch and continue to operate in space. They were integrated with the spacecraft at the General Dynamics ASCENT facility in Gilbert, Arizona.

Data from the instruments are available to the public through the Fermi Science Support Center web site. Software for analyzing the data is also available.

== GLAST renamed Fermi Gamma-ray Space Telescope ==
NASA's Alan Stern, associate administrator for Science at NASA Headquarters, launched a public competition 7 February 2008, closing 31 March 2008, to rename GLAST in a way that would "capture the excitement of GLAST's mission and call attention to gamma-ray and high-energy astronomy ... something memorable to commemorate this spectacular new astronomy mission ... a name that is catchy, easy to say and will help make the satellite and its mission a topic of dinner table and classroom discussion".

Fermi gained its new name in 2008: On 26 August 2008, GLAST was renamed the "Fermi Gamma-ray Space Telescope" in honor of Enrico Fermi, a pioneer in high-energy physics.

== Mission ==
Video: What is Fermi?

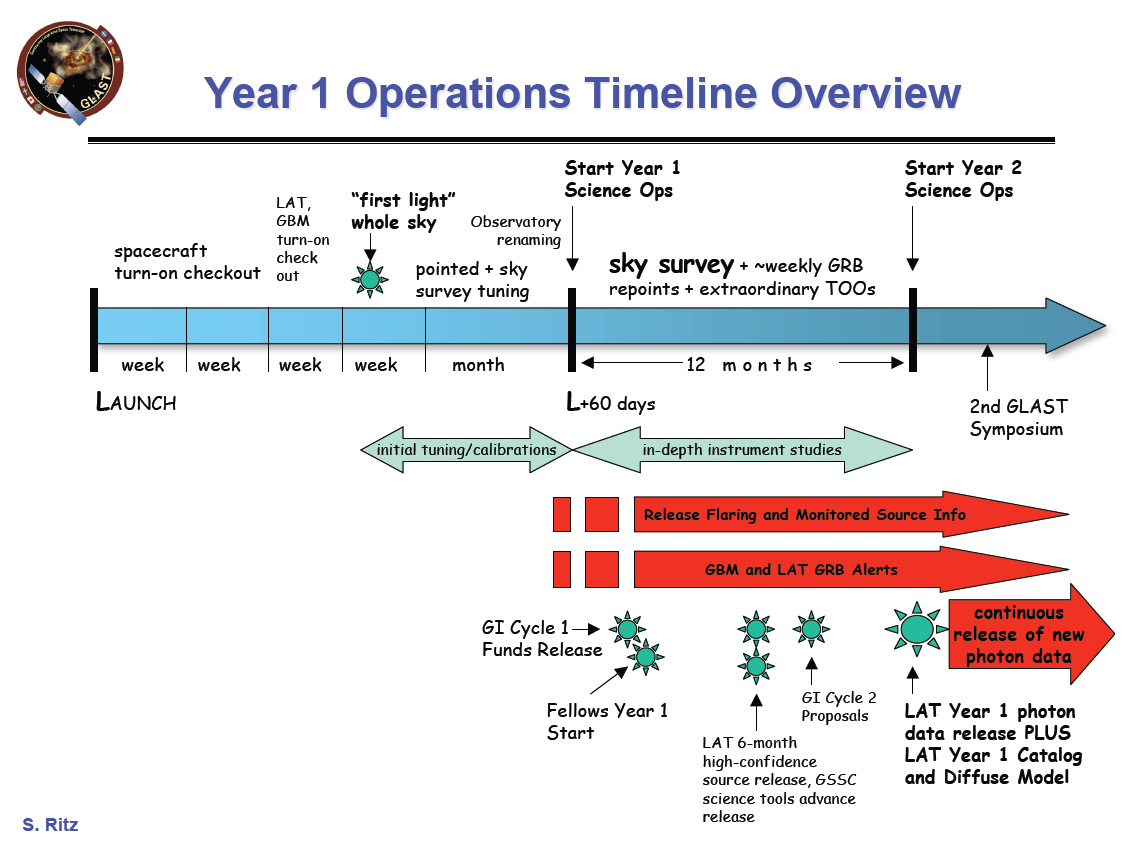
Anticipated first year of operations timeline

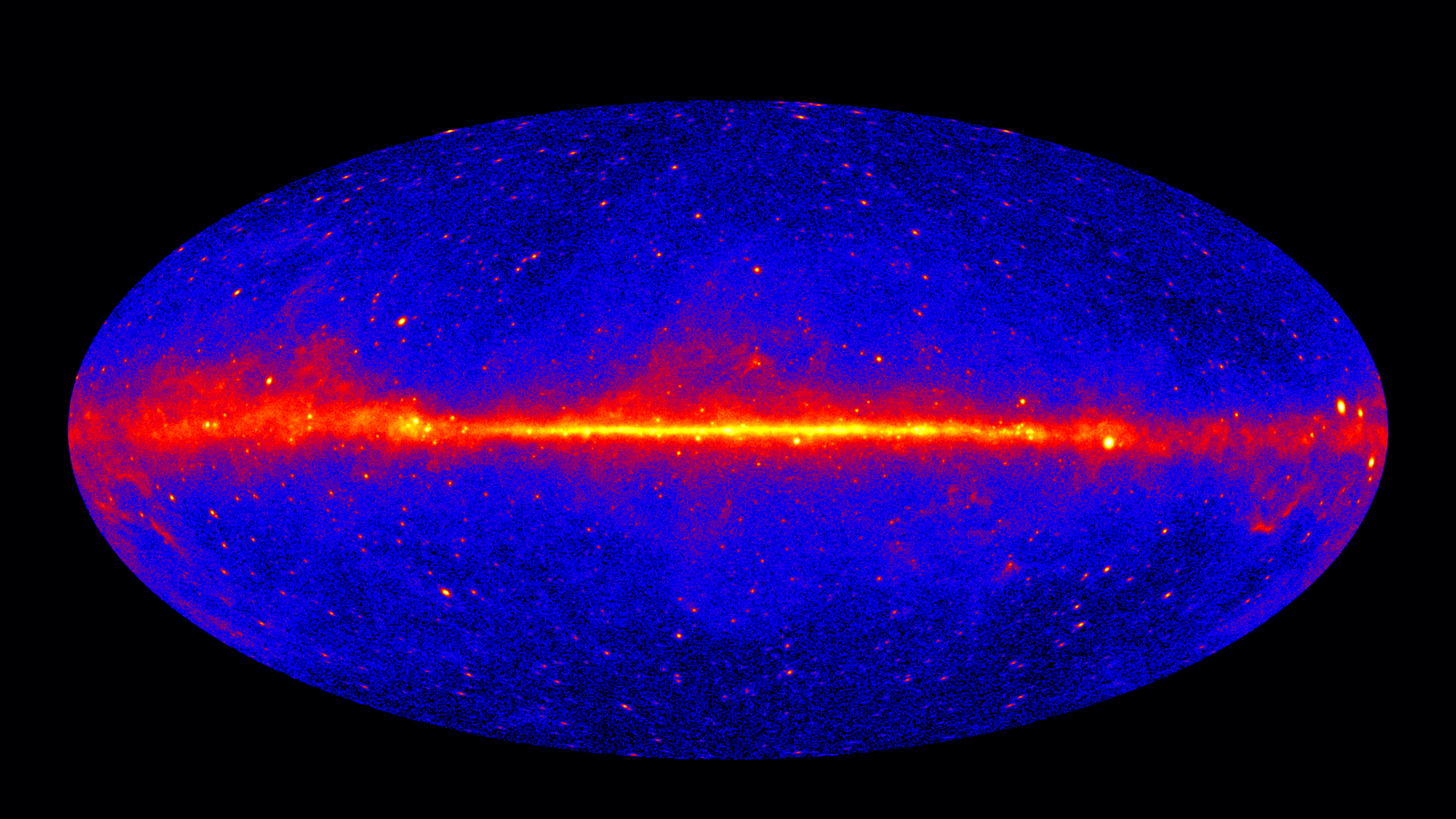
Gamma-ray radiation (greater than 1 Gev) detected over the entire sky; brighter areas are more radiation (five year study by Fermi: 2009–2013)

NASA designed the mission with a five-year lifetime, with a goal of ten years of operations.

The key scientific objectives of the Fermi mission have been described as:

- To understand the mechanisms of particle acceleration in active galactic nuclei (AGN), pulsars, and supernova remnants (SNR).
- Resolve the gamma-ray sky: unidentified sources and diffuse emission.
- Determine the high-energy behavior of gamma-ray bursts and transients.
- Probe dark matter (e.g. by looking for an excess of gamma rays from the center of the Milky Way) and early Universe.
- Search for evaporating primordial micro black holes (MBH) from their presumed gamma burst signatures (Hawking Radiation component).

The National Academies of Sciences ranked this mission as a top priority. New possibilities and discoveries are anticipated to emerge from this single mission and expand the view of the Universe.

- Blazars and active galaxies

Study energy spectra and variability of wavelengths of light coming from blazars so as to determine the composition of the black hole jets aimed directly at Earth -- whether they are

(a) a combination of electrons and positrons or
(b) only protons.

- Gamma-ray bursts

Study gamma-ray bursts with an energy range several times more intense than ever before so that scientists may be able to understand them better.

- Neutron stars

Study younger, more energetic pulsars in the Milky Way than ever before so as to broaden our understanding of stars. Study the pulsed emissions of magnetospheres so as to possibly solve how they are produced. Study how pulsars generate winds of interstellar particles.

- Milky Way galaxy

Provide new data to help improve upon existing theoretical models of our own galaxy.

- Gamma-ray background radiation

Study better than ever before whether ordinary galaxies are responsible for gamma-ray background radiation. The potential for a tremendous discovery awaits if ordinary sources are determined to be irresponsible, in which case the cause may be anything from self-annihilating dark matter to entirely new chain reactions among interstellar particles that have yet to be conceived.

- The early universe

Study better than ever before how concentrations of visible and ultraviolet light change over time. The mission should easily detect regions of spacetime where gamma-rays interacted with visible or UV light to make matter. This can be seen as an example of E=mc^{2} working in reverse, where energy is converted into mass, in the early universe.

- Sun

Study better than ever before how our own Sun produces gamma rays in solar flares.

- Dark matter

Search for evidence that dark matter is made up of weakly interacting massive particles, complementing similar experiments already planned for the Large Hadron Collider as well as other underground detectors. The potential for a tremendous discovery in this area is possible over the next several years.

- Fundamental physics

Test better than ever before certain established theories of physics, such as whether the speed of light in vacuum remains constant regardless of wavelength. Einstein's general theory of relativity contends that it does, yet some models in quantum mechanics and quantum gravity predict that it may not. Search for gamma rays emanating from former black holes that once exploded, providing yet another potential step toward the unification of quantum mechanics and general relativity. Determine whether photons naturally split into smaller photons, as predicted by quantum mechanics and already achieved under controlled, man-made experimental conditions.

- Unknown discoveries

Scientists estimate a very high possibility for new scientific discoveries, even revolutionary discoveries, emerging from this single mission.

== Mission timeline ==
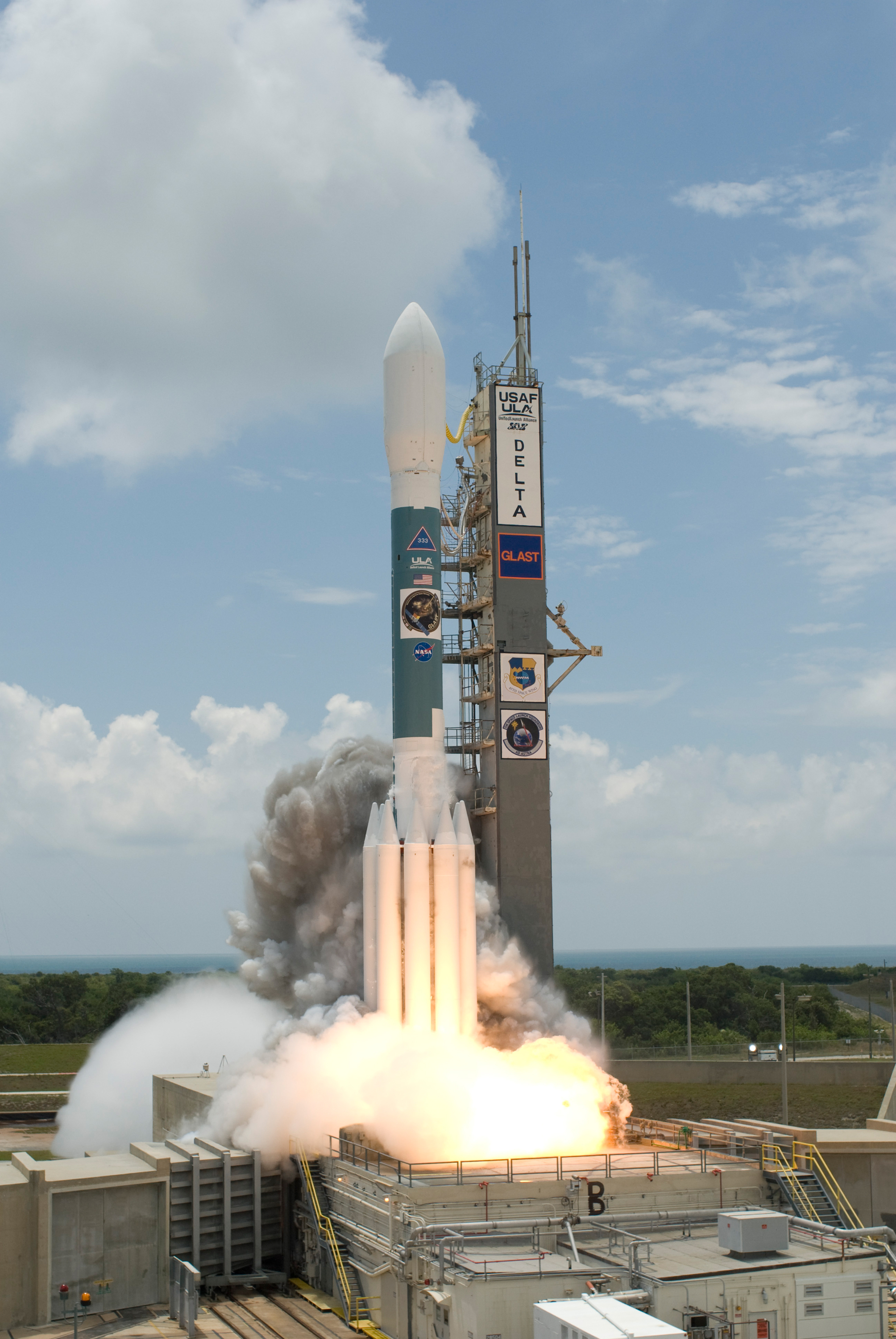
GLAST launch aboard a Delta II rocket, 11 June 2008

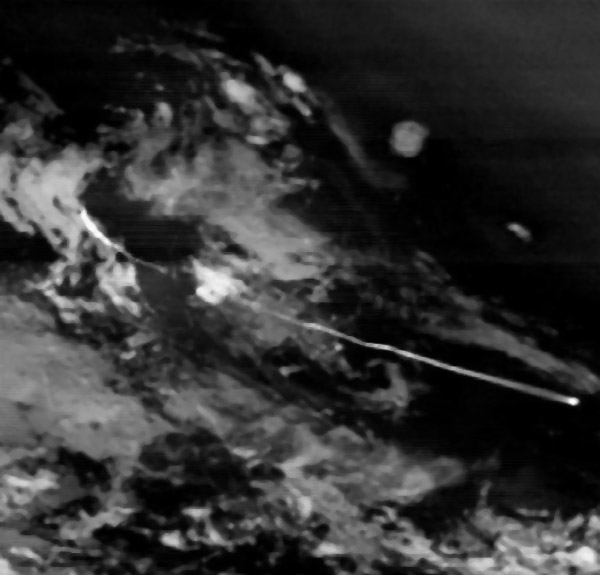
GLAST launch as pictured by a space-based infrared sensor, looking down at the Earth

=== Prelaunch ===
On 4 March 2008, the spacecraft arrived at the Astrotech payload processing facility in Titusville, Florida. On 4 June 2008, after several previous delays, launch status was retargeted for 11 June at the earliest, the last delays resulting from the need to replace the Flight Termination System batteries. The launch window extended from 15:45 to 17:40 UTC daily, until 7 August 2008.

=== Launch ===
Launch occurred successfully on 11 June 2008 at 16:05 UTC aboard a Delta 7920H-10C rocket from Cape Canaveral Air Force Station Space Launch Complex 17-B. Spacecraft separation took place about 75 minutes after launch.

=== Orbit ===
Fermi resides in a low-Earth circular orbit at an altitude of 550 km (340 mi), and at an inclination of 28.5 degrees.

=== Software modifications ===
GLAST received some minor modifications to its computer software on 23 June 2008.

=== LAT/GBM computers operational ===
Computers operating both the LAT and GBM and most of the LAT's components were turned on 24 June 2008. The LAT high voltage was turned on 25 June, and it began detecting high-energy particles from space, but minor adjustments were still needed to calibrate the instrument. The GBM high voltage was also turned on 25 June, but the GBM still required one more week of testing/calibrations before searching for gamma-ray bursts.

=== Sky survey mode ===
After presenting an overview of the Fermi instrumentation and goals, Jennifer Carson of SLAC National Accelerator Laboratory had concluded that the primary goals were "all achievable with the all-sky scanning mode of observing". Fermi switched to "sky survey mode" on 26 June 2008 so as to begin sweeping its field of view over the entire sky every three hours (every two orbits).

=== Collision avoided ===
On 30 April 2013, NASA revealed that the telescope had narrowly avoided a collision a year earlier with a defunct Cold War-era Soviet spy satellite, Kosmos 1805, in April 2012. Orbital predictions several days earlier indicated that the two satellites were expected to occupy the same point in space within 30 milliseconds of each other. On 3 April, telescope operators decided to stow the satellite's high-gain parabolic antenna, rotate the solar panels out of the way and to fire Fermi's rocket thrusters for one second to move it out of the way. Even though the thrusters had been idle since the telescope had been placed in orbit nearly five years earlier, they worked correctly and potential disaster was thus avoided.

=== Extended mission 2013–2018 ===
In August 2013 Fermi started its 5-year mission extension.

=== Pass 8 software upgrade ===
Comparison of two Fermi LAT views of the same region in the constellation Carina. The first comes from an older analysis, termed Pass 7, while the second shows the improvements with Pass 8. Both images contain the same number of gamma rays. In the foreground plot, the tall spikes represent greater concentrations of gamma rays and correspond to brightness. Pass 8 provides more accurate directions for incoming gamma rays, so more of them fall closer to their sources, creating taller spikes and a sharper image.

In June 2015, the Fermi LAT Collaboration released "Pass 8 LAT data". Iterations of the analysis framework used by LAT are called "passes" and at launch Fermi LAT data was analyzed using Pass 6. Significant improvements to Pass 6 were included in Pass 7 which debuted in August 2011.

Every detection by the Fermi LAT since its launch, was reexamined with the latest tools to learn how the LAT detector responded to both each event and to the background. This improved understanding led to two major improvements: gamma-rays that had been missed by previous analysis were detected and the direction they arrived from was determined with greater accuracy. The impact of the latter is to sharpen Fermi LAT's vision as illustrated in the figure on the right. Pass 8 also delivers better energy measurements and a significantly increased effective area. The entire mission dataset was reprocessed.

These improvements have the greatest impact on both the low and high ends of the range of energy Fermi LAT can detect - in effect expanding the energy range within which LAT can make useful observations. The improvement in the performance of Fermi LAT due to Pass 8 is so dramatic that this software update is sometimes called the cheapest satellite upgrade in history. Among numerous advances, it allowed for a better search for Galactic spectral lines from dark matter interactions, analysis of extended supernova remnants, and to search for extended sources in the Galactic plane.

For almost all event classes, Version P8R2 had a residual background that was not fully isotropic. This anisotropy was traced to cosmic-ray electrons leaking through the ribbons of the Anti-Coincidence Detector and a set of cuts allowed rejection of these events while minimally impacting acceptance. This selection was used to create the P8R3 version of LAT data.

=== Solar array drive failure ===
On 16 March 2018 one of Fermi's solar arrays quit rotating, prompting a transition to "safe hold" mode and instrument power off. Fermi's solar arrays include a motor that rotates the arrays to maximize the exposure of the arrays to the Sun. After an investigation it was determined that the motor that drove this rotation ceased working. On 27 March, the satellite was placed at a fixed angle relative to its orbit to maximize solar power. The next day the GBM instrument was turned back on.

On 2 April, operators turned LAT on and it resumed operations on 8 April. Alternative observation strategies were developed to continue data collection in the face of changed power and thermal requirements. As a result of the failure the satellite operates almost exclusively in "survey mode" now. Before the failure it would often use autonomous repointing to monitor the location of a GRB.

This was the first mechanical failure in nearly 10 years.

=== LAT outages ===
Starting in 2018, LAT suffered occasional outages lasting between a few hours and several days.

=== Requested cancellation ===
As part of the President's Fiscal Year 2026 Budget Request, President Trump requested the cancellation of the Fermi mission and zeroed out its budget starting in the 2026 year "given higher priorities within the agency", however it was fully funded for the year. In his 2027 budget request, Trump again zeroed out the program.

== Discoveries ==
A cycle of pulsed gamma rays from the Vela Pulsar, constructed from photons detected by LAT

=== Pulsar discovery ===
The first major discovery came when the space telescope detected a pulsar in the CTA 1 supernova remnant that appeared to emit radiation in the gamma ray bands only, the first of its kind. This new pulsar sweeps the Earth every 316.86 milliseconds and is about 4,600 light-years away.

=== Greatest gamma-ray burst energy release ===
In September 2008, the gamma-ray burst GRB 080916C in the constellation Carina was recorded by the Fermi telescope. This burst is notable as having "the largest apparent energy release yet measured". The explosion had the power of about 9,000 ordinary supernovae, and the relativistic jet of material ejected in the blast must have moved at a minimum of 99.9999% the speed of light. Overall, GRB 080916C had "the greatest total energy, the fastest motions, and the highest initial-energy emissions" ever seen.

=== Galactic Center gamma ray excess ===
In 2009, a surplus of gamma rays from a spherical region around the Galactic Center of the Milky Way was found in data from the Fermi telescope. This is now known as the Galactic Center GeV excess. The source of this surplus is not known. Suggestions include self-annihilation of dark matter or a population of pulsars.

=== Cosmic rays and supernova remnants ===
In February 2010, it was announced that Fermi-LAT had determined that supernova remnants act as enormous accelerators for cosmic particles. This determination fulfills one of the stated missions for this project.

=== Background gamma ray sources ===
In March 2010 it was announced that active galactic nuclei are not responsible for most gamma-ray background radiation. Though active galactic nuclei do produce some of the gamma-ray radiation detected here on Earth, less than 30% originates from these sources. The search now is to locate the sources for the remaining 70% or so of all gamma-rays detected. Possibilities include star forming galaxies, galactic mergers, and yet-to-be explained dark matter interactions.

=== Milky Way Gamma- and X-ray emitting Fermi bubbles ===
Galactic gamma- and X-ray bubbles
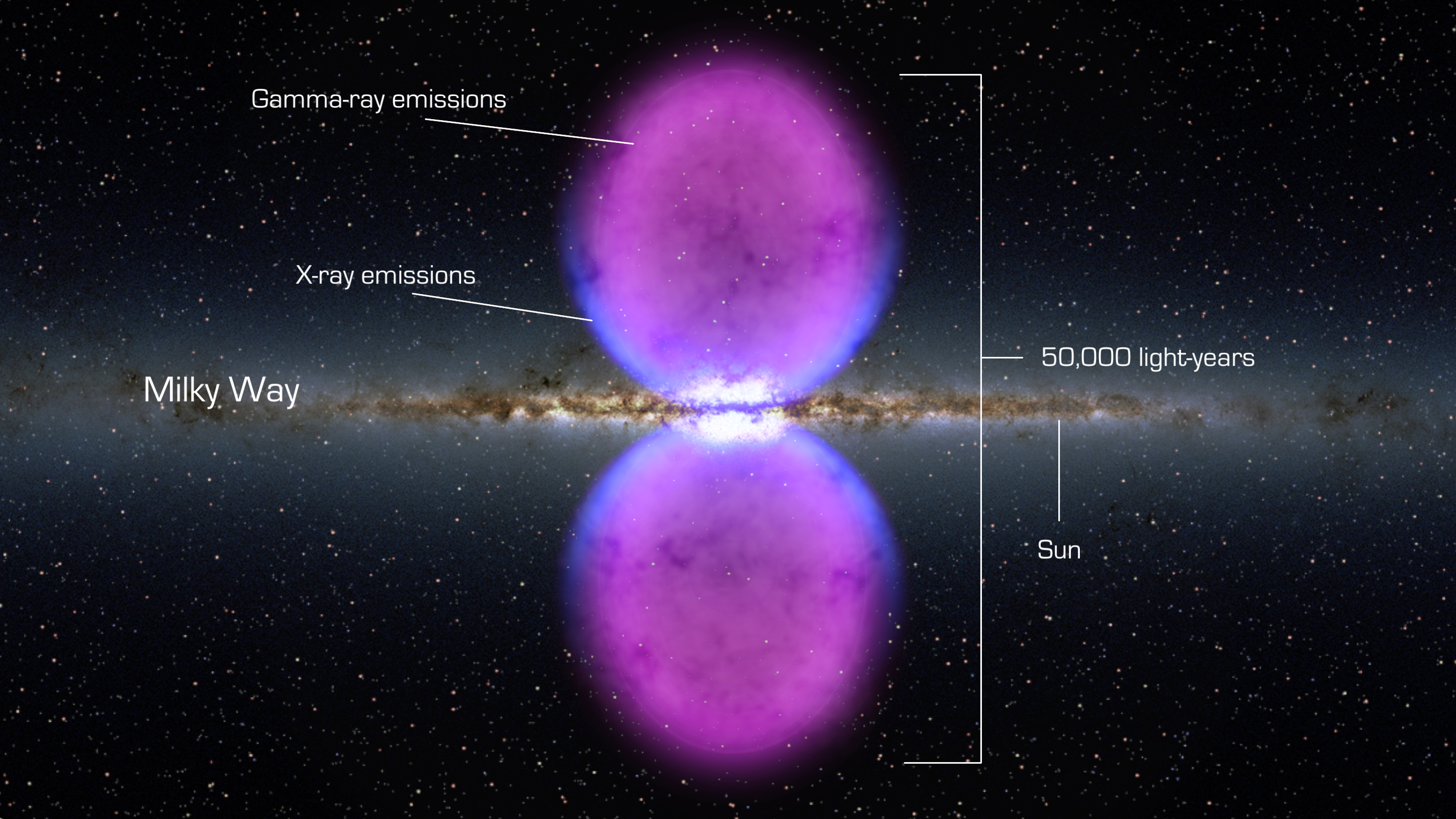
Gamma- and X-ray bubbles at the Milky Way galaxy center: Top: illustration; Bottom: video.

In November 2010, it was announced that two gamma-ray and X-ray emitting bubbles were detected around our galaxy, the Milky Way. The bubbles, named Fermi bubbles, extend about 25 thousand light-years distant above and below the galactic center. The galaxy's diffuse gamma-ray fog hampered prior observations, but the discovery team led by D. Finkbeiner, building on research by G. Dobler, worked around this problem.

=== Highest energy light ever seen from the Sun ===
In early 2012, Fermi/GLAST observed the highest energy light ever seen in a solar eruption.

At the flare's peak, the LAT detected gamma rays with two billion times the energy of visible light, or about four billion electron volts (GeV), easily setting a record for the highest-energy light ever detected during or immediately after a solar flare

— NASA

=== Terrestrial gamma-ray flash observations ===
Fermi telescope has observed and detected numerous terrestrial gamma-ray flashes and discovered that such flashes can produce 100 trillion positrons, far more than scientists had previously expected.

=== GRB 130427A ===
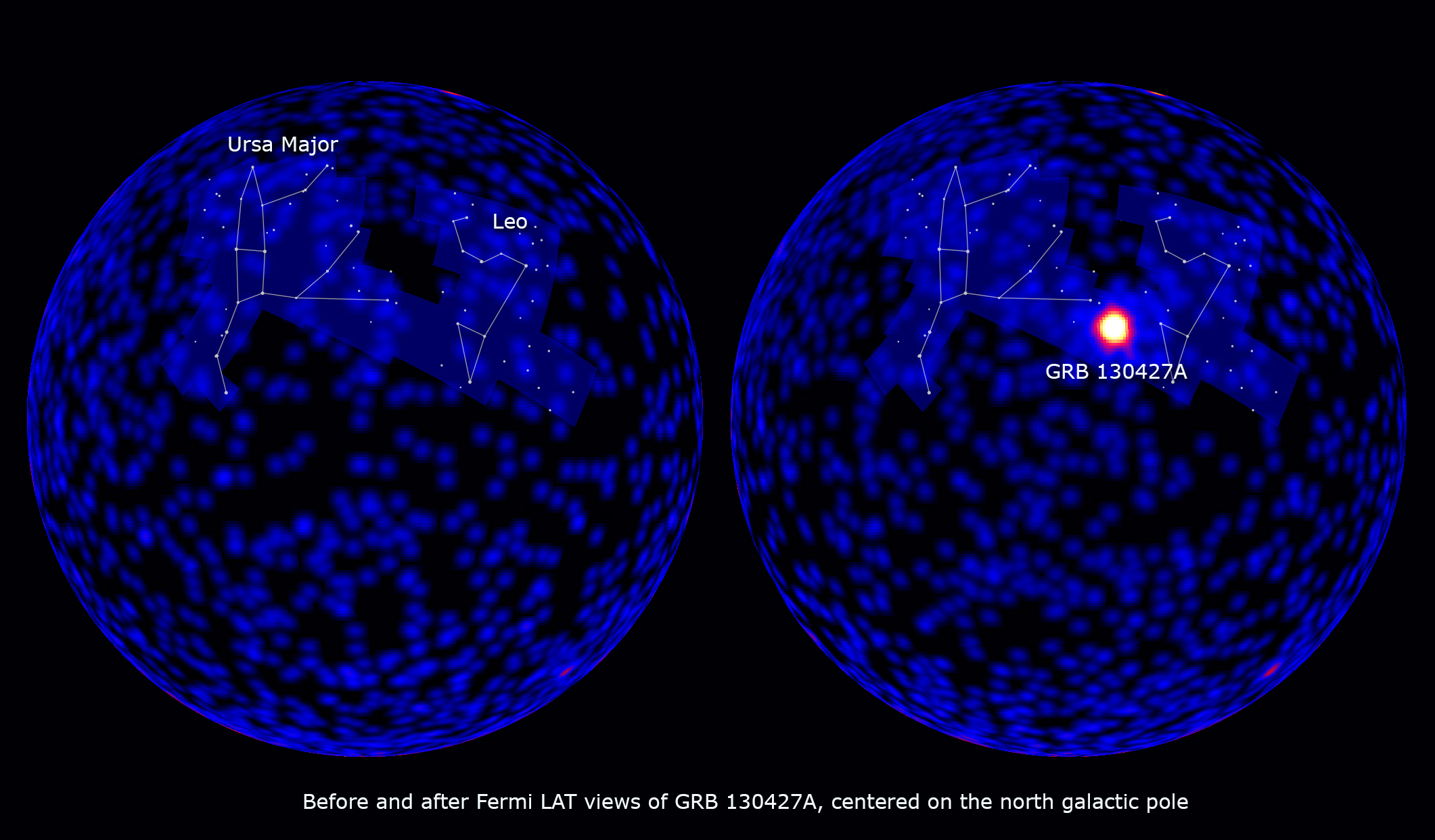
GRB 130427A before and after in more than 100 MeV light

On 27 April 2013, Fermi detected GRB 130427A, a gamma-ray burst with one of the highest energy outputs yet recorded. This included detection of a gamma-ray over 94 billion electron volts (GeV). This broke Fermi's previous record detection, by over three times the amount.

Gamma-ray sky's activity during a year of observations from February 2022 to February 2023 captured by the Large Area Telescope (LAT) aboard Fermi Gamma-ray Space Telescope. The pulsing circles represent a subset of the light curves.

=== GRB coincident with gravitational wave event GW150914 ===
Fermi reported that its GBM instrument detected a weak gamma-ray burst above 50 keV, starting 0.4 seconds after the LIGO event and with a positional uncertainty region overlapping that of the LIGO observation. The Fermi team calculated the odds of such an event being the result of a coincidence or noise at 0.22%.

However, observations from the INTEGRAL telescope's all-sky SPI-ACS instrument indicated that any energy emission in gamma-rays and hard X-rays from the event was less than one millionth of the energy emitted as gravitational waves, concluding that "this limit excludes the possibility that the event is associated with substantial gamma-ray radiation, directed towards the observer." If the signal observed by the Fermi GBM was associated with GW150914, SPI-ACS would have detected it with a significance of 15 sigma above the background.

The AGILE space telescope also did not detect a gamma-ray counterpart of the event. A follow-up analysis of the Fermi report by an independent group, released in June 2016, purported to identify statistical flaws in the initial analysis, concluding that the observation was consistent with a statistical fluctuation or an Earth albedo transient on a 1-second timescale.

A rebuttal of this follow-up analysis, pointed out that the independent group misrepresented the analysis of the original Fermi GBM Team paper and therefore misconstrued the results of the original analysis. The rebuttal reaffirmed that the false coincidence probability is calculated empirically and is not refuted by the independent analysis.

In October 2018, astronomers reported that GRB 150101B, 1.7 billion light years away from Earth, may be analogous to the historic GW170817. It was detected on 1 January 2015 at 15:23:35 UT by the Gamma-ray Burst Monitor on board the Fermi Gamma-ray Space Telescope, along with detections by the Burst Alert Telescope (BAT) on board the Swift Observatory Satellite.

Black hole mergers of the type thought to have produced the gravitational wave event are not expected to produce gamma-ray bursts, as stellar-mass black hole binaries are not expected to have large amounts of orbiting matter. Avi Loeb has theorised that if a massive star is rapidly rotating, the centrifugal force produced during its collapse will lead to the formation of a rotating bar that breaks into two dense clumps of matter with a dumbbell configuration that becomes a black hole binary, and at the end of the star's collapse it triggers a gamma-ray burst. Loeb suggests that the 0.4 second delay is the time it took the gamma-ray burst to cross the star, relative to the gravitational waves.

=== GRB 170817A signals a multi-messenger transient ===
On 17 August 2017, Fermi Gamma-Ray Burst Monitor software detected, classified, and localized a gamma-ray burst which was later designated as GRB 170817A. Six minutes later, a single detector at Hanford LIGO registered a gravitational-wave candidate which was consistent with a binary neutron star merger, occurring 2 seconds before the GRB 170817A event. This observation was "the first joint detection of gravitational and electromagnetic radiation from a single source".

== Instruments ==
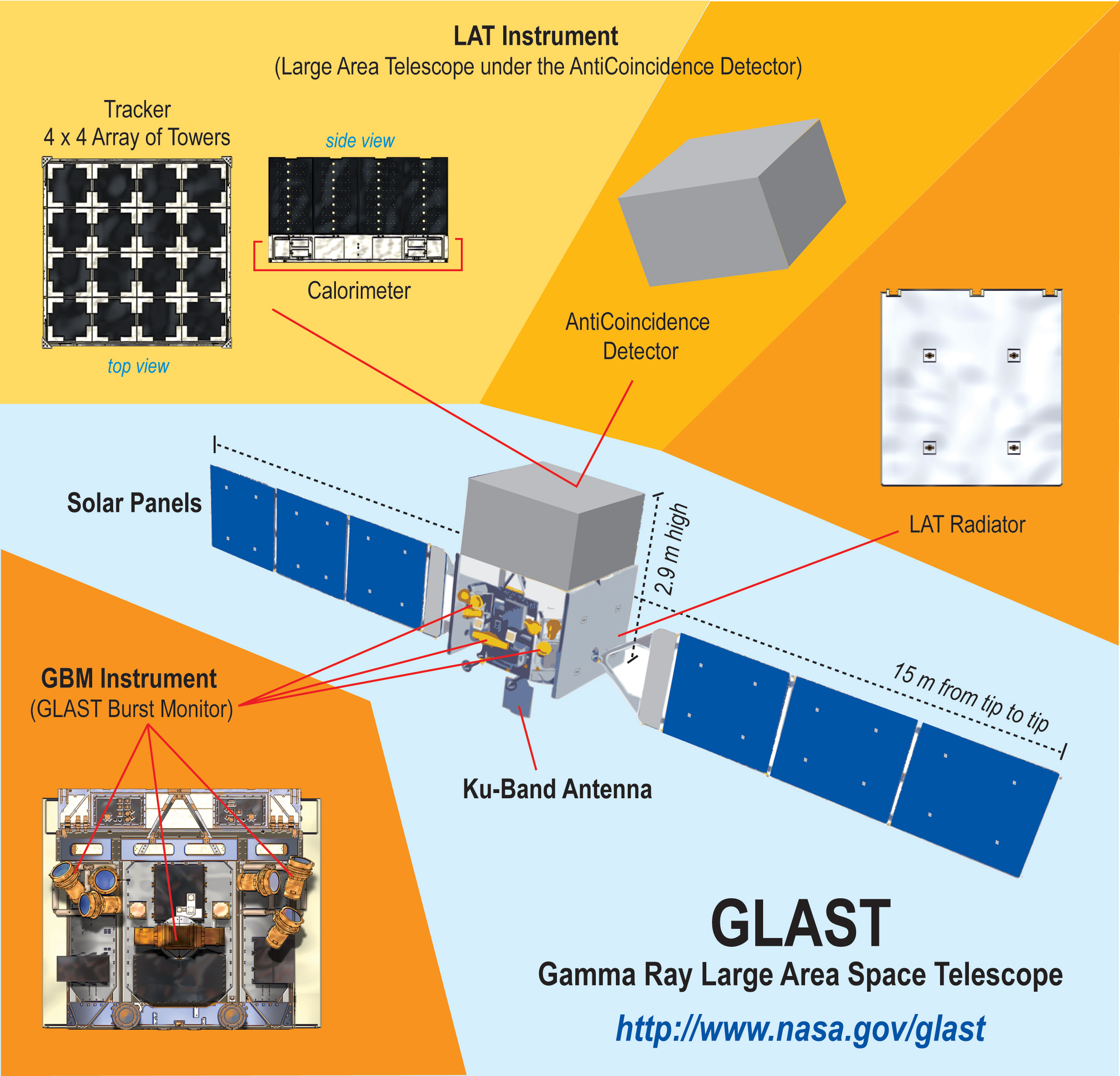
Instruments on-board Fermi

Fermi is sensitive from 8 keV, a medium X-ray, to 300 GeV, a very-high-energy gamma ray

=== Gamma-ray Burst Monitor ===
The Gamma-ray Burst Monitor (GBM) (formerly GLAST Burst Monitor) detects sudden flares of gamma-rays produced by gamma ray bursts and solar flares. Its scintillators are on the sides of the spacecraft to view all of the sky which is not blocked by the Earth. The design is optimized for good resolution in time and photon energy, and is sensitive from 8 keV (a medium X-ray) to 40 MeV (a medium-energy gamma-ray).

"Gamma-ray bursts are so bright we can see them from billions of light-years away, which means they occurred billions of years ago, and we see them as they looked then", stated Charles Meegan of NASA's Marshall Space Flight Center.

The Gamma-ray Burst Monitor has detected gamma rays from positrons generated in powerful thunderstorms.

=== Large Area Telescope ===
The Large Area Telescope (LAT) detects individual gamma rays using technology similar to that used in terrestrial particle accelerators. Photons hit thin metal sheets, specifically tungsten in this case, converting to electron-positron pairs, via a process termed pair production. These charged particles pass through interleaved layers of silicon microstrip detectors, causing ionization which produce detectable tiny pulses of electric charge. Researchers can combine information from several layers of this tracker to determine the path of the particles.

After passing through the tracker, the particles enter the calorimeter, which consists of a stack of caesium iodide scintillator crystals to measure the total energy of the particles. The LAT's field of view is large, about 20% of the sky. The resolution of its images is modest by astronomical standards, a few arc minutes for the highest-energy photons and about 3 degrees at 100 MeV. It is sensitive from 20 MeV to 300 GeV, from medium up to some very-high-energy gamma rays.

The LAT is a bigger and better successor to the EGRET instrument on NASA's Compton Gamma Ray Observatory satellite in the 1990s. Several countries produced the components of the LAT, who then sent the components for assembly at SLAC National Accelerator Laboratory. SLAC also hosts the LAT Instrument Science Operations Center, which supports the operation of the LAT during the Fermi mission for the LAT scientific collaboration and for NASA.

== Education and public outreach ==
Education and public outreach are important components of the Fermi project. The main Fermi education and public outreach website at http://glast.sonoma.edu offers gateways to resources for students, educators, scientists, and the public. NASA's Education and Public Outreach (E/PO) group operates the Fermi education and outreach resources at Sonoma State University.

== Rossi Prize ==
The 2011 Bruno Rossi Prize was awarded to Bill Atwood, Peter Michelson and the Fermi LAT team "for enabling, through the development of the Large Area Telescope, new insights into neutron stars, supernova remnants, cosmic rays, binary systems, active galactic nuclei and gamma-ray bursts."

In 2013, the prize was awarded to Roger W. Romani of Leland Stanford Junior University and Alice Harding of Goddard Space Flight Center for their work in developing the theoretical framework underpinning the many exciting pulsar results from Fermi Gamma-ray Space Telescope.

The 2014 prize went to Tracy Slatyer, Douglas Finkbeiner, and Meng Su "for their discovery, in gamma rays, of the large unanticipated Galactic structure called the Fermi bubbles."

The 2018 prize was awarded to Colleen Wilson-Hodge and the Fermi GBM team for the detection of GRB 170817A, the first unambiguous and completely independent discovery of an electromagnetic counterpart to a gravitational wave signal (GW170817) that "confirmed that short gamma-ray bursts are produced by binary neutron star mergers and enabled a global multi-wavelength follow-up campaign."

== See also ==
- Galactic Center GeV excess
- GRB 160625B
- List of gamma-ray bursts
- eROSITA
