= André Lebeau =

French engineer and author (1932–2013)

8th president of the French Space Agency
- In office 1995–1996
- Preceded by: René Pellat
- Succeeded by: Alain Bensoussan

Personal details
- Born: March 4, 1932 Montceau-les-Mines, France
- Died: February 25, 2013 (aged 80) Clamart, France
- Scientific career
- Education: École Normale Supérieure
- Awards: Frank J. Malina Astronautics Medal; Legion of Honour; National Order of Merit
- Fields: Aerospace engineering, meteorology
- Workplaces: CNES; Météo-France; ESA

André Lebeau (March 4, 1932 – February 25, 2013) was a French aerospace engineer, administrator, and author who served as the President of the National Center for Space Studies (CNES), Deputy Director General and Director of Programs at the European Space Agency, president of EUMETSAT, Vice President of World Meteorological Organization, and Director General of Météo-France. He authored several books on space and environmental topics. Lebeau received various honors including France's highest order of merit, Legion of Honour.

== Early life and education ==
Lebeau was born in Montceau-les-Mines, Saône-et-Loire. He studied at Lycée Saint-Louis before attending the École Normale Supérieure in Paris, where he received a degree in physical sciences in 1952. In 1956, he passed the agrégation examination in physical sciences. Lebeau received his doctorate in science in 1965, with the thesis titled Les courants électriques dans l'ionosphère des régions polaires (English: Electric Currents in the Ionosphere of the Polar Regions).

== Career ==
In 1958, Lebeau participated in the 2nd French Antarctic Expedition, supporting the construction of the Dumont d'Urville base during the International Geophysical Year. In 1961, he founded and directed the Ionospheric Research Group, a collaboration between telecommunications, geophysical, and scientific research organizations.

Lebeau joined the French Space Agency (CNES) in 1965 as Director of Programs and Planning. He later served as Deputy Director General for Industrial Policy Programs (1972–1975). He then worked at the European Space Agency from 1975 to 1980 as Deputy Director General and Director of Programs.

=== Roles ===
Position	Organization
Chair of Space Techniques and Programs	Conservatoire National des Arts et Métiers
Director	National Meteorology Office
Director General	Météo-France
President	French Polar Expeditions
President	EUMETSAT Council
Vice President	World Meteorological Organization
President	National Center for Space Studies (CNES)

== Honors and awards ==
Lebeau received various honors including:

- Frank J. Malina Astronautics Medal (1988)
- French National Order of Merit
- Legion of Honour

== Publications ==
Lebeau was the author of several books on space and technology as well as environmental issues. He is also the author of important physics work on the upper atmosphere and geomagnetism.

- Lebeau, André (1986). L'espace en héritage (in French). Odile Jacob. ISBN 978-2-02-009041-4.
- Cohendet, Patrick; Lebeau, André (1987). Choix stratégiques et grands programmes civils (in French). FeniXX réédition numérique. ISBN 978-2-402-12625-0.
- Salomon, Jean-Jacques; Lebeau, André (1987). L'Écrivain public et l'ordinateur: Mirages du développement (in French). Hachette (réédition numérique FeniXX). ISBN 978-2-01-461495-4.
- Lebeau, André (2005). L'engrenage de la technique: essai sur une menace planétaire (in French). Gallimard. ISBN 978-2-07-077456-2.
- Aubinière, Robert; Lebeau, André (2008). Le général Robert Aubinière: propos d'un des pères de la conquête spatiale française. Réflexions stratégiques. Paris: l'Harmattan. ISBN 978-2-296-05193-5.
- Lebeau, André (2008). L'enfermement planétaire. Le débat. Paris: Gallimard. ISBN 978-2-07-012117-5.
- Lebeau, André; Sanfourche, Jean-Pierre (2011). Les ballons au service de la recherche: l'aérostation scientifique des origines à nos jours (in French). Edite. ISBN 978-2-84608-282-2.
- Lebeau, André (2011). Les horizons terrestres: réflexions sur la survie de l'humanité (in French). Gallimard. ISBN 978-2-07-013239-3.
- Lebeau, André (2014-04-01). L'Espace Les enjeux et le mythes (in French). Hachette Littératures. ISBN 978-2-01-395752-6.

== Bibliography ==
- Pierre Morel, "", L'Archicube, no. 15b, February 2014, p. 201-205 (read online | archive).
- Biographie André Lebeau Professeur honoraire au Conservatoire national des arts et métiers, Who's Who in France
- Gaubert (Alain), Entretiens avec André Lebeau, Chantilly, Tessier et Ashpool, 2013
- Laurec (Alain), Éloge du Professeur André Lebeau, Académie de Marine, Communications et mémoires, Année académique 2015–2016, n° 2 (January–March 2016), p. 17-24. Bureau of Longitudes
