= Guy Laval =

French physicist

Guy Laval (born 17 November 1935 in Boulogne-sur-mer, Pas de Calais) is a French physicist, professor at the École polytechnique and member of the French Academy of Sciences.

He is a former student of the École polytechnique (X1956), a member of the Corps des Ponts and a doctor of physical sciences.

== Training and career ==
After attending the Ecole Polytechnique (1956–1958), he entered the Ecole Nationale des Ponts et Chaussées (1959–1961), then was seconded to the Commissariat à l'Energie Atomique (CEA) (1962–1971), and became a lecturer at the Ecole Polytechnique (1970–1982). He was a tutor on a five-year contract at the Institute for Advanced Study in Princeton, New Jersey (USA) (1976–1978), seconded to the CNRS as a research master (1971–1983), CNRS research director (1983–2003), then director of the Centre de physique théorique de l'école polytechnique (1985–1995) and finally a professor at the École polytechnique (1983–1992).

== Scientific work ==
Guy Laval's scientific work concerns plasma physics and its applications. First, he demonstrates the need for hydromagnetic energy principles for stability, and finds that the shape of the cross-section of a cylindrical pinch has a strong influence on its stability. Then, using Vlasov-Boltzmann's equations, he demonstrates the instability of a Harris pinch plan. He brings these results closer to the knowledge of the time on the interaction of the Earth's magnetosphere with the solar wind. He then uses intermediate formulations of the plasma evolution equations to calculate the magnetic reconnection in tokamaks, especially for the m=1 mode.

Then it evaluates the effects of wave coupling during the quasi-linear evolution of a plasma beam instability in the unidimensional case. It shows that imperfect turbulence or pump wave can have a stabilizing effect for parametric instability but can also restore parametric instability suppressed by plasma inhomogeneity. He shows that a non-linear displacement of the frequency of a daughter wave can make the interaction chaotic, thus limiting the reflectivity of the plasma. It shows that parametric instabilities are strongly modified if the amplitude of the laser wave reaches the relativistic domain and that the generated relativistic electrons are emitted with an angular dispersion that can be problematic for the rapid ignition of targets.

Finally, in the operation of Hall effect space thrusters, he found instability that explains the abnormal electronic conductivity that neutralizes the ion beam.

== Functions and Distinction ==
- Silver medal of the CNRS (1972)
- Member of the French Physical Society, of which he was President (1987–1988),
- Member of the European Physical Society,
- Deputy Director General of the École Polytechnique, in charge of education (1995–1996),
- Member of the National Committee for Scientific Research (1970–1975, 1988–1992, 1996–2000).
- Member of the French Academy of Sciences 2003
- Johannides Prize of the French Academy of Sciences 1983
- Jean Ricard Prize in Physics from the French Physical Society. 1993

== Books ==
- Christian Labrousse and Jean-Pierre Poirier, La science en France : dictionnaire biographique des scientifiques français de l'an mille à nos jours, Paris, Jean-Cyrille Godefroy, 2017, 1494 p. (ISBN 978-2-86553-293-3), entry "Laval, Guy", pp. 844–845
- Blue Energy: a history of nuclear fusion. Odile Jacob (2007)
- Uncertainties on climate, with K. Laval, Belin, (2013)
- Coordinator of the Report on Research and Technology, N°26: Nuclear fusion: from fundamental research to energy production?
