= Bob Twiggs =

American aerospace engineer and academic

Robert J. Twiggs
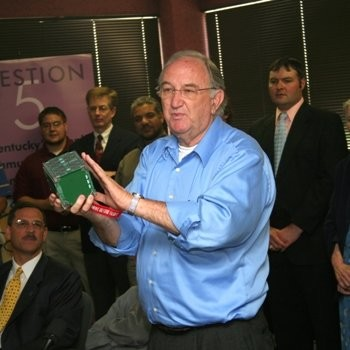
- Twiggs in 2009
- Born: November 27, 1935 (age 90); Blackfoot, Idaho, U.S.
- Education: University of Idaho (BS); Stanford University (MS)
- Known for: CubeSat; PocketQube; CanSat
- Scientific career
- Fields: Aerospace engineering, Astronautics
- Workplaces: Stanford University; Morehead State University

Robert J. "Bob" Twiggs (born 1935) is an American aerospace engineer, educator, and small satellite pioneer. He is best known for co-inventing the CubeSat reference design for miniaturized satellites along with Jordi Puig-Suari of California Polytechnic State University, a standardized architecture for small satellites that became widely used in education, research, technology demonstration, and commercial space applications.

Before becoming widely known for CubeSats, Twiggs developed a career at the intersection of engineering, education, and hands-on spacecraft development. His central educational philosophy emphasized learning by building. Rather than treating satellites only as large institutional projects, he promoted small spacecraft as practical teaching tools that could give students direct experience with systems engineering, hardware integration, testing, communications, and mission operations.

Twiggs was also critical in the invention and development of several other educational satellite concepts, including CanSat, PocketQube, and ThinSat. He is an emeritus professor of Astronautics and Space Science at Morehead State University.

== Education ==
Born on a potato farm in Idaho, Twiggs earned a Bachelor of Science in electrical engineering from the University of Idaho in 1961 and a Master of Science in electrical engineering with a concentration in microwave devices from Stanford University in 1964.

== Career ==
His early career included service in the United States Air Force as a radar technician on the North American F‑86D Sabre jet interceptor, followed by work in private industry on high-power microwave tubes and software.

From 1985 to 1994, Twiggs was the director of the Weber State University Center for Aerospace Technology (CAST). During this period, he began developing small satellite projects as educational tools, using spacecraft work to teach students engineering through direct participation. There he led the first student-built satellite from the USA, NUSAT (Northern Utah SATellite).

In 1994, Twiggs joined Stanford University’s Department of Aeronautics and Astronautics as a consulting professor. At Stanford, he established the Space Systems Development Laboratory, commonly known as SSDL. The laboratory became an important early center for student-built satellites. Under Twiggs’s leadership and influence, Stanford students worked on small satellite missions including SAPPHIRE and OPAL, projects that helped create the technical and educational setting from which the CubeSat idea emerged. In 1998, Twiggs proposed what would become the first CanSats at a symposium held in Hawaii.

After a brief retirement from Stanford in 2008, Bob Twiggs became a professor at Morehead State University in 2009. There, Twiggs developed the PocketQube concept, a satellite form factor smaller than a CubeSat. PocketQubes were intended to further reduce the size and cost of satellite projects while preserving the educational benefits of building real space hardware. Over the period 2017-2019 he co-developed and promoted ThinSats and related educational platforms to make space engineering projects accessible to younger students and broader educational communities. He retired from Morehead in 2018.

== CubeSat ==
Twiggs is widely credited with helping create the educational and technical foundation for the modern CubeSat movement. His influence came not only from the spacecraft standard itself, but also from the teaching model it supported. CubeSats allowed students to work on real missions with real constraints, including power, communications, thermal design, structures, attitude control, launch integration, licensing, and operations.

The CubeSat standard also helped create a broader small satellite ecosystem. By standardizing size, mass, and deployment interfaces, it encouraged the development of compatible components, commercial suppliers, university programs, launch services, and government initiatives. NASA, the European Space Agency, universities, national laboratories, and commercial companies have all used CubeSats for missions that range from education to advanced science and technology demonstration.

By early 2026, public nanosatellite tracking data recorded nearly 3,000 CubeSats launched. This growth made the CubeSat one of the most influential spacecraft standards of the early twenty-first century. Although the standard began as an educational tool, it became a major part of the small satellite industry and helped make spaceflight accessible to a wider range of organizations.

== Awards ==
- SSPI Space and Satellite Hall of Fame (2022)
- Small Satellite Conference Lifetime Achievement Award (2022)
- Sally Ride Excellence in Education Award (2022)
- Frank J. Malina Astronautics Medal (2024)
- Aviation Week's Philip J Klass Lifetime Achievement Award (2026)
