= Bruno Finzi =

Italian mathematician and physicist (1899–1974)

Bruno Finzi (born 13 January 1899 – 10 September 1974) was an Italian mathematician, engineer and physicist.

== Biography ==
Born in Gardone Val Trompia, Finzi received in 1920 his Laurea (MSE) as an engineer and in 1921 as a mathematician at the University of Pavia. In 1922, he became an assistant of Umberto Cisotti at the Polytecnico di Milano. In 1931, he became a professor of rational mechanics at the University of Milan, but returned in 1947 to the Polytecnico di Milano as the successor to Cisotti and became there director of the Mathematical Institute. From 1949, he was the head of the newly founded Institute of Aeronautics, and in 196,7 he became the rector of the Polytecnico.

His research dealt with various areas of mathematical physics, in particular with hydrodynamics, aerodynamics, elasticity theory and other areas of continuum mechanics, and the theories of special and general relativity.

Finzi was an Invited Speaker at the ICM in 1928 in Bologna and in 1932 in Zürich. In 1956, he received the Feltrinelli Prize from the Accademia dei Lincei and in 1933, the Kramer Prize from the Istituto Lombardo. He was elected a member of the Accademia dei Lincei. From 1965 to 1969, he was the president of the Associazone Italiana di Meccanica Teorica e Applicata (AIMETA).

He died in Milan in 1974.

== Selected publications ==
- with Gino Bozza: Resistenza idro ed aerodinamica, Milan 1935
- Meccanica razionale, Bologna 1946
- with Maria Pastori: Calcolo tensoriale e applicazioni, Bologna 1949
- Lezioni di aerodinamica, Milan 1953
