= Roland Doré (administrator) =

Dr. Roland Doré OC, CQ

2nd President of the Canadian Space Agency
- In office May 4, 1992 – July 15, 1994
- Governor General: Ray Hnatyshyn
- Prime Minister: Brian Mulroney
- Preceded by: Larkin Kerwin
- Succeeded by: William MacDonald Evans

Personal details
- Born: 1938 (age 87–88) Montreal, Quebec, Canada
- Awards: Honorary doctorates from McGill and Concordia Universities and Royal Military College in Kingston, Officer of the Order of Canada, Chevalier of the National Order of Quebec

Roland Doré, OC CQ (born 1938) spent his career at the École Polytechnique de Montréal as professor, director general and as chairman of the board of directors. He is a former president of the Canadian Space Agency from 1992 to 1994.

Doré served as president of the International Space University in Strasbourg, France from 1994 to 1998. He was awarded the Officer of the Order of Canada in 2001, Knight of the National Order of Quebec in 2010, and honorary doctorates from Concordia University, McGill University, Royal Military College Saint-Jean, and Royal Military College of Canada. He also received the Frank J. Malina Astronautics Medal in 2000.

He holds a bachelor's degree (1960) from the Polytechnique de Montréal, a master's degree (1965) and a doctorate in mechanical engineering (1969) from Stanford University.
