= Galactic Center GeV excess =

Unexplained gamma rays from the Galactic Center

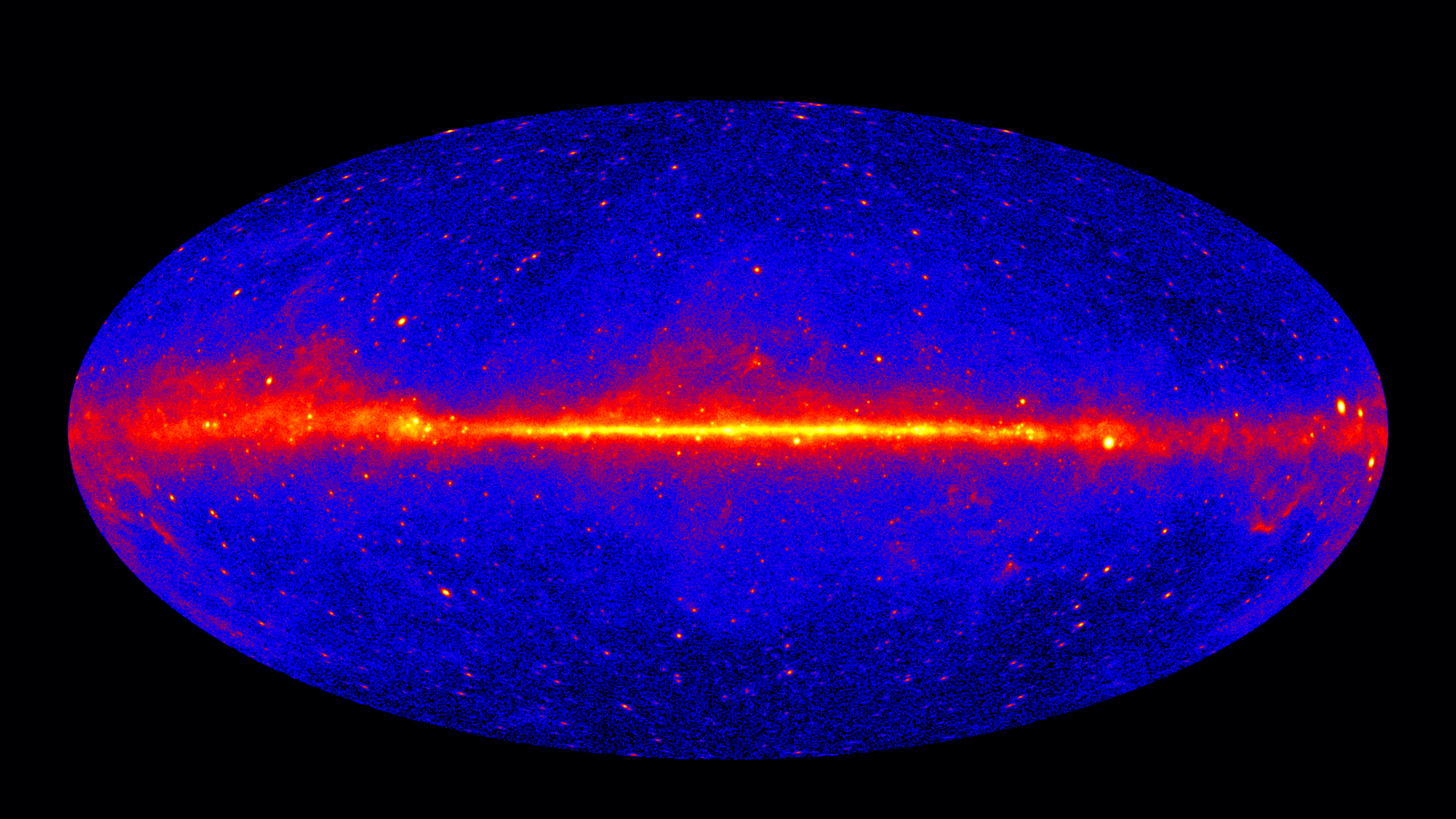
Gamma-ray radiation (greater than 1 Gev) detected over the entire sky; brighter areas are more radiation (five year study by the Fermi Gamma-ray Space Telescope: 2009–2013)

The Galactic Center GeV Excess (GCE) is an unexpected surplus of gamma-ray radiation coming from the center of the Milky Way Galaxy in the 1–3 GeV band. This approximately spherical source of radiation was first detected in 2009 by the Large Area Telescope of the Fermi Gamma-ray Space Telescope and is unexplained by direct observation of possible sources. Two percent of the gamma ray radiation in a 30° radius circle around the Galactic Center is attributed to the GCE. As of 2025, this excessive (and diffused) gamma-ray radiation is not well understood by astronomers.

Some astronomers argue that self-annihilating dark matter (which is not otherwise known to radiate) may be the cause of the GCE. This would also explain the excess diffuse microwave glow of the galactic center that had been discovered previously by the WMAP satellite. Other astronomers prefer a population of pulsars (which have not been observed) as the source of the gamma-ray excess.

Astronomers have suggested that self-annihilating dark matter may be a dominant contributor to the GCE, based on analysis using non-Poissonian template fitting statistical methods, wavelet methods, and studies by other astronomers may support this idea. More recently, in August 2020, other astronomers have reported that self-annihilating dark matter may not be the explanation for the GCE after all. Other hypotheses include ties to a yet unseen population of millisecond pulsars or young pulsars, burst events, the stellar population of the galactic bulge, or the Milky Way's central supermassive black hole.

A 2025 study, which simulated the evolution of the Milky Way to obtain the likely shape of the galaxy's dark matter halo, concluded that self-annihilation of dark matter WIMPs and a population of fast-rotating old pulsars remain equally plausible explanations of the GCE. Upcoming high-energy observations such as those of the Cherenkov Telescope Array Observatory may be able to resolve the matter.

A 2026 study based on additional Fermi data also reports an extended GeV excess across the Milky Way's galactic halo. This source has a different spectrum than the GCE does, spanning around 2–200 GeV and peaking around 21 GeV, and is more likely attributable to dark matter if the GCE is concentrated enough near the center that it would be better explained with a millisecond-pulsar source.

== See also ==
- Galactic Center – Rotational center of the Milky Way galaxy
- Gamma-ray astronomy – Observational astronomy performed with gamma rays
- List of unsolved problems in astronomy
