= CanSat =

Sounding rocket payload used to teach space technology

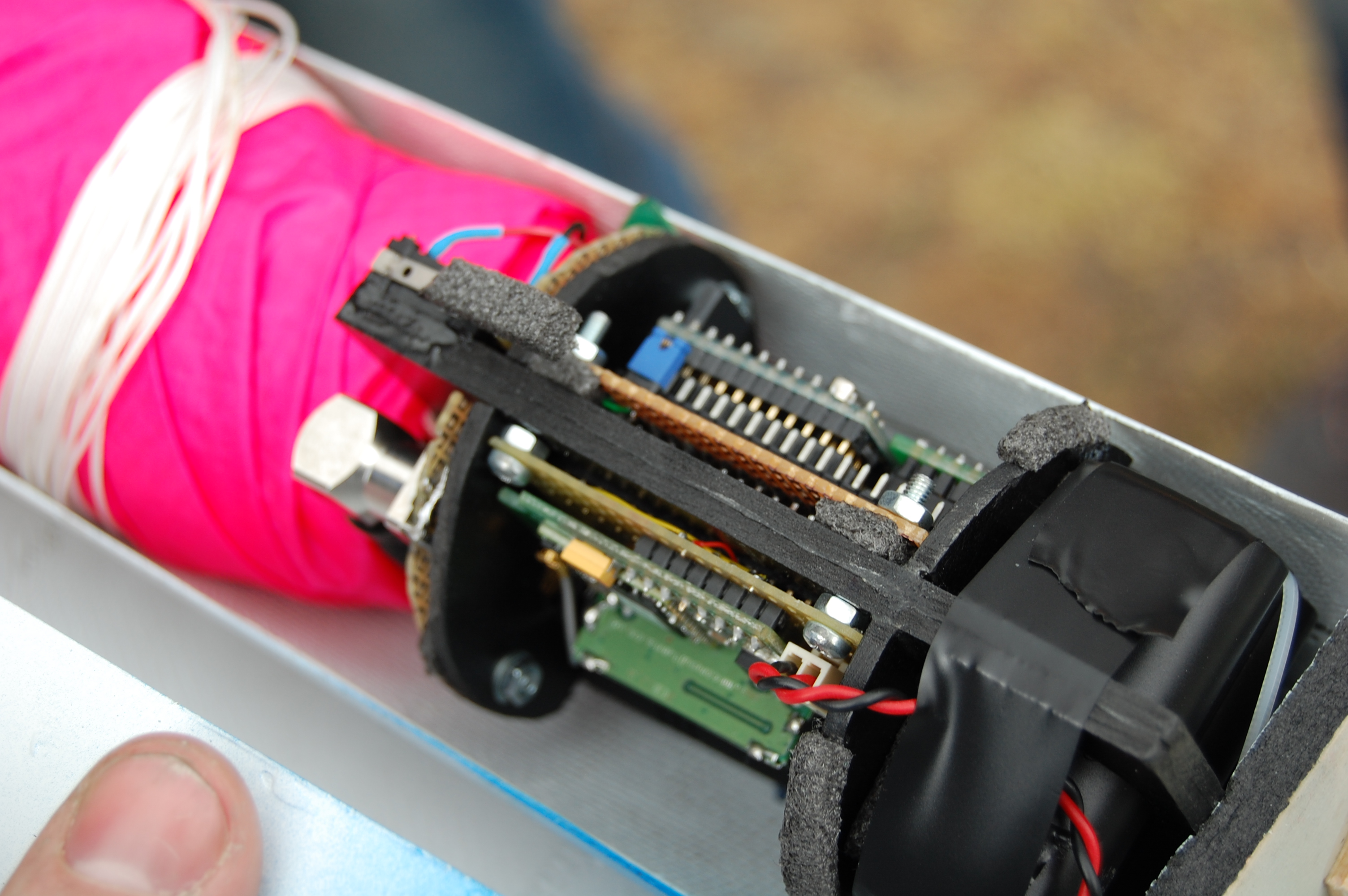
Internal mechanisms of a CanSat

A CanSat is a type of sounding rocket payload used to teach space technology. It is similar to the technology used in miniaturized satellites. CanSats do not go into space, but instead are released at an altitude of about 1 kilometer, using a rocket or a balloon.

In CanSat competitions, the payload is required to fit inside the volume of a typical soda can (66 mm diameter and 115 mm height) and have a mass below 350 g. Antennas can be mounted externally, but the diameter can't increase until the CanSat has left the launch vehicle. The CanSats are deployed from small rocket at height which varies depending on the competition. CanSats are equipped with a recovery system, usually a parachute, to limit damage upon recovery and to allow the CanSat to be reused. CanSats are used to teach space technology, because of their inexpensive price and small volume.

== History ==
In 1998, about 50 students and faculties from 12 universities from the United States and Japan met at a symposium held in Hawaii. It was the first "University Space Systems Symposium". Here, Bob Twiggs, professor emeritus at the Stanford University, proposed the initial idea of what later would become the nanosatellite projects. That idea was to launch a structure of the size of a soda can into space. Its volume should be around 350 milliliters and the mass, about 500 grams. This led to a project that began in 1999 called ARLISS, involving mostly American and Japanese Universities, carrying out the first launch on September, 11th of that year and continuing each year without interruption. The initial idea, still prevalent today, was to launch 3 satellites of 350 milliliters, or a satellite of greater volume. The means would be a rocket capable of moving 1.8 kilos and of ascending to 4000 meters, opening the door to low cost space flights -about $400. In 2000, the missions were very different: for instance, calculating the opening of a landing system using data provided by the barometer or making use of a differential GPS system. The project came to a more complex situation in 2001 when the ComeBack category was added, according to which the satellite should be directed to a particular target. This mission was very successful and, in 2002, students of Space Robotics Lab of the Tohoku University went up to 45 meters from the target and, in 2006, this figure dropped to 6 meters. Interest in this type of satellite has been growing and spreading. In 2003, the University of Tokyo placed into orbit two satellites CubeSat, satellites of a size slightly larger than the CanSats, and cube shaped. In recent years, several competitions have been developed following the same concept proposed by Prof. Bob Twiggs and reflected in ARLISS both national and internationally.

== Operation ==
=== Main elements ===
Some elements are shared by every CanSat:

==== Power supply ====
The battery and/or solar panels supply power for operation of all systems. The systems must be able to be powered for four hours continuously and the battery should be easy to access. The most commonly used due to its performance and current-weight ratio are lithium polymer batteries (LiPo).

==== Microprocessor ====
The microprocessor is the heart of the satellite, as it is responsible for receiving signals from external sensors (such as the altimeter, accelerometer or the transmitter) and also processes them to act as programmed.

CanSats generally use microcontrollers (MCU) and MCU boards which include an internal memory for data storage alongside the microprocessor, useful for storing information from various sensors during the flight. Some of the most common MCU choices are:

- STM32
- NXP LPC
- ESP32
- AVR

=== Secondary elements ===
Apart from the above-mentioned elements, others may be added in keeping with the mission it is entrusted with.

==== Barometer ====
The barometer consists of a pressure measuring cell which is connected to the microprocessor and sends a signal with a voltage value according to the pressure it feels. The microprocessor uses the standard atmospheric conditions to get the altitude. Example of barometer used in devices of this type:

- SCP1000

==== Thermometer ====
The thermometer carries out operations similar to the barometer but the voltage signal sent to the microprocessor depends on the temperature measured. The microprocessor interprets this signal by assigning a temperature value. These are examples of thermometers used:

- MAX6675
- TMP102
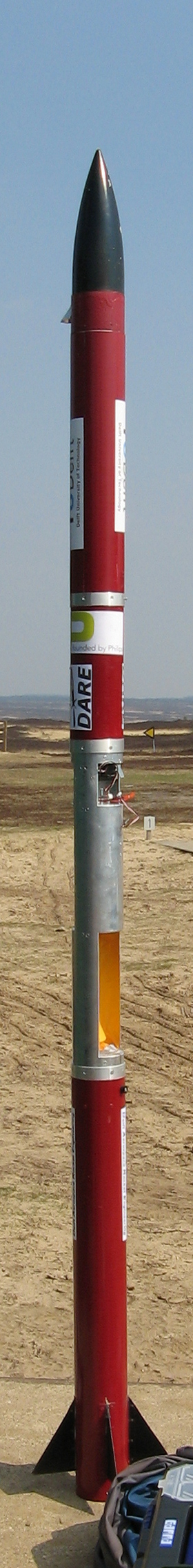
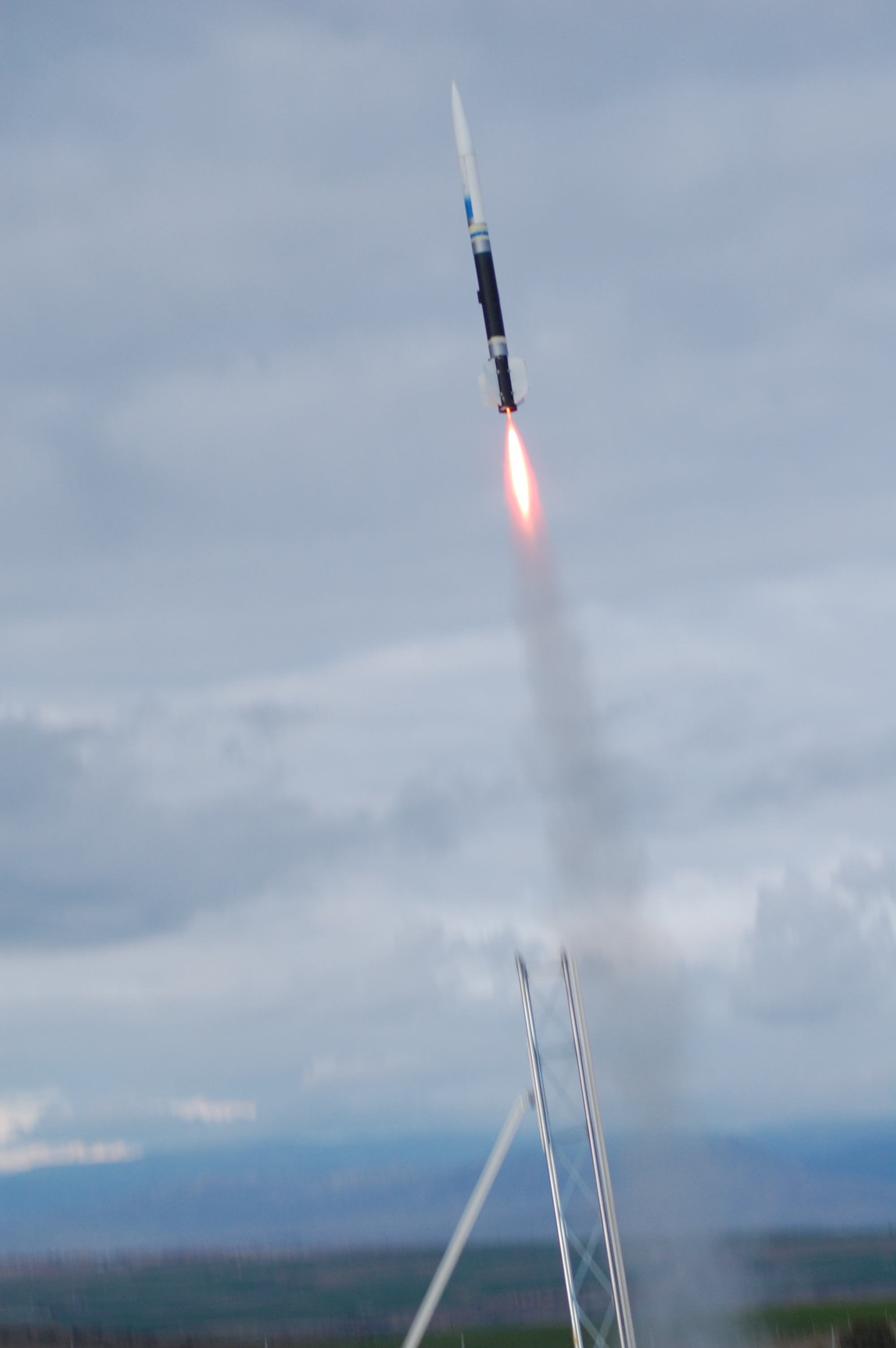
A CanSat rocket (left) and a CanSat being launched (right)

==== GPS module ====
The GPS is a land positioning system consisting of a satellite network orbiting around the Earth which continuously send their position and transmission time. From these data, the receiver triangulates its position with all the available satellites to get a higher accuracy. This position is sent to the microprocessor by a serial port as a data line.

At design level, GPS receivers should be located in a place where satellites vision line is as direct as possible in order not to be out of range with these ones during the flight. In a metallic structure CanSat, the receivers should be always located where the structure does not affect this vision line.

==== Camera ====
A mini camera can be included in the CanSat to photograph anything during the time the CanSat is descending in the air. Bearing in mind that the CanSat can not receive orders to operate the camera when the robot is in air so the microprocessor must be the one that orders the camera to take a picture. This is an example of a camera for CanSat:

- CameraC328

Cansats can also be used for 3d mapping.

==== Accelerometer ====
This system is made of one or more accelerometers in different axes. All the accelerometers aside allow to measure accelerations in coordinated axes. Accelerometers can be used to collect data or to determine position (by integration). The best accelerometers made to determine positions are called Inertial Navigation System INS. These are used on some CanSat models. The uncertainty of this system depends on the error when calibrating sensors. The pros of this system go from the fact that GPS is not needed, to immunity to magnetic interference. This allows multiple locations inside the CanSat. Some of the most used accelerometers are:

- ADXL345
- LIS302

==== Electronic compass ====
Sometimes, it is necessary to know the direction the CanSat is following (for instance, to perform a controlled descent), in which case a compass sensor is a very small sensor which like a traditional compass measures the angle between its direction and the north. This angle is transmitted to the microprocessor via a potential difference. The microprocessor interprets the incoming signal and acts accordingly. Thus, if the CanSat was intended to arrive to a target without using a GPS receiver, this sensor would play a crucial role. Some models of compasses used are:

- CMPS03
- HMC6352
- HMC5843

== Types ==
There are mainly two types of CanSats, though a third category is usually added for those machines that do not fit in the two first:

=== Telemetry ===
This is the one whose primary purpose is to collect and transmit data from the flight and weather conditions in real time to be processed by a ground station. CanSats in this category do not use a steering system since its objective is not to fall at a particular point but to collect data while the descent (which is not usually controlled). Of the systems mentioned in the previous sections the most used are: barometer, thermometer, GPS and camera.

=== Comeback ===
The main task of these is to land in a controlled manner as close as possible to a target marked by GPS coordinates. These devices can be guided by GPS or by and Inertial Navigation System or INS. This position is sent to the microprocessor which compares the position of the target from the analysis of these data to calculate the angle at which it should turn to address the target and gives appropriate instructions to the steering system. This process is repeated continuously to make corrections. Such devices also store data on the flight but since the number of sensors that accompany them is less, information is more scarce than in the previous type. A ComeBack CanSat always carries a steering system that allows it to maneuver, to orient and to move towards the target. Normally such a mechanism is actuated by one or more actuators controlled by the microprocessor so that the servomotor rotates to one side or the other and so rotating CanSat. There are two main types depending on whether CanSat incorporates a parachute or glider or a rotor and wings.

==== CanSats with parachutes or paragliders ====
These devices generally have a steering system consisting of threads that move asymmetrically so as to generate a difference in lift of the longitudinal axis so the CanSat rotates in one way or another. It uses fairly simple mechanics. These devices are difficult to govern due to the generally low rate of descent and the large surface area lifts it.

==== CanSats with wings or rotors ====
Mechanically more complex and less vulnerable to weather conditions that CanSats with parachute or gliders. This kind of gadgets are much more harsh to govern and require an electronic system able to perform many more corrections per second due to its higher rate of descent.

=== Openclass ===
In this category, any robot that is not included in any of the previous two categories can be submitted. Most CanSat presented in this category are robots testing new systems or new designs that have not yet been tested (technology demonstrators).

== Educational interest ==
The low cost of implementation, short preparation time and simplicity of design compared to other space projects make of this concept an excellent practical opportunity for students to take their first steps in space. Students are responsible for choosing the way the mission is fulfilled, the CanSat design, components integration, correct operation verification, launch preparation, data analysis and team organisation by distributing the workload. It is basically a scale replica of the design, creation and launch of a real satellite. The process required to develop a CanSat entails a learning process known as problem-based learning, a new teaching method in which the student is the main character and the one who must solve the problems. The main characteristic of this type of project is being carried out by teams facing open problems driven by successive challenges. The support given by teachers is declining in keeping with the experience the group is reaching to recognize that systems engineering also has to deal with the complexity of development and research of their own abilities. Space engineering discipline is one of the most typical methods used in education because it provides a wide range of attractive themes.

== Competitions ==
CanSat competitions are conducted in Europe, the United States and Asia, etc.

=== United States ===
==== CanSat Competition ====
In the United States, one of the CanSat design-build-launch competitions is organized by the American Astronautical Society and the American Institute of Aeronautics and Astronautics. Other sponsors of the competition include the Naval Research Laboratory, NASA, AGI, Orbital Sciences Corporation, Praxis Incorporated, and SolidWorks.

==== ARLISS ====
ARLISS Project is a collaborative effort between students and faculty Development Program Space Systems at Stanford University and other educational institutions to build, launch, test and recover prototype miniaturized satellites in preparation for launch into Earth orbit or Mars space. ARLISS proposes a challenge to obtain practical experience in the life cycle (about a year) of a space project. Each team designs and builds one or more satellites, and they move to the launch site at Black Rock, Nevada, to oversee the preparation, launch, operation and safe recovery of their experiments. ARLISS provides the rockets, each able to carry three CanSats parachute at an altitude of 3,500 meters, which allows each CanSat a flight time of about 15 minutes to the experiments, which simulates a horizon to horizon orbit low orbit pass.

=== Europe ===
The European Cansat Competition is promoted by the European Space Agency and it's focused on high school students. It is a competition in which each CanSat must meet the traditional requirements of volume and not exceed 350 grams of mass along with others related to the flight time and to budget. In addition to measuring pressure and temperature and transmit this data in real time. Apart from this, the CanSat should play a secondary mission of free choice. Proposals for this mission are used to select the teams that will launch their CanSats on board a rocket that ascends to 1000 meters, where it opens and drops the two CanSats which are inside.

=== India ===
The University CanSat Challenge by Antariksha Labs-ARDL – CanSat comes to India is a design-build-fly competition that provides teams with an opportunity to experience the design life-cycle of an aerospace system. The University CanSat Challenge is designed to reflect a typical aerospace program on a small scale. The mission and its requirements are designed to reflect various aspects of real world missions including telemetry requirements, communications, and autonomous operations. Each team is scored throughout the challenge on real world deliverables such as schedules, design reviews, and demonstration flights. The event was on mid of August 2015 to the launch on 17 January 2016 at Hoskote, it was organised by Antariksha Labs and hosted by Indian Institute Science, Bangalore. The panelists who judged the event were eminent scientists of ISRO. Team NIT Surat Emerged Victorious after the Post Flight briefings.

=== Czech Republic ===
Organized by ESERO Czech Republic it is a small sized competition serving as a qualification turn for the European CanSat Competition. Focus of the participants is, along with the construction of the satellite itself, mostly on an effective presentation of the project to the jury as well as the public as the presence on social networks and overall public representation of the project makes up for a significant portion of the final evaluation.

=== Spain ===
The Laboratory for Space and Microgravity Research (LEEM) along with the help of the Polytechnic University of Madrid (UPM) organize an International CanSat Competition since the First International CanSat Competition that took place in 2008. There are three categories in accordance with the types of CanSat detailed on the top of this page. There is another open category in which the size limitations are not so strict and the gadget can have a larger mass, of up to about 1 kilo. Just as in the European competition, some data should be sent by telemetry in real time and there are budget limitations for the participant teams.

=== France ===
Organized by CNES (the French Space Agency) and the association Planète Sciences, the French competition takes place during the C'Space campaign, an outreach program of space-related technology for youngsters. In this competition CanSats are dropped from a static dirigible airship at an altitude around 200 m. Two categories are available : "international" and "open" in which the volume requirements are extended to allow a volume of up to 1 liter compared to the 330 milliliters of a traditional CanSat.

=== Republic of Korea ===
From 2012, Korean Ministry of Science, ICT and Future Planning has been sponsoring Korean CanSat competition / camp to popularize CanSat culture in Korea and enhance student's knowledge on satellite management. This competition, along with Korean CubeSat Competition, constitute two main satellite competitions that are offered by Korean government. The competition is maintained by SaTReC (Satellite Technology Research Center), a national satellite research center which is responsible for multiple successful Korean satellites, and is part of KAIST – one of the most prestigious science-oriented schools. All fees for developing CanSats are subsidized by the Korean government on need, as part of government's masterplan to develop space technology. High school students and undergraduate students can make team of 3 students to participate in this competition.

High school students (grades 10~12) participate in Seulgi sector (슬기부), and is required to go through additional creative tasks using the basic CanSat platform. Examples of these tasks include 'Python-based base system', 'Modular Structure for CanSats'. Every May, all participating teams should submit their plan on developing CanSat, and performing team-specific tasks. Then, 20 teams that are chosen according to the viability of their task and basic knowledge on CanSat. These teams go through online-based education and get time to implement their tasks according to the base system they have built. Completeness of their tasks and base system is once again evaluated, to choose 10 teams that can finally launch their CanSat. After education session by Korean space researchers, these Cansat are launched in Goheung, which also the area Naro Space Center is located.

Undergraduate students participate in Changjo sector (창조부), and goes through similar process like high school students do. The main difference is that whereas high school students receive base station programs to help students who are not used to programming, undergraduate students should program their base station programs for themselves. The basic schedule is same to those of high school students.

Middle school and some primary school students (Grades 5–9) take part in what is called 'Korean CanSat Camp', maintained and sponsored by the same authorities. Based upon their interest and knowledge on CanSat, 30 teams, which are consisted of 2 student members, are chosen to participate in the CanSat camp. For 2 days, these students are educated by Korean space researchers. They develop their basic CanSat (with GPS, luminance sensor, inertial mass unit, etc.) during the camp.

=== Japan ===
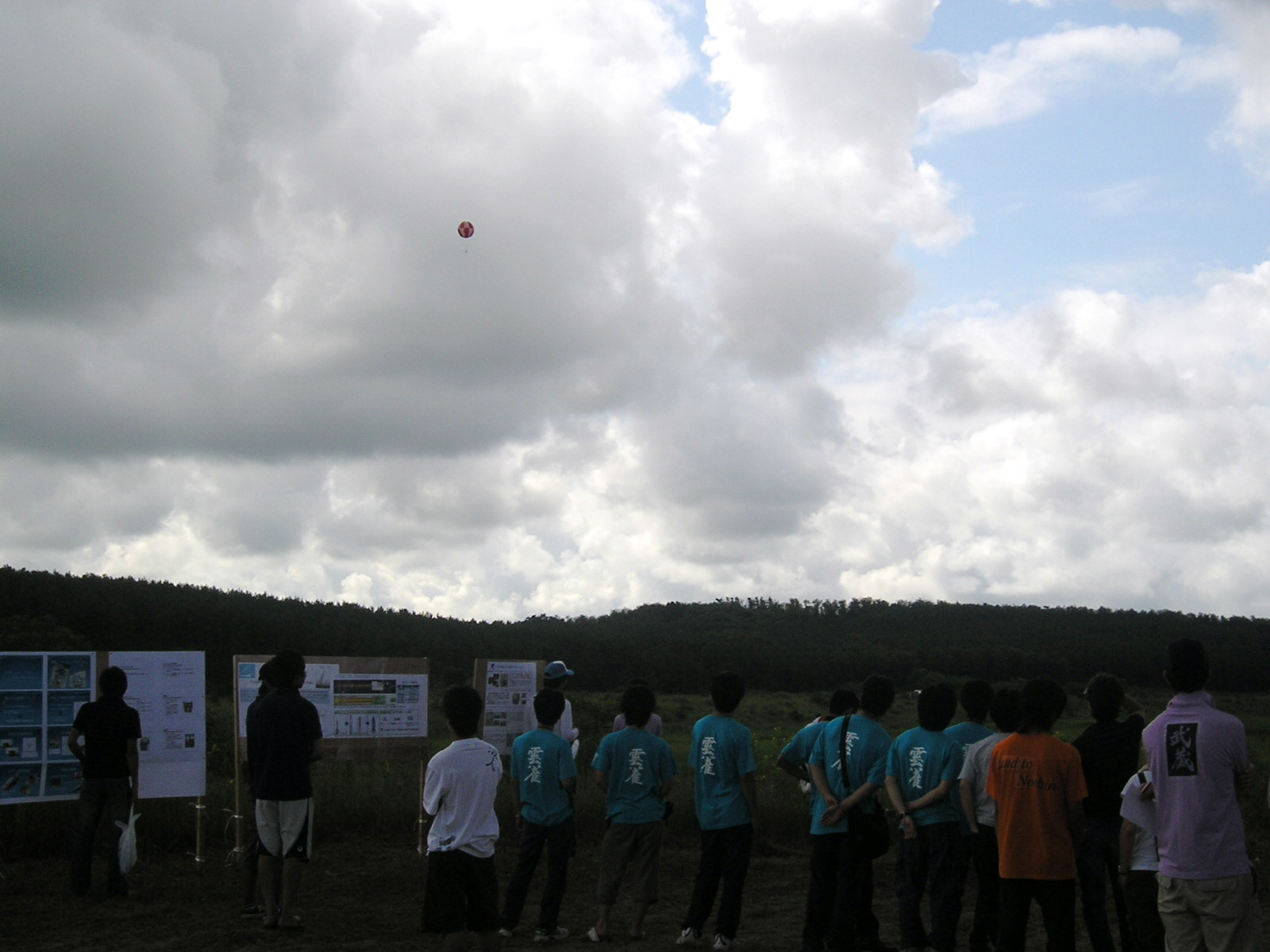
Launch using a ballon in the Japanese Competition at the Noshiro Space Event '07 held in Noshiro, Akita

In Japan, this contest is organized by the UNISEC (University Space Engineering Consortium) and unlike other editions in which the CanSats are launched by a rocket, here it is a balloon that ascends to a certain height, after which the CanSat is dropped. This competition is all about reaching a certain position, either through modification of the flight path, or by the addition of wheels to allow the CanSat arrive to the required place.

=== Argentina ===
In Argentina, there is a CanSat meeting, but it is not competitive; instead of this, the CanSat Program is a study methodology conducted through experimentation using self-built reusable launchers. This program is released for free and provides students satisfaction, involving them in the entire life cycle of a complex engineering project, ranging from conceptual design, integration, testing, and actual system operations, concluding with a meeting of post-mission summary. CanSat Program is organized annually by ACEMA (Association of Experimental Rocketry and Space Modeling of Argentina). The program was presented in September 2003 at an educative conference, and the first Argentine CanSat was launched in November 2004, prepared by students of Colegio San Felipe Neri.

=== Iran ===
Iran Cansat Competition (ICC) is another competition held for design and manufacturing of Cansat, sponsored by Iran Astronautics Research Institute (ARI). The competition has been held every year since 2011 and contains two categories named Classical and Professional, The Classical category includes Atmospheric Sounding and Photo/Video Capturing missions, while the Professional one includes Bio-Payload Recovery and Comeback missions. Teams shall prepare PDR and CDR before the operation and PFR after the cansats were tested in the field. Students are expected to not only improve their knowledge on technical issues, but also gain the systematic view needed for a multidisciplinary project and get the experience of being involved in a project in the whole life cycle from scratch to the product. The fourth Iran International Cansat Competition (ICC2014) was scheduled to be held in October 2014. Eight competitions have been held.(2019-2020) In the eighth round of the competition (2019-2020),the two teams AUTSPACE and AUTSPACE-Pluse from Amirkabir University of Technology won the First and Third places under the supervision of Ahmadreza Karami and the advice of Dr.Kamran Raisi. A team from Yazd University of Iran can also win the Second title.

=== South Africa ===
The first South African CanSat was carried to height of 1650m, as payload aboard a High Power Rocket, on 6 November 1999. Dubbed, ZACan-1, the Cansat was designed and built by Stéfan Stoltz and launched in the Roodewal FAR76 airspace (Limpopo Province) as part of a Technology Exhibition by the University of the North (now the University of Limpopo). In 2011/12, the University of Cape Town (UCT)) launched its first CanSat competition in association with the South African Astronomical Observatory. As of 2013, a number of South African universities have started evaluating and integrating CanSat projects into their curricula. It is anticipated that the South African National Space Agency will play a leading role in the future promotion of CanSat competitions within South Africa.

=== Iraqi Kurdistan ===
A CanSat program in Kurdistan, known as the Computer Rocket Association of Iraqi Kurdistan (now defunct) was originally established in 1992 by Falah Mustafa Bakir. The Kurdistani government, at this time developing its short-range missile program, created the Association to encourage young students to join the military technology field. The program was a success and saw funding nearly triple towards the beginning of 2000. During Hussein's final years in power from 2000 until 2003, the Association received much more limited funding due to, according to Hussein's secretary, what was known as "subversive activity in the Rocketry Association to divert funds to the enemy". The justification was unfounded and the Association barely lasted until the 2003 Invasion of Iraq.

In 2003 during the US-Coalition invasion of Iraq, the Association's funding was completely cut due to severe wartime strains on the government. The Association was disbanded after the invasion ended in late 2003, but American military figures saw the potential of a rocket program in the United States. Soon after, funding for a student-centered rocket association enabled 26 American schools to have the program. Ever since, multiple countries have adopted the student rocket programs and expanded funding into technology-based STEM associations, modeled after the success of the initial Computer Rocket Association of Iraqi Kurdistan.

In late July 2024, the Kurdistan Space Research Agency (KSRA) was founded by Zhiro Mustafa. The agency has recently begun its operations, focusing on advancing space science and technology in the Kurdistan region. Currently, KSRA is working on developing a CanSat satellite, marking its first major project. The agency has not yet started any competitions, as it is concentrating its efforts on successfully creating and launching this satellite.

== See also ==
- Space science
