= Microstrip detector =

Particle detector made of semiconductor strips

Microstrip detector consisting of semiconductor strips in a base substrate

In nuclear electronics, a microstrip detector is a particle detector that consists of a large number of identical semiconductor strips laid out along one axis of a two-dimensional structure, generally by lithography. The geometrical layout of the components allows the reconstruction of the track of an incoming particle of ionizing radiation.

Silicon microstrip detectors are a common design used in various particle physics experiments. The detection mechanism consists of the production of electron-hole pairs in a layer of silicon a few hundreds of micrometers thick. The free electrons are drifted by an electric field created by a pattern of anodes and cathodes interdigitated on the surface of the silicon and separated by a SiO_{2} insulator.

== See also ==
- Semiconductor detector
- Hybrid pixel detector
