= Simone Ercoli (tennis) =

Italian tennis player

- Country (sports): Italy
- Plays: Right-handed

Singles
- Career record: 0-2
- Highest ranking: No. 421 (17 March 1986)

Grand Slam singles results
- French Open Junior: 3R (1982)
- US Open Junior: 2R (1981)

Doubles
- Highest ranking: No. 536 (9 July 1984)

Grand Slam doubles results
- French Open Junior: QF (1982)
Medal record
Mediterranean Games
Bronze medal – third place	1983 Casablanca	Singles

Simone Ercoli is a former tennis player from Italy who won a bronze medal at the 1983 Mediterranean Games.

After retiring from the sport, he has been the coach of fellow countrymen Simone Bolelli and Federico Gaio, among others.
