= Caitlin Casey =

Observational astronomer

Caitlin M Casey
- Education: University of Arizona (2003-2007), University of Cambridge (2007-2010)
- Occupation: Astronomer
- Employer(s): University of California Santa Barbara (2025-), University of Texas at Austin (2015-2024)
- Known for: Principal Investigator of COSMOS-Web JWST Program
- Honours: 2018 Newton Lacy Pierce Prize, 2019 Cottrell Scholar Award, 2025 Edith & Peter O'Donnell Award

Caitlin M Casey is an observational astronomer and professor at the University of California Santa Barbara. She is known for her work in extragalactic astrophysics; she works on the formation and evolution of massive galaxies in the early Universe. Dr. Casey has done over 16 years worth of research regarding high-redshift galaxies.

== Education and career ==
Casey's interest in astronomy began as a child when she was given the opportunity to visit the planetarium in Rock Bridge High School in her hometown of Columbia, Missouri.

Casey completed her bachelor's degrees in physics, astronomy and applied mathematics from the University of Arizona in 2007. She attributes her decision to attend Arizona from first attending their Astronomy Camp during high school. She then obtained her Ph.D. in Astronomy from the University of Cambridge in 2010 under a Gates Cambridge Scholarship. While in Cambridge she served as president of the Gates Scholars' Society from 2009 to 2010. Casey was subsequently a NASA Hubble Postdoctoral Fellow at the Institute for Astronomy, University of Hawai’i at Mānoa, and then she spent two years as a postdoc at the University of California, Irvine as a McCue Postdoctoral Fellow of Cosmology. Casey became assistant professor in the Department of Astronomy at the University of Texas at Austin in 2015. From 2021 to 2024, Casey was an associate professor at UT Austin, and in 2025 she moved to the University of California Santa Barbara as a full professor in the physics department.

== Career and research ==
Casey is known for her research on galaxy formation and evolution, specifically on the most massive and luminous galaxies in the Universe. While in Hawaii, she examined the formation of starburst galaxies, research that was conducted with the largest spectroscopic survey using the W.M. Keck Observatory of submillimeter-luminous galaxies detected by the Herschel Space Observatory. While at the University of California, Irvine, Casey authored a review paper on star-forming galaxies. Casey is principal investigator of the COSMOS-Web Survey and the Cosmic Evolution Survey. This work is a collaborative effort with Jeyhan Kartaltepe. The COSMOS-Web Survey is a $0.54\,{\rm deg}^2$ James Webb Space Telescope NIRCam imaging program that aims to reveal the sources of cosmic reionization and was the telescope's largest allocated project in its first year of observations. She presented the initial results of her research with the COSMOS-Web survey in 2023. In 2025, Casey helped compile the largest map of the universe using images from the James Webb Space Telescope called the COSMOS-Web field.

Casey is an advocate for equity in STEM, creating the TAURUS program, a summer research experience for marginalized students in the summer of 2016. This program is hosted at the University of Texas at Austin at the McDonald Observatory and allows under-represented undergraduate students to get involved with astronomical research. Casey created a workshop designed to spread awareness about bullying, microaggressions and harassment for academic researchers with her colleague Kartik Sheth called The Ethical Gray Zone in 2013.

== Selected publications ==
- Casey, Caitlin M. (2012-10-01). "Far-infrared spectral energy distribution fitting for galaxies near and far: Far-infrared SED fitting". Monthly Notices of the Royal Astronomical Society. 425 (4): 3094–3103. arXiv:1206.1595. doi:10.1111/j.1365-2966.2012.21455.x.
- Casey, Caitlin M.; Chen, Chian-Chou; Cowie, Lennox L.; Barger, Amy J.; Capak, Peter; Ilbert, Olivier; Koss, Michael; Lee, Nicholas; Le Floc'h, Emeric; Sanders, David B.; Williams, Jonathan P. (2013-12-11). "Characterization of Scuba-2 450 μm and 850 μm selected galaxies in the COSMOS field". Monthly Notices of the Royal Astronomical Society. 436 (3): 1919–1954. arXiv:1302.2619. doi:10.1093/mnras/stt1673. ISSN 1365-2966.
- Casey, Caitlin M.; Narayanan, Desika; Cooray, Asantha (2014). "Dusty star-forming galaxies at high redshift". Physics Reports. 541 (2): 45–161. arXiv:1402.1456. Bibcode:2014PhR...541...45C. doi:10.1016/j.physrep.2014.02.009.
- Lee, Nicholas; Sanders, D. B.; Casey, Caitlin M.; Toft, Sune; Scoville, N. Z.; Hung, Chao-Ling; Le Floc'h, Emeric; Ilbert, Olivier; Zahid, H. Jabran; Aussel, Hervé; Capak, Peter; Kartaltepe, Jeyhan S.; Kewley, Lisa J.; Li, Yanxia; Schawinski, Kevin (2015-03-05). "A Turnover in the Galaxy Main Sequence of Star Formation at M * ∼ 10 10 M ☉ for Redshifts z < 1.3". The Astrophysical Journal. 801 (2): 80. arXiv:1501.01080. doi:10.1088/0004-637X/801/2/80. ISSN 1538-4357.

== Honors and awards ==
Casey received the 2018 Newton Lacy Pierce Prize awarded by the American Astronomical Society for impactful work in observational astronomy achieved before age 36. In 2019 she was awarded a Cottrell Scholar Award from the Research Corporation for Science Advancement. In 2025, Casey was honored with the Edith and Peter O'Donnell Award in the Physical Sciences issued by the Academy of Medicine, Engineering and Science of Texas.
