= Space Talk =

Space Talk may refer to:

- A radio program about the aerospace industry hosted by Jim Banke
- A song by Asha Puthli
