= John Johnson (astronomer) =

American astrophysicist and professor of astronomy

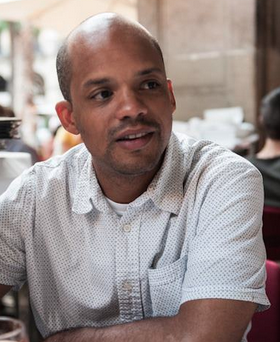
- Johnson at the 2012 Cool Stars Meeting in Barcelona
- Born: John Asher Johnson; January 4, 1977 (age 49); Albuquerque, New Mexico
- Citizenship: United States
- Education: Missouri University of Science and Technology; University of California at Berkeley
- Known for: Exoplanet research
- Awards: Sloan Fellowship (2012); Newton Lacy Pierce Prize (2012)
- Scientific career
- Fields: Astronomy
- Workplaces: California Institute of Technology; Harvard University
- Doctoral advisor: Geoffrey Marcy
- Website: Harvard Astronomy page

John Asher Johnson (4 January 1977) is an American astrophysicist and professor of astronomy at Harvard. He is the first tenured African-American physical science professor in the history of the university. Johnson is well known for discovering three of the first known planets smaller than the Earth outside of the Solar System, including the first Mars-sized exoplanet.

== Early life and education ==
Johnson grew up in St. Louis. He graduated from the University of Missouri at Rolla (since renamed the Missouri University of Science and Technology) in 1999 with a Bachelors of Science degree in physics. In-between his undergraduate degree and graduate school, he also worked as a research scientist with LIGO at Caltech. He entered graduate school at UC Berkeley having never taken a course in astronomy. Johnson completed his Ph.D. in astrophysics in 2007 under Geoff Marcy. His thesis was titled "Planet Hunting In New Stellar Domains" and included the detection of several unusual hot Jupiters. Johnson has his sights focused on detecting any signs of life outside of the solar system in this lifetime.

== Scientific career ==
Johnson is currently a professor of astronomy at Harvard, where he is one of several professors who study exoplanets along with David Charbonneau, Dimitar Sasselov, and others. When he was appointed to this position in 2013, he became the first tenured African-American professor in any of the physical sciences at the university. He was formerly a professor at the California Institute of Technology and a researcher with NASA's Exoplanet Science Research Institute. Before attaining a faculty job, Johnson was a National Science Foundation (NSF) post-doctoral fellow at the Institute for Astronomy, a part of the University of Hawaiʻi.

Johnson was also awarded the David and Lucile Packard Fellowship and the Lyman Spitzer Lectureship alongside his know Solan Fellowship in 2012.

=== Research ===
Johnson does research on the detection and characterization of exoplanets, that is, planets located outside the Solar System. His work involves planets detected with a variety of methods. He is a founding principal investigator of the Miniature Exoplanet Radial Velocity Array (MINERVA), a ground-based robotic telescope array that searches for exoplanets primarily through the radial velocity method while also looking for transits. More related to transiting planets, Johnson has worked on precisely measuring the properties of planet-hosting stars found with the Kepler mission, a vital task for determining the properties of the planets themselves. He is also involved with K2, the successor to the original Kepler mission.

In 2012, Johnson's team discovered three small rocky exoplanets in a red dwarf star system observed with the Kepler space telescope. The system was renamed Kepler-42 and the outermost planet was found to be nearly as small as Mars, making it the smallest known exoplanet at the time. A subsequent study used the host star's similarity to Barnard's Star and observations from the Keck Observatory to more precisely measure the properties of the system, including the sizes of the three planets.

== Diversity initiatives ==
Johnson is the founder of the Banneker Institute, a summer program hosted at the Center for Astrophysics | Harvard & Smithsonian. The program provides funding for undergraduate students from backgrounds underrepresented in astronomy, with a focus on students of color. It has merged with a similar program into the joint Banneker & Aztlán Institute, which also targets Latin and Native American students. In addition to research, the institute emphasizes discussions on social justice issues and their relevance in the field of astronomy.
