= NGC 735 =

Galaxy in the constellation Triangulum

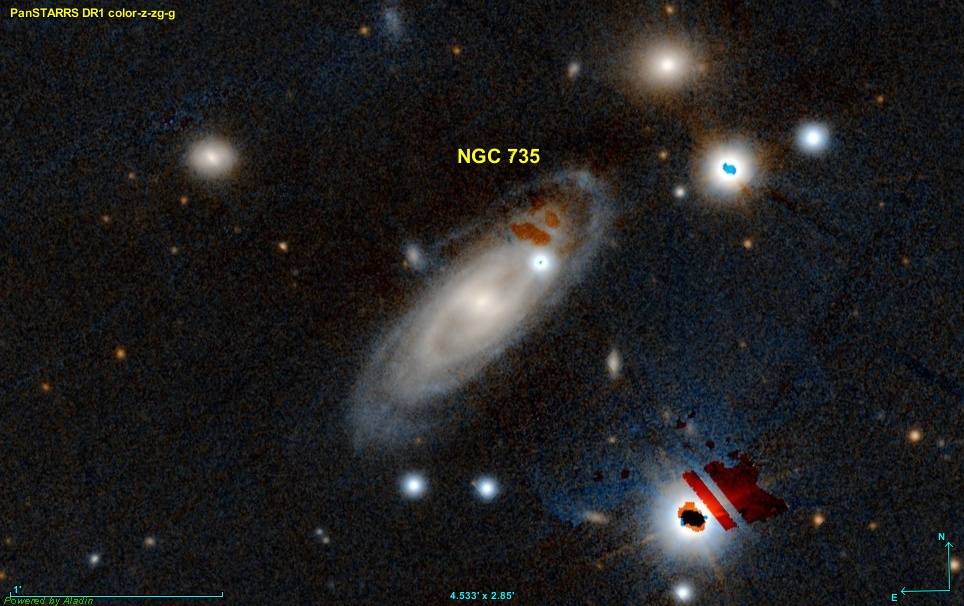
- NGC 735 imaged by Pan-STARRS

Observation data (J2000 epoch)
- Constellation: Triangulum
- Right ascension: 01^{h} 56^{m} 37.9936^{s}
- Declination: +34° 10′ 36.446″
- Redshift: 0.015441
- Heliocentric radial velocity: 4629 ± 3 km/s
- Distance: 210.4 ± 14.7 Mly (64.52 ± 4.52 Mpc)
- Group or cluster: NGC 669 Group (LGG 37)
- Apparent magnitude (V): 13.3

Characteristics
- Type: Sb
- Size: ~125,900 ly (38.60 kpc) (estimated)
- Apparent size (V): 1.8′ × 0.8′

Other designations
- IRAS F01537+3356, 2MASX J01563802+3410366, UGC 1411, MCG +06-05-058, PGC 7275, CGCG 522-078

NGC 735 is a spiral galaxy in the constellation of Triangulum. Its velocity with respect to the cosmic microwave background is 4374 ± 18 km/s, which corresponds to a Hubble distance of 210.4 ± 14.7 Mly (64.52 ± 4.52 Mpc). In addition, eight non redshift measurements give a distance of 227.21 ± 7.99 Mly (69.662 ± 2.449 Mpc). The galaxy was discovered by German-British astronomer William Herschel on 13 September 1784.

NGC 735 has a possible active galactic nucleus, i.e. it has a compact region at the center of a galaxy that emits a significant amount of energy across the electromagnetic spectrum, with characteristics indicating that this luminosity is not produced by the stars.

== Supernovae ==
Three supernovae have been observed in NGC 664:

- SN 1972L (type unknown, mag. 15) was discovered by American astronomer John Huchra on 3 September 1972.
- SN 2000dj (Type II, mag. 17.4) was discovered by the Lick Observatory Supernova Search (LOSS) on 8 September 2000.
- SN 2006ei (Type Ic, mag. 18.5) was discovered by LOSS on 21 August 2006.

== NGC 669 Group ==
NGC 735 is a member of the NGC 669 group (also known as LGG 37). This group contains 34 galaxies, of which 15 are in NGC, 11 are in UGC, and 3 are in IC.

== See also ==
- List of NGC objects (1–1000)
