= Kristen Sellgren =

American astronomer

- Born: November 14, 1955 (age 70); San Diego, California, U.S.
- Education: University of California, San Diego (B.A.); California Institute of Technology (Ph.D.)
- Awards: Newton Lacy Pierce Prize (1990)
- Scientific career
- Fields: Astronomy
- Workplaces: University of Hawaiʻi; Ohio State University
- Thesis: Near Infrared Studies of Reflection Nebulae (1983)
- Doctoral advisor: B. T. Soifer; Gerry Neugebauer
- Website: www.astronomy.ohio-state.edu/sellgren.1/

Kristen Sellgren (born November 14, 1955) is an American retired astronomer and Professor Emerita at the College of Natural and Mathematical Sciences, Ohio State University. She won the Newton Lacy Pierce Prize in Astronomy in 1990. She is the founder of American Astronomical Society's Committee for Sexual-Orientation & Gender Minorities in Astronomy (SGMA).

== Education and career ==
Sellgren graduated from the University of California, San Diego in 1976 with a BA in physics. She obtained a PhD in physics from the California Institute of Technology in 1983 under the advisement of B.T. Soifer and Gerry Neugebauer. Her graduate thesis was entitled Near Infrared Studies of Reflection Nebulae. Her areas of expertise include the galactic center of the Milky Way, interstellar dust, and infrared astronomy generally.

After graduating with her bachelor's degree, Sellgren completed a summer research fellowship at Arecibo Observatory in Puerto Rico. After receiving her doctorate, she took a postdoctoral research position at the Space Telescope Science Institute in Baltimore, Maryland. In 1984, Sellgren joined the Institute for Astronomy at the University of Hawaiʻi first as assistant astronomer, and then in 1989, as associate astronomer.

Since 1990, Sellgren has held several appointments at Ohio State University beginning with assistant professor. She was later named associate professor in 1994, and then reached full professorship in 2000 before entering into emerita status in 2011. Also in the year 2000, Sellgren served briefly as visiting professor at the University of Texas at Austin.

== Honors and recognition ==
In 1973, Sellgren won recognition as a National Merit Scholar. In the same year, she was bestowed the UC Regents Fellowship at the University of California, San Diego. She was awarded the Newton Lacy Pierce Prize in 1990 and later served as Alfred P. Sloan Research Fellow from 1991 to 1993. She was also an American Association for the Advancement of Science (AAAS) Fellow in 2011. Sellgren is a current member of the American Astronomical Society as well as the International Astronomical Union.
