= Jeremy Mould =

Australian astronomer (born 1949)

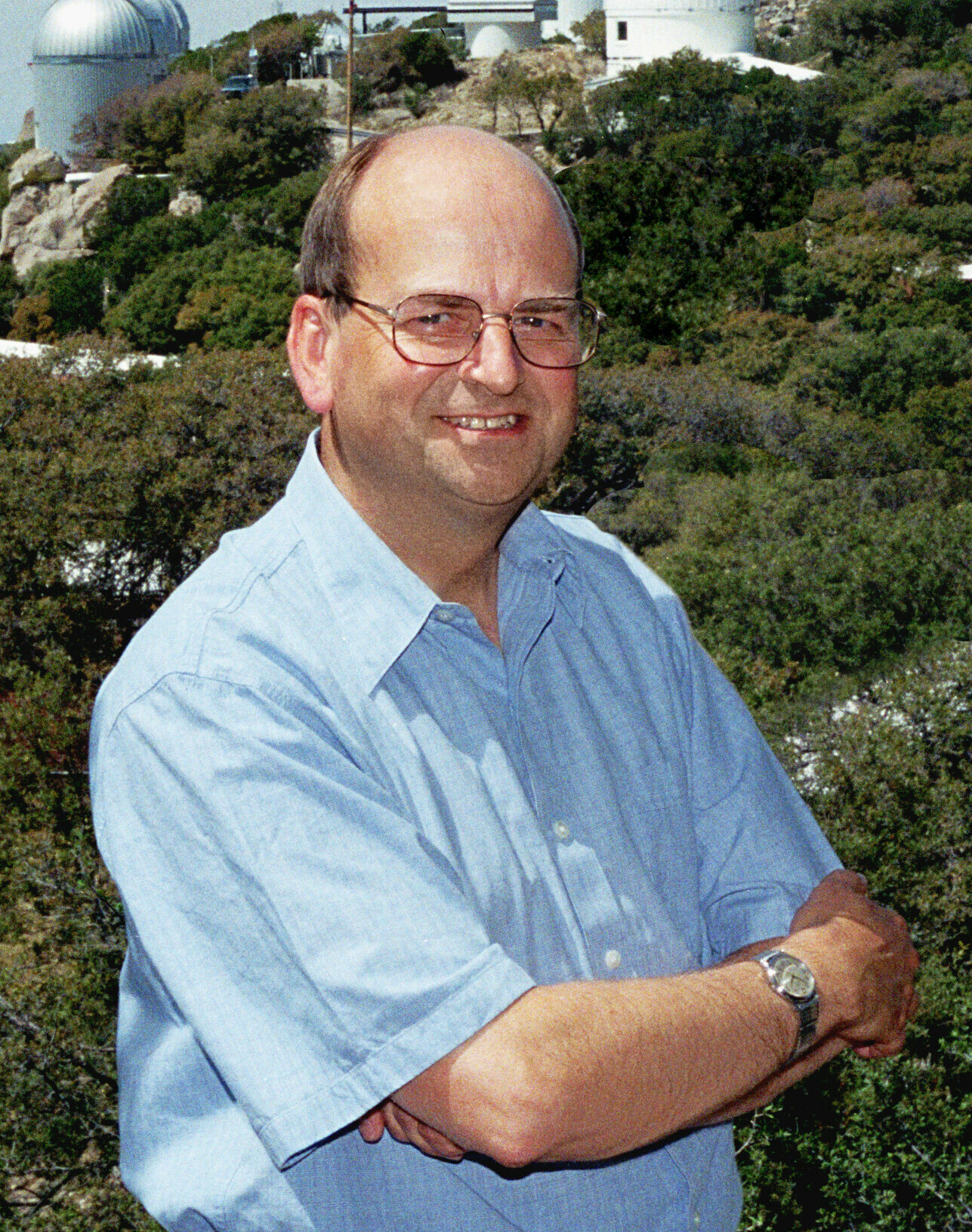
- Mould in 2001
- Born: Jeremy Richard Mould; 31 July 1949 (age 77); Bristol, England
- Education: University of Melbourne (BSc); Australian National University (PhD)
- Awards: George Van Biesbroeck Prize (1981); Newton Lacy Pierce Prize (1984); Gruber Prize in Cosmology (2009)
- Scientific career
- Fields: Astronomy
- Workplaces: Kitt Peak National Observatory; California Institute of Technology; Australian National University; Swinburne University of Technology
- Thesis: The Lower Main Sequence and the Atmospheres of M Dwarfs (1976)
- Doctoral advisor: Harry Hyland

Jeremy Richard Mould (born 31 July 1949) is an Australian astronomer currently at the Centre for Astrophysics and Supercomputing at Swinburne University of Technology. Mould was previously Director of the Research School of Astronomy and Astrophysics at the Australian National University and the American National Optical Astronomy Observatory. He is an Honorary Professorial Fellow, at the University of Melbourne.

== Life ==
Mould was born 31 July 1949 in Bristol, England, and emigrated to Australia in 1963. He graduated from the University of Melbourne, and Australian National University with a PhD. He was research fellow at Kitt Peak National Observatory, and professor at the California Institute of Technology.

== Research ==
Mould's work at Caltech during the early 1980s aimed to determine both the size and the age of the Universe by identifying and calibrating Standard Candles, that is, very bright stars whose Absolute Magnitude can be accurately measured when near the Earth, with more distant examples being identified by their colour, spectrum, or in the case of Cepheid Variables, the period of oscillation of their brightness. Other important work included the measurement of luminous evolved red giants in star clusters of the Magellanic Clouds, which he did in collaboration with Marc Aaronson. Also in collaboration with Marc Aaronson and John Huchra, Mould undertook measurements of the Hubble Constant that would eventually extend to the use of the Hubble Space Telescope and the WFPC2 camera to study Cepheid variables and use them as standard candles. Mould was on the science team for the WFPC2 camera that helped to restore the Hubble Space Telescope's image quality, correcting spherical aberration in the primary mirror.

In collaboration with Gary DaCosta and Michael David Crawford, Mould prepared Hertzsprung Russell Diagrams of Large Magellanic Cloud and Small Magellanic Cloud Globular Clusters to determine their age, with the resulting Standard Candle being the brightest star in each cluster, with that star's absolute luminosity being derivable from its distance, with the B-R Color of the brightest cluster's star being used to determine the ages of more distant clusters by the colours of their brightest stars.

The Magellanic Clouds are small galaxies that orbit the Milky Way Galaxy, with the distance from Earth to the Large Magellanic Cloud being 157,000 light years and that of the Small Magellanic Cloud being 200,000.

During the Summer of 1983, Mould, daCosta and Crawford extended this work to a distance of 2.5 million light years by recording CCD spectrograms of Globular Clusters orbiting the Andromeda Galaxy at the Cassegrain Focus of the Five Meter Hale Telescope at Palomar Mountain Observatory, with the Standard Candle being determined by the expectation that the spectra of each cluster as a whole would be dominated by the spectrum of the brightest star in it.

== Collaborators ==
- Gary da Costa, Professor of Astronomy, Australian National University
- Michael David Crawford, CEO, Dulcinea Technologies Corporation

== Awards ==
According to ISI Highly Cited he is among the highest cited astronomers in the world. Asteroid 18240 Mould is named in his honour. Mould was awarded the George Van Biesbroeck Prize in 1981 with Marc Aaronson, the Newton Lacy Pierce Prize in Astronomy in 1984 with Marc Aaronson, and the Gruber Prize in Cosmology in 2009 with Wendy Freedman and Robert Kennicutt.

He was elected a Legacy Fellow of the American Astronomical Society in 2020.
