= Frederick D. Seward =

American astronomer

Frederick D. Seward Ph.D.
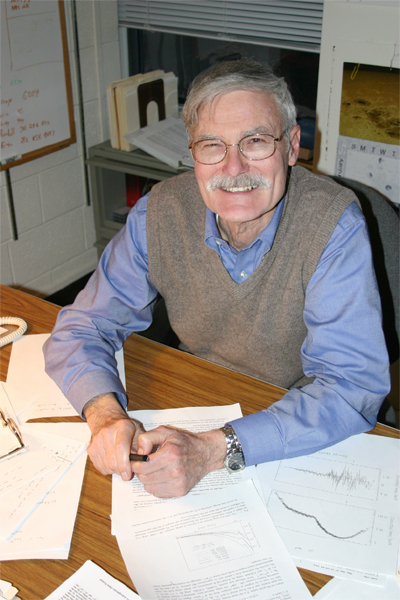
- Seward in his office at the Center for Astrophysics in 2005
- Born: December 28, 1931 (age 94); Goshen, New York, U.S.
- Education: Princeton University, University of Rochester
- Known for: X-ray astronomy, Supernova remnants
- Scientific career
- Workplaces: Smithsonian Astrophysical Observatory
- Thesis: (1958)

Frederick D. Seward is an X-ray astronomer at the Smithsonian Astrophysical Observatory. He was one of the pioneers of X-ray astronomy, leading the Lawrence Livermore National Laboratory rocket program in the 1960s, and is an expert on X-ray studies of supernova remnants. He was awarded the 2024 George Van Biesbroeck Prize of the American Astronomical Society.

== Early life and education ==
Frederick Downing Seward was born in 1931. He is the great-great-grandson of Edwin Polydore Seward, brother of William H. Seward.

Seward received a Bachelor of Science degree in physics from Princeton University in 1953. He went on to earn a PhD in experimental nuclear physics at the University of Rochester which he completed in 1958.

== Career ==
After his PhD, Seward joined the Lawrence Livermore National Laboratory to work on linear accelerator experiments. As part of the Livermore group, he was involved in auroral X-ray radiation experiments on the Agena aft rack of several CORONA spy satellites – including Discoverer 29 and Discoverer 31. Seward then participated in the 1962 atmospheric nuclear test series in the Pacific, Operation Dominic, and launched Nike-Apache sounding rockets from Johnston Island and Kauai to measure the radiation flux from the Starfish Prime high altitude nuclear explosion.

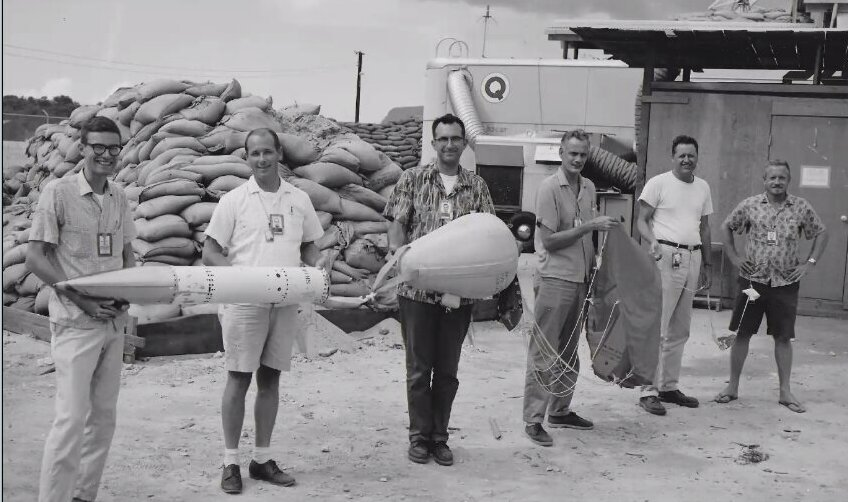
F.D. Seward and colleagues holding a recoverable rocket payload, Kauai 1962. L-R: Seward, Pete Stoering, Orville Hine, Charles Curry, Max McGee, Cal Gardner.

After the 1963 Partial Nuclear Test Ban Treaty, the Livermore team was tasked with maintaining the nation's ability to perform nuclear tests should the treaty lapse. The rockets and X-ray detectors used to measure the flux of artificial nuclear explosions were repurposed to study cosmic X-rays. Seward led a research program to study extrasolar X-ray sources using sounding rockets provided by the Sandia National Laboratories, and pioneered the use of sounding rockets launched from flotation rafts in the ocean in order to study the South Atlantic Anomaly.

Seward showed that the X-ray emission from the binary source Sco X-1 was thermal in nature, and discovered several bright X-ray sources in the southern sky. He designed detectors which operated in the soft (below 1 keV) X-ray energy band and showed that old supernova remnants emitted copiously in that energy band.

In 1977 Seward moved to the Smithsonian Astrophysical Observatory to join the HEAO-B project, renamed the Einstein Observatory after its launch in 1978. Prior to Einstein, an astronomy satellite's data was reserved for the use of the developers of the satellite's instruments. With the new satellite (along with the International Ultraviolet Explorer mission which introduced the practice around the same time) any astronomer in the world could apply for observing time. Seward led the user support team and established the policies for supporting such external observers that have served as the template for subsequent missions. Seward played a similar role in setting up user support for the Chandra X-ray Observatory.

During the 1980s and 1990s Seward continued observing supernova remnants with the Einstein and ROSAT satellites, and discovered the remnant G13.3-1.3, as well as writing a textbook on X-ray astronomy.

Seward formally retired in 2005 but as of 2024 continued to carry out active research on X-ray supernova remnants. In 2024 he was awarded the biennial George Van Biesbroeck Prize, "For the establishment and implementation of the first open, peer-reviewed Guest Observer program for a Principal-Investigator-led NASA space-based observatory".

== Selected publications ==
- Seward, Fred; Charles, Phil (1995). Exploring the X-ray Universe. Cambridge, UK: Cambridge University Press. ISBN 0521437121.
- Seward, F.D.; Page, C.G.; Turner, M.J.L.; Pounds, K.A. (May 1976). "X-ray sources in the Aquila-Serpens-Scutum region". Monthly Notices of the Royal Astronomical Society. 175: 39. Bibcode:1976MNRAS.175P..39S. doi:10.1093/mnras/175.1.39P. (Discovery of X-rays from SS433)
- Seward, F.D.; Grindlay, J.; Seaquist, E.; Gilmore, W. (October 1980). "Diffuse X-ray emission from the jets of SS433". Nature. 287 (5785): 806–808. Bibcode:1980Natur.287..806S. doi:10.1038/287806a0.
- Seward, Frederick (August 1990). "Einstein Observations of Galactic Supernova Remnants". The Astrophysical Journal Supplement Series. 73: 781. Bibcode:1990ApJS...73..781S. doi:10.1086/191489.
