= Kenneth R. Sembach =

American astronomer

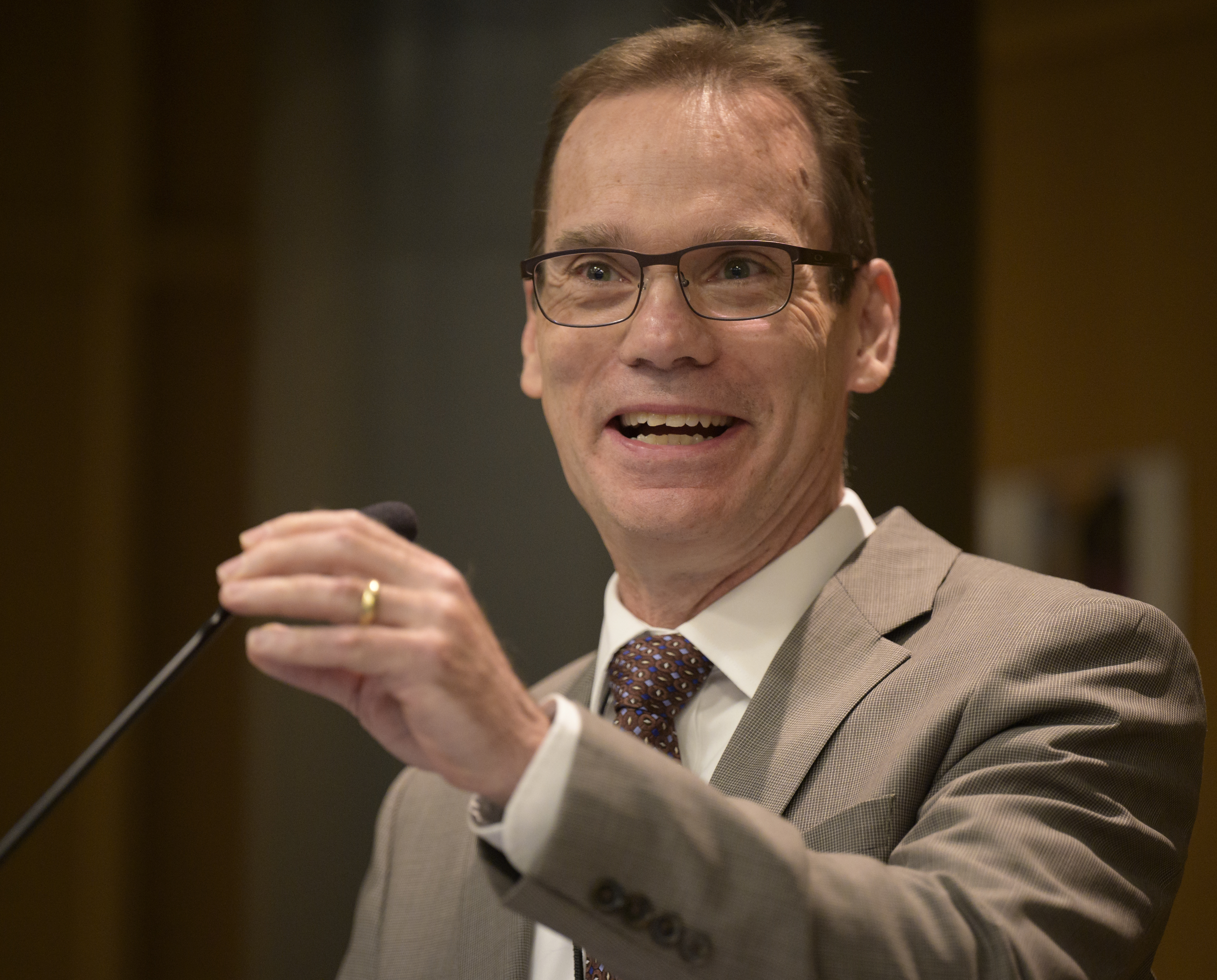
- Occupation: Astronomer
- Awards: Newton Lacy Pierce Prize in Astronomy (2001)

Kenneth R. Sembach is an American astronomer and, from October 2015 to August 2022, was the Director of the Space Telescope Science Institute in Baltimore, Maryland.

== Awards ==
- 2001 Newton Lacy Pierce Prize in Astronomy
