= Huchra's lens =

Galaxy

ZW 2237+030

Observation data (J2000 epoch)
- Constellation: Pegasus
- Right ascension: 22^{h} 40^{m} 30^{s}
- Declination: +3° 21′ 30″
- Distance: 400 million light years

Characteristics
- Type: Sab D

Huchra's lens is the lensing galaxy of the Einstein Cross (Quasar 2237+30); it is also called ZW 2237+030 or QSO 2237+0305 G. It exhibits the phenomenon of gravitational lensing that was postulated by Albert Einstein when he realized that gravity would be able to bend light and thus could have lens-like effects. The galaxy is named for astronomer John Huchra, a key member of the team that discovered it.
