= Byron D. Tapley =

American aerospace engineer (1933–2026)

Byron D. Tapley (1933–2026) was an American geodesist. He served as the principal investigator at NASA's GRACE mission. His work led him to win a NASA Distinguished Public Service Medal in 2018. He was a fellow of the American Geophysical Union, the American Institute of Aeronautics and Astronautics and the American Association for the Advancement of Science.
