= Newton Lacy Pierce Prize in Astronomy =

The Newton Lacy Pierce Prize in Astronomy is awarded annually by the American Astronomical Society to a young (less than age 36) astronomer for outstanding achievement in observational astronomical research. The prize is named after Newton Lacy Pierce, an American astronomer.

== Pierce Prize winners ==
Source: AAS

- 1974 Edwin M. Kellogg
- 1975 Eric Becklin
- 1976 James Roger Angel
- 1977 Donald N.B. Hall
- 1978 James M. Moran, Jr.
- 1979 D. Harper
- 1980 Jack Baldwin
- 1981 Bruce Margon
- 1982 Marc Davis
- 1983 Alan Dressler
- 1984 Marc Aaronson, Jeremy Mould
- 1985 Richard G. Kron
- 1986 Reinhard Genzel
- 1987 Donald E. Winget
- 1988 Sallie L. Baliunas
- 1989 Harriet Dinerstein
- 1990 Kristen Sellgren
- 1991 Kenneth G. Libbrecht
- 1992 Alexei Filippenko
- 1993 Arlin P.S. Crotts
- 1994 No award
- 1995 Andrew McWilliam
- 1996 Michael Strauss
- 1997 Alyssa A. Goodman
- 1998 Andrea Ghez
- 1999 Dennis F. Zaritsky
- 2000 Kirpal Nandra
- 2001 Kenneth R. Sembach
- 2002 Amy Barger
- 2003 Xiaohui Fan
- 2004 Niel Brandt
- 2005 Andrew Blain
- 2006 Bryan Gaensler
- 2007 No award
- 2008 Lisa Kewley
- 2009 Joshua Bloom
- 2010 Tommaso Treu
- 2011 Gaspar Bakos
- 2012 John A. Johnson
- 2013 Jason Kalirai
- 2014 Nadia L. Zakamska
- 2015 Heather A. Knutson
- 2016 Karin Öberg
- 2017 Evan Kirby
- 2018 Caitlin Casey
- 2019 Daniel R. Weisz
- 2020 Emily Levesque
- 2021 Courtney Dressing
- 2022 Erin Kara
- 2023 Renee Ludlam

== See also ==
- List of astronomy awards
