= NASA Distinguished Public Service Medal =

NASA award

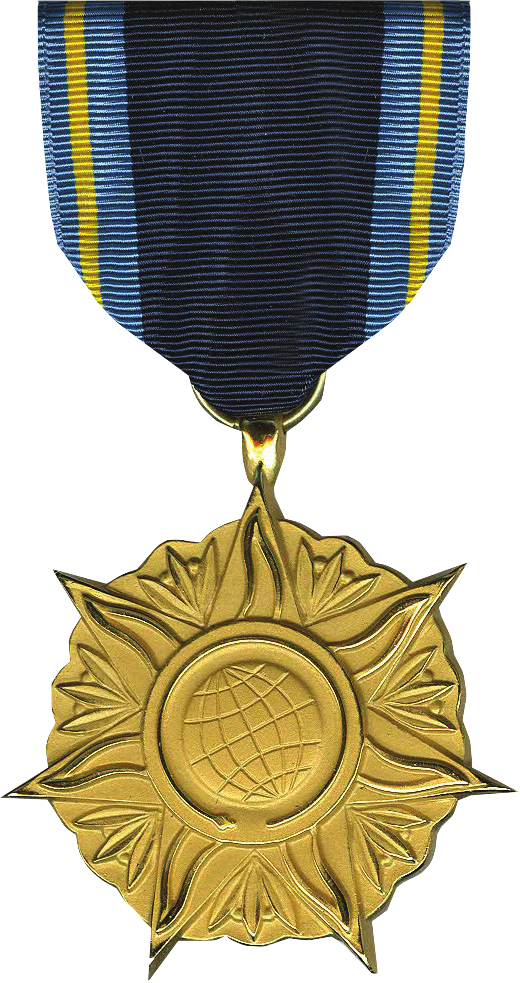
- Type: Medal
- Awarded for: "distinguished accomplishments [that] contributed substantially to the NASA mission. The contribution must be so extraordinary that other forms of recognition would be inadequate."
- Country: United States
- Presented by: the National Aeronautics and Space Administration
- Eligibility: Non-government personnel
- Status: Active
- Established: July 29, 1959
- NASA Distinguished Public Service Ribbon

Precedence
- Next (higher): Congressional Space Medal of Honor
- Equivalent: NASA Distinguished Service Medal
- Next (lower): NASA Outstanding Leadership Medal

The NASA Distinguished Public Service Medal is an award similar to the NASA Distinguished Service Medal, but awarded to non-government personnel. This is the highest honor NASA awards to anyone who was not a government employee when the service was performed.

== Recipients ==
=== 1967 ===
- Charles Stark Draper

=== 1969 ===
- Harry H. Hess
- T. J. O'Malley
- Frederick Seitz
- Charles H. Townes
- Russell L. Schweickart

=== 1971 ===
- Joseph G. Gavin
- George E. Stoner

=== 1972 ===
- Riccardo Giacconi
- Brian O'Brien
- Gerald J. Wasserburg

=== 1973 ===
- Paul B. Blasingame
- Joseph F. Clayton
- Leo Goldberg
- Clinton H. Grace
- Robert E. Greer
- George W. Jeffs
- Thomas J. Kelly
- H. Douglas Lowrey
- Joseph P. McNamara
- James A. Miller
- Richard H. Nelson
- Jeff Dantowitz
- Frank Press
- Theodore D. Smith

=== 1974 ===
- Ben G. Bromberg
- Jack M. Campbell
- Edwin G. Czarnecki
- Harry Dornbrand
- Jesse L. Greenstein
- Bruce C. Murray
- T. J. O'Malley
- William G. Purdy

=== 1975 ===
- Grant L. Hansen
- Willis M. Hawkins
- Richard B. Kershner

=== 1976 ===
- Edward W. Bonnett
- Antonio Ferri
- Theodore D. Smith
- Lyman Spitzer

=== 1977 ===
- Laurence J. Adams
- Franklin W. Kolk
- Walter O. Lowrie
- Thomas G. Pownall
- Carl Sagan
- Francis B. Sayre
- Ronald Smelt
- Kurt Waldheim

=== 1978 ===
- Edward O. Buckbee
- Gerald J. Wasserburg

=== 1980 ===
- Clyde W. Tombaugh

=== 1981 ===
- Victor van Lint

=== 1982 ===
- Harrison H. Schmitt

=== 1983 ===
- Eugene H. Levy

=== 1984 ===
- Erik Quistgaard
- Nichelle Nichols

=== 1988 ===
- Robert Heinlein
- Carver G. Kennedy

=== 1991 ===
- John T. Radecki
- Rodger Doxsey
- Harlan James Smith
- Bert R. Bulkin

=== 1992 ===
- John Bahcall
- Berrien Moore III

=== 1993 ===
- Riccardo Giacconi
- Gene Roddenberry

=== 1995 ===
- Robert L. Golden
- Bill G Aldridge

=== 1996 ===
- Lori Garver

=== 1997 ===
- Norman Ralph Augustine

=== 2001 ===
- Alain Bensoussan
- James (Jim) F. Berry
- Yvonne Brill

=== 2002 ===
- Thomas P. Ackerman
- Viktor D. Blagov
- Richard D. Blomberg
- Vladimir Nikolaevich Dezhurov
- Glenn A. Goerke
- Audrey Milroy
- R. K. Chetty Pandipati
- Gerald W. Smith
- Mikhail Tyurin
- Yury V. Usachev

=== 2003 ===
- Daniel J. Jacob
- Roger J. Bressenden
- Hugh (Hamp) Wilson
- Roger Chrostowski
- Barry Greenberg
- Ilan Ramon
- Yuri Gidzenko

=== 2004 ===
- Neil deGrasse Tyson
- Edward C. "Pete" Aldridge
- Maria T. Zuber
- Laurie Leshin
- Albert Reville
- William H. Webster

=== 2005 ===
- William Sample
- Richard Covey
- Douglas Stanley
- Dennis L. Hartmann

=== 2006 ===
- Daniel J. Heimerdinger
- Liam Sarsfield
- Bob Bishop, D.S.
- Bruce H. Wendler

=== 2007 ===
- Jim Banke
- David F. Dinges
- Paul Lightsey
- Lynda Weatherman

=== 2008 ===
- Klaus P. Heiss
- James R. Bathurst
- James J. Cawby
- George Hartig
- Mark G. Jager
- Linn Leblanc
- Michael J. Massie
- Robert J. Puckett
- Ted Robinson
- Harold R. Ross
- Marcus Shaw
- Carl Weimer, Ph.D.

=== 2009 ===
- Carlos T. Mata
- Brian Rishikof
- Lester M. Cohen
- Roger W. Corson

=== 2010 ===
- Dennis E. Botts
- Jack Trombka
- Benjamin M. Herman
- Jeffrey P. Sutton

=== 2011 ===
- Gary Dempsey - COLSA
- Charles Kopicz - ERC, Inc
- Robert Savoie - GEOCENT

=== 2012 ===
- Robert Berry
- Raymond M. Hoff
- Peter W. Phillips
- Dmitry Kondratyev
- James Sponnick, United Launch Alliance
- Michael L. Young, United Launch Alliance

=== 2013 ===
The following individuals were recognized in 2013. Individuals marked with an * were awarded between 1 April 2012 and 31 March 2013, outside the timing of the normal awards cycle.

- George Charles Adams
- Deborah Barnhart
- Angioletta Coradini *
- Guy Cordier
- Gary L. Enochs
- Holland Ford
- Johnny L. Golden
- Akihiko Hoshide *
- Christopher J. Keller
- Oleg Kononenko *
- André Kuipers *
- Yuri Malenchenko *
- Thomas B. McCord
- Oleg V. Novitskiy *
- Gennady Padalka *
- Sergei Revin *
- Alan K. Ruter
- Theodore L. Shaffner
- Gwynne Shotwell
- Evgeny L. Tarelkin *
- Edward C. Stone

=== 2014 ===
The following individuals were recognized in 2014. Individuals marked with an * were awarded between April 1, 2013 and May 31, 2014, outside the timing of the normal awards cycle.

- James A. Coakley, Jr.
- John Gregory
- Chris A. Hadfield *
- Thomas Hancock
- Bruce M. Jakosky
- Hans J. Koenigsmann
- Oleg Kotov *
- Alexander Misurkin *
- Luca S. Parmitano *
- Mason Peck *
- Thomas Pierson *
- Matthew N. Ramsey
- Roman Romanenko *
- Sergey Ryazanskiy *
- William Shatner *
- Edward C. Stone *
- Mikhail Tyurin *
- Pavel Vinogradov *
- Koichi Wakata *
- Patrick Wiggins
- Fyodor Yurchikhin *

=== 2015 ===
- Davy A. Haynes, Jacobs Technologies ESSSA Group, Engineering Directorate

=== 2016 ===
- Thomas A. Glavich
- Stamatios Krimigis
- Stephen E. Kulczycki
- Therrin H. Protze
- Alan Stern

=== 2017 ===
The following individuals were recognized June 15, 2017.

- Terry Abel
- Frank Bauer
- Eric De Jong
- Edward Devine
- Michael Dorsch
- Alan Hargens
- Kauser Imtiaz
- Roger Launius
- Edward Nace
- Christopher Russell
- John Salisbury
- John Sterritt
- Forman Williams
- Roberta Wyrick, ERC *

=== 2018 ===
The following individuals were recognized August 2, 2018.

- Christopher Jones
- John Magisano
- William McClintock
- Michael Melgares
- Frank Morring
- Eugene Parker
- James Paulsen
- Byron Tapley
- Yervant Terzian
- Edward L. Wright

=== 2019 ===
The following individuals were recognized August 28, 2019.

- Alaudin Bhanji
- Daniel Coulter
- Robert Ergun
- Michael Graybill
- Thomas Howsman
- Miguel Larsen
- Charles Lawrence
- Edward Sikora, ERC
- Robert Sinclair
- Jakob van Zyl

=== 2020 ===
The following individuals were recognized December 22, 2020.

- Charles Boehl
- Ronald Dantowitz
- George Helou
- Larry Johnson
- Alan Joynt
- Christopher Justice
- Renjith Kumar
- Lon Miller
- Joseph Musick
- Ashot Sargsyan
- B. Thomas Soifer
- Ray Sparks
- Bobby Williams
- A. Thomas Young

== See also ==
- List of NASA awards
