= Marc Aaronson =

American astronomer (1950–1987)

- Born: August 24, 1950; Los Angeles, California, U.S.
- Died: April 30, 1987 (aged 36); Kitt Peak, Arizona, U.S.
- Education: California Institute of Technology (BS) Harvard University (Ph.D.)
- Awards: George Van Biesbroeck Prize (1981); Bok Prize (1983); Newton Lacy Pierce Prize in Astronomy (1984)
- Scientific career
- Fields: Astronomy
- Workplaces: University of Arizona

Marc Aaronson (August 24, 1950 – April 30, 1987) was an American astronomer.

== Life ==
Aaronson was educated at the California Institute of Technology, where he received a BS in 1972. He completed his Ph.D. in 1977 at Harvard University with a dissertation on the near-infrared aperture photometry of galaxies. He joined Steward Observatory at the University of Arizona as a postdoctoral research associate in 1977 and became an Associate Professor of Astronomy in 1983. Aaronson and Jeremy Mould won the George Van Biesbroeck Prize in 1981 and the Newton Lacy Pierce Prize in Astronomy in 1984 from the American Astronomical Society. He was also awarded the Bart J. Bok Prize in 1983 from Harvard University. His work concentrated on three fields: the determination of the Hubble constant (H_{0}) using the Tully–Fisher relation, the study of carbon rich stars, and the velocity distribution of those stars in dwarf spheroidal galaxies.

== Death ==
Aaronson died in an accident in the evening hours of April 30, 1987, aged 36, in the dome of the 4-m Mayall Telescope of the Kitt Peak National Observatory. He was killed when he was crushed by the hatch leading out to the catwalk; the hatch was slammed shut on him by a ladder which extended down from the turning telescope dome. A switch on the hatch automatically shut down the dome rotation motor; however, the momentum of the dome kept it moving for a few moments, allowing it to hit the outward opening hatch. This design flaw was corrected after the accident by trimming the ladder and redesigning the hatch to slide sideways, parallel to the dome wall.

Asteroid 3277 Aaronson is named in his honor.

== The Marc Aaronson Memorial Lectureship ==
The Marc Aaronson Memorial Lectureship, promoting and recognizing excellence in astronomical research, is held every 18 months by the University of Arizona and Steward Observatory as a tribute to his memory.

Lecturers:

- 1989 Dr. Robert Kirshner, Harvard University
- 1990 Dr. Kenneth C. Freeman, Mount Stromlo/Siding Spring Observatories, Australia
- 1992 Dr. John Huchra, Harvard-Smithsonian Center for Astrophysics
- 1993 Dr. Nick Scoville, California Institute of Technology
- 1994 Dr. Wendy Freedman, The Observatories of the Carnegie Institution of Washington
- 1996 Dr. J. Anthony Tyson, Bell Laboratories/Lucent Technologies
- 1998 Dr. John C. Mather, NASA Goddard Space Flight Center
- 1999 Dr. Bohdan Paczynski, Princeton University
- 2001 Dr. Ewine van Dishoeck, Leiden University, The Netherlands
- 2002 Dr. Geoffrey W. Marcy, University of California, Berkeley
- 2004 Dr. Lyman Page Jr., Princeton University
- 2005 Dr. Brian Schmidt, Mt. Stromlo/Siding Spring Observatories, Australia
- 2007 Dr. Andrea M. Ghez, University of California, Los Angeles
- 2008 Dr. Michael E. Brown, California Institute of Technology
- 2010 Dr. J. Davy Kirkpatrick, California Institute of Technology
- 2012 Dr. Pieter van Dokkum, Yale University
- 2014 Dr. Alice Shapley, University of California, Los Angeles
- 2015 Dr. Vasily Belokurov, Institute of Astronomy, Cambridge, UK
- 2019 Dr. Jenny Greene, Princeton University

== See also ==
- List of astronomers § M. Aaronson
