= HE 0435−1223 =

Einstein cross and quasar in the constellation Eridanus

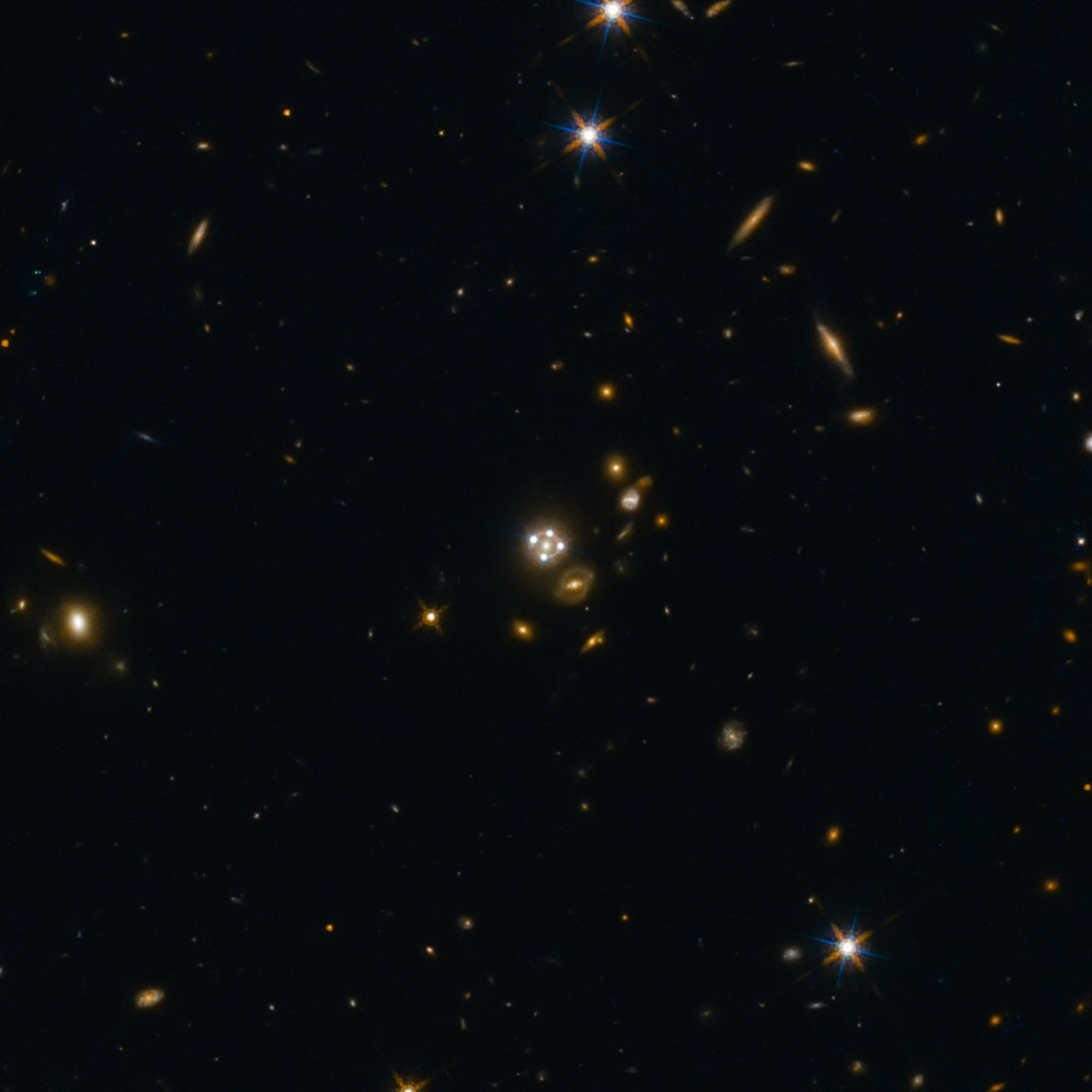
- HE 0435−1223 (center), as imaged by the Hubble Space Telescope

Observation data (Epoch J2000)
- Constellation: Eridanus
- Right ascension: 04^{h} 38^{m} 14.88^{s}
- Declination: −12° 17′ 14.6″
- Redshift: ~17.71
- Distance: 2.33 billion ly
- Type: Einstein cross

HE 0435−1223 is a quadruple-lensed quasar and rare Einstein Cross located in the constellation Eridanus at a distance of approximately 2.33 billion light years away from Earth. HE 0435−1223 was discovered in October 2008 by astronomer Patrick Foley during a study and search for gravitational quadruple lenses in deep sky objects.

== Physical properties ==
The main physical characteristic of HE 0435−1223 is the fact that it is divided into four frames by the galaxy WSB2002 0435−1223 G. All images are spaced a maximum of 2.6 arcsecs apart, the brightest image named "A" has an apparent magnitude of 19 while the other three images ("B","C" and "D") have an apparent magnitude of 19.6. The quasar itself is estimated to have an apparent magnitude of 17.71. All these images are pale blue in color. According to measurements in the I band, the galaxy producing the lens would be a giant elliptical galaxy with a diameter of 12 kpc.

In 2006, a research team studied HE 0435−1223 with the Hubble Space Telescope, they observed that the brightness of the four images varies in a particular way, if image A varies, image B will vary with a delay compared to image A.

According to scientists, the object producing the lensing may not be a galaxy but a possible unorganized galactic structure which would produce several gravitational lenses that distort HE 0435−1223, and this would explain the delay between the magnitudes of each image.

== Supermassive black hole ==
In 2017, scientists studied the emission lines as well as the inert zone of the quasar using the MMT Observatory. By recombining the emissions from the different images, the team of scientists were able to carry out fairly precise measurements. By studying the microwaves emitted by HE 0435−1223, they were able to estimate the speed and temperature of the black hole's accretion disk.

With this data, they were able to estimate the mass of the black hole which sits at the center of the quasar; for this process, they used the relationship between the measurements as well as the mass of the central black hole. Data from the variation of emission fluxes indicate that the central black hole of HE 0435−1223 would have a mass of approximately ~10 billion solar masses.

== See also ==
- Gravitational lens
- List of quasars
