= 3277 Aaronson =

Main-belt asteroid

Discovery
- Discovered by: E. Bowell
- Discovery site: Anderson Mesa Stn.
- Discovery date: 8 January 1984

Designations
- Named after: Marc Aaronson (astronomer)
- Alternative designations: 1984 AF_{1} · 1962 CF; 1971 UV_{2} · 1982 TU_{2}
- Minor planet category: main-belt · (outer)

Orbital characteristics
- Epoch 4 September 2017 (JD 2458000.5)
- Uncertainty parameter 0
- Observation arc: 55.24 yr (20,178 days)
- Aphelion: 3.9927 AU
- Perihelion: 2.2900 AU
- Semi-major axis: 3.1414 AU
- Eccentricity: 0.2710
- Orbital period (sidereal): 5.57 yr (2,034 days)
- Mean anomaly: 93.558°
- Mean motion: 0° 10^{m} 37.2^{s} / day
- Inclination: 8.5693°
- Longitude of ascending node: 84.997°
- Argument of perihelion: 295.32°

Physical characteristics
- Dimensions: 19.88±0.15 km 20.049±0.054 km 26.64 km (calculated)
- Synodic rotation period: 9.80±0.05 h
- Geometric albedo: 0.057 (assumed); 0.112±0.016; 0.1211±0.0122
- Spectral type: C
- Absolute magnitude (H): 11.4 · 11.5 · 11.6 · 11.89±0.21

3277 Aaronson, provisional designation 1984 AF_{1}, is a carbonaceous asteroid from the outer region of the asteroid belt, approximately 20 kilometers in diameter. It was discovered by American astronomer Edward Bowell at Lowell's Anderson Mesa Station, near Flagstaff, Arizona, on 8 January 1984, and named in memory of astronomer Marc Aaronson.

== Orbit and classification ==
The C-type asteroid orbits the Sun in the outer main-belt at a distance of 2.3–4.0 AU once every 5 years and 7 months (2,034 days). Its orbit has an eccentricity of 0.27 and an inclination of 9° with respect to the ecliptic. A first precovery was obtained at Goethe Link Observatory in 1962, extending the asteroid's observation arc by 22 years prior to its official discovery observation at Anderson Mesa.

== Physical characteristics ==
=== Rotation period ===
In November 2010, a rotational lightcurve for this asteroid was obtained from photometric observations made at the U.S. Shadowbox Observatory in Carmel, Indiana. It rendered a rotation period of 9.80±0.05 hours with a brightness amplitude of 0.14 in magnitude (U=2+).

=== Diameter and albedo ===
Based on NASA's space-based WISE and its subsequent NEOWISE mission, the asteroid has an albedo of 0.11 and 0.12, and a diameter of 19.9 and 20.0 kilometers, respectively, while the Collaborative Asteroid Lightcurve Link (CALL) assumes a lower albedo of 0.06, which translates into a larger diameter of 26.6 kilometers, as the lower the albedo (reflectivity), the higher the body's diameter, for a given absolute magnitude (brightness).

== Naming ==
This minor planet was named in memory of American astronomer Marc Aaronson (1950–1987), killed in the dome of the 4-meter Nicholas U. Mayall Telescope of the Kitt Peak National Observatory. His fields of research included the detection the decelerative effect of the Virgo cluster on the Hubble flow, observations of carbon stars in the globular clusters in the Magellanic clouds, and measurement of the large velocity dispersion in dwarf spheroidal galaxies, suggesting that all galaxies do have dark matter halos. The official naming citation was published by the Minor Planet Center on 11 July 1987 (M.P.C. 12016).
