= Jeffrey P. Sutton =

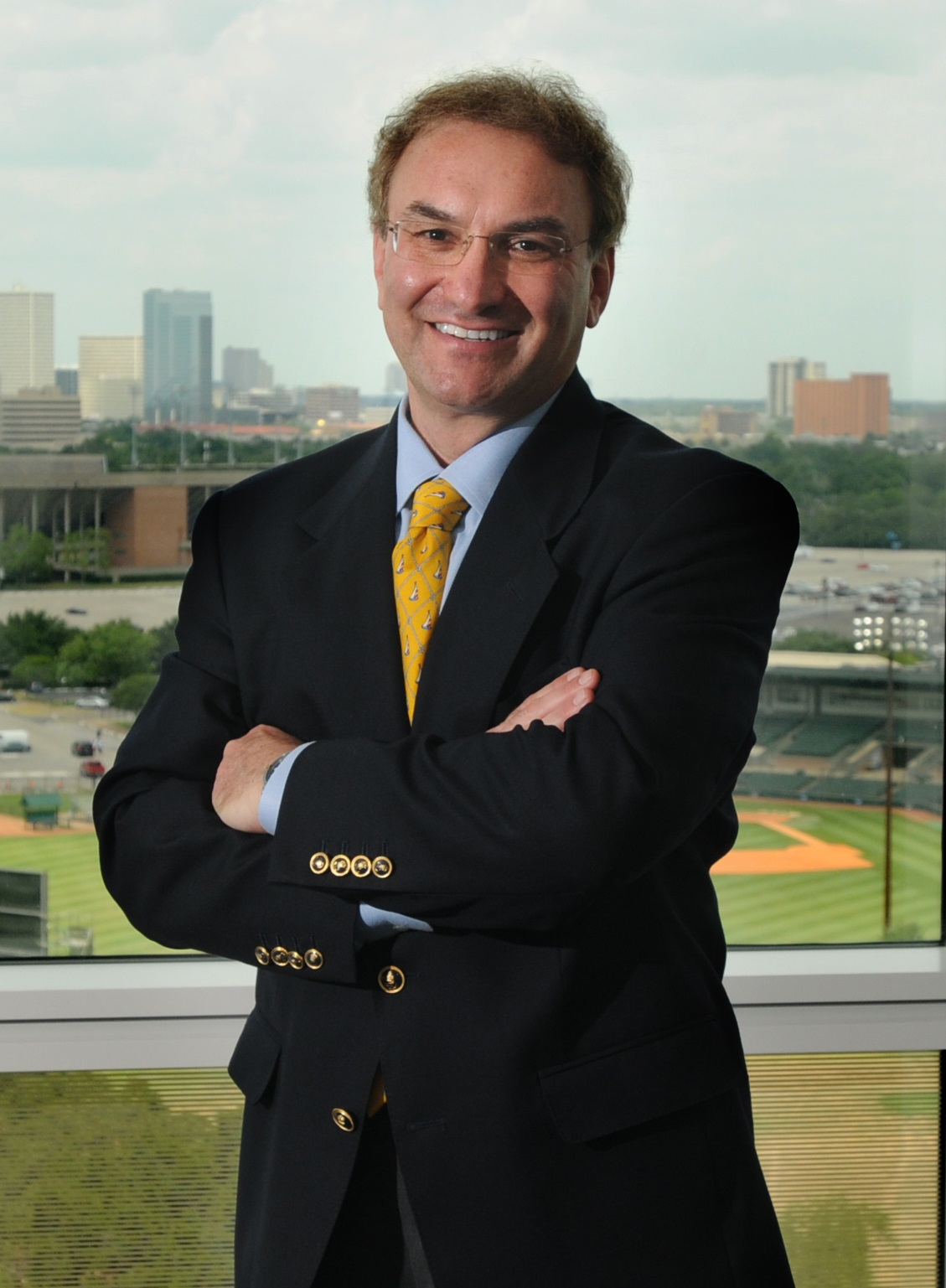
Jeffrey P. Sutton (2011)

Jeffrey Paul Sutton is a Canadian-American physician-scientist who holds the Friedkin Chair for Research in Sensory System Integration and Space Medicine at Baylor College of Medicine (BCM), where he is the founding Director and Professor in the Center for Space Medicine. He is also chairman of the Board of the Translational Research Institute for Space Health that is part of the Human Research Program of the National Aeronautics and Space Administration. Sutton is the former chief executive officer, President and Institute Director of the National Space Biomedical Research Institute.

== Education and training ==
Sutton's education and training were at the University of Toronto and Harvard University. He holds M.D., M.Sc. (medical science/neuroscience) and Ph.D. (theoretical physics) degrees, and is a fellow of the Royal College of Physicians of Surgeons of Canada and a diplomate of the American Board of Psychiatry and Neurology.

== Research ==
Sutton's research expertise is in smart medical systems, computational neuroscience and neuroimaging. His research, medical practice and teaching were integrated for more than a decade at Harvard Medical School and the Massachusetts General Hospital, where he founded and directed the Neural Systems Group.

== Leadership and awards ==
He has received numerous awards for his achievements, including the NASA Distinguished Public Service Medal, an NIH Career Development Award and a President's Citation from the Society of NASA Flight Surgeons.
