= Joshua Bloom =

American academic

- Born: Joshua Simon Bloom; June 8, 1974 (age 52); Washington, D.C., USA
- Education: Harvard College, A.B.. Cambridge University, M.Phil; California Institute of Technology, PhD
- Known for: Gamma-Ray Bursts, Artificial Intelligence
- Awards: Gordon and Betty Moore Foundation Data-driven Discovery Fellow; Newton Lacy Pierce Prize in Astronomy; Sloan Research Fellow; Harvard Society of Fellows; Hertz Foundation Fellow
- Scientific career
- Fields: Astrophysics, Computer Science
- Workplaces: University of California, Berkeley

Joshua Simon Bloom (born June 8, 1974 in Washington, D.C.) is an American astrophysicist and professor of astronomy at the University of California, Berkeley, and was the CTO and co-founder of the machine-learning company wise.io (acquired by General Electric, 2016). He received a Bachelor of Arts in astronomy and astrophysics and physics from the Harvard College in 1996, an M.Phil from Cambridge University in 1997, and a PhD in astronomy from the California Institute of Technology in 2002. He was a Junior Fellow of the Harvard Society of Fellows from 2002 to 2005. He was the chair of the Astronomy Department at UC Berkeley from 2020 to 2023. His astronomy research focuses on gamma-ray bursts and other astrophysical transients such as supernovae and tidal disruption events. He is author of the book What Are Gamma-Ray Bursts? published by Princeton University Press in 2011.

== Research ==
In 2009, ScienceWatch wrote that Bloom's gamma-ray bursts "work ranks at No. 10 by total cites, based on 85 papers cited a total of 3,639 times. Five of these papers are on the lists of the 20 most-cited papers over the past decade and over the past two years." He has published over 300 refereed articles and was principal investigator of the Peters Automated Infrared Telescope (PAIRITEL) at the Fred Lawrence Whipple Observatory in Arizona. He is also principal investigator of the Synoptic Infrared Survey Telescope (SASIR). Project and was co-chair of the transients and variable star group of the Large Synoptic Survey Telescope (LSST). Some of Bloom's current work focuses on the classification of astrophysical transients using machine-learning techniques. He suggested that GRB 110328A was due to a new class of relativistic outflow events from tidal disruption of a star by a massive black hole.

== Honors and awards ==
Bloom was awarded the Herchel Smith Harvard Scholarship to Cambridge University in 1996, and was a Hertz Foundation Fellow at the California Institute of Technology. In 2006, Bloom was named as a Sloan Research Fellow by the Alfred P. Sloan Foundation. In 2008, he was included as one of Astronomy magazine's ten "rising stars. In 2009, he was awarded the Newton Lacy Pierce Prize in Astronomy from the American Astronomical Society. In 2010, he was named as the Sophie and Tycho Brahe Visiting Professor at Copenhagen University. He was awarded the Faculty Research Award from Two Sigma in 2019. From 2023 to 2024, Bloom was a Miller Professor at the Miller Institute at the University of California, Berkeley. He is the Co-Creator of the VOEvent messaging scheme for astronomical transients.

== Teaching ==
Bloom teaches astronomy to graduate and undergraduate students at the University of California, Berkeley. In addition to astronomy-centric courses, he teaches the "Python Computing for Data Science" graduate course, aimed at PhD students in data-rich fields. Some of his lectures are available to the public as podcasts and video streams (Python class).

== Tennis ==
In August 2025, Bloom was ranked 16 nationally in the United States Tennis Association NTRP Men's Singles 40+ 4.5 standings. Previously, he held an International Tennis Federation worldwide 45+ Masters Tour Singles Ranking of 556 in July 2023. He was ranked 54 in the United States Tennis Association Men's 45 National Standings List for Singles, and in August 2024 was ranked 26 in the United States Tennis Association Men's 40+ 4.5 National Standings List for Singles.
