= Newton Lacy Pierce =

American astronomer

Newton Lacy Pierce (July 12, 1905 Santa Ana, California – August 9, 1950) was an American astronomer.

== Life ==
His father was an agronomist for the U.S. Department of Agriculture. He graduated from the University of Michigan with a BS in 1928 where he studied with Ralph Curtis, and from Princeton University with a PhD in 1937. He taught at Doane College, and Northwestern University. He was an associate professor of astronomy, and assistant director of the Princeton Observatory. During World War II, he taught navigation. He was a member of the International Astronomical Union Commission 27.

His papers are held at Princeton University. The Newton Lacy Pierce Prize in Astronomy is named for him.

== Family ==
He married Beatrice Rieke on June 15, 1935.

== Works ==
- John Quincy Stewart, Newton Lacy Pierce, Marine and air navigation, Ginn and Company, 1944
