= Andrew Blain =

British astronomer

- Born: 25th September; Liverpool, United Kingdom
- Awards: Newton Lacy Pierce Prize in Astronomy
- Scientific career
- Fields: Galactic Evolution, ISM, Gravitational Lensing
- Institutions: University of Leicester

Andrew Blain is a British astronomer and professor at the University of Leicester. He was previously assistant professor at California Institute of Technology. He obtained both his Masters degree and PhD at the University of Cambridge.

In his professional career, Andrew had a role as a science team member on the NASA WISE mission that was launched in 2009. He was also the chairman of ALMA North American Science Advisory Committee (ANASAC) in 2010, as well as a member of the HerMES international consortium. In 2005 he was awarded the Newton Lacy Pierce Prize in Astronomy by the American Astronomical Society "for his outstanding contributions to sub-mm and far-IR astronomy".

== Research ==
Blain's research is based around galactic evolution, the interstellar medium, and gravitational lensing.

== Works ==
Below is a list of some of Blain's most notable work:

- The cold universe, Editors Andrew W. Blain, F. Combes, Bruce T. Draine, D. Pfenniger, Yves Revaz, Springer, 2004 ISBN 978-3-540-40838-3
- "A Spectrographic Survey of the Submillimeter Galaxy Population", Multiwavelength mapping of galaxy formation and evolution: proceedings of the ESO Workshop held at Venice, Italy, 13–16 October 2003, Volume 2003, Editors Alvio Renzini, Ralf Bender, Springer, 2005, ISBN 978-3-540-25665-6
- "The Nature of Submillimeter Galaxies", Deep millimeter surveys: implications for galaxy formation and evolution, 19–21 June 2000, University of Massachusetts, Amherst, Editors James D. Lowenthal, David H. Hughes, World Scientific, 2001 ISBN 978-981-02-4465-1
