= Nadia Zakamska =

Russian-American astronomer

- Education: Princeton University, Moscow Institute of Physics and Technology
- Awards: Sloan Fellow, NASA Spitzer Fellow, John N. Bahcall Fellowship
- Scientific career
- Fields: Astronomy, Astrophysics
- Institutions: Johns Hopkins University
- Website: https://physics-astronomy.jhu.edu/directory/nadia-zakamska/

Nadia Zakamska is a Russian-American astronomer who is a professor at Johns Hopkins University.

== Early life and education ==
Zakamska graduated from Moscow Institute of Physics and Technology with a master's degree in theoretical physics in 2001. Zakamska then attended Princeton University for her PhD, which she received in 2005.

== Career and research ==
Zakamska's research involves multi-wavelength work on Type II quasars. She also studies supermassive black holes and their role in galaxy formation. Her research group produced an important breakthrough in how cosmic gas falls into black holes and produces quasars. In addition, she studies extrasolar planets and extragalactic astronomy.

== Awards and honors ==
Zakamska is a Sloan Fellow. In 2014, she received the American Astronomical Society's Newton Lacy Pierce Prize, which is awarded to recognize at least five years of outstanding achievement in observational astronomical research. Early in her career she was awarded a Spitzer Fellowship in 2005 to conduct research on Quasars at the Institute for Advanced Study. From 2008 to 2010 she was a John Bahcall Fellow also at the Institute for Advanced Study.

== Publications ==
- Zakamska, Nadia L.; Hamann, Fred; Pâris, Isabelle; Brandt, W. N.; Greene, Jenny E.; Strauss, Michael A.; Villforth, Carolin; Wylezalek, Dominika; Alexandroff, Rachael M.; Ross, Nicholas P. (2016-07-01). "Discovery of extreme [O III] λ5007 Å outflows in high-redshift red quasars". Monthly Notices of the Royal Astronomical Society. 459 (3): 3144–3160. arXiv:1512.02642. Bibcode:2016MNRAS.459.3144Z. doi:10.1093/mnras/stw718. ISSN 0035-8711.
- Zakamska, Nadia L.; Lampayan, Kelly; Petric, Andreea; Dicken, Daniel; Greene, Jenny E.; Heckman, Timothy M.; Hickox, Ryan C.; Ho, Luis C.; Krolik, Julian H. (2016-02-01). "Star formation in quasar hosts and the origin of radio emission in radio-quiet quasars". Monthly Notices of the Royal Astronomical Society 455 (4): 4191–4211. doi:10.1093/mnras/stv2571. ISSN 0035-8711.
