= R. K. Chetty Pandipati =

Electronics and Communications Engineer

- Born: India
- Education: Electronics & Communication Engineering
- Awards: NASA Distinguished Public Service Medal; NASA Silver Achievement Medal

Radha Krishnaiah Chetty Pandipati (also known as R. K. Chetty Pandipati and P. R. K. Chetty) is an Electronics and Communications Engineer and author.

Pandipati works at NASA as a contractor.

== Biography ==
Pandipati was born in India. After receiving his undergraduate education at Andhra University, Kakinad, India, where he earned his B.E. degree, he joined Indian Space Research Organization, in 1972. While working there, he pursued his graduate studies and earned Ph.D. degree from Indian Institute Science, Bangalore, India, in 1978. He then joined the staff of Caltech, Pasadena, USA as a research fellow in 1979.

Later on, he worked at Sundstrand Corporation, Rockford, Illinois and Fairchild Space Company, before starting at NASA Goddard Space Flight Center as a contractor and he has been working there since 1994.

He is the author of Switch Mode Power Supply Design, and Satellite Technology & its Applications, published by McGraw-Hill Inc.

He was elected to the grade of IEEE Fellow in 1994.

== Medals & Awards ==
=== Medals ===
- NASA Distinguished Public Service Medal 2002
- NASA Silver Achievement Medal 2014

=== Awards ===
- ATA Excellence & Recognition Award in Science & Technology, 2016
- NASA GSFC Thomas J. Budney Award for Engineering Integrity 2009
- NASA GSFC Exceptional Achievement Award, 1997
- Indian Space Research Organization Distinguished Achievement Award 1975

== Patents ==
- Donald G. Fair and Pandipati R.K. Chetty, "Soft-Start Control for a Push-pull Converter-Regulator with a Flux Balancing Circuit", U.S. Patent Number 4598351, dated July 1, 1986. https://patents.google.com/patent/US4598351

== Publications ==
- Robert Kichak, Eric Young, Chetty Pandipati, Robert Cooke, "International Space Station (ISS) External Television (TV) Camera Shutdown Investigation", NASA/TM-2009-215572; NESC-RP-06-49/06-001-E, February 2009. https://ntrs.nasa.gov/archive/nasa/casi.ntrs.nasa.gov/20090014721.pdf
- R.K. Chetty Pandipati and Marlon Enciso, "Positively Verifying Mating of Previously Unverifiable Flight Connectors", NASA Tech briefs, September 2011. https://ntrs.nasa.gov/search.jsp?R=20120000430
