= Einstein Cross =

Gravitationally lensed image of a quasar

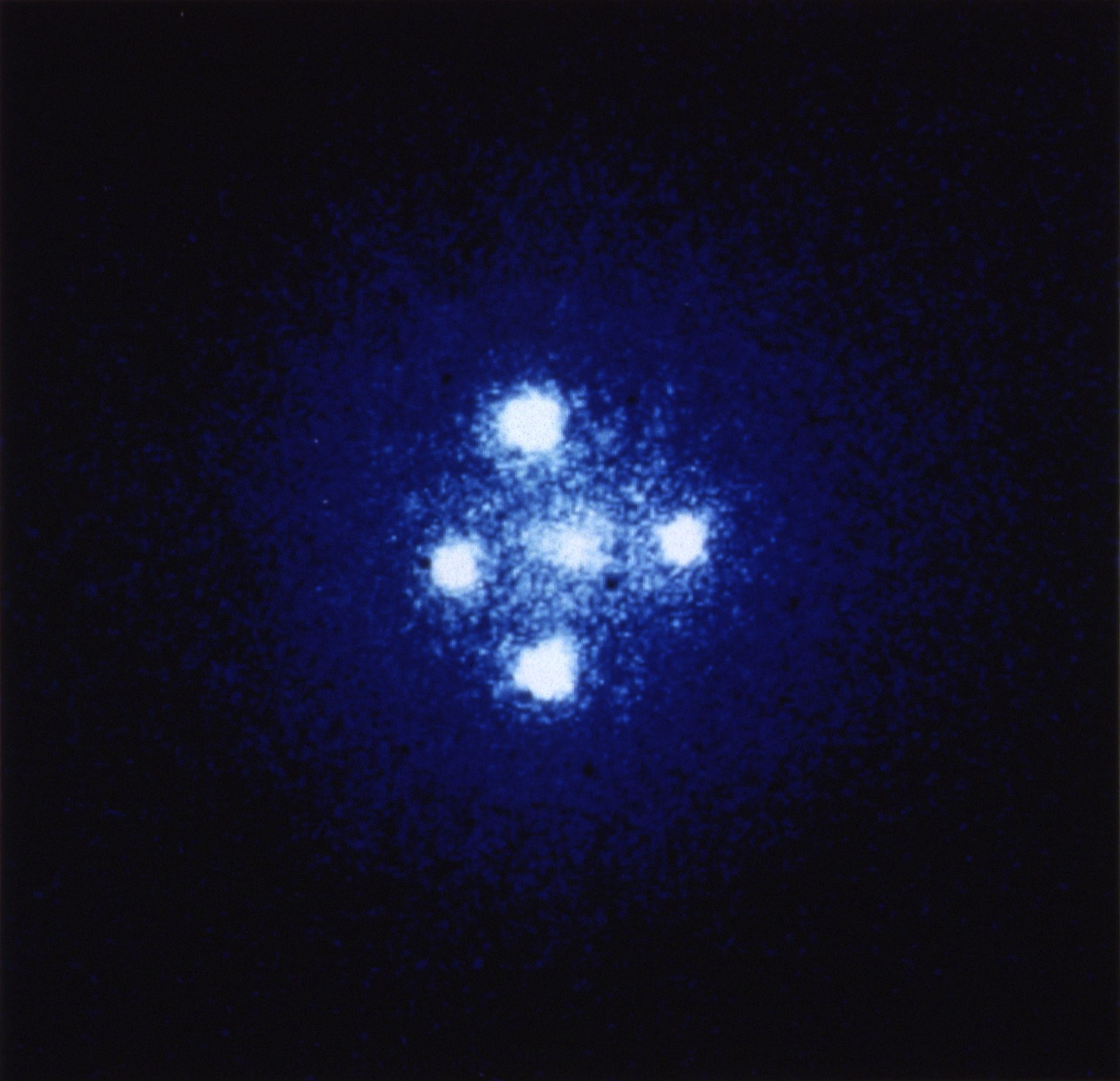

Observation data (Epoch J2000)
- Constellation: Pegasus
- Right ascension: 22^{h} 40^{m} 30.3^{s}
- Declination: +3° 21′ 31″
- Redshift: 1.695
- Distance: 8,000,000,000 ly (2,500,000,000 pc)
- Type: LeQ
- Apparent dimensions (V): less than 2"
- Apparent magnitude (V): 16.78

Other designations
- LEDA 69457, Z 378-15

The Einstein Cross (Q2237+0305 or QSO 2237+0305) is a gravitationally lensed quasar that sits directly behind the centre of the galaxy ZW 2237+030, called Huchra's Lens. Four images of the same distant quasar (plus one in the centre, too dim to see) appear in the middle of the foreground galaxy due to strong gravitational lensing. This system was discovered by John Huchra and coworkers in 1985, although at the time they only detected that there was a quasar behind a galaxy based on differing redshifts and did not resolve the four separate images of the quasar.

While gravitationally lensed light sources are often shaped into an Einstein ring, due to the elongated shape of the lensing galaxy and the quasar being off-centre, the images form a peculiar cross-shape instead.

Other "Einstein crosses" have been discovered.

== Details ==
The quasar's redshift indicates that it is located about 8 billion light years from Earth, while the lensing galaxy is at a distance of 400 million light years. The apparent dimensions of the entire foreground galaxy are 0.87 × 0.34 arcminutes, while the apparent dimension of the cross in its centre accounts for only 1.6 × 1.6 arcseconds.

The Einstein Cross can be found in Pegasus at 22^{h} 40^{m} 30.3^{s}, +3° 21′ 31″.

Amateur astronomers are able to see some of the cross using telescopes; however, it requires extremely dark skies and telescope mirrors with diameters of 18 inches (46 cm) or greater.

The individual images are labelled A through D (i.e. QSO 2237+0305 A), the lensing galaxy is sometimes referred to as QSO 2237+0305 G.

== Gallery ==
In addition to Q2237+0305, other lensed quasars may sometimes be described as an "Einstein cross".

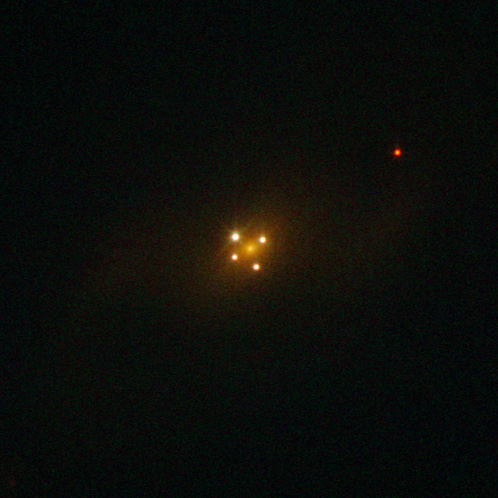
Hubble Space Telescope image of Q2237+0305, "the" Einstein Cross.

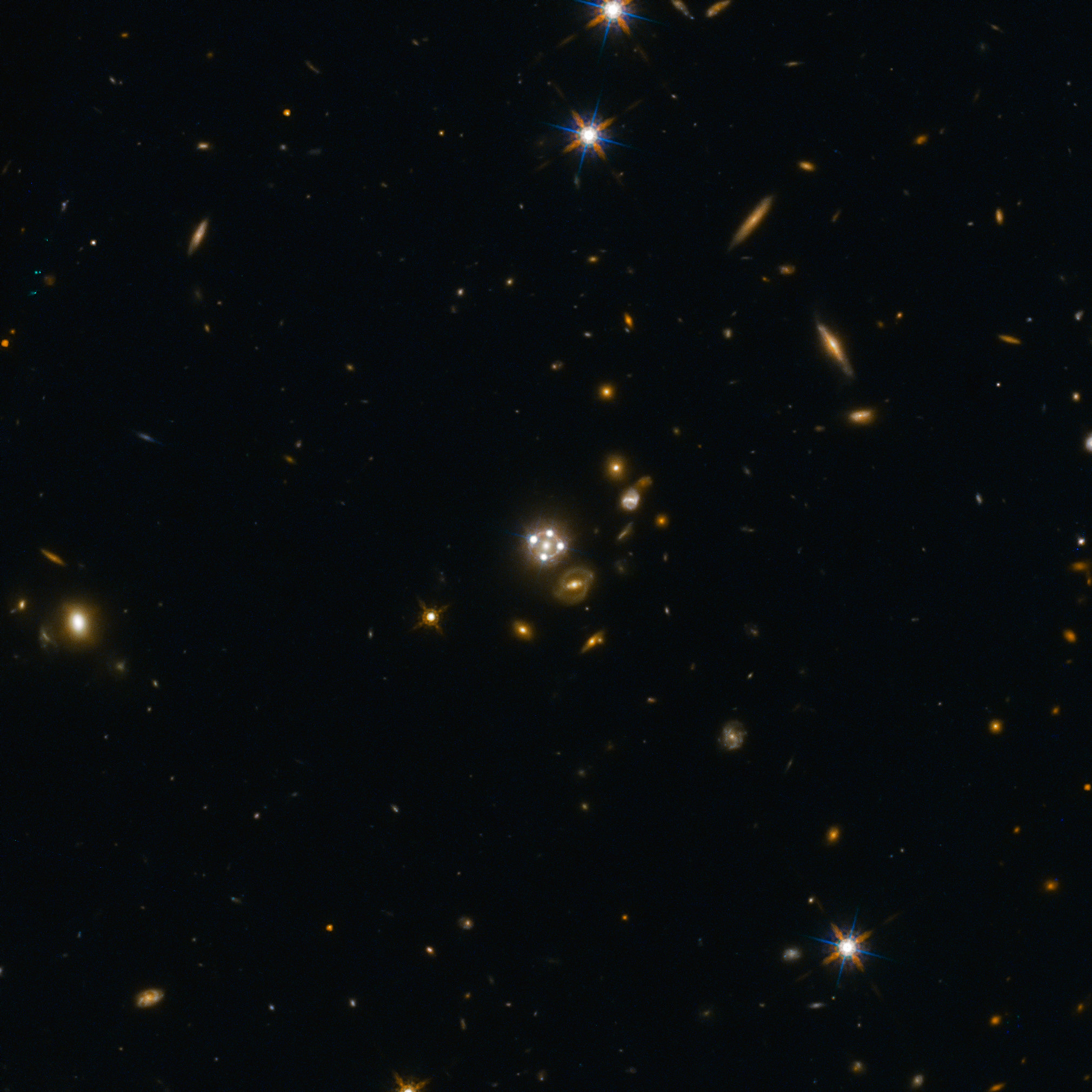
Another lensed quasar, HE 0435−1223 in Eridanus, and its surroundings

== See also ==
- Cloverleaf quasar
- SN Refsdal
- Twin Quasar
