= D. Harold McNamara =

American astronomer

Delbert Harold McNamara
- D. Harold McNamara
- Born: June 28, 1923; Salt Lake City, Utah, USA
- Died: January 9, 2014 (aged 90); Provo, Utah, USA
- Education: University of California, Berkeley
- Known for: Variable star research Member of Board of Directors of Astronomical Society of the Pacific (1968-1969); Editor of the Publications of the Astronomical Society of the Pacific (1968-2004)
- Awards: George van Biesbroeck Prize (2000); Astronomical Society of the Pacific Distinguished Service Award; Lick Observatory Fellow; Karl G. Maeser Research Award; Wesley P. Lloyd Memorial Award
- Scientific career
- Fields: Astronomy
- Military career
- Allegiance: United States
- Branch: United States Navy
- Service years: 1943–1946
- Rank: LTJG
- Conflicts: World War II: Pacific Theater

Notes
- Member of the American Astronomical Society, Astronomical Society of the Pacific, International Astronomical Union and Sigma Xi

Delbert Harold McNamara, Ph.D. (June 28, 1923 - January 9, 2014) was an American astronomer at Brigham Young University and an internationally recognized authority in intrinsic variable and eclipsing binary stars.

McNamara received his Ph.D. from the University of California at Berkeley in 1950. His dissertation was entitled "A Two Color Photometric Study of the Eclipsing Variable, YZ Cassiopeia". Following his Ph.D. he spent five years teaching and researching with the renown Professor Otto Struve. In 1955, he joined Brigham Young University as the first faculty member whose training was primarily in the field of astronomy. He then inaugurated the graduate program in astrophysics at BYU in 1957. He authored or co-authored more than 100 publications and has presented in different countries around the world.

McNamara was a recipient of the Lick Observatory Fellowship while a graduate student at Berkeley. He was a guest investigator at the McDonald Observatory in Texas, guest investigator at the Mount Wilson and Mount Palomar Observatories in California, guest investigator at the Cerro Tololo Inter-American Observatory in Chile and principal scientist at the Space Sciences Laboratory in California.

From 1968 to 1991, McNamara was editor of the Publications of the Astronomical Society of the Pacific. In 1987 he founded the Conference Series, which has grown to become one of the community's leading publishers of conference proceedings. McNamara was also a member of the Board of Directors of the Astronomical Society of the Pacific from 1968 to 1969.

In 2000 McNamara received the George Van Biesbroeck Prize by the American Astronomical Society for "long-term extraordinary or unselfish service to astronomy". He was honored in 2010 with the Distinguished Service Award by the Utah Academy of Sciences, Arts & Letters. Other rewards and recognition include the Karl G. Maeser Research Award in 1966, the Fourth Distinguished Annual Faculty Lecture from Brigham Young University in 1967 and the Wesley P. Lloyd Memorial Award in 1982-83.

McNamara served in the United States Navy during World War II (1943–1946) and retired as a Lieutenant JG.

McNamara was a member of the American Astronomical Society, Astronomical Society of the Pacific, the International Astronomical Union and Sigma Xi.
