= John Huchra =

American astronomer and professor (1948–2010)

John Peter Huchra (/ˈhʌkrə/ HUK-rə; December 23, 1948 – October 8, 2010) was an American astronomer and professor. He was the Vice Provost for Research Policy at Harvard University and a professor of Astronomy at the Center for Astrophysics | Harvard & Smithsonian. He was also a former chair of the United States National Committee for the International Astronomical Union. and past president of the American Astronomical Society.

Huchra was born on December 23, 1948, in Jersey City, New Jersey, to a father who was a train conductor and a mother who was a housewife. He was raised in Ridgefield Park, New Jersey and graduated from Ridgefield Park High School as part of the class of 1966. He developed an interest in reading books about cosmology and science fiction. He was a member of the wrestling team at the Massachusetts Institute of Technology, where he earned his undergraduate degree in 1970 with a major in physics. He went on to the California Institute of Technology, where he was awarded a Ph.D. in astronomy. He took on a postdoctoral fellowship at the Center for Astrophysics | Harvard & Smithsonian in 1976 and remained there for the rest of his career.

Together with fellow astronomers Marc Aaronson and Jeremy Mould, Huchra announced that based on their analysis of the brightness and rotational speed of certain spiral galaxies that the universe was nine billion years old, half the age that most astronomers had previously thought.

In 1986, Valérie de Lapparent, Margaret Geller and Huchra published the surprisingly non-uniform distribution of galaxies at scales of several tens of megaparsecs from early results of the CfA Redshift Survey. De Lapparent, Geller and Huchra described the galaxy distribution as apparently lying on the "surfaces of bubble-like structures". In 1989, using later results from their redshift survey, Geller and Huchra discovered the Great Wall, a structure measuring 600 million light years in length and 250 million light years in width. This is the second largest known super-structure in the universe.

The gravitational lensing galaxy in front of the so-called Einstein Cross quasar was discovered by Huchra and coworkers and has been called Huchra's Lens.
