= Heather A. Knutson =

Astrophysicist

Heather Knutson
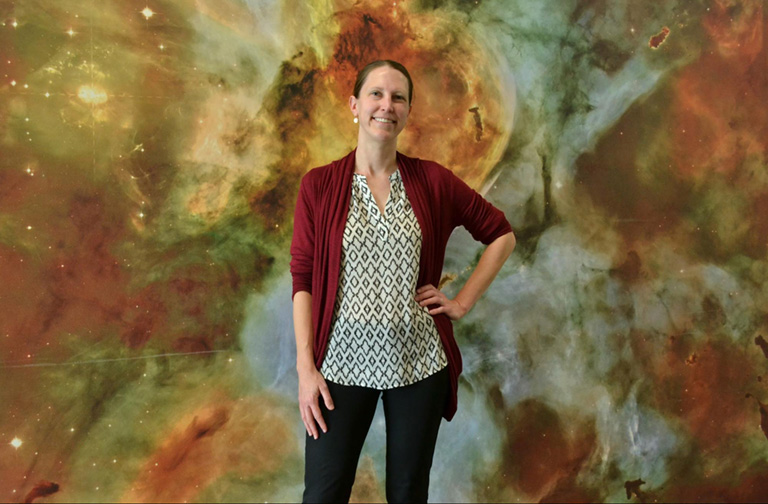
- Knutson in 2018, photo from the Jet Propulsion Laboratory.
- Education: Johns Hopkins University; Harvard University
- Awards: NSF GRFP Newton Lacy Pierce Prize in Astronomy; Annie Jump Cannon Award in Astronomy; NSF CAREER Award; Sloan Fellowship Presidential Early Career Award for Scientists and Engineers
- Scientific career
- Fields: Astrophysics; Exoplanets
- Workplaces: California Institute of Technology
- Thesis: Portraits of distant worlds: Characterizing the atmospheres of extrasolar planets (2009)
- Doctoral advisor: David Charbonneau

Heather A. Knutson is an astrophysicist and professor of planetary science at California Institute of Technology in the Division of Geological and Planetary Sciences. Her research is focused on the study of exoplanets, their composition and formation.

In 2016, she was referred to in Popular Science as "the first exoplanet meteorologist, determining the local temperature, weather, and even composition of the atmosphere".

== Education ==
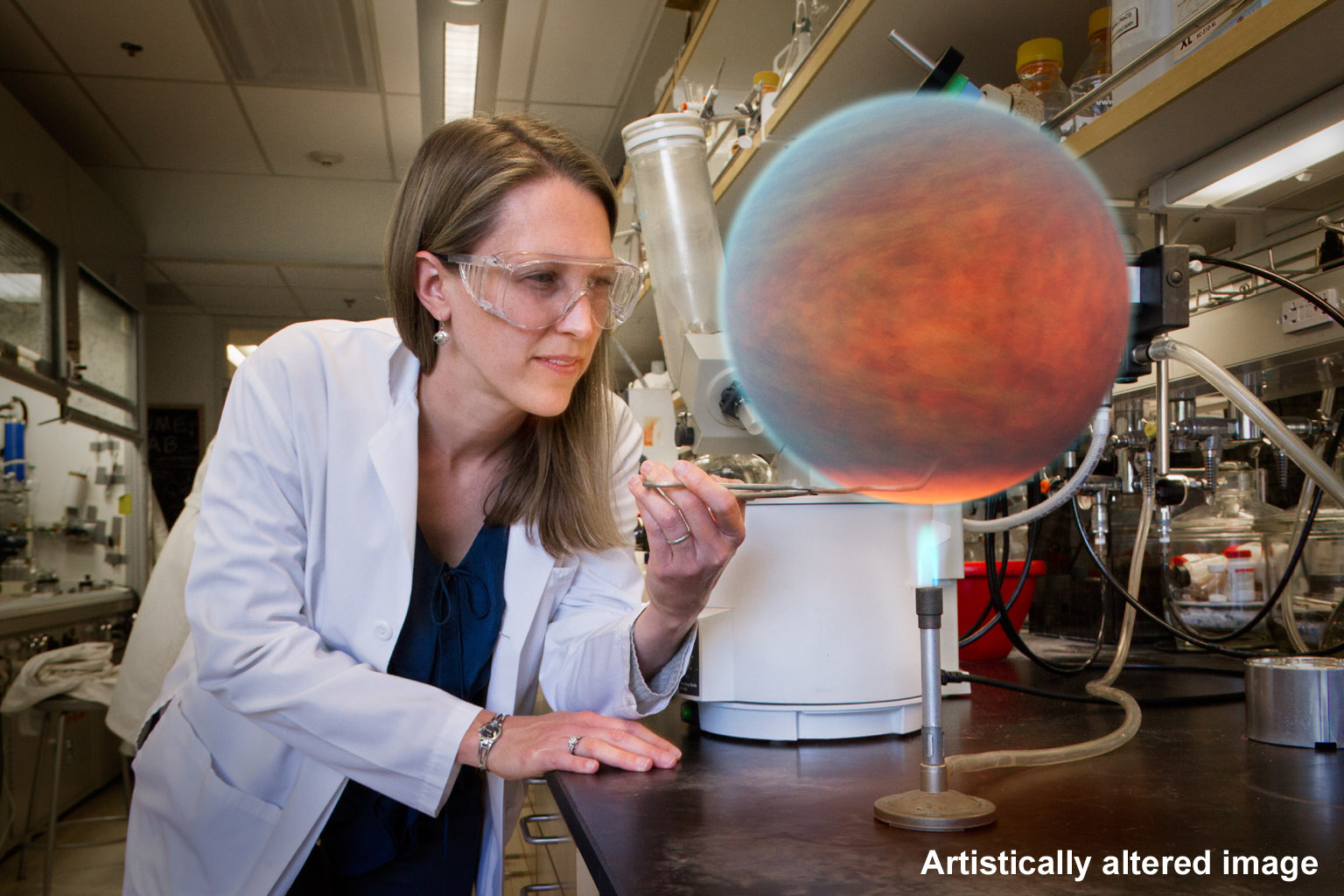
Knutson holds Jupiter over Bunsen burner; artistically altered image from the Jet Propulsion Laboratory.

As an undergraduate in the physics department of Johns Hopkins University, Knutson worked part-time as an intern with the Space Telescope Science Institute. In 2004, she graduated with a B.S. in physics with both departmental and university honors.

Following her undergraduate work, Knutson completed doctoral studies at Harvard University with doctoral advisor David Charbonneau. She completed her Ph.D. in astronomy there in 2009 upon successful defense of her thesis, entitled Portraits of distant worlds: Characterizing the atmospheres of extrasolar planets.

== Academic career ==
Following completion of her doctorate, Knutson worked for two years as a Miller Institute postdoctoral fellow in the department of astronomy at the University of California, Berkeley. There, she studied the atmospheres of so-called "hot Jupiters," exoplanet gas giants orbiting close to their star, by studying the light from those stars as they were partially eclipsed by their planets.

Since 2011, Knutson has been at the California Institute of Technology. Her work characterizing exoplanetary atmospheres has led to a number of awards and recognition, including the American Astronomical Society's Annie Jump Cannon Award in Astronomy in 2013 and Newton Lacy Pierce Prize in Astronomy in 2015. She was awarded a CAREER award by the National Science Foundation in 2016 for a proposal studying smaller exoplanets and upon recommendation by the same agency was awarded a Presidential Early Career Award for Scientists and Engineers in 2017.

== Awards and recognition ==
- Presidential Early Career Award for Scientists and Engineers, 2017
- National Science Foundation CAREER (Faculty Early Career Development) Award, 2016
- Newton Lacy Pierce Prize in Astronomy, American Astronomical Society, 2015
- Alfred P. Sloan Research Fellow in Physics, 2015
- Annie Jump Cannon Award in Astronomy, American Astronomical Society, 2013
- National Science Foundation Graduate Research Fellowship, 2004
