= Herricks High School =

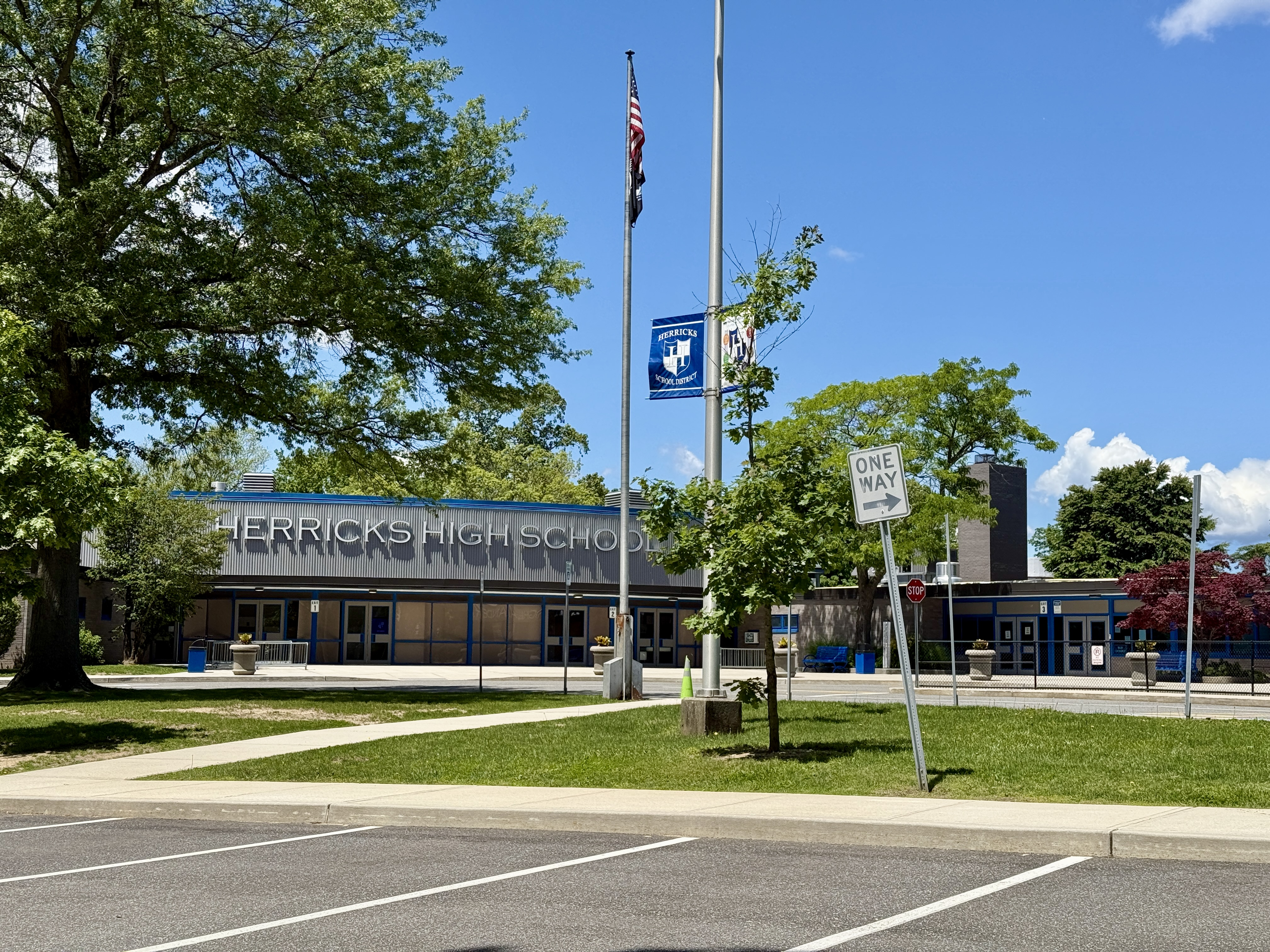
- The main entrance to Herricks High School in May 2025

Location
- 100 Shelter Rock Road; New Hyde Park, NY 11040; United States; 40°45′53″N 73°39′46″W

Information
- Type: Public
- Established: 1958
- School district: Herricks Union Free School District
- Superintendent: Tony Sinanis
- Principal: Joan Keegan
- Teaching staff: 123.02 FTEs
- Grades: 9-12
- Enrollment: 1,535 (as of 2024-2025)
- Student to teacher ratio: 12.48
- Colors: Royal blue and silver
- Mascot: The Highlander
- Website: High school website

Herricks High School is a comprehensive public high school, located in Searingtown, Nassau County, New York, United States. The sole high school within the Herricks Union Free School District, the school is accredited by the New York State Board of Regents and the Middle States Association, and it received the National Blue Ribbon school distinction in 2017.

The school is famous for its involvement in one of the major Supreme Court rulings affecting prayer in public schools, decided by the U.S. Supreme Court in 1962.

== History ==
Herricks High School stands on Watermelon Hill. It was designed by Valley Stream-based Frederic P. Wiedersum Associates. The land near the area was a burial ground for the Pearsall family starting in the 17th century, but the burial grounds were later removed.

The high school opened in September 1958 and had its first graduating class in 1960.

Known for the "Herricks Prayer Case, Engel v. Vitale," the Herricks School District (a.k.a. Union Free School District #9) was sued by five district property owners in 1959. "Almighty God, we acknowledge our dependence upon Thee, and we beg Thy blessings upon us, our parents, our teachers and our Country" was recited as a daily procedure on the recommendation of the NY State Board of Regents. This case was decided by the U. S. Supreme Court, which ruled the prayer unconstitutional in 1962.

In 2013, Herricks High School celebrated the Herricks School District's 200th anniversary.

In the late 2010s, the cafeterias received major renovations, creating a more inviting and open atmosphere.

== Demographics ==
As of the 2014–15 school year, the school had an enrollment of 1,373 students and 94.2 classroom teachers (on an FTE basis), for a student–teacher ratio of 14.6:1. There were 61 students (4.4% of enrollment) eligible for free lunch and 29 (2.1% of students) eligible for reduced-cost lunch.

== Music and theater ==
The music department is home to ten different performing ensembles, including several advanced groups: Jazz Band, Wind Ensemble, Chamber Orchestra, and Chamber Choir.

Herricks is also home to Chapter 1975 of the Tri-M Music Honor Society.

== Sports ==
Herricks High School offers the following sports: football, badminton, softball, baseball, tennis, soccer, wrestling, volleyball, lacrosse, basketball, bowling, swimming, track, winter track and field, golf, cross country, fencing, girls flag football and cheerleading.

== Television ==
Herricks High School has a television channel called HTN (Herricks Television Network) that goes with their TV Studio classes. The morning announcements air on HTN at around 9:30 AM Monday-Friday. HTN airs locally on Channel 47 on Verizon Fios, Channel 75 on Optimum, and Channel 65 on Antenna TV.

== Publications ==
Publications include the Highlander newspaper and the OPUS literary magazine.

== Notable alumni ==
- Ray Dalio, hedge fund manager
- Cliff Asness, hedge fund manager
- Krishna Das, musician
- Nadine Faustin-Parker, three-time Olympian for the Republic of Haiti (2000, 2004, 2008)
- Alyssa A. Goodman, Class of 1980, Professor of Astronomy at Harvard University
- Alex Katz (baseball), baseball player in the Baltimore Orioles organization
- Liam McHugh, sports journalist
- Eric J. Nestler, Chair of Neuroscience at Icahn School of Medicine at Mount Sinai
- David Quinn, actor and co-founder of Allrecipes.com
- Joe Roth - film executive, producer and film director
- Matthew Senreich, screenwriter, producer & director
- Robert Sitkoff, Professor at Harvard Law School
- Jai Wolf (Sajeeb Saha), electronic music producer
- Richard Zimler, novelist
