= Rodger Doxsey =

American physicist and astronomer

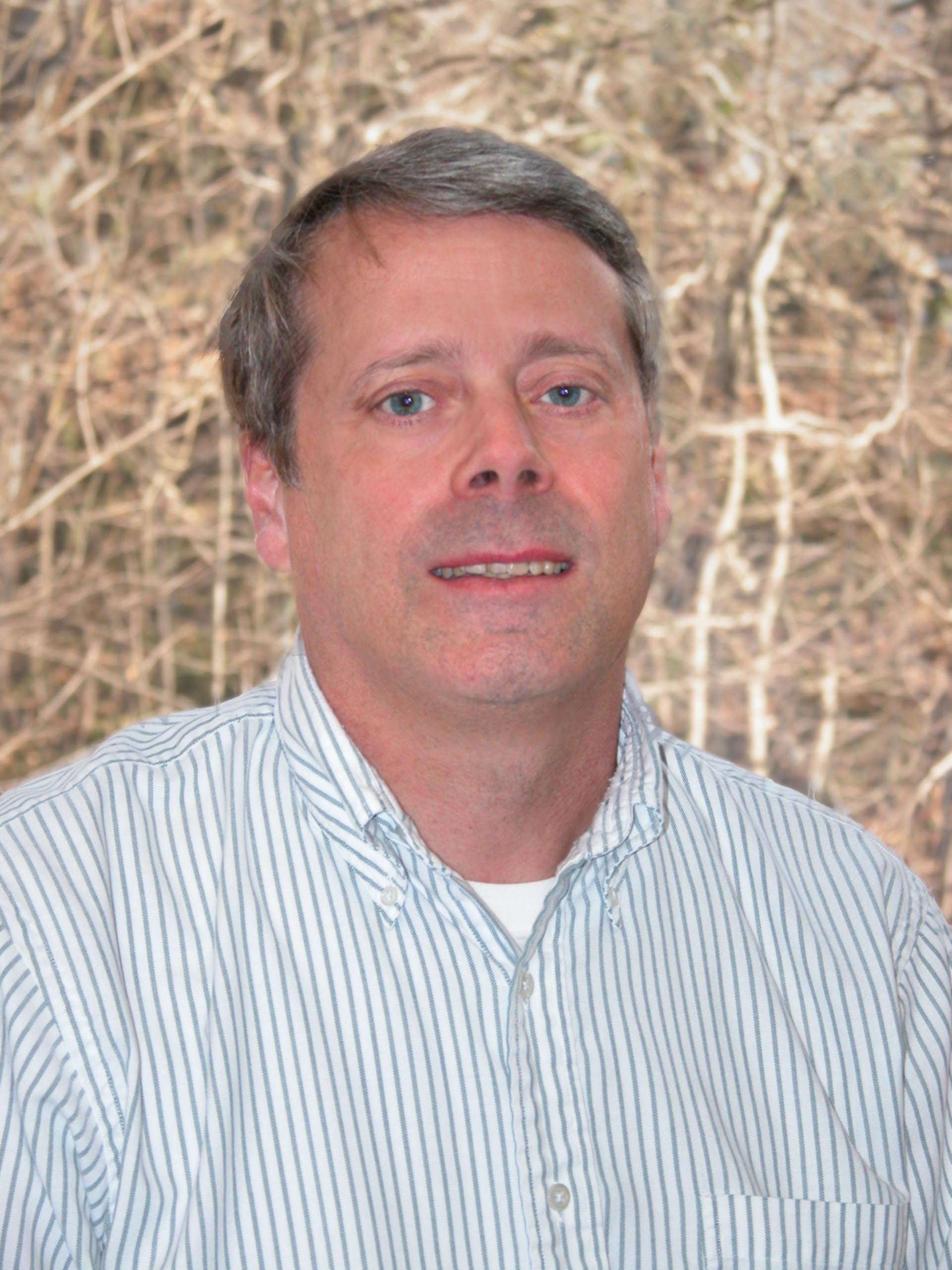
- Dr. Rodger Doxsey in 2004
- Born: March 11, 1947; Schenectady, New York, United States
- Died: October 13, 2009 (aged 62); Towson, Maryland, US
- Education: Massachusetts Institute of Technology
- Known for: Hubble Space Telescope
- Awards: NASA Distinguished Public Service Medal (1991); George Van Biesbroeck Prize (2004)
- Scientific career
- Fields: X-ray astronomy
- Workplaces: Space Telescope Science Institute

Rodger Evans Doxsey (March 11, 1947 – October 13, 2009) was an American physicist and astronomer who made major contributions to the scientific and operational success of NASA's (National Aeronautics and Space Administration) Hubble Space Telescope (HST). He joined the HST Project at the Space Telescope Science Institute (STScI), in Baltimore, Maryland, in 1981, and was head of the Hubble Missions Office when he died in 2009.

Of Doxsey, STScI Director Matt Mountain said, "Rodger was the heart and soul of Hubble here at the Institute. He knew everything about the space telescope, from the smallest anomaly to the breadth of the extraordinary science delivered by the telescope he had worked with for over 28 years."

== Career at MIT ==
Dr. Doxsey was born in Schenectady, New York, raised in Cleveland Heights, Ohio and earned his Ph.D. in physics at the Massachusetts Institute of Technology. After his doctorate, he worked at MIT on the third NASA Small Astronomy Satellite (SAS 3), an X-ray astronomy mission, and then on the first High Energy Astronomy Observatory (HEAO 1), which was launched in August 1977.

== Work at STScI ==
The institute's first director, Riccardo Giacconi, hired Doxsey nine years before the HST launch in 1990, to be the mission operations scientist. During the following years he was responsible for mission science specifications and requirements, data calibration, operational planning and scheduling, as well as the actual day-to-day commanding of the observatory. Doxsey worked on the development of new, state-of-the-art instruments for HST with NASA's Goddard Space Flight Center, which contributed to the enormous advance made in Hubble's scientific capabilities after launch, by replacing, in the course of several Space Shuttle visits from 1993 to May 2009, the original suite of instruments which had been specified and designed on the basis of technology that was many years old by the time HST finally became operational. Doxsey was also responsible for hiring many of the STScI's staff.

== Awards and honors ==
Among Doxsey's many awards and honors, especially notable are:

- 1991: Awarded the NASA Distinguished Public Service Medal, the highest honor the Agency can give a nongovernmental employee. The citation noted his "exceptional accomplishments and contributions to the Hubble Space Telescope", and implementation of the systems needed to accomplish those ends.
- 2004: Awarded the American Astronomical Society's George Van Biesbroeck Prize, citing Dr. Doxsey's "outstanding, unselfish dedication" to making Hubble "one of the most scientifically productive telescopes of all time."

In Honor of Doxsey, the American Astronomical Society has a Rodger Doxsey Travel Prize awarded to graduate or PhD students.
