= CfA Redshift Survey =

Map survey of the universe

The Center for Astrophysics Redshift Survey
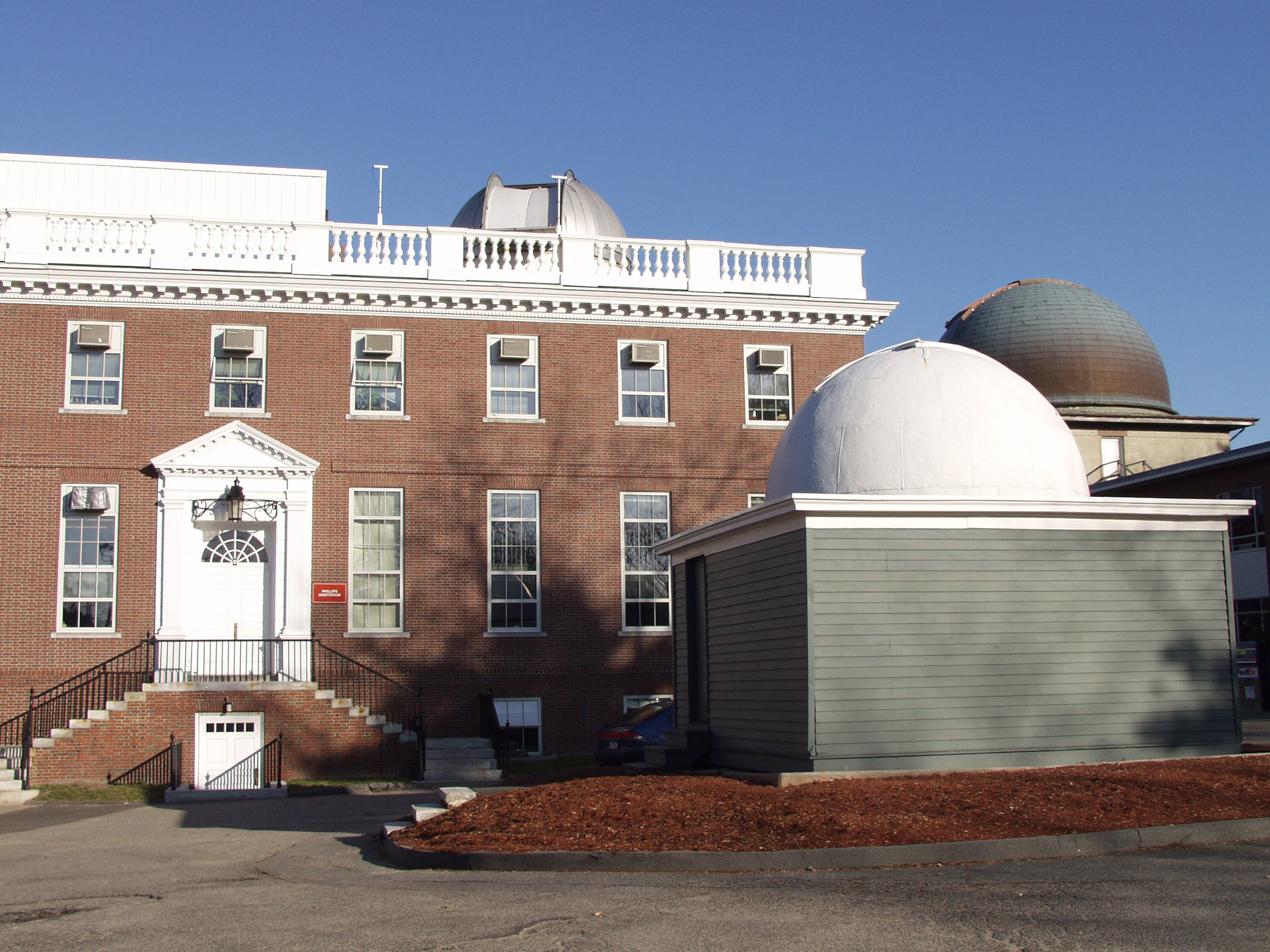
- Smithsonian Astrophysical Observatory
- Alternative names: CfA Redshift Survey

The Center for Astrophysics (CfA) Redshift Survey was the first attempt to map the large-scale structure of the universe.

The first survey began in 1977 with the objective of calculating the velocities of the brighter galaxies in the nearby universe by measuring their redshifts at the Smithsonian Astrophysical Observatory in Cambridge, Massachusetts. The redshift is the relative increase in the wavelength emitted by a light source, in this case a galaxy, moving away from an observer from which its speed and then, using Hubble's law, its distance can be calculated. A 3-dimensional map of that part of the Universe could thus be produced. This initial data collection was completed by 1982.

The second survey (CfA2) was started in 1985 by John Huchra and Margaret Geller and measured the redshifts of 18,000 bright galaxies in the Northern sky by 1995. Data from the second CfA survey showed that galaxies were not evenly distributed but clustered on the spherical surfaces of empty "voids". The project also made the 1989 discovery of the Great Wall, a supercluster of galaxies surrounded by voids that surprised astronomers because its size was larger than could be produced by gravitational collapse since the beginning of the universe. Since then, superclusters have been described as artifacts of quantum fluctuations in the inflationary epoch of the universe.
