= Kirpal Nandra =

British physicist

- Born: 11 September 1911; North Shields, England
- Education: Churchill College, Cambridge; University of Leicester

Kirpal "Paul" Nandra (born 1966) is a British physicist and the current director at the Max Planck Institute for Extraterrestrial Physics.

He was Professor of Astrophysics and Head of the Astrophysics Group at Imperial College London.

He is noted as a member of the X-ray group and studies the astrophysics of extreme environments, specifically those close to black holes in active galactic nuclei. He has written or co-written numerous papers on this topic.

== Early life ==
Nandra was born in North Shields in the northeast of England. His parents were biochemists. Nandra graduated from Churchill College, Cambridge and completed a PhD at the University of Leicester.

== Awards ==
- 2000 Newton Lacy Pierce Prize in Astronomy for his work.
