= Erik Quistgaard =

General director of the European Space Agencie

- Born: 3 June 1921; Copenhagen, Denmark
- Died: 11 February 2013 (aged 91); Valbonne, France
- Known for: Director General of European Space Agency
- Scientific career
- Fields: Aerospace Engineering
- Workplaces: European Space Agency; European Space Research Organisation

Erik Quistgaard (3 June 1921 – 11 February 2013) was a Danish engineer and Director General of the European Space Agency (ESA) from 1980 until 1984.

As head of ESA, he oversaw early stages of the Ariane launcher's development, as well as Spacelab's earliest contributions to space science, notably its maiden launching, with the first ESA astronaut in space.

With an MS (1945) in Mechanical Engineering from the Technical University of Denmark, Quistgaard's early career included working in the US as an engineer for Chrysler 1948-1951, and at Volvo in Sweden, where he held various production management functions between 1956 and 1972. Prior to joining ESA, Erik Quistgaard headed the Danish naval and maritime yard Odense Steel Shipyard from 1972 to 1979. A European recipient (1984) of the NASA Distinguished Public Service Medal, Erik Quistgaard was also among the founders of the SES (Astra satellite) company in Luxembourg.
