= Harriet Dinerstein =

American astronomer

Harriet Dinerstein is an American astronomer. The American Astronomical Society honored her work by awarding her the Annie J. Cannon Prize in 1985. She also received the Newton Lacy Pierce Prize in 1989. Dinerstein received her Bachelor of Science degree from Yale University in 1975 and her Ph.D. from the University of California, Santa Cruz in 1980. She currently is a Professor of Astronomy at the University of Texas at Austin.

Her special areas of study include chemical abundances of stars, planetary nebulae, and H II regions (interstellar gas containing ionized hydrogen). She also discovered in 1973 on photographic plates the recurrent nova V3890 Sagittarii, which erupted in May or June 1962, April 1990, and on 27 August 2019.

== Awards ==
In 1989 she won the Newton Lacy Pierce Prize in Astronomy from the American Astronomical Society. In 1984 she won the Annie J. Cannon Award in Astronomy from the American Association of University Women/American Astronomical Society.
