= Alyssa A. Goodman =

American astronomer (born 1962)

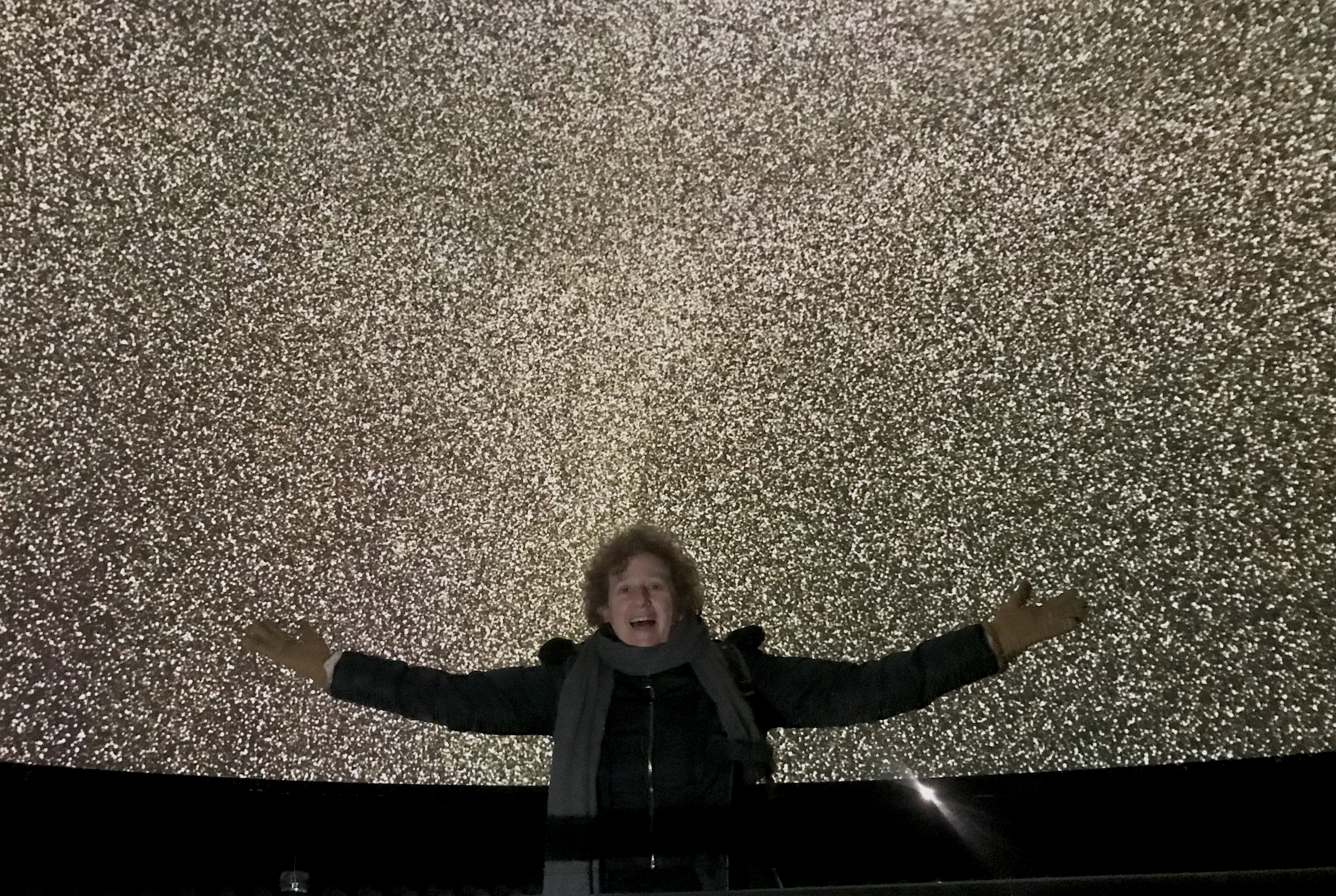
- Goodman at New York's Hayden Planetarium, December 2019
- Born: Alyssa Ann Goodman; July 1, 1962 (age 64); New York, New York, U.S.
- Education: Massachusetts Institute of Technology; Harvard University
- Awards: Newton Lacy Pierce Prize, Harvard Foundation Scientist of the Year, 2015
- Scientific career
- Fields: Astronomy
- Thesis: Interstellar Magnetic Fields: An Observational Perspective (1989)
- Doctoral advisor: Irwin I. Shapiro
- Other academic advisors: Charles R. Alcock
- Website: www.cfa.harvard.edu/~agoodman/newweb/index.html

Alyssa Ann Goodman (born July 1, 1962) is the Robert Wheeler Willson Professor of Applied Astronomy at Harvard University, former co-director for Science at the Radcliffe Institute for Advanced Study, Research Associate of the Smithsonian Institution, and the founding director of the Harvard Initiative in Innovative Computing.

== Education ==
A native of New York, Goodman attended Herricks High School in New Hyde Park, New York. She later received her B.S. in Physics from the Massachusetts Institute of Technology in 1984. She then continued her education at Harvard University receiving a Ph.D in Physics in 1989.

== Career ==
Goodman's research is conducted at the Center for Astrophysics | Harvard & Smithsonian in Cambridge, Massachusetts, where she studies the dense gas between stars. In particular, her research interest is on how interstellar gas arranges itself into new stars.

Goodman is also a principal investigator of the COMPLETE Survey of Star-Forming Regions, which maps out three large star-forming regions in the galaxy in their entirety. Goodman's personal research presently focuses primarily on new ways to visualize and analyze the tremendous data volumes created by large and/or diverse astronomical surveys. She has worked closely with Curtis Wong and Jonathan Fay on the Microsoft WorldWide Telescope project at Microsoft Research and the American Astronomical Society to create, open-source, and enhance the use of the WorldWide Telescope, a computer program offering a virtual online universe to researchers and educators. Goodman was named “Scientist of the Year” by the Harvard Foundation in 2015.

She has served on several data-related institutional and government advisory committees, including the National Academy's Board on Research Data and Information, and the NSF-sponsored Council on Big Data, Ethics, and Society. From 2008 to 2009, Goodman was a "Scholar-in-Residence" at WGBH, while on sabbatical.

She founded PredictionX, a modular learning program at Harvard that traces humanity's effort to understand the future.

She also appeared in a 'Fetch! with Ruff Ruffman episode in season 4.

== Honors ==
- Elected a Legacy Fellow of the American Astronomical Society (2020)
- Harvard Foundation's 2015 Scientist of the Year
- Bok Prize, Harvard (1998)
- Newton Lacy Pierce Prize in Astronomy from the American Astronomical Society (1997)
