= George Van Biesbroeck Prize =

Award for astronomy

The George Van Biesbroeck Prize is an award for long-term achievements in the field of astronomy. According to the American Astronomical Society awards website; "The Van Biesbroeck prize is normally awarded every two years and honors a living individual for long-term extraordinary or unselfish service to astronomy, often beyond the requirements of his or her paid position."

From 1979 to 1996 the award was presented by Van Biesbroeck Award, Inc. The American Astronomical Society assumed responsibility for the Prize in 1997.

The prize is named after George Van Biesbroeck who himself continued to work as an active astronomer for 27 years after "retirement" at age 65.

Winners of the award have been:

== Awarded by Van Biesbroeck Award, Inc. ==
- 1979 D. Scott Davis
- 1980 Marcia J. Rieke
- 1981 Marc Aaronson, Jeremy R. Mould
- 1982 Erick T. Young
- 1983 No Award
- 1984 John T. Stocke
- 1985 Mark S Giampapa
- 1986 John M. Hill
- 1987 No Award
- 1988 E. Dorrit Hoffleit
- 1989 Brian G. Marsden
- 1990 Aden B. Meinel
- 1991 Barry Clark
- 1992 Bob Kurucz
- 1993 Janet Akyüz Mattei
- 1994 Wayne Warren, Jr.
- 1995 Arlo U. Landolt
- 1996 David L. Crawford

== Awarded by American Astronomical Society ==
- 1997 Helmut Abt
- 1998 Frank Lovas
- 1999 Barry Lasker
- 2000 D. Harold McNamara
- 2001 Michael J. Kurtz
- 2002 Victor Blanco
- 2003 Donat Wentzel
- 2004 Rodger Doxsey
- 2005 Eric Greisen
- 2006 No award
- 2007 Stephen P. Maran
- 2008 Peter Stetson
- 2009 Father George V. Coyne
- 2010 Virginia Trimble
- 2011 David S. Leckrone
- 2012 C. Megan Urry
- 2014 Michael Hauser
- 2016 Richard (Rick) A. Perley
- 2018 Debra Meloy Elmegreen
- 2020 Roc Cutri
- 2022 Donald York
- 2024 Frederick Seward
- 2026 Peter G. Martin

== See also ==
- List of astronomy awards
