= Jeyhan Kartaltepe =

American astronomer and academic

Jeyhan Sevim Kartaltepe
- Education: Colgate University; University of Hawaiʻi at Mānoa
- Scientific career
- Workplaces: National Optical Astronomy Observatory; Rochester Institute of Technology
- Thesis: A multiwavelength study of (ultra)luminous infrared galaxies in the cosmos field (2009)

Jeyhan Sevim Kartaltepe is an American astronomer, Associate Professor and Director of the Rochester Institute of Technology Laboratory for Multiwavelength Astrophysics. Her research considers observational astronomy and galaxy evolution. She is a lead investigator on the Cosmic Evolution Early Release Science Survey and the COSMOS-Webb Survey conducted on the James Webb Space Telescope.

== Early life and education ==
Kartaltepe is from San Antonio. She studied physics at Colgate University, where she majored in astronomy and spent her free time using the 16-inch telescope on campus. She moved to the University of Hawaiʻi at Mānoa for her graduate studies. She completed a master's degree in 2005, and embarked on a doctorate researching galaxies in the cosmos field. After earning her doctorate Kartaltepe was appointed a postdoctoral researcher at National Optical Astronomy Observatory, where she worked for two years before being made a Hubble Fellow. At the NOAO Kartaltepe investigated the interconnecting roles galaxy mergers and active galactic nuclei play amongst ultraluminous infrared galaxies.

== Research and career ==
In 2015 Kartaltepe joined the Rochester Institute of Technology, where she is Director of the Laboratory for Multiwavelength Astrophysics. She was a founder of the Cosmic Assembly Near-infrared Deep Extragalactic Legacy Survey (CANDELS) collaboration.

She is part of leadership of the Cosmic Evolution Early Release Science Survey. CEERS is one of the first collaborations to conduct observations using the James Webb Space Telescope, and looks to better understand the abundance of galaxies with photometric redshifts between 3 and 9, as they were 11 – 13 billion years ago. Her other JWST project, COSMOS-Webb, surveyed a large patch of sky with a Near Infrared Camera. It combined these data with mid-infrared images captured simultaneously. COSMOS-Webb looks to probe the first moments in which massive galaxies formed, and, using weak lensing, looked to map the dark matter distribution at early stages. It will help to identify the first fully evolved galaxies, which had stopped being active in the first two billion years after the Big Bang. COSMOS-Webb received the largest number of observation hours on JWST and covers the most area of any JWST survey to date. Kartaltepe's first observations from COSMOS-Webb identified considerably more early galaxies than expected, indicating that the universe expanded faster than expected.

Alongside her research, Kartaltepe is committed to science communication and outreach. She delivered a talk on the design of the James Webb Space Telescope at the 2022 Falling Walls.

== Select publications ==
- Norman A. Grogin; Dale D. Kocevski; S. M. Faber; et al. (1 December 2011). "CANDELS: The Cosmic Assembly Near-infrared Deep Extragalactic Legacy Survey". The Astrophysical Journal Supplement Series. 197 (2): 35. arXiv:1105.3753. Bibcode:2011ApJS..197...35G. doi:10.1088/0067-0049/197/2/35. ISSN 0067-0049. Wikidata Q58474370.
- Jeyhan S. Kartaltepe; Mark Dickinson; David M. Alexander; et al. (31 August 2012). "GOODS-Herschel and CANDELS: the morphologies of ultraluminous infrared galaxies at z ~ 2". The Astrophysical Journal. 757 (1): 23. arXiv:1110.4057. Bibcode:2012ApJ...757...23K. doi:10.1088/0004-637x/757/1/23. ISSN 0004-637X. Wikidata Q57710886.
- O. Ilbert; P. Capak; M. Salvato; et al. (8 December 2008). "COSMOS photometric redshifts with 30-Bands for 2-deg^2^". The Astrophysical Journal. 690 (2): 1236–1249, 1236-1249. arXiv:0809.2101. Bibcode:2009ApJ...690.1236I. doi:10.1088/0004-637x/690/2/1236. ISSN 0004-637X. Wikidata Q58035691.
