= Jim Banke =

American journalist

- Born: November 22, 1961 (age 64); Minnesota
- Occupation: aerospace journalist

Jim Banke is a former aerospace journalist and current owner of MILA Solutions LLC, a media consulting company.

== Career ==
Banke has written for Florida Today, Space.com and served as director of communications for the Space Foundation and worked as a Space Launch Development Analyst for SAIC. He was appointed to the Florida Governor’s Commission on the Future of Aeronautics and Space in 2006 leading to the creation of Space Florida. In 2007, Banke was awarded the NASA Distinguished Public Service Medal for his contributions to the aerospace industry in Florida. Banke also serves on the board of directors of the Air Force Space & Missile Museum Foundation and the National Space Club Florida Committee.

From 2009 to 2013, Banke hosted Space Talk a weekly radio program on WMMB in Melbourne, Florida discussing the nation's space program. He continues to provide live commentary for WMMB of rocket launches from Cape Canaveral Air Force Station and Kennedy Space Center in Florida.

In 2014, Banke was inducted into the Burnsville High School Hall of Fame.

In 2019, Banke's name was added to the exclusive list of "The Chroniclers" at the Kennedy Space Center press site in Florida. The Chroniclers honors exemplary journalists as well as government and industry communicators who worked at KSC to tell the NASA story.
