= University of Hawaiʻi Institute for Astronomy =

US astronomical research unit

Coordinates: 21°18′27″N 157°48′41″W

The University of Hawaiʻi Institute for Astronomy (UHIfA or IfA) is a research institute for astronomy at the University of Hawaiʻi at Mānoa, a public research university in Honolulu, Hawaii.

The institute's main headquarters are located at 2680 Woodlawn Drive in Honolulu, Hawaii. Additional facilities are located at Pukalani, Maui and Hilo on Hawaiʻi island (the Big Island). IfA employs over 150 astronomers and support staff. IfA astronomers perform research into Solar System objects, stars, galaxies and cosmology.

The Institute for Astronomy was founded in 1967 to conduct research and to manage the observatory complexes at Haleakalā, Maui and the Mauna Kea Observatory on the summit of Mauna Kea. It has approximately 55 faculty and employs over 300 people.

== See also ==
- Asteroid Terrestrial-impact Last Alert System (ATLAS)
- B612 Foundation
