= Wickelgren =

Wickelgren is a surname. Notable people with the surname include:

- Abraham Wickelgren (born 1969), American lawyer
- Kirsten Wickelgren, American mathmematician
