= Reflected entropy =

Quantum information quantity

Reflected entropy is a quantity in quantum information theory that measures correlations in a bipartite quantum-mechanical system described by a mixed state. It is defined by constructing a canonical purification of the density matrix in an enlarged Hilbert space and computing the entanglement entropy between the two subsystems in this purified state. Reflected entropy provides a way to characterize both classical and quantum correlations and is closely related to other information-theoretic quantities such as Mutual information.

In the context of the holographic AdS/CFT correspondence, reflected entropy for a pair of spatial regions in a conformal field theory (CFT) is conjectured to be related to a geometric quantity in the dual anti-de Sitter (AdS) spacetime. Specifically, it has been proposed that the reflected entropy is proportional to the area of a minimal surface associated with the two regions in the bulk spacetime, extending the ideas of the Ryu-Takayanagi formula to mixed states. This relation, sometimes referred to as the Dutta-Faulkner formula, provides a connection between quantum information measures in the CFT and geometric structures in the dual gravitational description.

== Conjecture ==
Consider a bipartite system consisting of two disjoint boundary regions $A$ and $B$ in a CFT. In the holographic setting, the union $A\cup B$ is associated with an entanglement wedge in the dual spacetime. Within this region $\mathcal{W}_{A\cup B}$, the entanglement wedge cross-section $E_\mathcal{W}$ is defined as the minimal-area codimension-2 surface that splits $\mathcal{W}_{A\cup B}$. The surface $E_\mathcal{W}$ satisfies several important properties:

1. $E_\mathcal{W}$ lies entirely within $\mathcal{W}_{A\cup B}$
2. Its area is non-decreasing under the inclusion of additional boundary regions: $E_{\mathcal{W}'} > E_\mathcal{W} \text{ if } \mathcal{W}' \supset \mathcal W$
3. $E_\mathcal{W}$ reduces to the minimal Ryu–Takayanagi surface for either $A$ or $B$ when $A\cup B$ is a pure quantum state.

The reflected entropy $S_R(A:B)$ is given by

$\frac{1}{2}S_R(A:B) = \frac{\text{Area}(E_\mathcal{W})}{4G_N}$,

where $G_N$ is Newton's gravitational constant. The reflected entropy was proposed by Souvik Dutta and Thomas Faulkner in 2019, and generalizes the Ryu–Takayanagi prescription to mixed states, providing an alternative to the entanglement of purification proposal of Takayanagi and Umemoto.

== Example ==
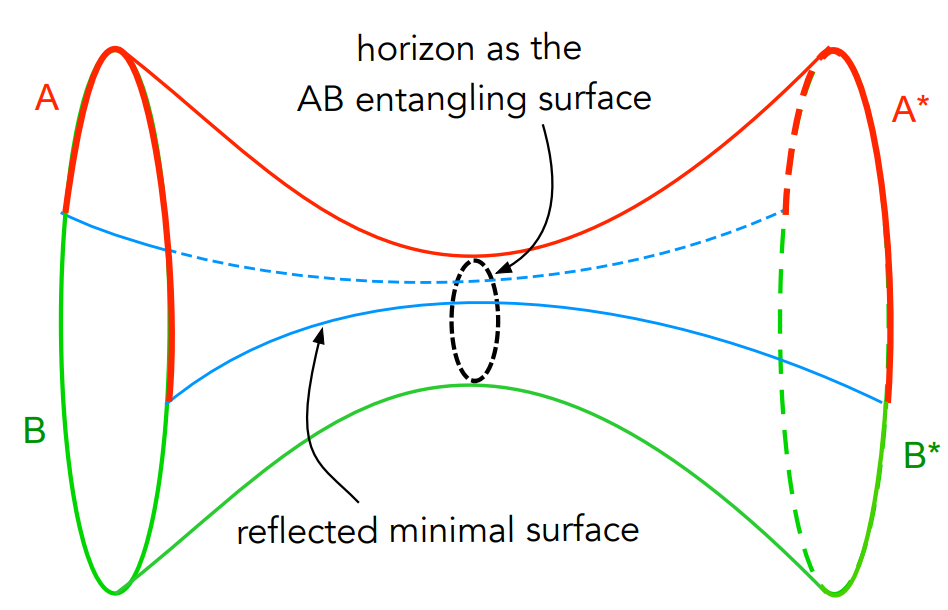
Reflected entangling surface for a two-sided Schwarzschild black hole

A simple illustration of the conjecture arises in the holographic dual of a two-sided eternal black hole, described by the thermofield double (TFD) state in a CFT. The left and right CFTs are individually in a Gibbs state, while the combined system is in a pure entangled state. The dual spacetime is the two-sided Schwarzschild black hole geometry, which encodes the correlations between the two CFTs.

Consider a bipartition $A:B$ of the left CFT. The Ryu-Takayanagi surface for $A\cup B$ in the bulk spacetime is the black hole horizon, to which the entanglement wedge $\mathcal{W}_{AB}$ extends. As the right CFT (on $A^\star\cup B^\star$) is the canonical purification of the left CFT,

$S_R(A:B) = S_{\text{TFD}}(AA^\star)$.

The Ryu-Takayanagi minimal surface $A\cup A^\star$ is shown in blue, which is exactly double the minimal cross-section of $\mathcal{W}_{AB}$.

$S_\text{TFD}(AA^\star) = 2\text{Area}(E_W)$.

As the former can be obtained by reflecting $E_\mathcal{W}$ about the horizon, these surfaces are also called reflected minimal surfaces.
