= Wayne Wickelgren =

American lawyer

Wayne Allen Wickelgren

Personal details
- Born: June 4, 1938 Hammond, Indiana, U.S.
- Died: November 2, 2005 (aged 67) New York City, New York, U.S.
- Spouse: Barbara Gordon-Lickey (m. 1962–1972)
- Children: 5
- Education: Harvard University (BA); University of California, Berkeley (Ph.D.)

Wayne Allen Wickelgren was a professor of psychology at Columbia University.

== Early life ==
Wickelgren was born on June 4, 1938, to Herman and Alma Larson Wickelgren. He graduated from Hammond High School.

== Education ==
Wickelgren attended Harvard University, graduating summa cum laude with the Class of 1960. He studied social relations. He received a Ph.D. in psychology from the University of California, Berkeley in 1962.

== Career ==
In 1962, Wickelgren started as an assistant professor in the Psychology department at the Massachusetts Institute of Technology. While there, he rose to full Professor and researched problem-solving, learning, and language.

In 1969, he started as a professor of psychology at the University of Oregon where he worked until 1987. From 1987 until his death in 2005, he was an Adjunct Research Scientist at Columbia University.

Wickelgren's work was used by James McClelland and David Rumelhart to develop the Wickelphone which is a sequence of 3 letters or symbols used together in a word.

He was a member of the International Neural Network Society, the Society for Neuroscience, the Psychonomic Society, the Cognitive Science Society, and the Society for Mathematical Psychology.

== Books ==
- Math Coach: A Parent's Guide to Helping Children Succeed in Math (2001)
- How to Solve Mathematical Problems (1995)
- Cognitive Psychology (1979)
- Learning and Memory (1977)
- How to Solve Problems: Elements of a Theory of Problems and Problem Solving (1974)

== Personal life ==
In 1962, Wickelgren married Barbara Gordon-Lickey. They had 2 children: Ingrid Wickelgren (1967) and lawyer Abraham Wickelgren (1969). The couple divorced in 1972. With partner Norma Graham, he had 3 children: physicist Peter W. Graham (1980), mathematician Kirsten Wickelgren (1981), and Jeanette Wickelgren (1985). Wickelgren was survived by his partner Norma Graham.
