= Rana X. Adhikari =

American experimental physicist (born 1974)

Rana Adhikari
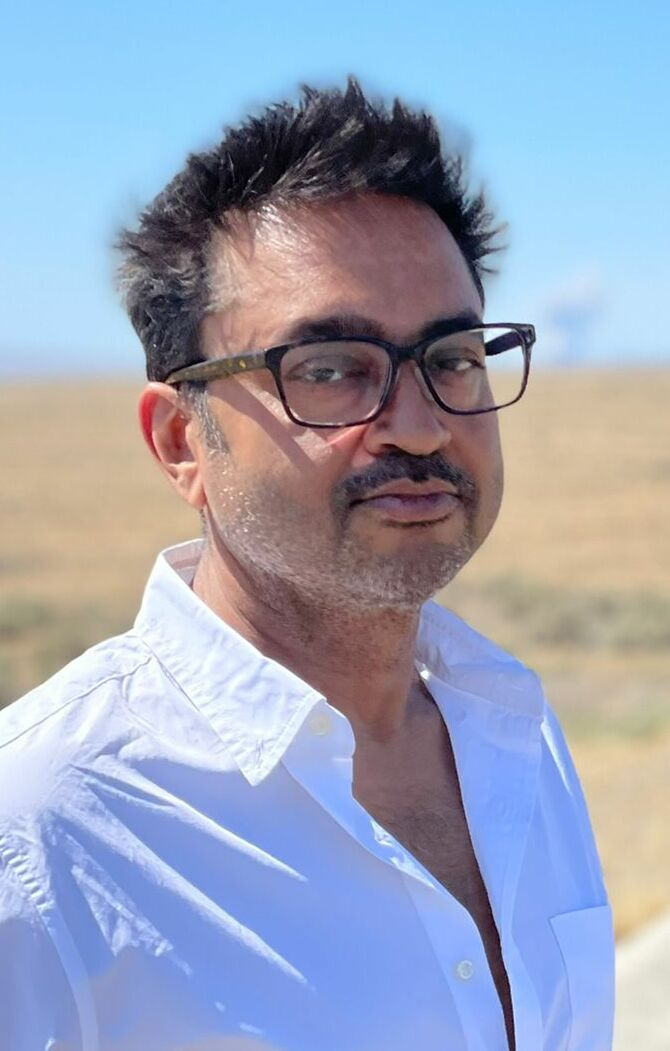
- Born: 1974 (age 51–52); Ohio, U.S.
- Education: University of Florida (BS); Massachusetts Institute of Technology (PhD)
- Known for: Experimental physics of gravitational wave detection, LIGO-India, quantum metrology, intelligent control, noise reduction
- Awards: New Horizons in Physics Prize (2019); Co-recipient Albert Einstein Medal (2017)
- Scientific career
- Institutions: California Institute of Technology; Tata Institute of Fundamental Research
- Thesis: Sensitivity and Noise Analysis of 4 km Laser Interferometric Gravitational Wave Antennae (2004)
- Doctoral advisor: Rainer Weiss; Peter Fritschel
- Website: caltechexperimentalgravity.github.io

Rana Adhikari (born 1974) is an American experimental physicist. He is a professor of physics at the California Institute of Technology (Caltech) and an associate faculty member of the International Centre for Theoretical Sciences of Tata Institute of Fundamental Research (ICTS-TIFR).

Adhikari works on the experimental physics of gravitational wave detection and is among the scientists responsible for the U.S.-based Laser Interferometer Gravitational-wave Observatory (LIGO) that discovered gravitational waves in 2015. He, along with Lisa Barsotti and Matt Evans from MIT, received the New Horizons in Physics Prize in 2019 "for research on current and future earth-based gravitational wave detectors". His research focus is on the areas of precision measurement related to surpassing fundamental physical limits to discover new phenomena related to gravity, quantum mechanics, and the true nature of space and time.

Adhikari is actively involved in the LIGO-India project, which aims to build a gravitational-wave observatory in India. He was elected as a Fellow of the American Physical Society and a member of Optica (formerly known as Optical Society of America). Since 2019 he has been a member of the Infosys Prize jury for physical sciences.

== Personal life ==
Adhikari was born in the U.S. state of Ohio to Indian Bengali immigrants from Raiganj, West Bengal, India. They moved to Cape Canaveral, Florida when he was seven. He studied physics at the University of Florida, where he worked with David Reitze, and graduated in 1998 with a bachelor's degree. In 2004, he received a PhD in physics from the Massachusetts Institute of Technology under the supervision of experimental physicist Rainer Weiss, and joined Caltech's Laser Interferometer Gravitational-Wave Observatory (LIGO) project as a postdoctoral researcher. Adhikari was promoted as an assistant professor in 2006 and become a tenured professor of physics in 2012. He has also been an adjunct professor at the International Centre for Theoretical Sciences at the Tata Institute of Fundamental Research (ICTS-TIFR) in Bengaluru, India, since 2012.

== Research ==
Adhikari has been involved in the construction and design of gravitational-wave detectors since 1997. He started working on laser interferometers as a graduate student at MIT, with a particular focus on the variety of noise sources, feedback loops and subsystems, and helped to reduce the noise in all 3 of the LIGO interferometers while working on the Livingston interferometer. In 2005, he received the first LIGO thesis prize.

The Adhikari Research Group, part of the Division of Physics, Mathematics, and Astronomy at Caltech, focuses on new detector technologies for fundamental physics experiments (gravitational waves, dark matter, and near field gravity). Adhikari is also affiliated with the Caltech Material Science Department and together they work on advancing mechanical oscillators, nonlinear optics, acoustic metamaterials, and high efficiency photodetection for quantum measurements.

Adhikari has collaborated with Kathryn Zurek to develop a new experiment that uses tabletop instruments to observe signatures of quantum gravity. Adhikari has also been working on alternative dark matter models. and space-based gravitational-wave detectors. He routinely collaborates with the international gravitational-wave community OzGrav, KAGRA and GEO600.

== LIGO-India ==
In 2007, during the International Conference on Gravitation and Cosmology (ICGC) at the Inter-University Centre for Astronomy and Astrophysics (IUCAA), Pune, the idea of having a LIGO observatory in India was first proposed by Rana X. Adhikari. The IndIGO Consortium was formed in 2009 and since then has been planning a roadmap for gravitational-wave astronomy and a phased strategy towards Indian participation in realizing a gravitational-wave observatory in the Asia-Pacific region.

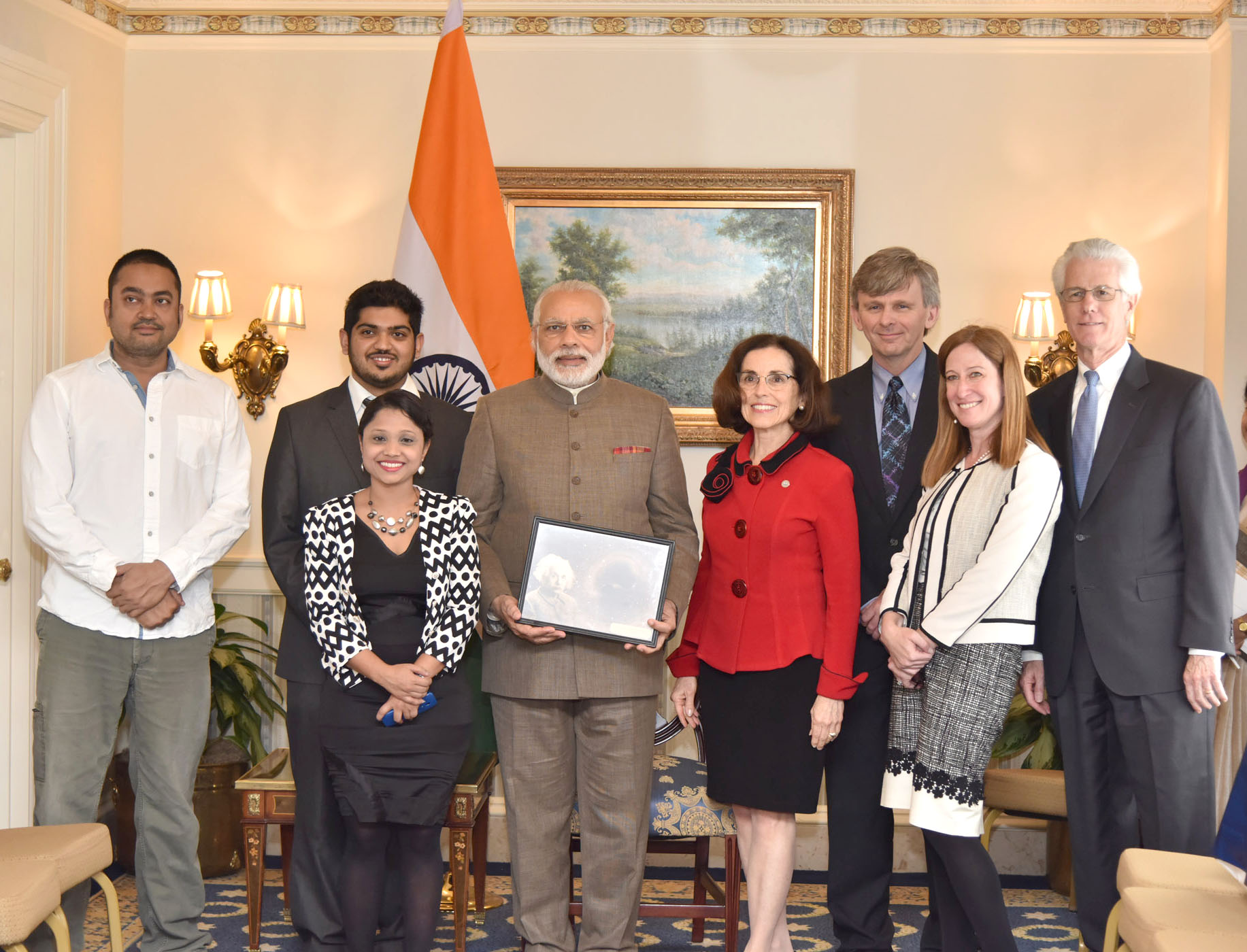
Adhikari (on left) at LIGO-India MoU Signing Ceremony

On February 17, 2016, less than a week after LIGO's landmark announcement about the detection of gravitational waves, Indian Prime Minister Narendra Modi announced that the Cabinet has granted 'in-principle' approval to the LIGO-India mega science proposal. The Indian gravitational-wave detector would be only the sixth such observatory in the world and will be similar to the two U.S. detectors in Hanford, Washington and Livingston, Louisiana. A Memorandum of Understanding (MoU) was signed on March 31, 2016, between the Department of Atomic Energy and Department of Science & Technology in India and the National Science Foundation of the U.S. to develop the observatory in India.

Adhikari was part of the delegation that met with the Prime Minister of India Narendra Modi in Washington, DC, for the signing of the MoU between India and the U.S. to build a LIGO detector in India. In an interview with Quartz India, Adhikari said, "The presence of world-class infrastructure in the form of the LIGO detector and the latest R&D will attract the right talent for experimental physics from all across the country." In order to support the upcoming project, LIGO laboratory in Caltech has been hosting, for many years, talented and motivated undergraduate students from Indian institutions, pre-selected by LIGO-India Science Collaboration, as part of the International LIGO SURF program.

== Scientific art and media ==
Adhikari was the subject of the documentary LIGO: The Way the Universe is, I think directed by Hussain Currimbhoy, Carrie McCarthy, and Mark Pedri. Screened at DOC NYC, San Francisco Documentary Film Festival, the RAW Science Film Festival in Los Angeles, and the Cineglobe Film Festival at CERN, Geneva, the short film focuses on a mechanic-turned-scientist who tuned the machine that spurred a dramatic re-envisioning of the universe through the detection of gravitational waves.

In July 2017, he was part of Limits of Knowing, a month-long set of exhibitions and programs organized with the Berliner Festspiele. For this exhibition, he presented a prototype of an artwork designed to sense the environment of the Martin-Gropius-Bau. The 30 x 30 x 130 cm immersive mixed media artwork named Untitled reacted to the space and all objects in it (including the visitors) by recording a variety of data: the building's vibrations, sounds, temperature, magnetic fields, and levels of infrared light.

Later that year, on the anniversary of the first detection of gravitational waves, LA artist Rachel Mason's Singularity Song was released, as part of a fiscally sponsored program of Fulcrum Arts, Pasadena. Singularity Song is a meditation on black holes, pairing legendary butoh dancer Oguri with the voices of Caltech Theoretical Physicist Kip Thorne, Rana X. Adhikari, indie rock icon Carla Bozulich and experimental composer Anna Homler.

In January 2020, Scientific Inquirer posted an exchange between Australian recording artist Tex Crick and Adhikari, in which they discuss time travel using a mirror and listening to music in four dimensions. He was on the Y combinator podcast discussing the technical challenges of measuring gravitational waves. He also appeared on Seeker's The Good, the Bad, and the Science Podcast (The Science of Men in Black) and has collaborated with Pioneer Works' Director of Sciences Janna Levin.

Adhikari appeared on How the Universe Works, a documentary series aired on the Discovery Science Channel. In the episode Mystery of Spacetime (season 6 episode 10) he ponders on the secret structure that controls our universe, time, light, and energy. He will appear in the feature-length documentary The Faraway, Nearby that examines the life of physicist Joseph Weber - the first scientist to explore the detection of gravitational waves. Alan Lightman is the co-creator of the science film.

Adhikari will also be seen in BBC Studios Science Unit and Bilibili's Odyssey: Into The Future, a 3-part science series featuring Chinese science fiction author Liu Cixin and many of the futuristic concepts that inspired The Three-Body Problem series of novels.

== Awards and recognition ==
- 2019 New Horizons in Physics: Breakthrough Foundation
- 2018 American Physical Society Fellow
- 2017 co-recipient Albert Einstein Medal
- 2017 co-recipient Princess of Asturias Award
- 2017 co-recipient Physics World: Breakthrough of the Year Award
- 2017 co-recipient Bruno Rossi Prize
- 2017 co-recipient Group Award of the Royal Astronomical Society
- 2016 co-recipient Physics World: Breakthrough of the Year Award
- 2016 co-recipient Gruber Cosmology Prize
- 2016 co-recipient Special Breakthrough Prize in Fundamental Physics
- 2016 Recognition by California Legislature

== See also ==
- Laser Interferometer Gravitational-wave Observatory (LIGO)
