= Anna Grassellino =

Italian physicist

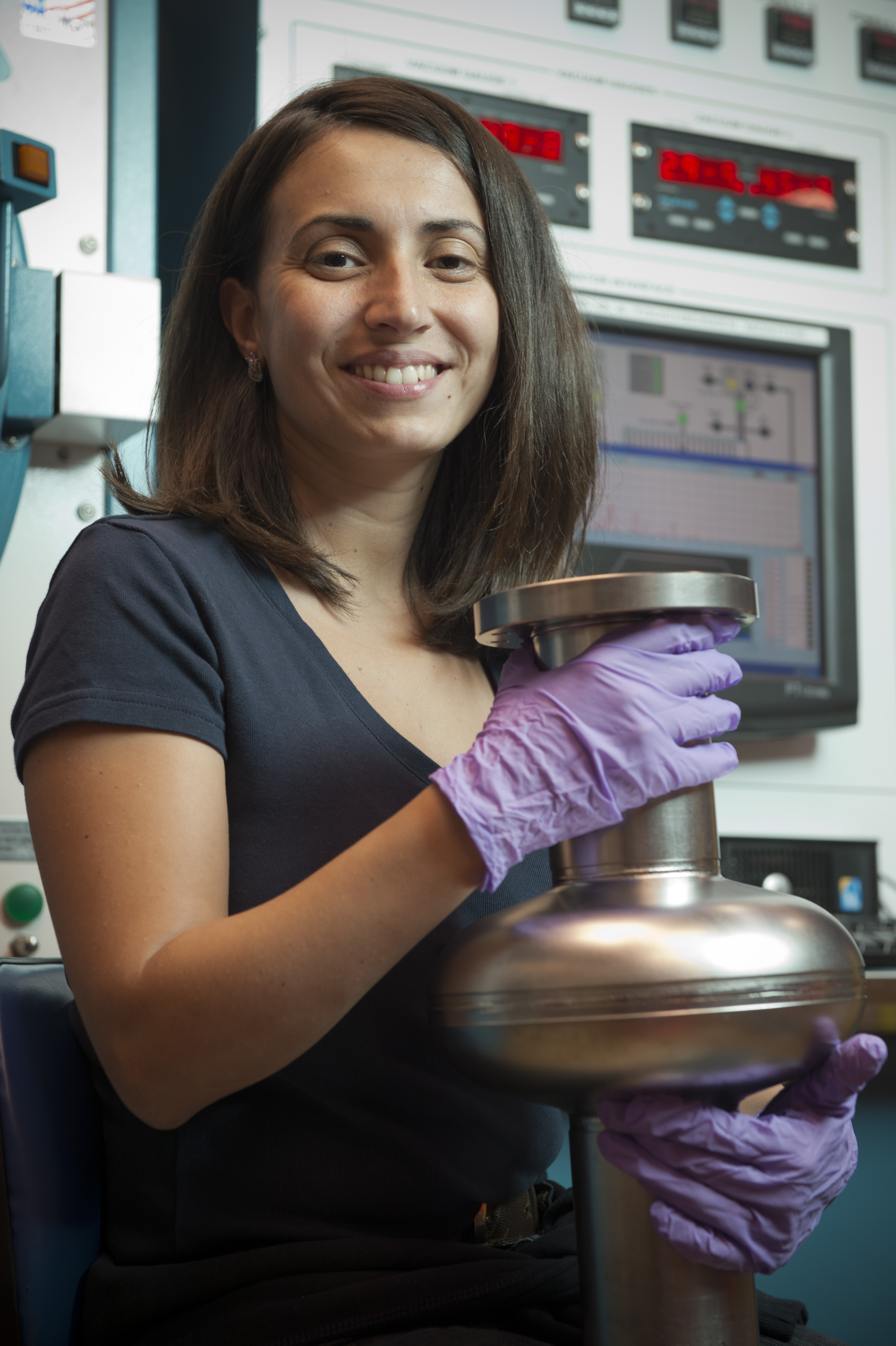
- Grassellino in Fermilab with single-cell cavity in 2012
- Education: University of Pisa; University of Pennsylvania
- Awards: IEEE Particle Accelerator Science and Technology Award (2016); Presidential Early Career Award for Scientists and Engineers (2017); The IPAC Frank Sacherer Prize (2017); New Horizons in Physics Prize (2023)
- Scientific career
- Fields: Accelerator physics; Superconducting radio frequency
- Workplaces: Fermilab

Anna Grassellino (born 1981) is an Italian and American physicist, Senior Scientist and, since 2020, Director of the SQMS (Superconducting Quantum Materials and Systems) Center at Fermilab. In 2017 she was awarded the Presidential Early Career Award for Scientists and Engineers by Barack Obama.

== Early life and education ==
Grassellino is from the Southern city of Marsala in Italy. She attended the Scientific High School of Marsala graduating cum laude. She studied electronic engineering at the University of Pisa, graduating in 2005 with a thesis in microelectronics. She spent the summer of 2004 as an intern at Fermilab and met Nigel Lockyer. She joined the University of Pennsylvania for her graduate studies. For her doctorate, she specialized in superconducting radio frequency technology and applied physics working with Nigel Lockyer. In 2009 she was awarded the top young researcher poster prize at the International Particle Accelerator Conference. She worked in Philadelphia and at TRIUMF in Vancouver, and eventually graduated in 2011.

== Research and career ==
Grassellino was appointed as a postdoctoral researcher at Fermilab in 2012. She was then appointed Scientist in 2015 and Senior Scientist in 2018. Grassellino has covered leadership roles at Fermilab starting from group leader in 2014 to Deputy Division Head in 2016 and Deputy Chief Technology Officer in 2019. Since 2020 she is the Director of the SQMS (Superconducting Quantum Materials and Systems) Center at Fermilab. She also currently manages an Associate Professor position at Northwestern University where she is Co-Director of CAPST (Center for Applied Physics and Superconducting Technology).

She is known for her pioneering work in superconducting radio frequency cavities for next generation particle accelerators. As a postdoc, Grassellino experimented with introducing a small amount of nitrogen into the inner surface of the cavities, which are made of niobium and surface treated using electropolishing. She and her group noticed that residual nitrogen remaining in the cavity systematically improved the RF superconductivity response. By baking the niobium SRF cavities at high temperatures in the presence of nitrogen, the Q factors more than tripled; dramatically reducing the cryogenic costs of the large accelerator facilities. She made the discovery of nitrogen doping by accident, hoping to create niobium nitride but instead found with her FNAL group – via material and surface science studies – that the real effect was due to nitrogen as interstitial. Superconducting radio frequency cavities generate high energy with high current and expel magnetic flux, which can result in power dissipation. The technology has been adopted as the standard for SRF cavities and used in laboratories all over the world, as well as private firms. The LCLS-II HE upgrades at SLAC are the first world class accelerator facilities to be built entirely with the nitrogen doping technology. In 2015, she was awarded a $2.5 million Early Career Award from the United States Department of Energy, which allowed her to employ postdoctoral fellows.

Grassellino has given several international talks, including the keynote talk at the American Association for the Advancement of Science Innovations in Accelerator Science conference in 2015. In 2016 she hosted Matteo Renzi at Fermilab, who asked her to support him in representing Italians Abroad. She won the Institute of Electrical and Electronics Engineers Particle Accelerator Science and Technology Award in 2016, the U.S. Particle Accelerator School's Prize for Achievement in Accelerator Physics and Technology in 2017, and the 2017 Frank Sacherer Prize for early-career achievement in the accelerator field. She was awarded the Presidential Early Career Award for Scientists and Engineers in 2017 from Barack Obama. She has given popular science lectures in Italy and America. She is the co-director of the Fermilab and Northwestern Center for Applied Physics and Superconducting Technologies (CAPST). In 2018, she was awarded the highest honour of the Rotary Club of Marsala Lilibeo.

Grassellino is a member of the Illinois State Board of Education.

== Honors ==
- In 2017, Grassellino was awarded the Presidential Early Career Award for Scientists and Engineers by Barack Obama.
- In 2020, she was elected Fellow of the American Physical Society.
- In 2022, Grasselino was awarded the 2023 New Horizons Prize in fundamental physics from the Breakthrough Prize Foundation.
