= Andrea Young =

American experimental physicist

- Born: around 1984
- Education: Columbia University
- Known for: van der Waals heterostructures
- Awards: New Horizons in Physics Prize
- Scientific career
- Fields: Experimental physics
- Workplaces: University of California, Santa Barbara
- Thesis: Quantum transport in graphene heterostructures
- Doctoral advisor: Philip Kim
- Website: afylab.com

Andrea F. Young is an American experimental physicist and professor at the University of California, Santa Barbara. In 2018, he was awarded the New Horizons in Physics Prize for his work on van der Waals heterostructures and quantum Hall phases.

== Education and career ==
Young received his bachelor's degree in 2006 and his doctoral degree in 2012 from Columbia University, where he studied the properties of graphene. From 2011 to 2014, he was a Pappalardo Fellow in experimental condensed matter physics at Massachusetts Institute of Technology (MIT). Following his postdoctoral fellowship at MIT, he was a visiting scientist at the Weizmann Institute of Science. Young joined the faculty at University of California, Santa Barbara (UCSB) in 2015.

== Awards and honors ==
In 2016, Young was awarded the William McMillan Prize from the University of Illinois Department of Physics and the Packard Fellowship for Science and Engineering. He was additionally a recipient of an AFOSR Young Investigator grant (2016) Young was awarded a Sloan Research Fellowship in 2017. He received the 2018 New Horizons in Physics Prize.
