= Norma Graham =

American psychologist

- Born: August 8, 1944; St. Louis
- Education: Stanford University (BS); University of Pennsylvania (Ph.D.)
- Scientific career
- Fields: Psychology, visual perception, human psychophysics, visual behavior and neurophysiology
- Institutions: Columbia University

Norma Van Surdam Graham (born August 8, 1944) is an American psychologist, neuroscientist and the Centennial Professor of Psychology at Columbia University. She has been a faculty member at Columbia since 1972. She has been elected to several scholarly societies, including the National Academy of Sciences.

== Biography ==
Graham earned an undergraduate degree in mathematics from Stanford University and a Ph.D. in psychology from the University of Pennsylvania. After a postdoctoral fellowship in visual neuroscience at Rockefeller University from 1970 to 1972, Graham joined the faculty at Columbia University. She was named a full professor in 1982 and department chair in 2007.

Graham developed mathematical models to interpret experimental results in psychophysical and neurophysiological studies. Her early research interest included building psychophysical models that examine 4 different visual processes. She has focused in particular on the portions of visual processing that are "far from the input end (the light hitting the retina) and also far from the output end (conscious perception and control of action)." In 1989, she published her book Visual Pattern Analyzers, which investigated different channels in visual perception that are sensitive to different frequency ranges and orientation, and the development of multidimensional signal detection theory.

== Awards and honors ==
She was elected a member of the National Academy of Sciences (1998) and a fellow of several academic societies, including the American Academy of Arts and Sciences (1993), the American Association for the Advancement of Science (2016), the Society of Experimental Psychologists (1983) and the Optical Society of America (1986).

== Personal life ==
Norma Graham was born on August 8, 1944 in St. Louis, Missouri. With partner Wayne Wickelgren, she had 3 children: physicist Peter W. Graham (1980), mathematician Kirsten Wickelgren (1981), and Jeanette Wickelgren (1985).
