= Lisa Barsotti =

Gravitational wave researcher

Prof Lisa Barsotti
- Education: University of Pisa
- Known for: Gravitational waves
- Scientific career
- Workplaces: Massachusetts Institute of Technology
- Thesis: The control of the Virgo interferometer for gravitational wave detection (2006)
- Doctoral advisor: Francesco Fidecaro, Matteo Barsuglia
- Website: space.mit.edu/people/barsotti-lisa

Lisa Barsotti is a principal research scientist at the Massachusetts Institute of Technology Kavli Institute at the LIGO Laboratory, beginning her career in 2010.

== Biography ==
Barsotti was born June 1,1978 and was raised in Pisa, Italy. She obtained her PhD in applied physics from University of Pisa in 2006 on The control of the Virgo interferometer for gravitational wave detection and moved to the United States in 2007 to work on the Laser Interferometer Gravitational-wave Observatory (LIGO).

Barsotti was involved in the discovery of gravitational waves reported in 2016.

She currently investigates technology to improve gravitational wave detection using squeezed states of life, which led an upgrade to LIGO in 2017, known as Virgo.

Main themes of her work include astronomy, remote sensing, optics, interferometry, laser, electric field, and sensitivity.

Reflecting on her work, she has expressed that, even in the years before detections were made, she found fulfillment in the challenge of utilizing highly sophisticated instruments and contributing to the understanding of Einstein's Theory of General Relativity. She admires the hard work and diverse knowledge of those she's worked with. She views the prize as a recognition of the collective efforts of scientists worldwide who have pushed the boundaries of gravitational wave research.

== Honors and awards ==
- 2018 – Fellow of the American Physical Society for "extraordinary leadership in commissioning the Advanced LIGO detectors, improving their sensitivity through implementation of squeezed light, and enhancing the operation of the gravitational wave detector network through joint run planning between LIGO and Virgo"
- 2019 – Breakthrough New Horizons in Physics Prize
- 2019 – Capperuccio Prize of the city of Livorno
- 2021 – One of InspiringFifty in Italy
- 2022 - Research.com Best Female Scientist Award
- 2023 - Research.com Best Female Scientist Award
- 2024 - Research.com Best Female Scientist Award

== Selected publications ==
- Abbott, B. P.; et al. (11 February 2016). "Observation of Gravitational Waves from a Binary Black Hole Merger". Physical Review Letters. 116 (6) 061102. arXiv:1602.03837. Bibcode:2016PhRvL.116f1102A. doi:10.1103/PhysRevLett.116.061102. PMID 26918975. S2CID 119286014.
- Aasi, J.; et al. (9 April 2015). "Advanced LIGO". Classical and Quantum Gravity. 32 (7) 074001. arXiv:1411.4547. Bibcode:2015CQGra..32g4001L. doi:10.1088/0264-9381/32/7/074001. S2CID 118570458.
- Abbott, B. P.; et al. (15 June 2016). "GW151226: Observation of Gravitational Waves from a 22-Solar-Mass Binary Black Hole Coalescence". Physical Review Letters. 116 (24) 241103. arXiv:1606.04855. Bibcode:2016PhRvL.116x1103A. doi:10.1103/PhysRevLett.116.241103. PMID 27367379. S2CID 118651851.
- Barsotti, Lisa (2014). "Quantum Noise Reduction in the LIGO Gravitational Wave Interferometer with Squeezed States of Light". Cleo: 2014 AW3P.4. Bibcode:2014cleo.conf..137B. doi:10.1364/CLEO_AT.2014.AW3P.4. ISBN 978-1-55752-999-2. S2CID 28876707.
