= Laura Pérez =

Laura Pérez may refer to:

- Laura Pérez (astronomer)
- Laura Pérez Vernetti, Spanish Catalan cartoonist and illustrator
- Laura Pérez Granel, Spanish comic illustrator and writer
