= Daniel Harlow =

American physicist

- Born: Cincinnati, Ohio

Academic background
- Education: Columbia University (BA); Stanford University (PhD)

Daniel Harlow is the Jerrold R. Zacharias Career Development Associate Professor of Physics at the Massachusetts Institute of Technology.

== Biography ==
Harlow was born in Cincinnati and grew up in Boston and Chicago. He received his B.A. from Columbia University in 2006 and his Ph.D. from Stanford University in 2012. Before joining MIT's faculty in July 2017, he was a postdoctoral fellow at Princeton University and Harvard University.

His research is focused on understanding black holes and cosmology, viewed through the lens of quantum field theory and quantum gravity.

Harlow won the New Horizons in Physics Prize in 2019 for "fundamental insights about quantum information, quantum field theory, and gravity." He was also named a Sloan Research Fellow in 2019, and in 2020, he was named a Packard Fellow.
