= Nienke van der Marel =

Dutch astronomer

Nienke van der Marel (born 1986) is a Dutch astronomer whose research focuses on the formation of exoplanets through interplanetary dust trapping and protoplanetary disks. She is an assistant professor in the Leiden Observatory of Leiden University.

== Education and career ==
Van der Marel was born in Groningen in 1986. She was educated through the Leiden Observatory, receiving her bachelor's degree in physics and astronomy in 2009, her master's degree in 2011, and her Ph.D. in 2015. Her doctoral dissertation, Mind the gap: gas and dust in planet-forming disks, was supervised by Ewine van Dishoeck.

She did postdoctoral research as a Beatrice Watson Parrent Fellow at the University of Hawaii from 2015 to 2017, as an NRC Research fellow at the NRC Herzberg Astronomy and Astrophysics Research Centre in Victoria, Canada from 2017 to 2019, and as a Banting Fellow at the University of Victoria in Canada from 2019 to 2021. In 2021 she returned to the Leiden Observatory as an assistant professor.

== Recognition ==
Van der Marel was a 2024 recipient of the New Horizons in Physics Prize, with her coauthors Laura M. Pérez, Paola Pinilla, and Til Birnstiel, given "for the prediction, discovery, and modeling of dust traps in young circumstellar disks, solving a long-standing problem in planet formation".

Minor planet 12942 van der Marel is named for van der Marel.

== Selected publications ==
- van der Marel, Nienke; van Dishoeck, Ewine F.; Bruderer, Simon; Birnstiel, Til; Pinilla, Paola; Dullemond, Cornelis P.; van Kempen, Tim A.; Schmalzl, Markus; Brown, Joanna M.; Herczeg, Gregory J.; Mathews, Geoffrey S.; Geers, Vincent (June 2013), "A major asymmetric dust trap in a transition disk", Science, 340 (6137): 1199–1202, arXiv:1306.1768, Bibcode:2013Sci...340.1199V, doi:10.1126/science.1236770, JSTOR 41985457, PMID 23744942
- van der Marel, N.; van Dishoeck, E. F.; Bruderer, S.; Andrews, S. M.; Pontoppidan, K. M.; Herczeg, G. J.; van Kempen, T.; Miotello, A. (2016), "Resolved gas cavities in transitional disks inferred from CO isotopologs with ALMA", Astronomy & Astrophysics, 585 A58, arXiv:1511.07149, Bibcode:2016A&A...585A..58V, doi:10.1051/0004-6361/201526988
- van der Marel, Nienke; Williams, Jonathan P.; Ansdell, M.; Manara, Carlo F.; Miotello, Anna; Tazzari, Marco; Testi, Leonardo; Hogerheijde, Michiel; Bruderer, Simon; Terwisga, Sierk E. van; Dishoeck, Ewine F. van (February 2018), "New insights into the nature of transition disks from a complete disk survey of the Lupus star-forming region", The Astrophysical Journal, 854 (2) 177, arXiv:1801.06154, Bibcode:2018ApJ...854..177V, doi:10.3847/1538-4357/aaaa6b
- van der Marel, Nienke; Dong, Ruobing; di Francesco, James; Williams, Jonathan P.; Tobin, John (February 2019), "Protoplanetary disk rings and gaps across ages and luminosities", The Astrophysical Journal, 872 (1) 112, arXiv:1901.03680, Bibcode:2019ApJ...872..112V, doi:10.3847/1538-4357/aafd31
- van der Marel, Nienke; Birnstiel, Til; Garufi, Antonio; Ragusa, Enrico; Christiaens, Valentin; Price, Daniel J.; Sallum, Steph; Muley, Dhruv; Francis, Logan; Dong, Ruobing (December 2020), "On the diversity of asymmetries in gapped protoplanetary disks", The Astronomical Journal, 161 (1) 33, arXiv:2010.10568, doi:10.3847/1538-3881/abc3ba
- van der Marel, Nienke; Mulders, Gijs D. (June 2021), "A stellar mass dependence of structured disks: a possible link with exoplanet demographics", The Astronomical Journal, 162 (1): 28, arXiv:2104.06838, Bibcode:2021AJ....162...28V, doi:10.3847/1538-3881/ac0255
