= Shinsei Ryu =

Japanese theoretical physicist (born 1977)

Shinsei Ryū (Japanese: 笠真生, Ryū Shinsei; 1977) is a Japanese theoretical physicist who works in theoretical solid-state physics. He is currently a professor at Princeton University.

== Career ==
Ryū studied physics at the University of Tokyo, receiving a bachelor's degree in 2000 and a master's degree in 2002, and received his doctorate there in 2005 under Yasuhiro Hatsugai. As a postdoctoral researcher, he was at the Kavli Institute for Theoretical Physics until 2008, where he worked with Tadashi Takayanagi. From 2008 to 2011 he was at the University of California, Berkeley. From 2011 to 2017 he was an assistant professor at the University of Illinois Urbana-Champaign. He then worked as an associate professor at the University of Chicago before moving to Princeton.

His theoretical work involves solid-state systems in which quantum mechanical and topological phenomena play a special role. For example, unconventional superconductivity, carbon nanotubes, graphene, and topological insulators. He also used methods from string theory.

Ryū is known for a 2006 paper with Tadashi Takayanagi, later known as the Ryu–Takayanagi conjecture, in which they calculated the entropy from quantum entanglement in conformal field theory via the Bekenstein-Hawking entropy of black holes in the context of Juan Maldacena's holographic principle and conformal field theories on a surface correspond to a gravitational theory in the enclosed volume. This also has applications in solid-state physics, since conformal field theories also play a role in many systems at the critical point. With Andreas Schnyder, Akira Furusaki and Andreas Ludwig he developed the periodic table of topological insulators and topological superconductors.

== Honors and awards ==
In 2002/03 he was a fellow of the Japan Society for the Promotion of Science and in 2014 one of the Sloan Fellows. In 2012 he received the Prize for Solid State Physics in Japan, in 2013 the Nishinomiya-Yukawa Memorial Prize, in 2015 the Breakthrough Prize in Fundamental Physics together with Tadashi Takayanagi, Horacio Casini, and Marina Huerta and the Nishina Memorial Prize with Akira Furusaki. In 2024 he was again awarded the Dirac Medal of the ICTP together with Tadashi Takayanagi, Horacio Casini and Marina Huerta.

== Publications ==
- Shinsei Ryu, Takayanagi: Holographic derivation of entanglement entropy from AdS/CFT. In: Physical Review Letters. Band 96, 2006, S. 181602, Arxiv
- Shinsei Ryu, Andreas Schnyder, Akira Furusaki, Andreas Ludwig: Topological insulators and superconductors: ten-fold way and dimensional hierarchy. In: New J. Phys. Band 12, 2010, S. 065010, Arxiv
