= Rebecca Jensen-Clem =

American astronomer and adaptive optics researcher

- Education: Massachusetts Institute of Technology (B.S.); California Institute of Technology (M.S., Ph.D.)
- Known for: Extreme adaptive optics; direct imaging of exoplanets
- Awards: New Horizons in Physics Prize (2025); Miller Research Fellowship (2017–2020)
- Scientific career
- Fields: Astronomy; Astrophysics; Adaptive optics
- Workplaces: University of California, Santa Cruz; University of California, Berkeley (Miller Fellow)
- Website: rmjc.sites.ucsc.edu

Rebecca Jensen-Clem is an American astronomer at the University of California, Santa Cruz whose research focuses on extreme adaptive optics and high-contrast imaging for the direct detection and characterization of exoplanets. In 2025 she shared the New Horizons in Physics Prize for demonstrating new extreme adaptive-optics techniques that will enable the direct detection of the smallest exoplanets.

== Early life and education ==
Jensen-Clem earned a B.S. degree from the Massachusetts Institute of Technology (2008–2012) and M.S. and Ph.D. degrees in astronomy from the California Institute of Technology (2012–2017).

== Career and research ==
From 2017 to 2020 Jensen-Clem was a Miller Research Fellow at the University of California, Berkeley, hosted by astronomer James Graham. In 2020 she joined the faculty at UC Santa Cruz, where she leads the Santa Cruz Extreme Adaptive Optics Laboratory (SEAL), a visible/near-infrared testbed for wavefront sensing and control, coronagraphy, and predictive control for segmented-aperture telescopes.

Her work advances extreme adaptive optics for high-contrast imaging on large ground-based telescopes, including on-sky development for the Keck II AO system and laboratory development on SEAL. She and collaborators have reported results in predictive wavefront control and related techniques for coronagraphic exoplanet imaging.

Jensen-Clem is a co-investigator on the SCALES (Slicer Combined with Array of Lenslets for Exoplanet Spectroscopy) instrument for the W. M. Keck Observatory, aimed at discovering and characterizing cold exoplanets in the 2–5 μm band, and has worked with collaborators on the Keck Planet Imager and Characterizer (KPIC), a high-resolution instrument for directly imaged exoplanets.

In addition to her faculty role, Jensen-Clem has led the UC Santa Cruz Center for Adaptive Optics since 2022, overseeing programs including the annual AO Summer School and community training activities.

== Awards and honors ==
- New Horizons in Physics Prize (2025), shared with Sebastiaan Haffert and Maaike van Kooten, "for demonstrating new extreme adaptive optics techniques that will allow the direct detection of the smallest exoplanets."
- Miller Research Fellowship, University of California, Berkeley (2017–2020).

== Selected publications ==
- Jensen-Clem, R. et al. "A new standard for assessing the performance of high-contrast imaging systems." (2017).
- Jensen-Clem, R. et al. "The Santa Cruz Extreme AO Lab (SEAL): Design and First Light." (2021).
- Skemer, A. et al. "Design of SCALES: A 2–5 μm Coronagraphic Integral Field Spectrograph for Keck Observatory." (2022).
- Jovanovic, N. et al. "Technical description and performance of the phase II version of KPIC." JATIS 11 (1), 015005 (2025).
