= Olivier Doré =

Olivier Doré is a cosmologist, who is currently working as research scientist in Jet Propulsion Laboratory and visiting associate faculty at the California Institute of Technology.

== Awards ==
- Breakthrough Prize in Fundamental Physics, December 2017
- UC Irvine, Distinguished Visiting Professor, 2017, date
- Laboratoire d’Astrophysique de Marseille (LAM), Aix-Marseille Universit´e, France, Visiting Professor, 2017, 1 month
- JPL Voyager award, May 2016
- JPL Team award for outstanding contribution to the SPHEREx Proposal Team, February 2015
- JPL Mariner award, May 2013
- Gruber 2012 Cosmology Prize awarded to Charles Bennett and the WMAP team
- NASA Group Achievement Award (as a member of the NASA Planck satellite science team), May 2009, May 2010, September 2014
- NASA Group Achievement Award (as a member of the NASA WMAP satellite science team), May 2007
- Fellow of the Société de secours des amis des sciences,
