= Raffaella Margutti =

Italian astronomer

Raffaella Margutti is an Italian multi-messenger astronomer. Her research combines the insights from electromagnetic, neutrino, and gravitational-wave observations of high-energy cosmic events, including neutron stars, black holes, supernovae, gamma-ray bursts, and fast blue optical transients. She is an associate professor in the departments of physics and astronomy at the University of California, Berkeley.

== Education and career ==
Margutti was a student at the University of Milano-Bicocca, where she received a laurea (an Italian undergraduate degree) in 2006, and completed her Ph.D. in physics and astronomy in 2010. Her doctoral dissertation, Toward new insights on the gamma ray bursts physics: From x-ray spectroscopy to the identification of characteristic time scale, was jointly supervised by Guido Chincarini and Cristiano Guidorzi.

After postdoctoral research at the Harvard–Smithsonian Center for Astrophysics and New York University, she joined Northwestern University as an assistant professor in 2016, and was promoted to associate professor there in 2020. She moved to the University of California, Berkeley in 2021.

== Recognition ==
Margutti was a 2022 recipient of the New Horizons in Physics Prize, "for leadership in laying foundations for electromagnetic observations of sources of gravitational waves, and leadership in extracting rich information from the first observed collision of two neutron stars". She was a 2025 recipient of the Presidential Early Career Award for Scientists and Engineers.
