= Michele Limon =

Italian physicist

- Born: 6 August 1961 (age 65); Milan, Italy
- Education: University of Milan
- Awards: Breakthrough Prize in Fundamental Physics (2017); Gruber Prize (2012)
- Scientific career
- Fields: Cosmology; Cosmic microwave background
- Workplaces: University of Pennsylvania, Columbia University, NASA Goddard Space Flight Center, Princeton University

Michele Limon is an Italian research scientist at the University of Pennsylvania. Limon studied physics at the Università degli Studi di Milano in Milan, Italy and completed his post-doctoral work at the University of California, Berkeley. He has been conducting research for more than 30 years and has experience in the design of ground, balloon and space-based instrumentation. His academic specialties include Astrophysics, Cosmology, Instrumentation Development, and Cryogenics.

As a research scientist at Princeton University from 1996 to 2001, Limon worked on the Wilkinson Microwave Anisotropy Probe (WMAP) project with NASA. WMAP was a NASA Explorer mission that launched June 2001 to make fundamental measurements of cosmology-the study of the properties of the universe as a whole. WMAP was extremely successful, producing the new Standard Model of Cosmology. Limon continued working on WMAP at NASA Goddard Space Flight Center from 2001 to 2008. Limon and the WMAP team received the 2012 Gruber Yale Cosmology Prize and 2018 Breakthrough Prize in Fundamental Physics for their contributions to modern cosmology.

In 2008, Limon moved to Columbia University as a research scientist to build the E and B Experiment (EBEX), a balloon-borne microwave telescope designed to measure the polarization of the Cosmic Microwave Background (CMB). It collected data during an 11-day science flight over Antarctica. Limon is currently working on the Simons Observatory, a suite of ground-based telescopes in the Atacama Desert in Chile designed to measure the intensity and polarization of the CMB. The Simons Observatory aims to reveal information about the contents and energy density of matter in the Universe and test theories of inflation.
