= Maaike van Kooten =

Canadian optical engineer

Maaike Anna Maria van Kooten (born 1992) is a Canadian optical engineer who works at the NRC Herzberg Astronomy and Astrophysics Research Centre in Victoria, British Columbia, where she develops and researches adaptive optics for astronomical applications.

== Early life, education, and career ==
Van Kooten was born in 1992 in Richmond, British Columbia. She grew up in British Columbia as one of four daughters of Gerrit Cornelis (Kees) van Kooten, a Dutch and Canadian natural resource economist at the University of British Columbia and later the University of Victoria. Her father also had an appointment at Wageningen University in the Netherlands, and she lived there and in Reno, Nevada before completing her high school education at Lambrick Park Secondary School in Saanich, British Columbia.

She majored in physics and astronomy at the University of Victoria, during which she spent three co-op terms at the Herzberg Research Centre, working in public outreach, analyzing astronomical data, and working with fiber optics in an optics laboratory. After graduating in 2014, she went on to receive a master's degree in mechanical engineering at the University of Victoria in 2016.

Aiming for a doctoral program focusing on astronomical instrumentation, van Kooten continued her studies at Leiden University in the Netherlands. She completed her doctorate there in 2020. Her dissertation, Predicting the future: Predictive control for astronomical adaptive optics, was promoted by Niek Doelman and co-promoted by Matthew Kenworthy.

She returned to Canada and the Herzberg Centre after postdoctoral research with Rebecca Jensen-Clem at the University of California, Santa Cruz.

== Recognition ==
Van Kooten was a 2025 recipient of the New Horizons in Physics Prize, awarded to her and her collaborators (Jensen-Clem and Sebastiaan Haffert) "for demonstrating new extreme adaptive optics techniques that will allow the direct detection of the smallest exoplanets".
