= Peter W. Graham =

American physicist

Peter Wickelgren Graham

Personal details
- Born: Eugene, Oregon, Oregon, U.S.
- Spouse: Lauren Graham
- Children: 2
- Education: Harvard University (AB); Harvard University (AM); Stanford University (Ph.D.)

Peter W. Graham is a professor of physics at Stanford University.

== Early life ==
Graham was born to Wayne Wickelgren and Norma Graham. He has 4 siblings including mathematician Kirsten Wickelgren and American lawyer Abraham Wickelgren. He graduated from Stuyvesant High School. He is grandson of psychologist Frances K. Graham and great-grandson of surgeon Evarts Ambrose Graham.

== Education ==
Graham attended Harvard University, graduating with an AB and AM in 2002. He studied physics. He received a Ph.D. in physics from Stanford University in 2007. He was advised by Savas Dimopoulos.

== Career ==
Graham became an assistant professor at Stanford in 2010.

He is interested in physics beyond the Standard Model, both theoretically and through proposals for novel experiments using techniques from astrophysics, atomic physics, and solid-state physics.

He proposed, with Surjeet Rajendran and others, the Cosmic Axion Spin Precession Experiment (CASPEr), which aims to detect axions as candidates for dark matter using NMR, and the DM Radio Pathfinder Experiment, which aims to search for dark matter in the hidden photon and axion sector using magnetometry and electromagnetic resonance. He also proposed, with Rajendran and others, to detect gravitational waves using atom interferometry.

Together with David Kaplan and Surjeet Rajendran, he proposed a solution to the hierarchy problem with dynamic relaxation in the early universe instead of, as is usually the case, with new physics (such as supersymmetry, extra dimensions) on the electroweak scale of the Standard Model (or the Anthropic Principle). According to Graham's model, the relaxation field that determines the inflation dynamics also determines the Higgs mass, and the value of the relaxation field today is close to one of its many local minima. At the beginning of the universe, however, it had much higher values, with an associated Higgs mass possibly on the Planck scale. In the simplest version, the model of Graham and colleagues includes, in addition to the Standard Model, inflation and a QCD axion that is identified with the relaxation. As soon as the quarks acquire mass via the Higgs field, the axion/relaxion field is conversely frozen by interaction with the quarks. The model was inspired by a similar mechanism that Larry Abbott used in 1984 to explain why the cosmological constant is so small. The simplest version of the model, which identifies the relaxation ion with the axion, has been criticized by others and probably needs to be modified. The axion is already a candidate for dark matter and was originally introduced as a solution to the strong CP problem in the Standard Model. The model of Graham and colleagues also attracted attention because no supersymmetric particles, which until then were considered the most promising explanation of the hierarchy problem, had been discovered at the LHC.

In 2017, he received the New Horizons in Physics Prize with Asimina Arvanitaki and Surjeet Rajendran for developing new experimental tests of physics beyond the Standard Model. In 2014, he received an Early Career Award from the Department of Energy and was a Terman Fellow at Stanford.

== Personal life ==
Graham has 2 children with his wife Lauren Graham, named Keira and Ashley.
