= Xie Chen =

Chinese physicist

- 陈谐
- Education: Tsinghua University; Massachusetts Institute of Technology
- Awards: New Horizons in Physics Prize (2020)
- Scientific career
- Fields: Condensed matter theory Quantum information
- Workplaces: University of California, Berkeley; California Institute of Technology
- Doctoral advisor: Issac Chuang; Xiao-Gang Wen

Xie Chen (Chinese: 陈谐; pinyin: Chén Xié) is a Chinese physicist and a professor of theoretical physics at the California Institute of Technology. Her work covers both the field of condensed matter physics and quantum information, with a focus on many-body quantum mechanical systems with unconventional emergent phenomena. She won the 2020 New Horizons in Physics Prize for "incisive contributions to the understanding of topological states of matter and the relationships between them".

== Early life and education ==
Chen received her bachelor's degree in physics from Tsinghua University in 2006 and her Ph.D. in theoretical physics from Massachusetts Institute of Technology in 2012 under the supervision of Isaac Chuang and Xiao-Gang Wen. From 2012–2014, Chen was a Miller Research Fellow in University of California, Berkeley. In 2014, she joined the California Institute of Technology as an assistant professor, was promoted to associate professor in 2017 and was promoted to professor in 2019. She is currently the Eddleman Professor of Theoretical Physics, a position she started in 2024.

== Research ==
Chen's research centers on novel phases and phase transitions in quantum condensed matter systems. Her major research topics include topological order in strongly correlated systems, dynamics in many-body systems, tensor network representation, fault tolerant quantum computation, speech recognition, quantum simulation, and quantum information application.

== Awards and honors ==
- Simons Investigator (2021)
- New Horizons in Physics Prize (2020)
- Sloan Research Fellowship (2017)
- National Science Foundation Faculty Early Career Award (2017)
- Miller Research Fellowship, UC Berkeley (2012)
- Outstanding Chinese Self-financed Students Abroad (one of nine extraordinary prizewinners, 2012)
- Andrew M. Lockett III Memorial Fund Award for best theoretical physics graduate student at MIT (2011)
- Whiteman Fellowship for graduate study of physics at MIT (2006)
