= Tien-Tien Yu =

American physicist

Chiu-Tien "Tien-Tien" Yu is an American physicist whose research focuses on methods for detecting dark matter and understanding its nature. She is an associate professor of physics at the University of Oregon.

== Education and career ==
After a childhood interest in marine biology, Yu was inspired by a high school astrophysics class to think of the universe itself as being deep and mysterious in the same way as the ocean. She majored in physics at the University of Chicago, graduating in 2007. She completed her Ph.D. in 2013 at the University of Wisconsin–Madison, with the last two years of her doctoral study involving research as a graduate student fellow at Fermilab. Her dissertation, The Top Quark as a Window to Beyond the Standard Model Physics, was supervised by Vernon Barger.

After postdoctoral research at the C. N. Yang Institute for Theoretical Physics of Stony Brook University, and as a theory fellow at CERN in Geneva, Switzerland, she took a faculty position as assistant professor of physics at the University of Oregon (on leave for a year while she finished her work at CERN). In 2022 she was promoted to associate professor.

Her work at the University of Oregon has included cofounding an interdisciplinary student research program in science and comics, with comics studies faculty member Kate Kelp-Stebbins.

== Recognition ==
Yu received a National Science Foundation CAREER Award in 2020, and the Presidential Early Career Award for Scientists and Engineers in 2025.

She was one of the 2021 recipients of the New Horizons in Physics Prize, recognizing her work searching for light dark matter.
