= Abraham Wickelgren =

American lawyer

Fred and Emily Marshall Wulff Centennial Chair in Law at the University of Texas School of Law

Personal details
- Born: May 14, 1969 (age 56) Boston, Massachusetts, U.S.
- Spouse: Kelly Mikelson (m. 1999)
- Children: 2
- Education: Harvard University (BA); Harvard University (JD); Harvard University (Ph.D.)

Abraham Lee Wickelgren is an American economist and legal scholar who is currently the Fred And Emily Marshall Wulff Centennial Chair In Law at the University of Texas School of Law. He was previously the Bernard J. Ward Centennial Professor of Law. He is currently the co-editor of The Journal of Law, Economics, & Organization and was formerly the co-editor-in-chief of the American Law and Economics Review. Wickelgren worked as a visiting professor at Yale Law School from 2012 to 2013 and Duke University School of Law between 2008 and 2009. He also was a staff economist for the Federal Trade Commission in the Bureau of Economics for 5 years between 1999 and 2004.

== Early life ==
Wickelgren was born on May 14, 1969, to Wayne Wickelgren and Barbara Gordon-Lickey. He is the brother of physicist Peter W. Graham and mathematician Kirsten Wickelgren. He also has 1 other sister, 1 half-sister, and 3 step-siblings. In his freshman year of high school, he was class president and in his sophomore year, he was class vice president. He won the Berkeley debate tournament in his junior and senior year. During his senior year, he got to octofinals of the Tournament of Champions in cross examination debate. He graduated from South Eugene High School.

== College ==
Wickelgren attended Harvard University. He was on the policy debate team during his freshman year and got to the finals of novice nationals. He graduated Cum Laude in Applied Mathematics to Economics in 1991. He got a JD and a Ph.D. in economics, also from Harvard. During his last year in law school, he was on the Harvard Law Review.

== Academic Research ==
Wickelgren started doing research as part of his job for the Federal Trade Commission. Then he moved to the University of Texas at Austin to become a lecturer in the economics department but still made time for research. In 2006, Wickelgren moved to the Northwestern University school of law to become an assistant professor for 3 years. In 2018, he wrote an article for Brookings about a solution to gun control. He has also written several book chapters on contracts, antitrust enforcement and affirmative action among other topics. He also frequently writes papers that have been published in peer-reviewed journals with Ezra Friedman and Ronen Avraham.

At the University of Texas, he teaches a seminar in Law & Economics every semester, in the fall he teaches a course on antitrust and in the spring he teaches a course on Law and Economics.

== Consulting and Testifying ==
Wickelgren spoke at a committee hearing in the Texas legislature in 2021 against the requirement that electric vehicles have to be sold through a dealership. He also worked on E-books litigation as a consulting expert for the State of Texas between 2010 and 2013 and also was an expert in the settlement between June 2012 and 2013.

Wickelgren also comments to news outlets on issues of antitrust. In 2024, he gave an interview to Vox on the antitrust issues associated with the potential sale of TikTok to any major tech firms. In 2017, he was interviewed by UT News on the subject of if Facebook and Google are monopolies.

== Personal life ==
Wickelgren lives in Austin with his two children. He is married to Kelly S. Mikelson.
