= Breakthrough Prize in Fundamental Physics =

International science award since 2012

Breakthrough Prize in Fundamental Physics Special Breakthrough Prize in Fundamental Physics
- Awarded for: Accomplishments in fundamental physics broadly defined
- Presented by: Breakthrough Prize Board
- Reward: US$3 million
- First award: 2012
- Website: Official Website

The Breakthrough Prize in Fundamental Physics is one of the Breakthrough Prizes, awarded by the Breakthrough Prize Board. Initially named Fundamental Physics Prize, it was launched in July 2012, and is supported by the foundation co-founded by Russia-born Israeli entrepreneur, venture capitalist and physicist Yuri Milner. The prize is awarded to physicists from theoretical, mathematical, or experimental physics that have made transformative contributions to fundamental physics, and specifically for recent advances.

Worth US$3 million, the prize is the most lucrative physics prize in the world and is more than twice the amount given to the Nobel Prize awardees.

Unlike the annual Breakthrough Prize in Fundamental Physics, the Special Breakthrough Prize may be awarded at any time for outstanding achievements, while the prize money is still US$3 million.

Physics Frontiers Prize has only been awarded for two years. Laureates are automatically nominated for next year's Breakthrough Prize in Fundamental Physics. If they are not awarded the prize the next year, they will each receive US$300,000 and be automatically nominated for the Breakthrough Prize in Fundamental Physics in the next five years.

== Laureates ==
This is a listing of the laureates by year (including Special Prize winners):

Year of award	Fundamental Physics Prize laureates	Institutional affiliation when prize awarded	Awarded for
2012	Nima Arkani-Hamed	Institute for Advanced Study, Princeton	Original approaches to outstanding problems in particle physics
2012	Alan Guth	Massachusetts Institute of Technology, Cambridge	Invention of inflationary cosmology, and for contributions to the theory for the generation of cosmological density fluctuations arising from quantum fluctuations
2012	Alexei Kitaev	California Institute of Technology, Pasadena, CA Currently at KITP and UCSB, Santa Barbara	For robust quantum memories and fault-tolerant quantum computation using topological quantum phases with anyons and unpaired Majorana modes; topological quantum computing.
2012	Maxim Kontsevich	Institut des Hautes Études Scientifiques, Bures-sur-Yvette	Numerous contributions including development of homological mirror symmetry, and the study of wall-crossing phenomena.
2012	Andrei Linde	Stanford University, Stanford	For development of inflationary cosmology, including the theory of new inflation, eternal chaotic inflation and the theory of inflationary multiverse, and for contributing to the development of vacuum stabilization mechanisms in string theory.
2012	Juan Maldacena	Institute for Advanced Study, Princeton	Contributions to gauge/gravity duality, relating gravitational physics in a spacetime and quantum field theory on the boundary of the spacetime
2012	Nathan Seiberg	Institute for Advanced Study, Princeton	Contributions to our understanding of quantum field theory and string theory.
2012	Ashoke Sen	Harish-Chandra Research Institute, Allahabad	Opening the path to the realization that all string theories are different limits of the same underlying theory.
2012	Edward Witten	Institute for Advanced Study, Princeton	For applications of topology to physics, non-perturbative duality symmetries, models of particle physics derived from string theory, dark matter detection, and the twistor-string approach to particle scattering amplitudes, as well as numerous applications of quantum field theory to mathematics.
2013 (special)	Stephen Hawking		For his discovery of Hawking radiation from black holes, and his deep contributions to quantum gravity and quantum aspects of the early universe.
2013 (special)	Peter Jenni, Fabiola Gianotti (ATLAS), Michel Della Negra, Tejinder Singh Virdee, Guido Tonelli, Joe Incandela (CMS) and Lyn Evans (LHC)		For their leadership role in the scientific endeavour that led to the discovery of the new Higgs boson by the ATLAS and CMS collaborations at CERN's Large Hadron Collider.
2013	Alexander Polyakov	Princeton University, Princeton	For his many discoveries in field theory and string theory including the conformal bootstrap, magnetic monopoles, instantons, confinement/de-confinement, the quantization of strings in non-critical dimensions, gauge/string duality and many others. His ideas have dominated the scene in these fields during the past decades.
2014	Michael Green	California Institute of Technology	For opening new perspectives on quantum gravity and the unification of forces.
2014	John Henry Schwarz	University of Cambridge	For opening new perspectives on quantum gravity and the unification of forces.
2015	Saul Perlmutter and members of the Supernova Cosmology Project; Brian P. Schmidt, Adam Riess and members of the High-Z Supernova Team.	University of California, Berkeley and Lawrence Berkeley National Laboratory; Australian National University;Johns Hopkins University and Space Telescope Science Institute	For the most unexpected discovery that the expansion of the universe is accelerating, rather than slowing as had been long assumed.
2016	Yifang Wang; Kam-Biu Luk and the Daya Bay Team	Chinese Academy of Sciences, University of California, Berkeley	For the fundamental discovery and exploration of neutrino oscillations, revealing a new frontier beyond, and possibly far beyond, the standard model of particle physics.
2016	Atsuto Suzuki and the KamLAND Team	Iwate Prefectural University, Japan	For the fundamental discovery and exploration of neutrino oscillations, revealing a new frontier beyond, and possibly far beyond, the standard model of particle physics.
2016	Kōichirō Nishikawa and the K2K / T2K Team	High Energy Accelerator Research Organization, Japan	For the fundamental discovery and exploration of neutrino oscillations, revealing a new frontier beyond, and possibly far beyond, the standard model of particle physics.
2016	Arthur B. McDonald and the Sudbury Neutrino Observatory Team	Queen's University, Canada	For the fundamental discovery and exploration of neutrino oscillations, revealing a new frontier beyond, and possibly far beyond, the standard model of particle physics.
2016	Takaaki Kajita; Yōichirō Suzuki and the Super-Kamiokande Team	Kavli Institute for the Physics and Mathematics of the Universe, University of Tokyo, Japan	For the fundamental discovery and exploration of neutrino oscillations, revealing a new frontier beyond, and possibly far beyond, the standard model of particle physics.
2016 (special)	Ronald Drever	California Institute of Technology	For the observation of gravitational waves, opening new horizons in astronomy and physics.
2016 (special)	Kip Thorne	California Institute of Technology	For the observation of gravitational waves, opening new horizons in astronomy and physics.
2016 (special)	Rainer Weiss	Massachusetts Institute of Technology	For the observation of gravitational waves, opening new horizons in astronomy and physics.
2016 (special)	LIGO contributors ( authors of the paper Observation of Gravitational Waves from a Binary Black Hole Merger, Physical Review Letters, 11 February 2016) and other LIGO contributors	LIGO	For the observation of gravitational waves, opening new horizons in astronomy and physics.
2017	Joseph Polchinski	University of California, Santa Barbara	For transformative advances in quantum field theory, string theory, and quantum gravity.
2017	Andrew Strominger	Harvard University	For transformative advances in quantum field theory, string theory, and quantum gravity.
2017	Cumrun Vafa	Harvard University	For transformative advances in quantum field theory, string theory, and quantum gravity.
2018	Charles L. Bennett	Johns Hopkins University	For detailed maps of the early universe that greatly improved our knowledge of the evolution of the cosmos and the fluctuations that seeded the formation of galaxies.
2018	Gary Hinshaw	University of British Columbia	For detailed maps of the early universe that greatly improved our knowledge of the evolution of the cosmos and the fluctuations that seeded the formation of galaxies.
2018	Norman Jarosik	Princeton University	For detailed maps of the early universe that greatly improved our knowledge of the evolution of the cosmos and the fluctuations that seeded the formation of galaxies.
2018	Lyman Page Jr.	Princeton University	For detailed maps of the early universe that greatly improved our knowledge of the evolution of the cosmos and the fluctuations that seeded the formation of galaxies.
2018	David N. Spergel	Princeton University	For detailed maps of the early universe that greatly improved our knowledge of the evolution of the cosmos and the fluctuations that seeded the formation of galaxies.
2018	WMAP Science Team (Chris Barnes, Olivier Doré, Joanna Dunkley, Ben Gold, Michael Greason, Mark Halpern, Robert Hill, Al Kogut, Eiichiro Komatsu, David Larson, Michele Limon, Stephan Meyer, Michael Nolta, Nils Odegard, Hiranya Peiris, Chris Hirata, Kendrick Smith, Greg Tucker, Licia Verde, Janet Weiland, Ed Wollack, E. Wollack, Ned Wright)	Princeton University	For detailed maps of the early universe that greatly improved our knowledge of the evolution of the cosmos and the fluctuations that seeded the formation of galaxies.
2018 (special)	Jocelyn Bell Burnell	University of Oxford and University of Dundee	For fundamental contributions to the discovery of pulsars, and a lifetime of inspiring leadership in the scientific community.
2019	Charles Kane	University of Pennsylvania	For new ideas about topology and symmetry in physics, leading to the prediction of a new class of materials that conduct electricity only on their surface.
2019	Eugene Mele	University of Pennsylvania	For new ideas about topology and symmetry in physics, leading to the prediction of a new class of materials that conduct electricity only on their surface.
2019 (special)	Sergio Ferrara	CERN, UCLA	For the invention of supergravity, in which quantum variables are part of the description of the geometry of spacetime.
2019 (special)	Daniel Z. Freedman	Massachusetts Institute of Technology and Stanford University	For the invention of supergravity, in which quantum variables are part of the description of the geometry of spacetime.
2019 (special)	Peter van Nieuwenhuizen	Stony Brook University	For the invention of supergravity, in which quantum variables are part of the description of the geometry of spacetime.
2020	The Event Horizon Telescope Collaboration	The EHT Collaboration consists of 13 stakeholder institutes: the Academia Sinica Institute of Astronomy and Astrophysics; the University of Arizona; the University of Chicago; the East Asian Observatory; Goethe University Frankfurt; Smithsonian Astrophysical Observatory (part of the Center for Astrophysics); Institut de radioastronomie millimétrique (IRAM, itself a collaboration between the French CNRS, the German Max Planck Society, and the Spanish Instituto Geográfico Nacional), Large Millimeter Telescope Alfonso Serrano; Max Planck Institute for Radio Astronomy; MIT Haystack Observatory; National Astronomical Observatory of Japan; Perimeter Institute for Theoretical Physics; Radboud University	For the first image of a supermassive black hole, taken by means of an Earth-sized alliance of telescopes.
2021	Eric Adelberger	University of Washington	For precision fundamental measurements that test our understanding of gravity, probe the nature of dark energy, and establish limits on couplings to dark matter.
2021	Jens H. Gundlach	University of Washington	For precision fundamental measurements that test our understanding of gravity, probe the nature of dark energy, and establish limits on couplings to dark matter.
2021	Blayne Heckel	University of Washington	For precision fundamental measurements that test our understanding of gravity, probe the nature of dark energy, and establish limits on couplings to dark matter.
2021 (special)	Steven Weinberg	University of Texas at Austin	For his continuous leadership in fundamental physics, with broad impact across particle physics, gravity and cosmology, and for communicating science to a wider audience.
2022	Hidetoshi Katori	University of Tokyo and RIKEN	For outstanding contributions to the invention and development of the optical lattice clock, which enables precision tests of the fundamental laws of nature.
2022	Jun Ye	National Institute of Standards and Technology and University of Colorado	For outstanding contributions to the invention and development of the optical lattice clock, which enables precision tests of the fundamental laws of nature.
2023	Charles H. Bennett	IBM Thomas J. Watson Research Center	For foundational work in the field of quantum information.
2023	Gilles Brassard	Université de Montréal	For foundational work in the field of quantum information.
2023	David Deutsch	Oxford University	For foundational work in the field of quantum information.
2023	Peter W. Shor	Massachusetts Institute of Technology	For foundational work in the field of quantum information.
2024	John Cardy	All Souls College, University of Oxford	For profound contributions to statistical physics and quantum field theory, with diverse and far-reaching applications in different branches of physics and mathematics.
2024	Alexander Zamolodchikov	Stony Brook University	For profound contributions to statistical physics and quantum field theory, with diverse and far-reaching applications in different branches of physics and mathematics.
2025	ATLAS collaboration	CERN	For detailed measurements of Higgs boson properties confirming the symmetry-breaking mechanism of mass generation, the discovery of new strongly interacting particles, the study of rare processes and matter-antimatter asymmetry, and the exploration of nature at the shortest distances and most extreme conditions at CERN’s Large Hadron Collider.
2025	CMS collaboration	CERN	For detailed measurements of Higgs boson properties confirming the symmetry-breaking mechanism of mass generation, the discovery of new strongly interacting particles, the study of rare processes and matter-antimatter asymmetry, and the exploration of nature at the shortest distances and most extreme conditions at CERN’s Large Hadron Collider.
2025	ALICE collaboration	CERN	For detailed measurements of Higgs boson properties confirming the symmetry-breaking mechanism of mass generation, the discovery of new strongly interacting particles, the study of rare processes and matter-antimatter asymmetry, and the exploration of nature at the shortest distances and most extreme conditions at CERN’s Large Hadron Collider.
2025	LHCb collaboration	CERN	For detailed measurements of Higgs boson properties confirming the symmetry-breaking mechanism of mass generation, the discovery of new strongly interacting particles, the study of rare processes and matter-antimatter asymmetry, and the exploration of nature at the shortest distances and most extreme conditions at CERN’s Large Hadron Collider.
2025 (special)	Gerard 't Hooft	Utrecht University	For fundamental insights into gauge theory and the standard model.
2026	Muon g-2 collaboration	Composed of: CERN; Brookhaven National Laboratory; Fermilab	For multi-decade, groundbreaking contributions to the measurement of the muon's anomalous magnetic moment, pushing the boundaries of experimental precision and igniting a new era in the quest for physics beyond the Standard Model.
2026 (special)	David Gross	University of California, Santa Barbara Kavli Institute for Theoretical Physics	For a lifetime of groundbreaking contributions to theoretical physics, from the strong force to string theory, and for tireless advocacy for basic science worldwide

== New Horizons in Physics Prize ==
The New Horizons in Physics Prize, awarded to promising junior researchers, carries an award of $100,000.

Year of award	New Horizons in Physics Prize laureates	Institutional affiliation when prize awarded	Awarded for
2013	Niklas Beisert	ETH Zurich	Development of powerful exact methods to describe a quantum gauge theory and its associated string theory
2013	Davide Gaiotto	Perimeter Institute for Theoretical Physics	Far-reaching new insights about duality, gauge theory, and geometry, and specially for his work linking theories in different dimensions in most unexpected ways
2013	Zohar Komargodski	Weizmann Institute of Science	Dynamics of four-dimensional field theories and in particular his proof (with Schwimmer) of the “a-theorem”, which has solved a long-standing problem
2014	Freddy Cachazo	Perimeter Institute for Theoretical Physics	Uncovering numerous structures underlying scattering amplitudes in gauge theories and gravity
2014	Shiraz Minwalla	Tata Institute of Fundamental Research	Pioneering contributions to the study of string theory and quantum field theory; and in particular his work on the connection between the equations of fluid dynamics and Albert Einstein's equations of general relativity
2014	Slava Rychkov	Pierre-and-Marie-Curie University	Developing new techniques in conformal field theory, reviving the conformal bootstrap program for constraining the spectrum of operators and the structure constants in 3D and 4D CFT's
2015	Sean Hartnoll	Stanford University	For applying holographic methods to obtain remarkable new insights into strongly interacting quantum matter.
2015	Philip C. Schuster and Natalia Toro	Perimeter Institute	For pioneering the “simplified models” framework for new physics searches at the Large Hadron Collider, as well as spearheading new experimental searches for dark sectors using high-intensity electron beams.
2015	Horacio Casini	CONICET	For fundamental ideas about entropy in quantum field theory and quantum gravity.
2015	Marina Huerta	Universidad Nacional de Cuyo	For fundamental ideas about entropy in quantum field theory and quantum gravity.
2015	Shinsei Ryu	University of Illinois at Urbana-Champaign	For fundamental ideas about entropy in quantum field theory and quantum gravity.
2015	Tadashi Takayanagi	Kyoto University	For fundamental ideas about entropy in quantum field theory and quantum gravity.
2016	B. Andrei Bernevig	Princeton University	For outstanding contributions to condensed matter physics, especially involving the use of topology to understand new states of matter.
2016	Xiao-Liang Qi	Stanford University	For outstanding contributions to condensed matter physics, especially involving the use of topology to understand new states of matter.
2016	Raphael Flauger	The University of Texas at Austin	For outstanding contributions to theoretical cosmology.
2016	Leonardo Senatore	Stanford University	For outstanding contributions to theoretical cosmology.
2016	Liang Fu	Massachusetts Institute of Technology	For outstanding contributions to condensed matter physics, especially involving the use of topology to understand new states of matter.
2016	Yuji Tachikawa	University of Tokyo	For penetrating and incisive studies of supersymmetric quantum field theories.
2017	Frans Pretorius	Princeton University	For creating the first computer code capable of simulating the inspiral and merger of binary black holes, thereby laying crucial foundations for interpreting the recent observations of gravitational waves; and for opening new directions in numerical relativity.
2017	Simone Giombi	Princeton University	For imaginative joint work on higher spin gravity and its holographic connection to a new soluble field theory.
2017	Xi Yin	Harvard University	For imaginative joint work on higher spin gravity and its holographic connection to a new soluble field theory.
2017	Asimina Arvanitaki	Perimeter Institute	For pioneering a wide range of new experimental probes of fundamental physics.
2017	Peter W. Graham	Stanford University	For pioneering a wide range of new experimental probes of fundamental physics.
2017	Surjeet Rajendran	University of California, Berkeley	For pioneering a wide range of new experimental probes of fundamental physics.
2018	Christopher Hirata	Ohio State University	For fundamental contributions to understanding the physics of early galaxy formation and to sharpening and applying the most powerful tools of precision cosmology
2018	Douglas Stanford	Institute for Advanced Study and Stanford University	For profound new insights on quantum chaos and its relation to gravity.
2018	Andrea Young	University of California, Santa Barbara	For the co-invention of van der Waals heterostructures, and for the new quantum Hall phases that he discovered with them.
2019	Rana Adhikari	California Institute of Technology	For research on present and future ground-based detectors of gravitational waves.
2019	Lisa Barsotti and Matthew Evans	Massachusetts Institute of Technology	For research on present and future ground-based detectors of gravitational waves.
2019	Daniel Harlow	Massachusetts Institute of Technology	For fundamental insights about quantum information, quantum field theory, and gravity.
2019	Daniel L. Jafferis	Harvard University	For fundamental insights about quantum information, quantum field theory, and gravity.
2019	Aron Wall	Stanford University	For fundamental insights about quantum information, quantum field theory, and gravity.
2019	Brian Metzger	Columbia University	For pioneering predictions of the electromagnetic signal from a neutron star merger, and for leadership in the emerging field of multi-messenger astronomy.
2020	Xie Chen	California Institute of Technology	For incisive contributions to the understanding of topological states of matter and the relationships between them.
2020	Lukasz Fidkowski	University of Washington	For incisive contributions to the understanding of topological states of matter and the relationships between them.
2020	Michael Levin	University of Chicago	For incisive contributions to the understanding of topological states of matter and the relationships between them.
2020	Max A. Metlitski	Massachusetts Institute of Technology	For incisive contributions to the understanding of topological states of matter and the relationships between them.
2020	Jo Dunkley	Princeton University	For the development of novel techniques to extract fundamental physics from astronomical data.
2020	Samaya Nissanke	University of Amsterdam	For the development of novel techniques to extract fundamental physics from astronomical data.
2020	Kendrick Smith	Perimeter Institute	For the development of novel techniques to extract fundamental physics from astronomical data.
2020	Simon Caron-Huot	McGill University	For profound contributions to the understanding of quantum field theory.
2020	Pedro Vieira	Perimeter Institute and ICTP-SAIFR	For profound contributions to the understanding of quantum field theory.
2021	Tracy Slatyer	Massachusetts Institute of Technology	For major contributions to particle astrophysics, from models of dark matter to the discovery of the “Fermi Bubbles.”
2021	Rouven Essig	Stony Brook University	For advances in the detection of sub-GeV dark matter especially in regards to the SENSEI experiment.
2021	Javier Tiffenberg	Fermilab	For advances in the detection of sub-GeV dark matter especially in regards to the SENSEI experiment.
2021	Tomer Volansky	Tel Aviv University	For advances in the detection of sub-GeV dark matter especially in regards to the SENSEI experiment.
2021	Tien-Tien Yu	University of Oregon	For advances in the detection of sub-GeV dark matter especially in regards to the SENSEI experiment.
2021	Ahmed Almheiri	Institute for Advanced Study	For calculating the quantum information content of a black hole and its radiation.
2021	Netta Engelhardt	Massachusetts Institute of Technology	For calculating the quantum information content of a black hole and its radiation.
2021	Henry Maxfield	University of California, Santa Barbara	For calculating the quantum information content of a black hole and its radiation.
2021	Geoff Penington	University of California, Berkeley	For calculating the quantum information content of a black hole and its radiation.
2022	Suchitra Sebastian	University of Cambridge	For high precision electronic and magnetic measurements that have profoundly changed our understanding of high temperature superconductors and unconventional insulators.
2022	Alessandra Corsi	Texas Tech University	For leadership in laying foundations for electromagnetic observations of sources of gravitational waves, and leadership in extracting rich information from the first observed collision of two neutron stars.
2022	Gregg Hallinan	California Institute of Technology	For leadership in laying foundations for electromagnetic observations of sources of gravitational waves, and leadership in extracting rich information from the first observed collision of two neutron stars.
2022	Mansi Manoj Kasliwal	California Institute of Technology	For leadership in laying foundations for electromagnetic observations of sources of gravitational waves, and leadership in extracting rich information from the first observed collision of two neutron stars.
2022	Raffaella Margutti	University of California, Berkeley	For leadership in laying foundations for electromagnetic observations of sources of gravitational waves, and leadership in extracting rich information from the first observed collision of two neutron stars.
2022	Dominic Else	Harvard University	For pioneering theoretical work formulating novel phases of non-equilibrium quantum matter, including time crystals.
2022	Vedika Khemani	Stanford University	For pioneering theoretical work formulating novel phases of non-equilibrium quantum matter, including time crystals.
2022	Haruki Watanabe	University of Tokyo	For pioneering theoretical work formulating novel phases of non-equilibrium quantum matter, including time crystals.
2022	Norman Y. Yao	University of California, Berkeley	For pioneering theoretical work formulating novel phases of non-equilibrium quantum matter, including time crystals.
2023	David Simmons-Duffin	California Institute of Technology	For the development of analytical and numerical techniques to study conformal field theories, including the ones describing the liquid vapor critical point and the superfluid phase transition.
2023	Anna Grassellino	Fermilab	For the discovery of major performance enhancements to niobium superconducting radio-frequency cavities, with applications ranging from accelerator physics to quantum devices.
2023	Hannes Bernien	University of Chicago	For the development of optical tweezer arrays to realize control of individual atoms for applications in quantum information science, metrology, and molecular physics.
2023	Manuel Endres	California Institute of Technology	For the development of optical tweezer arrays to realize control of individual atoms for applications in quantum information science, metrology, and molecular physics.
2023	Adam M. Kaufman	JILA	For the development of optical tweezer arrays to realize control of individual atoms for applications in quantum information science, metrology, and molecular physics.
2023	Kang-Kuen Ni	Harvard University	For the development of optical tweezer arrays to realize control of individual atoms for applications in quantum information science, metrology, and molecular physics.
2023	Hannes Pichler	University of Innsbruck; Austrian Academy of Sciences	For the development of optical tweezer arrays to realize control of individual atoms for applications in quantum information science, metrology, and molecular physics.
2023	Jeff Thompson	Princeton University	For the development of optical tweezer arrays to realize control of individual atoms for applications in quantum information science, metrology, and molecular physics.
2024	Michael Johnson	Harvard–Smithsonian Center for Astrophysics	For elucidating the sub-structure and universal characteristics of black hole photon rings, and their proposed detection by next-generation interferometric experiments.
2024	Alexandru Lupsasca	Vanderbilt University	For elucidating the sub-structure and universal characteristics of black hole photon rings, and their proposed detection by next-generation interferometric experiments.
2024	Mikhail Ivanov	Massachusetts Institute of Technology	For contributions to our understanding of the large-scale structure of the universe and the development of new tools to extract fundamental physics from galaxy surveys.
2024	Oliver Philcox	Columbia University and Simons Foundation	For contributions to our understanding of the large-scale structure of the universe and the development of new tools to extract fundamental physics from galaxy surveys.
2024	Marko Simonović	University of Florence	For contributions to our understanding of the large-scale structure of the universe and the development of new tools to extract fundamental physics from galaxy surveys.
2024	Laura M. Pérez	University of Chile	For the prediction, discovery, and modeling of dust traps in young circumstellar disks, solving a long-standing problem in planet formation.
2024	Paola Pinilla	University College London	For the prediction, discovery, and modeling of dust traps in young circumstellar disks, solving a long-standing problem in planet formation.
2024	Nienke van der Marel	Leiden Observatory	For the prediction, discovery, and modeling of dust traps in young circumstellar disks, solving a long-standing problem in planet formation.
2024	Til Birnstiel	LMU Munich	For the prediction, discovery, and modeling of dust traps in young circumstellar disks, solving a long-standing problem in planet formation.
2025	Waseem Bakr	Princeton University	For the realization of quantum gas microscopes for atoms and molecules, providing a microscopic view on correlations and transport in strongly interacting quantum systems.
2025	Jeongwan Haah	Stanford University	For the discovery of Haah's code, in which fractal conservation laws emerge, and other models bringing discrete mathematical structures to physics.
2025	Sebastiaan Haffert	Leiden Observatory, Leiden University & Steward Observatory, University of Arizona	For demonstrating new extreme adaptive optics techniques that will allow the direct detection of the smallest exoplanets.
2025	Rebecca Jensen-Clem	University of California, Santa Cruz	For demonstrating new extreme adaptive optics techniques that will allow the direct detection of the smallest exoplanets.
2025	Maaike van Kooten	National Research Council Canada	For demonstrating new extreme adaptive optics techniques that will allow the direct detection of the smallest exoplanets.
2026	Benjamin R. Safdi	University of California, Berkeley	For proposing new ways to seek axion-like particles with laboratory experiments and astronomical observations.
2026	Clay Córdova	University of Chicago	For generalizing the notion of symmetry in various ways, and for exploring the consequences of these generalized symmetries, in quantum field theory, particle physics, condensed matter physics, string theory, and quantum information theory.
2026	Thomas Dumitrescu	University of California, Los Angeles	For generalizing the notion of symmetry in various ways, and for exploring the consequences of these generalized symmetries, in quantum field theory, particle physics, condensed matter physics, string theory, and quantum information theory.
2026	Shu-Heng Shao	Massachusetts Institute of Technology	For generalizing the notion of symmetry in various ways, and for exploring the consequences of these generalized symmetries, in quantum field theory, particle physics, condensed matter physics, string theory, and quantum information theory.
2026	Yifan Wang	New York University	For generalizing the notion of symmetry in various ways, and for exploring the consequences of these generalized symmetries, in quantum field theory, particle physics, condensed matter physics, string theory, and quantum information theory.
2026	Dillon Brout	Boston University	For advances in cosmic microwave background and supernovae cosmology.
2026	J. Colin Hill	Columbia University	For advances in cosmic microwave background and supernovae cosmology.
2026	Mathew Madhavacheril	University of Pennsylvania	For advances in cosmic microwave background and supernovae cosmology.
2026	Maria Vincenzi	University of Oxford	For advances in cosmic microwave background and supernovae cosmology.
2026	Daniel Scolnic	Duke University	For advances in cosmic microwave background and supernovae cosmology.
2026	W. L. Kimmy Wu	California Institute of Technology	For advances in cosmic microwave background and supernovae cosmology.

== Vera Rubin New Frontiers Prize ==
In 2026, the Vera Rubin New Frontier Prize was inaugurated in honor of Vera Rubin. The prize recognizes female physicists within two years of their PhDs who have already made important contributions to science.

Year of award	New Horizons in Physics Prize laureates	Institutional affiliation when prize awarded	Awarded for
2026	Carolina Figueiredo	Princeton University	For contributions to the geometric structure of scattering amplitudes, revealing hidden relations among quantum field theories.

== Trophy ==
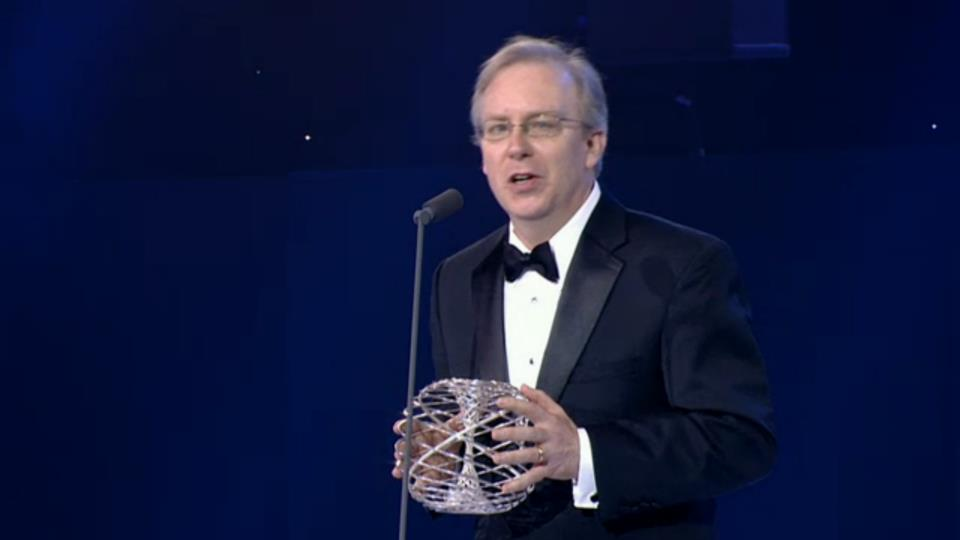
Charles L. Kane holding the Fundamental Physics Prize trophy

The Fundamental Physics Prize trophy, a work of art created by Danish-Icelandic artist Olafur Eliasson, is a silver sphere with a coiled vortex inside. The form is a toroid, or doughnut shape, resulting from two sets of intertwining three-dimensional spirals. Found in nature, these spirals are seen in animal horns, nautilus shells, whirlpools, and even galaxies and black holes.

== Ceremony ==
The name of the 2013 prize winner was unveiled at the culmination of a ceremony which took place on the evening of March 20, 2013 at the Geneva International Conference Centre. The ceremony was hosted by Hollywood actor and science enthusiast Morgan Freeman. The evening honored the 2013 laureates − 16 outstanding scientists including Stephen Hawking and CERN scientists who led the decades-long effort to discover the Higgs-like particle at the Large Hadron Collider. Sarah Brightman and Russian pianist Denis Matsuev performed for the guests of the ceremony.

== Criticism ==
Some have expressed reservations about such new science mega-prizes.

What's not to like? Quite a lot, according to a handful of scientists... You cannot buy class, as the old saying goes, and these upstart entrepreneurs cannot buy their prizes the prestige of the Nobels. The new awards are an exercise in self-promotion for those behind them, say scientists. They could distort the meritocracy of peer-review-led research. They could cement the status quo of peer-reviewed research. They do not fund peer-reviewed research. They perpetuate the myth of the lone genius.... As much as some scientists may grumble about the new awards, the financial doping that they bring to research and the wisdom of the goals behind them, two things seem clear. First, most researchers would accept such a prize if they were offered one. Second, it is surely a good thing that the money and attention come to science rather than go elsewhere. It is fair to criticize and question the mechanism—that is the culture of research, after all—but it is the prize-givers' money to do with as they please. It is wise to accept such gifts with gratitude and grace.

== See also ==
- Breakthrough Prize in Life Sciences
- Breakthrough Prize in Mathematics
- List of physics awards
