= Ryu–Takayanagi conjecture =

Theoretical Physics

In 2006, Shinsei Ryu and Tadashi Takayanagi proposed a conjecture within holography (an approach to quantum gravity) that posits a quantitative relationship between the entanglement entropy of a conformal field theory and the geometry of an associated anti-de Sitter spacetime. The formula characterizes "holographic screens" in the bulk; that is, it specifies which regions of the bulk geometry are "responsible to particular information in the dual CFT".

The authors were awarded the 2015 Breakthrough Prize in Fundamental Physics for "fundamental ideas about entropy in quantum field theory and quantum gravity", and awarded the 2024 Dirac Medal of the ICTP for "their insights on quantum entropy in quantum gravity and quantum field theories". The formula was generalized to a covariant form in 2007, and to mixed states in 2019.

== Motivation ==
The thermodynamics of black holes suggests certain relationships between the entropy of black holes and their geometry. Specifically, the Bekenstein–Hawking area formula conjectures that the entropy of a black hole is proportional to its surface area:

$$S_\text{BH} = \frac{k_\text{B} A}{4\ell_\text{P}^2}$$

The Bekenstein–Hawking entropy $S_\text{BH}$ is a measure of the information lost to external observers due to the presence of the horizon. The horizon of the black hole acts as a "screen" distinguishing one region of the spacetime (in this case the exterior of the black hole) that is not affected by another region (in this case the interior). The Bekenstein–Hawking area law states that the area of this surface is proportional to the entropy of the information lost behind it.

The Bekenstein–Hawking entropy is a statement about the gravitational entropy of a system; however, there is another type of entropy that is important in quantum information theory, namely the entanglement (or von Neumann) entropy. This form of entropy provides a measure of how far from a pure state a given quantum state is, or, equivalently, how entangled it is. The entanglement entropy is a useful concept in many areas, such as in condensed matter physics and quantum many-body systems. Given its use, and its suggestive similarity to the Bekenstein–Hawking entropy, it is desirable to have a holographic description of entanglement entropy in terms of gravity.

== Holographic preliminaries ==
The holographic principle states that gravitational theories in a given dimension are dual to a gauge theory in one lower dimension. The AdS/CFT correspondence is one example of such duality. Here, the field theory is defined on a fixed background and is equivalent to a quantum gravitational theory whose different states each correspond to a possible spacetime geometry. The conformal field theory is often viewed as living on the boundary of the higher dimensional space whose gravitational theory it defines. The result of such a duality is a dictionary between the two equivalent descriptions. For example, in a CFT defined on $d$ dimensional Minkowski space the vacuum state corresponds to pure AdS space, whereas the thermal state corresponds to a planar black hole. Important for the present discussion is that the thermal state of a CFT defined on the $d$ dimensional sphere corresponds to the $d+1$ dimensional Schwarzschild black hole in AdS space.

The Bekenstein–Hawking area law, while claiming that the area of the black hole horizon is proportional to the black hole's entropy, fails to provide a sufficient microscopic description of how this entropy arises. The holographic principle provides such a description by relating the black hole system to a quantum system which does admit such a microscopic description. In this case, the CFT has discrete eigenstates and the thermal state is the canonical ensemble of these states. The entropy of this ensemble can be calculated through normal means, and yields the same result as predicted by the area law. This turns out to be a special case of the Ryu–Takayanagi conjecture.

== Conjecture ==
Consider a spatial slice $\Sigma$ of an AdS space time on whose boundary we define the dual CFT. The Ryu–Takayanagi formula states:

| $S_A = \frac{\text{Area of } \gamma_A}{4G}$ | 1 |

where $S_A$ is the entanglement entropy of the CFT in some spatial sub-region $A \subset \partial \Sigma$ with its complement $B$, and $\gamma_A$ is the Ryu–Takayanagi surface in the bulk. This surface must satisfy three properties:

1. $\gamma_A$ has the same boundary as $A$.
2. $\gamma_A$ is homologous to A.
3. $\gamma_A$ extremizes the area. If there are multiple extremal surfaces, $\gamma_A$ is the one with the least area.

Because of property (3), this surface is typically called the minimal surface when the context is clear. Furthermore, property (1) ensures that the formula preserves certain features of entanglement entropy, such as $S_A = S_B$ and $S_{A_1 + A_2} \geq S_{A_1 \cup A_2}$. The conjecture provides an explicit geometric interpretation of the entanglement entropy of the boundary CFT, namely as the area of a surface in the bulk.

== Example ==
In their original paper, Ryu and Takayanagi show this result explicitly for an example in $\text{AdS}_3 / \text{CFT}_2$ where an expression for the entanglement entropy is already known. For an $\text{AdS}_3$ space of radius $R$, the dual CFT has a central charge given by

| $c = \frac{3R}{2G}$ | 2 |

Furthermore, $\text{AdS}_3$ has the metric

$ds^2 = R^2(-\cosh{\rho^2 dt^2} + d\rho^2 + \sinh{\rho^2 d\theta^2})$

in $(t, \rho, \theta)$ (essentially a stack of hyperbolic disks). Since this metric diverges at $\rho \to \infty$, $\rho$ is restricted to $\rho \leq \rho_0$. This act of imposing a maximum $\rho$ is analogous to the corresponding CFT having a UV cutoff. If $L$ is the length of the CFT system, in this case the circumference of the cylinder calculated with the appropriate metric, and $a$ is the lattice spacing, we have

$e^{\rho_0} \sim L/a$.

In this case, the boundary CFT lives at coordinates $(t, \rho_0, \theta) = (t, \theta)$. Consider a fixed $t$ slice and take the subregion A of the boundary to be $\theta \in [0, 2\pi l / L]$ where $l$ is the length of $A$. The minimal surface is easy to identify in this case, as it is just the geodesic through the bulk that connects $\theta = 0$ and $\theta = 2 \pi l/L$. Remembering the lattice cutoff, the length of the geodesic can be calculated as

| $\cosh{(L_{\gamma_A} / R)} = 1 + 2\sinh^2 \rho_0 \sin^2 \frac{\pi l}{L}$ | 3 |

If it is assumed that $e^{\rho_0} \gg 1$, then using the Ryu–Takayanagi formula to compute the entanglement entropy. Plugging in the length of the minimal surface calculated in (3) and recalling the central charge (2), the entanglement entropy is given by

| $S_A = \frac{R}{4G}\log{(e^{2\rho_0} \sin^2 \frac{\pi l}{L})} =\frac{c}{3} \log{(e^{\rho_0} \sin{\frac{\pi l}{L}} )}$ | 4 |

This agrees with the result calculated by usual means.

== Holographic TEE and Chern–Simons duality ==
A significant generalization of the Ryu–Takayanagi formula is required to describe boundary theories that exhibit topological order. Such theories are characterized by a pattern of long-range quantum entanglement, which is quantified by a constant, universal term in the entanglement entropy known as the topological entanglement entropy (TEE), denoted by γ. For a two-dimensional boundary theory, the entanglement entropy of a region A with boundary length L takes the form:

$S(A) = \alpha L - \gamma$

where α is a non-universal, UV-dependent coefficient. The original Ryu–Takayanagi formula, being purely geometric, naturally produces the area law term αL but cannot account for the constant topological term γ.

The resolution to this puzzle arises from considering more realistic bulk actions. To model a boundary theory with a U(1) symmetry and topological order, the dual bulk theory in AdS is often described by an Einstein-Maxwell theory with an additional Chern–Simons term. The bulk action for the gauge field A includes:

$S_{\text{CS}} = \frac{k}{4\pi} \int_{\mathcal{M}} A \wedge F$

where F=dA is the field strength, k is the level of the Chern–Simons term, and the integral is over the bulk manifold M. The presence of this topological term in the bulk action requires a modification of the holographic entanglement entropy formula. As shown by Matthew Headrick and others, the formula must be corrected to include a contribution from the bulk gauge field integrated over the minimal surface $\gamma_A$. The generalized formula is:

$S(A) = \frac{\text{Area}(\gamma_A)}{4 G_N} + S_{\text{CS}}(\gamma_A)$

where $S_{CS}(\gamma_A)$ is the contribution from the Chern-Simons term evaluated on the entanglement surface. This term can be expressed as an integral of the gauge potential A over $\gamma_A$.

When this formula is applied, a remarkable correspondence emerges:

1. The $Area(\gamma_A) / 4G_N$ term correctly reproduces the leading-order area law term, αL.

2. The Chern–Simons term $S_{CS}(\gamma_A)$ is topological in nature and evaluates to a constant value, independent of the size L of the region.

By comparing the holographic result with the field theory definition, a direct identification can be made:

$\gamma = -S_{\text{CS}}(\gamma_A)$

This provides a new, non-trivial entry in the AdS/CFT dictionary: the topological entanglement entropy γ of the boundary theory is directly determined by the topological Chern–Simons term in the bulk gravity theory. This holographic duality between boundary topological order and a bulk Chern–Simons theory is a key success of the AdS/CMT program, demonstrating that the geometric nature of holography is powerful enough to capture subtle, quantum-topological features of strongly-correlated systems. This framework also extends to discrete gauge theories, where a bulk BF topological term can correctly reproduce the TEE of boundary theories like the toric code.
