= Edward L. Wright =

American astrophysicist and cosmologist (born 1947)

Edward L. (Ned) Wright (born August 25, 1947, in Washington, D.C.) is an American astrophysicist and cosmologist. He has worked on space missions including the Cosmic Background Explorer (COBE), Wide-field Infrared Survey Explorer (WISE), and Wilkinson Microwave Anisotropy Probe (WMAP) projects.

Wright received his ABscl (Physics in 1969) and PhD (Astronomy in 1976) degrees in high-altitude rocket measurement of the cosmic microwave background radiation from Harvard University, where he was a junior fellow. After teaching as a tenured associate professor in the MIT Physics Department for a while, Wright has been a professor at UCLA since 1981.

Wright researches infrared astronomy and cosmology. He has studied fractal dust grains which are able to absorb and emit efficiently at millimeter wavelengths, and other aspects that may be important factors in understanding the cosmic microwave background. As an interdisciplinary scientist on the Space InfraRed Telescope Facility (SIRTF) Science Working Group, Wright began working on the SIRTF project (renamed the Spitzer Space Telescope) in 1976. He was an active member of the teams working on the Cosmic Background Explorer (COBE) beginning in 1978. He is the principal investigator on the Wide field Infrared Survey Explorer (WISE) project. Wright is also a member of the current science team on the Wilkinson Microwave Anisotropy Probe (WMAP), which was launched in June 2001. WMAP followed up the COBE discovery of early fluctuations in the developing Universe.

From 1994 to 1998, he served as a science editor of The Astrophysical Journal.

== Honors and awards ==
- NASA Exceptional Scientific Achievement Medal for his work on COBE, in 1992.
- Named the CSEOL Distinguished Scientist of the Year, in 1995.
- Elected to the US National Academy of Sciences in 2011.
- Breakthrough Prize in Fundamental Physics, December 2017
