= Raphael Flauger =

German physicist and cosmologist

Raphael Flauger is a German theoretical physicist and cosmologist.

== Education and career ==
After receiving in June 1998 the Abitur from the Leibniz-Gymnasium in Altdorf bei Nürnberg, Raphael Flauger entered in July 1998 the German Air Force for his compulsory military service. In October 1998 he enrolled in a long-distance education program in mechanical engineering offered by TU Dresden. After the completion of his military service in April 1999, he enrolled in the physics program at the University of Würzburg. There he received the Vordiplom in August 2000. He continued to study physics at the University of Würzburg until July 2001. In 2001 he joined the Weinberg Theory Group at the University of Texas at Austin (UT Austin). There in August 2002, he receive an M.A. in physics under the supervision of Sonia Paban. In autumn 2002, Flauger matriculated at Imperial College London. There in September 2003, he received an M.S in Quantum Fields and Fundamental Forces under the supervision of Arkady Tseytlin. After received his M.S., Flauger returned, as a Ph.D. student, to study with the Weinberg Theory Group at UT Austin. From January to August, he was a Graduate Fellow at the Kavli Institute for Theoretical Physics (KITP). In August 2009 at UT Austin, he successfully defended his doctoral dissertation entitled Constraining Fundamental Physics with Cosmology. His doctor supervisor was Steven Weinberg. In addition to Weinberg, Flauger's doctoral committee consisted of Arno Bohm, Willy Fischler, Dan Freed, and Sonia Paban.

As a postdoc, Flauger did research from 2009 to 2011 at Yale University. From 2011 to 2014 he was a postdoctoral fellow at New York University, as well as a temporary member of the Institute for Advanced Study. He was from 2014 to 2015 an assistant professor at Carnegie Mellon University and from 2015 to 2019 an assistant professor at UT Austin. In 2019 he joined, as an associate professor, the physics department of the University of California, San Diego, where he is now a full professor.

Flauger is interested in predictions about the early universe from the Cosmic Microwave Background (CMB), in particular from the data of the Wilkinson Microwave Anisotropy Probe (WMAP) and the Planck space-based observatory. He is also interested in quantum field theories, quantum gravity and string theory (both with phenomenological models and with formal aspects).

In 2014, Flauger played a key role in criticizing and refuting the then sensational claims of the BICEP2 collaboration (2nd generation of Background Imaging of Cosmic Extragalactic Polarization project) to have found gravitational waves and evidence of inflation in the CMB (even before the analysis of the Planck telescope team). At that time (2013–2014) he was at the Institute for Advanced Study. He was the lead author of an article, published in May 2014, indicating that polarized emission from interstellar dust could explain the findings of the BICEP2 science team.

As a doctoral student of Weinberg at UT Austin, Flauger had predicted the B-modes in the CMB as an indication of gravitational waves that the BICEP2 science team thought they had found. Flauger then worked on phenomenological string theory models that predict observably large B-modes, whereas previously it was generally assumed that such B-modes would not be predicted in string theory models because the associated energies are close to the GUT scale. According to Flauger and colleagues, this also opened up the possibility of testing string theory with CMB data. For example, he searched with Eva Silverstein and Liam McAllister for axion signals in the CMB, which are predicted by some string theories.

In 2015 Flauger received a two-year Sloan Research Fellowship. In 2016 he was awarded a New Horizons in Physics Prize.

== Selected publications ==
- Flauger, Raphael; Paban, Sonia; Robbins, Daniel; Wrase, Timm (2009). "Searching for slow-roll moduli inflation in massive type IIA supergravity with metric fluxes". Physical Review D. 79 (8) 086011. arXiv:0812.3886. Bibcode:2009PhRvD..79h6011F. doi:10.1103/PhysRevD.79.086011.
- Caceres, Elena; Flauger, Raphael; Wrase, Timm (2009). "Hagedorn Systems from Backreacted Finite Temperature N_f=2N_c Backgrounds". arXiv:0908.4483 [hep-th].
- Flauger, Raphael; Paban, Sonia; Robbins, Daniel; Wrase, Timm (2009). "Searching for slow-roll moduli inflation in massive type IIA supergravity with metric fluxes". Physical Review D. 79 (8) 086011. arXiv:0812.3886. Bibcode:2009PhRvD..79h6011F. doi:10.1103/PhysRevD.79.086011.
- Easther, Richard; Flauger, Raphael; Gilmore, James B. (2011). "Delayed reheating and the breakdown of coherent oscillations". Journal of Cosmology and Astroparticle Physics (4): 027. arXiv:1003.3011. Bibcode:2011JCAP...04..027E. doi:10.1088/1475-7516/2011/04/027.
- Amin, Mustafa A.; Easther, Richard; Finkel, Hal; Flauger, Raphael; Hertzberg, Mark P. (2012). "Oscillons after Inflation". Physical Review Letters. 108 (24) 241302. arXiv:1106.3335. Bibcode:2012PhRvL.108x1302A. doi:10.1103/PhysRevLett.108.241302. PMID 23004256.
- Dubovsky, Sergei; Flauger, Raphael; Gorbenko, Victor (2012). "Effective string theory revisited". Journal of High Energy Physics (9) 44. arXiv:1203.1054. Bibcode:2012JHEP...09..044D. doi:10.1007/JHEP09(2012)044.
- Dubovsky, Sergei; Flauger, Raphael; Gorbenko, Victor (2012). "Solving the simplest theory of quantum gravity". Journal of High Energy Physics (9) 133. arXiv:1205.6805. Bibcode:2012JHEP...09..133D. doi:10.1007/JHEP09(2012)133.
- Flauger, Raphael; Hellerman, Simeon; Schmidt-Colinet, Cornelius; Sudano, Matthew (2012). "The One-Loop Effective Kähler Potential. I: Chiral Multiplets". arXiv:1205.3492 [hep-th].
- Flauger, Raphael; Hill, J. Colin; Spergel, David N. (2014). "Toward an understanding of foreground emission in the BICEP2 region". Journal of Cosmology and Astroparticle Physics (8): 039. arXiv:1405.7351. Bibcode:2014JCAP...08..039F. doi:10.1088/1475-7516/2014/08/039.
- Spergel, David N.; Flauger, Raphael; Hložek, Renée (2015). "Planck data reconsidered". Physical Review D. 91 (2) 023518. arXiv:1312.3313. Bibcode:2015PhRvD..91b3518S. doi:10.1103/PhysRevD.91.023518.
- Aloni, Daniel; Blum, Kfir; Flauger, Raphael (2017). "Cosmic microwave background constraints on primordial black hole dark matter". Journal of Cosmology and Astroparticle Physics (5): 017. arXiv:1612.06811. Bibcode:2017JCAP...05..017A. doi:10.1088/1475-7516/2017/05/017.
- Flauger, Raphael; Mirbabayi, Mehrdad; Senatore, Leonardo; Silverstein, Eva (2017). "Productive interactions: Heavy particles and non-Gaussianity". Journal of Cosmology and Astroparticle Physics (10): 058. arXiv:1606.00513. Bibcode:2017JCAP...10..058F. doi:10.1088/1475-7516/2017/10/058.
- Clough, Katy; Lim, Eugene A.; Dinunno, Brandon S.; Fischler, Willy; Flauger, Raphael; Paban, Sonia (2017). "Robustness of inflation to inhomogeneous initial conditions". Journal of Cosmology and Astroparticle Physics (9): 025. arXiv:1608.04408. Bibcode:2017JCAP...09..025C. doi:10.1088/1475-7516/2017/09/025.
- Baumann, Daniel; Beutler, Florian; Flauger, Raphael; Green, Daniel; Slosar, Anže; Vargas-Magaña, Mariana; Wallisch, Benjamin; Yèche, Christophe (2019). "First constraint on the neutrino-induced phase shift in the spectrum of baryon acoustic oscillations". Nature Physics. 15 (5): 465–469. arXiv:1803.10741. Bibcode:2019NatPh..15..465B. doi:10.1038/s41567-019-0435-6. 2020
- Elvis, Martin; et al. (2020). "The Case for Probe-class NASA Astrophysics Missions". Bulletin of the American Astronomical Society. 51 (7): 140. arXiv:2002.12739. Bibcode:2019BAAS...51g.140E.
- Flauger, Raphael; Gorbenko, Victor; Joyce, Austin; McAllister, Liam; Shiu, Gary; Silverstein, Eva (2022). "Snowmass White Paper: Cosmology at the Theory Frontier". arXiv:2203.07629 [hep-th].
- Elley, Matthew; Aurrekoetxea, Josu C.; Clough, Katy; Flauger, Raphael; Giannadakis, Panagiotis; Lim, Eugene A. (2025). "Robustness of inflation to kinetic inhomogeneities". Journal of Cosmology and Astroparticle Physics (1): 050. arXiv:2405.03490. Bibcode:2025JCAP...01..050E. doi:10.1088/1475-7516/2025/01/050.
