= Alessandra Corsi =

Italian astronomer

Alessandra Corsi is an Italian astronomer known for her work as part of the LIGO Scientific Collaboration on gravitational-wave astronomy, and on multi-messenger astronomy combining gravitational and electromagnetic signals. She is an associate professor of physics and astronomy at Texas Tech University.

== Education and career ==
Corsi earned a laurea in physics from Sapienza University of Rome in 2003, and completed a Ph.D. at Sapienza University in 2007.

After postdoctoral research at Sapienza University, Pennsylvania State University, and the California Institute of Technology, she became an assistant professor of physics at George Washington University in 2012. She moved to a position at Texas Tech University in 2014. She is the W. H. Miller professor at Johns Hopkins University.

== Recognition ==
Corsi was named a Fellow of the American Physical Society (APS) in 2019, after a nomination from the APS Division of Astrophysics, "for major contributions to the discovery of both gravitational wave sources and their electromagnetic counterparts". The Academy of Medicine, Engineering and Science of Texas gave her their 2020 Edith and Peter O'Donnell Award in Science. She was a 2022 winner of the New Horizons in Physics Prize, with three of her LIGO collaborators, "for leadership in laying foundations for electromagnetic observations of sources of gravitational waves, and leadership in extracting rich information from the first observed collision of two neutron stars".
