= Paola Pinilla =

Colombian astrophysicist

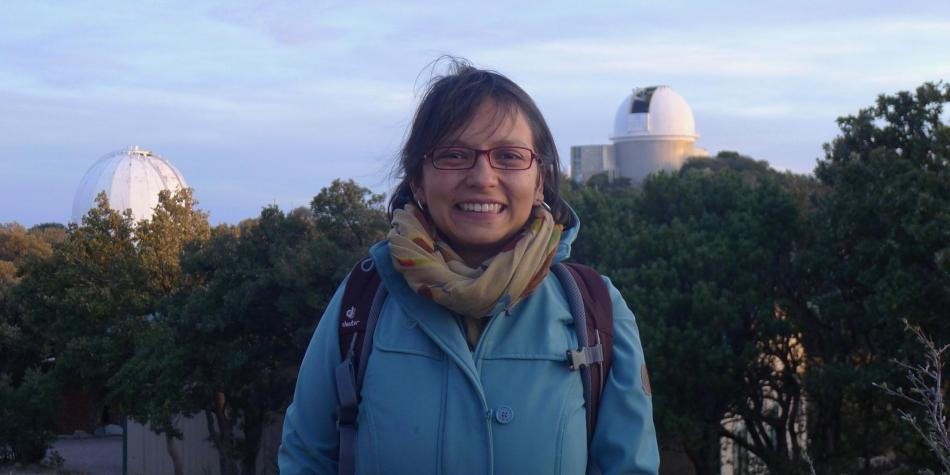
Pinilla in 2018

Paola Andrea Pinilla Ortiz is a Colombian astrophysicist whose research concerns the accretion of interplanetary dust clouds into protoplanetary disks as part of the formation of exoplanets. Educated in Colombia and Germany, she works in England as Professor of Astrophysics at the Mullard Space Science Laboratory, part of the Department of Space & Climate Physics at University College London.

== Education and career ==
Pinilla is originally from Bogotá, and was inspired to go into astronomy following the interest of her older brother, and by watching the television series Cosmos: A Personal Voyage.

As a student at the University of the Andes (Colombia), Pinilla earned a bachelor's degree in physics with a minor in mathematics in 2007 and a master's degree in physics in 2009. She went to Heidelberg University in Germany for doctoral study in physics, completing her Ph.D. there in 2013. Her dissertation, Testing models of dust evolution in protoplanetary disks with millimeter observations, was supervised by Cornelis P. Dullemond.

After postdoctoral research at Leiden University in the Netherlands and as a NASA Hubble Fellow at the University of Arizona in the US, in 2018 she won a Sofia Kovalevskaya Award from the Alexander von Humboldt Foundation, funding her research for a five-year term as a group leader at the Max Planck Institute for Astronomy in Heidelberg. She moved to University College London as an associate professor in 2022, being promoted to professor of astrophysics in 2026.

== Recognition ==
Pinilla was a 2024 recipient of the New Horizons in Physics Prize, jointly with her coauthors Laura M. Pérez, Nienke van der Marel, and Til Birnstiel, "for the prediction, discovery, and modeling of dust traps in young circumstellar disks, solving a long-standing problem in planet formation".

In 2025, Pinilla received the Royal Astronomical Society Price Medal.

In 2026, Pinilla was named a laureate of the Blavatnik Awards for Young Scientists in the United Kingdom, winning in the physical sciences and engineering category for her "groundbreaking work on planetary formation showing how pressure differences help gather dust particles in localized regions around young stars, allowing their growth from grains to planets." The award included an unrestricted £100,000 prize.
