= Tadashi Takayanagi =

Japanese theoretical physicist (born 1975)

- Born: 高柳匡; 11 October 1975; Kawasaki, Kanagawa, Japan
- Education: University of Tokyo
- Known for: Ryu–Takayanagi conjecture
- Awards: Nishinomiya-Yukawa Memorial Prize (2013); New Horizons in Physics Prizes of the Breakthrough Prize in Fundamental Physics (2015); Nishina Memorial Prize (2016); Dirac Medal (ICTP) (2024)
- Scientific career
- Fields: Theoretical physics
- Workplaces: Kavli Institute for Theoretical Physics at University of California, Santa Barbara; Yukawa Institute for Theoretical Physics at Kyoto University; Kavli Institute for the Physics and Mathematics of the Universe
- Doctoral advisor: Tohru Eguchi

Tadashi Takayanagi (高柳匡, Takayanagi Tadashi); born October 11, 1975 in Tokyo, is a Japanese theoretical physicist. He is a professor at the Yukawa Institute for Theoretical Physics at Kyoto University.

== Career ==
Takayanagi studied physics at the University of Tokyo, where he received his bachelor's degree in 1998 and his master's degree in 2000, and his doctorate in 2002 under Tohru Eguchi (superstring theory in Melvin background). He was a postdoctoral researcher at Harvard University (Jefferson Physical Laboratory) until 2005 and at the Kavli Institute for Theoretical Physics at University of California, Santa Barbara in 2005/06. In 2006 he became assistant professor, in 2008 associate professor and in 2012 professor in Kyoto. He is also at Kavli Institute for the Physics and Mathematics of the Universe in Kashiwa.

He works on string theory. He is known for a 2006 paper with Shinsei Ryu, later known as the Ryu–Takayanagi conjecture. In that research, they calculated the entropy from quantum entanglement in conformal field theory via the Bekenstein–Hawking entropy of black holes in the context of Juan Maldacena's holographic principle and conformal field theories on a surface correspond to a theory of gravity in the enclosed volume.

== Honors and awards ==
In 2013 he received the Nishinomiya-Yukawa Memorial Prize from the Yukawa Memorial Foundation with Ryu. He received the 2015 New Horizons in Physics Prizes of the Breakthrough Prize in Fundamental Physics with Ryu, Horacio Casini, and Marina Huerta for their "fundamental ideas about entropy in quantum field theory and quantum gravity". In 2016 he was awarded the Nishina Memorial Prize for the "discovery and development of the holographic entanglement entropy formula". In 2024, he was again awarded the Dirac Medal of the ICTP together with Ryu, Horacio Casini, and Marina Huerta for "their insights on quantum entropy in quantum gravity and quantum field theories".

== Publication ==
- Ryu, Shinsei; Takayanagi, Tadashi (2006). "Holographic derivation of entanglement entropy from AdS/CFT". Physical Review Letters. 96: 181602. arXiv:hep-th/0603001.
- Nishioka, Tatsuma; Ryu, Shinsei; Takayanagi, Tadashi (2009). "Holographic entanglement entropy: an overview". Journal of Physics A. 42: 504008. arXiv:0905.0932.
