= Wickelphone =

A Wickelphone is a sequence of three letters or symbols, which occur together in a word. For example, the word strip may be decomposed into a set of trigrams such as rip and str — these are Wickelphones. The term was devised by James McClelland and David Rumelhart in reference to the work of Wayne Wickelgren in 1969. Rumelhart and McClelland then extended the idea by expressing the triples in phonetic terms as Wickelfeatures. For example, the Wickelphone tri would correspond to a Wickelfeature of "stop, lateral, vowel".
