= Kirsten Wickelgren =

American mathematician

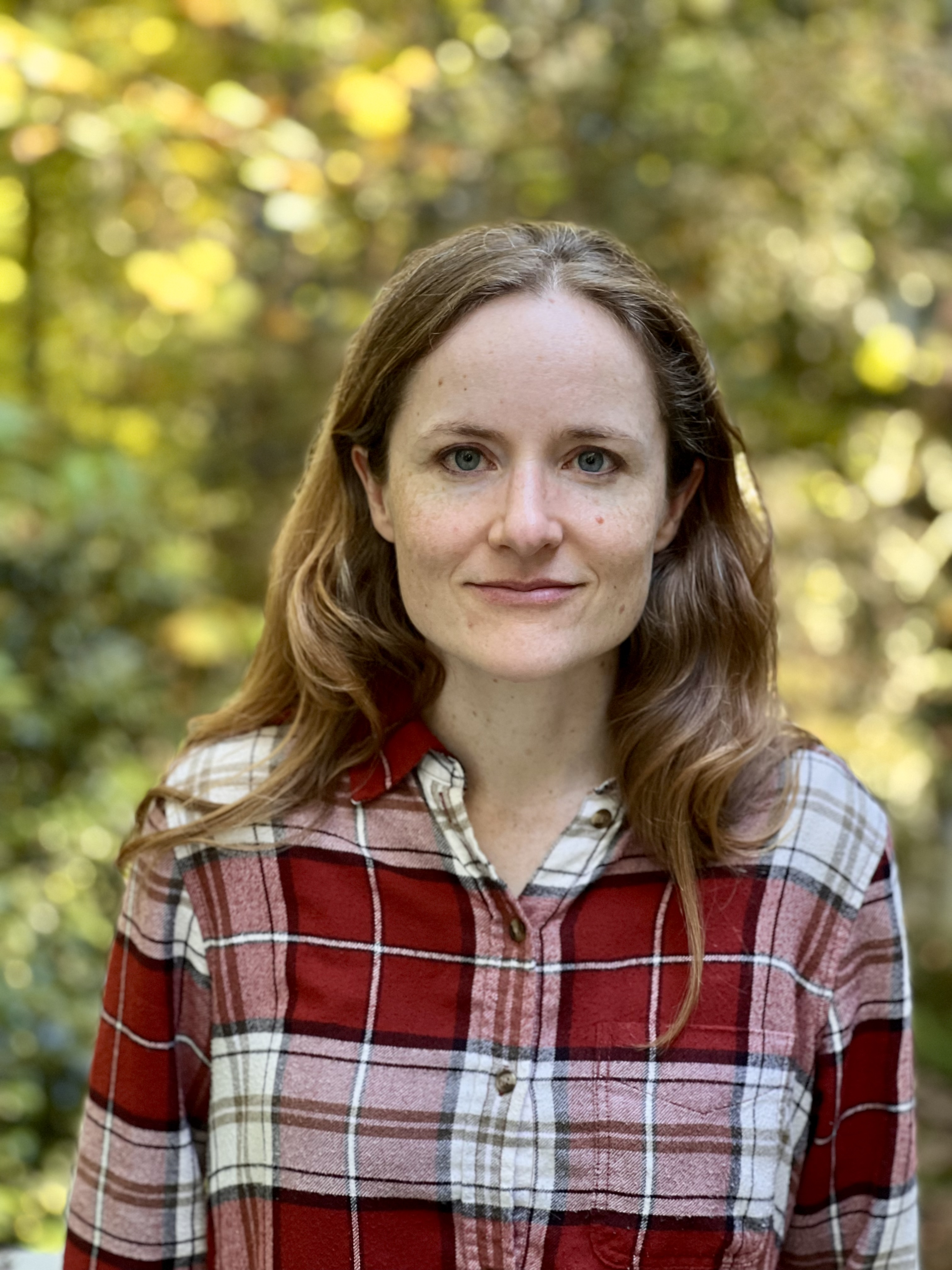
- Kirsten Wickelgren in 2022
- Education: Harvard University; Stanford University
- Scientific career
- Fields: Mathematics
- Workplaces: Harvard University; Georgia Institute of Technology; Duke University
- Thesis: Lower central series obstructions to homotopy sections of curves over number fields (2009)
- Doctoral advisor: Gunnar Carlsson

Kirsten Graham Wickelgren is an American mathematician whose research interests range over multiple areas including algebraic geometry, algebraic topology, arithmetic geometry, and anabelian geometry. She is a professor of mathematics at Duke University.

== Education and career ==
Wickelgren was one of the finalists in the 1999 Intel Science Talent Search. She majored in mathematics at Harvard University, graduating magna cum laude in 2003. After a year at the École normale supérieure (Paris), she went to Stanford University for doctoral study in mathematics, completing her Ph.D. in 2009. Her dissertation, Lower Central Series Obstructions To Homotopy Sections of Curves Over Number Fields, was supervised by Gunnar Carlsson.

She returned to Harvard as a five-year postdoctoral research fellow, funded by the American Institute of Mathematics, and in 2013 became an assistant professor at Georgia Tech. In 2018 she was tenured as associate professor there, and in 2019 she moved to Duke University as a full professor.

In 2017, Wickelgren and Jesse Kass used motivic homotopy theory to count the lines on a smooth cubic surface, generalizing known results in enumerative geometry, and stimulating new research in the field.

== Recognition ==
Wickelgren was named to the 2023 class of Fellows of the American Mathematical Society, "for contributions to algebraic topology, algebraic geometry, and number theory".

== Family ==
Wickelgren is daughter of psychologists Norma Graham and Wayne Wickelgren, sister of physicist Peter W. Graham, and half-sister of lawyer Abraham Wickelgren. She is granddaughter of psychologist Frances K. Graham and great-granddaughter of surgeon Evarts Ambrose Graham.
