= Research.com =

Academic rankings website

Research.com is an online platform that compiles academic rankings and educational resources.

== History ==
Research.com was founded in 2014 by Imed Bouchrika, a computer scientist and researcher, as Guide2Research.

In 2022, Guide2Research was renamed as Research.com.

== Platform ==
Research.com publishes rankings of universities, researchers, academic conferences, and journals. It also provides information on scholarships. Rankings are based on data from publicly available sources such as Google Scholar, OpenAlex, Crossref, and Integrated Postsecondary Education Data System.
