= Laura Pérez (astronomer) =

Chilean astronomer

Laura Pérez is an astronomer and assistant professor at the University of Chile. She researches the formation and evolution of planetary systems to understand how the Solar System was formed. She is one of the winners of the 2024 New Horizons Prize in Physics Breakthrough Prize, for her research into dust traps in young star formation, giving insight into a long-standing mystery in planet formation.

== Biography ==
Pérez earned her BSc and MSc in astronomy from the University of Chile and obtained her Ph.D. from the California Institute of Technology in the United States, where she studied planet formation. She later worked at the National Radio Astronomy Observatory and Max Planck Institute for Radio Astronomy for her postdoctoral work.

At the University of Chile, Pérez studies the formation and evolution of planetary systems and young stars. Her work in dust traps in young planet formation earned her the 2024 New Horizons in Physics Breakthrough Prize, alongside Paola Pinilla, Nienke van der Marel and Til Birnstiel.
