= Bernard J. Ward =

American lawyer

Bernard J. Ward (August 31, 1925 – May 7, 1982) was a legal educator and authority on the federal courts. He practiced general law in New Orleans, 1949–1953, and taught in the law schools at Loyola University New Orleans, 1952–1953, at Notre Dame, 1954–1968, and at the University of Texas at Austin, 1966–1982.

Bernard J. Ward was born in New Orleans. A member of the American Law Institute, Professor Ward spoke frequently at educational conferences for the federal judiciary, and was highly regarded by both students and federal judges. He drafted the Federal Rules of Appellate Procedure, which are used throughout the federal courts, and was co-author of "Appeals to Court of Appeals," a well-known treatise. Ward served as reporter to the Advisory Committee on Appellate Rules of the Judicial Conference of the United States 1961–1968; the Standing Committee on Rules of Practice and Procedure of the Judicial Conference, 1970–1971; and the Advisory Committee on Civil Rules, 1971–1978. He was a member of the Standing Committee from 1978 until his death.

Ward died in Austin, Texas, on May 7, 1982. In his honor, Professor Ward's colleagues and former students endowed the Bernard J. Ward Centennial Professorship at UT Law School.
