= Asimina Arvanitaki =

Greek physicist

Asimina Arvanitaki (born 1980) is a Greek theoretical physicist and Stavros Niarchos Foundation Aristarchus Chair in Theoretical Physics at the Perimeter Institute for Theoretical Physics in Waterloo, Ontario, Canada. In 2017, she was awarded the New Horizons in Physics prize.

== Areas of research ==
Arvanitaki's work has focused on finding novel experiments to explore topics in theoretical physics. Her work has been described as working at the "precision frontier" as it involves measuring very small variations in well-understood phenomena to illuminate theoretical predictions.

In 2016, Arvanitaki, Savas Dimopoulos and Ken Van Tilburg proposed a method of detecting dark matter as a matter wave, using conventional gravitational wave detectors. She has proposed using the Advanced Laser Interferometer Gravitational-Wave Observatory to observe the gravitational waves from black hole collisions to detect the presence of QCD axions, a candidate for explaining dark matter. She has also proposed using neutrino and gamma-ray telescopes, such as the Fermi telescope, Hess, or IceCube, to search for dark matter decay products predicted by certain theories of super-symmetry.

== Education and early career ==
Arvanitaki pursued her post-doctoral research at Stanford University. She joined the Perimeter Institute in 2014. She is the first woman to hold a named chair at the institute. Arvanitaki suggested naming the chair for Aristarchus — the ancient Greek astronomer who surmised that the Earth rotated around the sun centuries before Coperniucs — in a nod to the cosmological scope of her research, the Greek background of the Stavros Niarchos Foundation, and her own Greek origin.
