= Breakthrough Prize =

International scientific awards

- Awarded for: Outstanding contributions in life sciences, fundamental physics, and mathematics
- Presented by: Breakthrough Prize Board
- First award: 2012; 14 years ago
- Website: breakthroughprize.org

The Breakthrough Prizes are a set of international awards bestowed in three categories by the Breakthrough Prize Board in recognition of scientific advances. The awards are part of several "Breakthrough" philanthropic programs launched by the foundation co-founded by Yuri Milner and his wife Julia Milner, along with Breakthrough Initiatives and Breakthrough Junior Challenge.

- Breakthrough Prize in Mathematics
- Breakthrough Prize in Fundamental Physics
- Breakthrough Prize in Life Sciences

The Breakthrough Prizes were founded by Sergey Brin and his then wife Anne Wojcicki, Priscilla Chan and Mark Zuckerberg, and Yuri and Julia Milner. The Prizes have been sponsored by the personal foundations established by Sergey Brin, Priscilla Chan and Mark Zuckerberg, Ma Huateng, Jack Ma, Yuri and Julia Milner, and Anne Wojcicki. Committees of previous laureates choose the winners from candidates nominated in a process that is online and open to the public.

Laureates receive $3 million each in prize money. They attend a televised award ceremony designed to celebrate their achievements and inspire the next generation of scientists. As part of the ceremony schedule, they also engage in a program of lectures and discussions. Those that go on to make fresh discoveries remain eligible for future Breakthrough Prizes.

Both the 2023 and 2024 ceremonies were held in Los Angeles at the Academy Museum of Motion Pictures.

== Trophy ==
The trophy was created by artist Olafur Eliasson. Like much of Eliasson's work, the sculpture explores the common ground between art and science. It is molded into the shape of a toroid, recalling natural forms found from black holes and galaxies to seashells and coils of DNA.

== Ceremonies ==
| # | Ceremony | Date | Year | Host(s) | Network | Site |
|---|---|---|---|---|---|---|
| 1st | 2013 Fundamental Physics Prize Ceremony | March 20, 2013 | 2012 | Morgan Freeman | None | Geneva, Switzerland |
| 2nd | 2014 Breakthrough Prize Ceremony | December 12, 2013 | 2013 | Kevin Spacey | Science Channel | Hangar One, Mountain View, California |
| 3rd | 2015 Breakthrough Prize Ceremony | November 9, 2014 | 2014 | Seth MacFarlane | Discovery Channel & Science Channel (U.S.); BBC World News (worldwide) | Hangar One, Mountain View, California |
| 4th | 2016 Breakthrough Prize Ceremony | November 8, 2015 | 2015 | Seth MacFarlane | National Geographic; FOX | Hangar One, Mountain View, California |
| 5th | 2017 Breakthrough Prize Ceremony | December 4, 2016 | 2016 | Morgan Freeman | National Geographic; FOX | Hangar One, Mountain View, California |
| 6th | 2018 Breakthrough Prize Ceremony | November 3, 2017 | 2017 | Morgan Freeman | National Geographic | Hangar One, Mountain View, California |
| 7th | 2019 Breakthrough Prize Ceremony | November 4, 2018 | 2018 | Pierce Brosnan | National Geographic | Hangar One, Mountain View, California |
| 8th | 2020 Breakthrough Prize Ceremony | November 3, 2019 | 2019 | James Corden | National Geographic | Hangar One, Mountain View, California |
| 9th | 2023 Breakthrough Prize Ceremony | April 15, 2023 | 2020–2022 | James Corden | YouTube | Academy Museum of Motion Pictures, Hollywood, Los Angeles |
| 10th | 2024 Breakthrough Prize Ceremony | April 13, 2024 | 2023 | James Corden | YouTube | Academy Museum of Motion Pictures, Hollywood, Los Angeles |
| 11th | 2025 Breakthrough Prize Ceremony | April 12, 2025 | 2024 | James Corden | YouTube | Barker Hangar |
| 12th | 2026 Breakthrough Prize Ceremony | April 18, 2026 | 2025 | James Corden | YouTube | Barker Hangar |

== 2025 ceremony controversy ==
During the 2025 ceremony, Seth Rogen, who was presenting a physics prize alongside Edward Norton, attracted attention with some unscripted jokes regarding the science policy of the second Donald Trump administration. They appeared to target some figures of the tech oligarchy linked to the Breakthrough Prize. He stated:

"And it’s amazing that others in this room underwrote electing a man who, in the last week, single-handedly destroyed all of American science."

and:

"It’s amazing how much good science you can destroy with $320 million and RFK Jr, very fast."

The comments were edited out from the Youtube broadcast, which aired a week later. A spokesperson for the Breakthrough Prize Foundation said, “This year’s ceremony lasted longer than the prior few years, and several edits were made in order to meet the originally planned run time.” However, it's unclear whether anything else was edited out.

== See also ==
- Breakthrough Initiatives
- Breakthrough Starshot
