= Center for Gravitational Wave Astronomy and Astrophysics =

Research center at Syracuse University

Center for Gravitational Wave Astronomy & Astrophysics
- Parent institution: Syracuse University
- Established: October 13, 2023
- Head: Stefan Ballmer
- Faculty: ~10
- Key people: Peter Saulson, Duncan A. Brown
- Location: Syracuse, New York, U.S.
- Website: gravitationalwaves.syracuse.edu

The Center for Gravitational Wave Astronomy and Astrophysics (CGWAA) is a research center at Syracuse University. Research at the CGWAA includes the study of gravitational wave astronomy, designing of Cosmic Explorer next-generation observatory, development new quantum optics technologies and precision measurement to build new detectors. The center was established in 2023 and has hosted seminar series and several conferences.

== Founding ==
The center was established on October 13, 2023, to combine the various groups working on the LIGO Scientific project.

The LIGO research at Syracuse began with theoretical contributions from Peter Bergmann, Joshua N. Goldberg, and Roger Penrose, and Syracuse had a comparatively large number of collaborators on the team that made the first observation of gravitational waves in 2015. The department of physics has had collaborations with CERN, LIGO Scientific Collaboration, and Fermilab, among other institutes.

== Funding ==
In October 2023, the center received over $1.5M in funding from the National Science Foundation to study gravitational waves and design next-generation observatories. The center hosts proposal-writing workshops at Syracuse University's Minnowbrook Conference Center. Its collaboration with researchers from MIT, Penn State, California State Fullerton, and the University of Florida resulted in over $9 million in NSF funding.

== People ==
The center is directed by Stefan Ballmer and hosts research groups of Peter Saulson, Duncan A. Brown, Alexander Nitz, Collin Capano, Craig Cahillane, and Georgia Mansell.
