= LIGO Scientific Collaboration =

International physics organization

- Formation: 1997
- Members: 1659 scientists
- LSC Spokesperson: Stephen Fairhurst
- Awards: Special Breakthrough Prize in Fundamental Physics (2016); Gruber Prize in Cosmology (2016); Bruno Rossi Prize (2017); Albert Einstein Medal (2017); Princess of Asturias Award (2017)
- Website: www.ligo.org

The LIGO Scientific Collaboration (LSC) is a scientific collaboration of international physics institutes and research groups dedicated to the search for gravitational waves. It complements the LIGO Laboratory, an organization based at the California Institute of Technology and Massachusetts Institute of Technology which constructed and now operates the LIGO observatories. The LSC contributes to developing detector technologies, assists with collecting and validating data from the LIGO and GEO600 detectors, and is responsible for analyzing the data and publishing scientific results. The LSC is led by a Spokesperson, which as of 2025 is Stephen Fairhurst of Cardiff University.

== History ==
The LSC was established in 1997 as part of a reorganization of the LIGO Project under the leadership of Barry Barish. Its mission is to ensure equal scientific opportunity for individual participants and institutions by organizing research, publications, and all other scientific activities, and it includes scientists from both LIGO Laboratory and collaborating institutions. Barish appointed Rainer Weiss as the first spokesperson. Subsequent spokespersons have been elected by members of the LSC.

LSC members have access to the US-based Advanced LIGO detectors in Hanford, Washington and in Livingston, Louisiana, as well as the GEO600 detector in Sarstedt, Germany. Under an agreement with the European Gravitational Observatory (EGO), LSC members also have access to data from the Virgo detector in Pisa, Italy. While the LSC and the Virgo Collaboration are separate organizations, they cooperate closely and are referred to collectively as "LVC". In 2019, the Japanese KAGRA collaboration signed an agreement to collaborate with the LSC and Virgo and the LIGO-Virgo-KAGRA collective is called "LVK".

On 11 February 2016, the LIGO and Virgo collaborations (Note: The 11 February 2016 announcement team were Kip Thorne, David Reitze, Gabriela González, and Rainer Weiss.) announced that they succeeded in making the first direct gravitational wave observation on 14 September 2015.

== Collaboration leaders ==
Spokespersons of the LIGO Scientific Collaboration, with Assistant or Deputy Spokespersons (when one was appointed)
Spokesperson Name	Term of office	Deputy or Assistant	Notes
Rainer Weiss	1997-2003	none	
Peter Saulson	2003-2007	none	
David Reitze	2007-2011	none	
Gabriela González	2011-2017	Marco Cavaglià, Assistant (2013-2017)	
David Shoemaker	2017-2019	Laura Cadonati, Deputy (2017-2019)	
Patrick Brady	2019-2025	Jess McIver, Deputy (2023-2025)	
Stephen Fairhurst	2025-2027	Peter Shawhan, Deputy (2025-2027)	

== Collaboration member groups ==
Institutional members of the LIGO Scientific Collaboration as of July 2025, from public summary of the LSC roster https://my.ligo.org/census.php

Institution	Country	Website featuring LIGO research
Albert-Einstein-Institut, Hannover	Germany	Binary Merger Observations and Numerical Relativity, Laser Interferometry and Gravitational Wave Astronomy
Albert-Einstein-Institut, Potsdam-Golm	Germany	Astrophysical and Cosmological Relativity
American University	United States	
Australian National University	Australia	Centre for Gravitational Astrophysics
Bard College	United States	
Bar-Ilan University	Israel	
Barry University	United States	
California Institute of Technology	United States	LIGO Lab, Caltech LIGO Astrophysics
California State University, Fullerton	United States	Gravitational Wave Physics and Astronomy Center
California State University, Los Angeles	United States	
Canadian Institute for Theoretical Astrophysics	Canada	
Cardiff University	United Kingdom	Gravity Exploration Institute
Carleton College	United States	
Central Glass and Ceramic Research Institute	India	
Charles Sturt University	Australia	
Chennai Mathematical Institute	India	
Chinese University of Hong Kong	Hong Kong	
Christopher Newport University	United States	
Chung-Ang University	South Korea	
Colorado State University	United States	
Concordia University Wisconsin	United States	
Cornell University	United States	
Directorate of Construction Services and Estate Management, Department of Atomic Energy	India	
Embry-Riddle Aeronautical University	United States	
Eötvös Loránd University	Hungary	Eötvös Gravity Research Group
Ewha Womans University	South Korea	
Georgia Institute of Technology	United States	Center for Relativistic Astrophysics
Goddard Space Flight Center	United States	
Government Victoria College, Palakkad	India	
Haverford College	United States	
Helmut Schmidt University	Germany	
Hobart and William Smith Colleges	United States	
International Centre for Theoretical Sciences, Tata Institute of Fundamental Research	India	
Instituto de Física Teórica (IFT), São Paulo State University	Brazil	
Indian Institute of Technology, Bombay	India	
Indian Institute of Technology, Gandhinagar	India	
Indian Institute of Technology, Hyderabad	India	
Indian Institute of Technology, Madras	India	
Indian Institute of Science Education and Research, Kolkata	India	
Indian Institute of Science Education and Research, Pune	India	
Inje University	South Korea	
Institut de Física d'Altes Energies	Spain	
Institute for Plasma Research, Bhat	India	
Instituto Nacional de Pesquisas Espaciais	Brazil	
Inter-University Centre for Astronomy and Astrophysics	India	
Johns Hopkins University	United States	
Kennesaw State University	United States	
Kenyon College	United States	
King's College London, University of London	United Kingdom	
Korea Astronomy and Space Science Institute	South Korea	
Korea Institute of Science and Technology Information	South Korea	
Leibniz University Hannover	Germany	
LIGO Hanford Observatory	United States	LIGO Hanford Observatory website
LIGO Livingston Observatory	United States	LIGO Livingston Observatory website
Louisiana State University	United States	Experimental & Theoretical General Relativity
Maastricht University	Netherlands	
Marquette University	United States	
Marshall Space Flight Center	United States	
Massachusetts Institute of Technology	United States	MIT LIGO
Missouri University of Science and Technology	United States	
Monash University	Australia	
Montana State University	United States	Gravitational Physics at MSU
Montclair State University	United States	
Moscow State University	Russia	
Nagoya University	Japan	
National Central University	Taiwan	
National Institute for Mathematical Sciences	South Korea	
National Institute of Technology Calicut	India	
National Tsing Hua University	Taiwan	
Niels Bohr Institute	Denmark	
Northeastern University	United States	
Northwestern University	United States	Gravitational Waves & Multi-Messenger Astronomy
Pennsylvania State University	United States	Institute for Gravitation and the Cosmos members in LIGO
Perimeter Institute for Theoretical Physics	Canada	
Queen Mary University of London	United Kingdom	
Rochester Institute of Technology	United States	Center for Computational Relativity and Gravitation
Royal Holloway, University of London	United Kingdom	
Raja Ramanna Centre for Advanced Technology	India	
Rutherford Appleton Laboratory	United Kingdom	
Saha Institute of Nuclear Physics	India	
Seoul National University	South Korea	
Sonoma State University	United States	
Stanford University	United States	Stanford LIGO Group
Stony Brook University, Center for Computational Astrophysics	United States	
St. Thomas University (Florida)	United States	
Sungkyunkwan University	South Korea	
Swinburne University	Australia	ARC Centre of Excellence for Gravitational Wave Discovery
Syracuse University	United States	Center for Gravitational Wave Astronomy and Astrophysics
Tata Institute of Fundamental Research, Mumbai	India	
Technical University of Braunschweig	Germany	
Trinity College (Connecticut)	United States	
Tsinghua University	China	
University College London	United Kingdom	
University of Adelaide	Australia	
University of Antioquia	Spain	
University of Arizona	United States	
University of Arkansas	United States	
University of Birmingham	United Kingdom	Institute for Gravitational Wave Astronomy
University of British Columbia	Canada	
University of Brussels	Belgium	Precision Mechatronics Laboratory
University of California, Berkeley	United States	
University of California, Davis	United States	
University of California, Riverside	United States	
University of Cambridge	United Kingdom	Institute of Astronomy - Cosmology and Fundamental Physics
University of Chicago	United States	
University of Florida	United States	University of Florida Astrophysics
University of Glasgow	United Kingdom	Institute for Gravitational Research
University of Guadalajara	Mexico	
University of Hamburg	Germany	
University of Manitoba	Canada	
University of Maryland, Baltimore County	United States	
University of Maryland, College Park	United States	Gravitation Experiment Group
University of Massachusetts Dartmouth	United States	
University of Melbourne	Australia	
University of Michigan	United States	Michigan Gravitational Wave Group
University of Minnesota	United States	LIGO@UMN
University of Mississippi	United States	
University of Montréal / Polytechnique	Canada	
University of Nevada, Las Vegas	United States	
University of Nottingham	United Kingdom	
University of Oregon	United States	
University of Portsmouth	United Kingdom	
University of Rhode Island	United States	
University of Sannio	Italy	
University of Santiago de Compostela	Spain	
University of Sheffield	United Kingdom	
University of Southampton	United Kingdom	
University of Southern California Information Sciences Institute	United States	
University of Stavanger	Norway	
University of Strathclyde	United Kingdom	
University of Szeged	Hungary	
University of Texas at Austin	United States	
University of Texas Rio Grande Valley	United States	Center for Gravitational Wave Astronomy
University of the Balearic Islands	Spain	Relativity and Gravitation Group
University of the Chinese Academy of Sciences, International Centre for Theoretical Physics Asia-Pacific	China	
University of the West of Scotland	United Kingdom	
University of Tokyo	Japan	Institute for Cosmic Ray Research, Gravitational Wave Group
University of Utah	United States	
University of Warwick	United Kingdom	
University of Washington	United States	
University of Washington Bothell	United States	
University of Western Australia	Australia	
University of Wisconsin, Milwaukee	United States	Center for Gravitation, Cosmology & Astrophysics
University of Zurich	Switzerland	
Vanderbilt University	United States	
Villanova University	United States	
Vrije Universiteit Amsterdam	Netherlands	
Washington State University	United States	
Western Washington University	United States	
