= Duncan Brown =

Duncan Brown may refer to:

- Duncan Brown (cricketer) (born 1972), South African cricketer
- Duncan A. Brown (born 1976), American physicist
