= PKS 0137+012 =

Quasar in the constellation Cetus

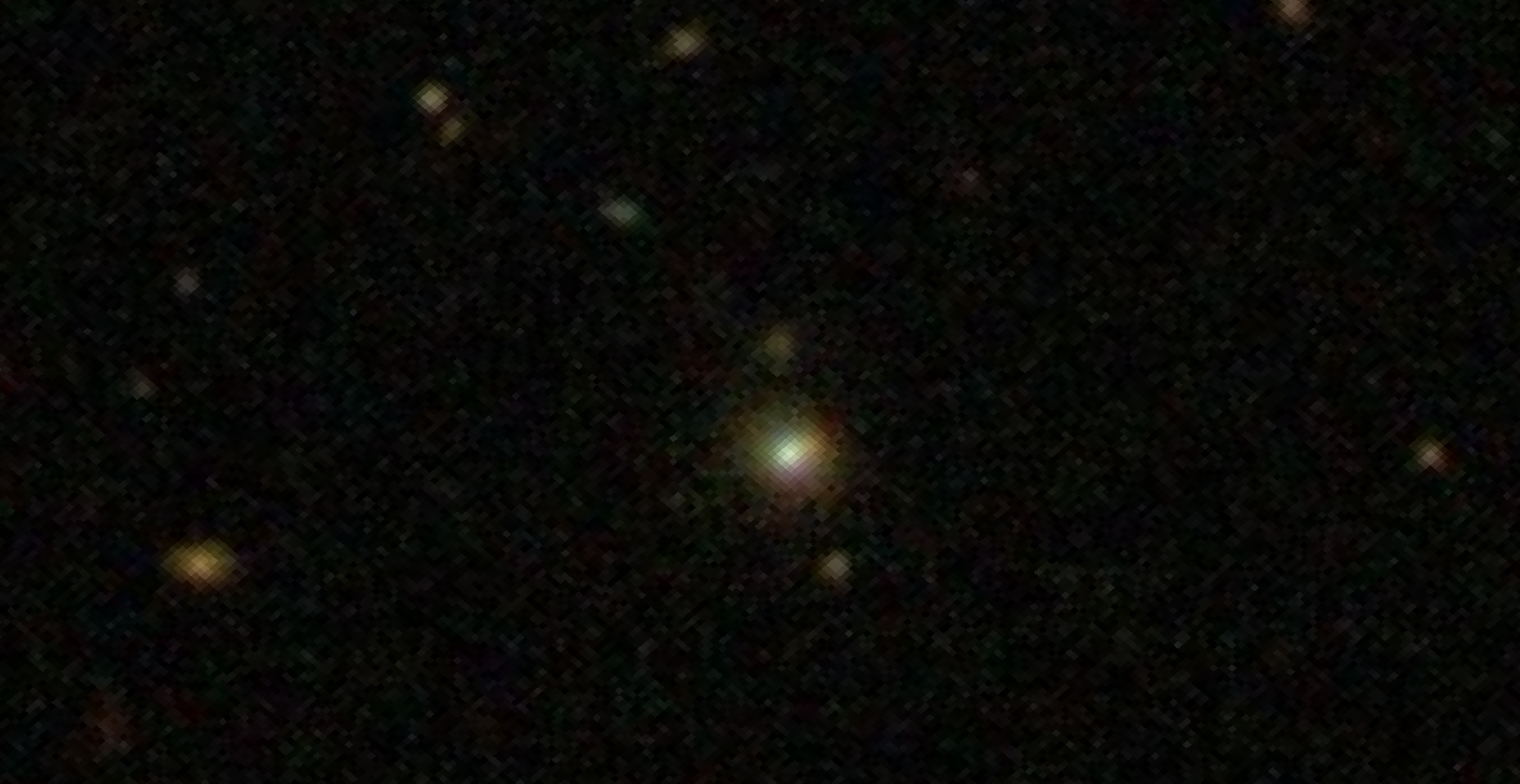
- SDSS image of PKS 0137+012.

Observation data (J2000.0 epoch)
- Constellation: Cetus
- Right ascension: 01^{h} 39^{m} 57.30^{s}
- Declination: +01° 31′ 46.13″
- Redshift: 0.261680
- Heliocentric radial velocity: 78,450 km/s
- Distance: 3.143 Gly
- Apparent magnitude (V): 17.07
- Apparent magnitude (B): 17.12

Characteristics
- Type: Opt.var. RLQ
- Size: ~366,000 ly (112.2 kpc) (estimated)

Other designations
- 4C +01.04, 2MASX J01395752+0131461, PGC 6160, UM 355, PHL 1093, OC +062, TXS 0137+012, NVSS J013957+013151

PKS 0137+012 also known as PHL 1093, is a radio-loud quasar located in the constellation Cetus. The quasar has a redshift of (z) 0.261, meaning it is estimated to be located 3.14 billion light-years away and was first discovered as a discrete source by astronomers in 1968.

== Description ==
PKS 0137+012 is hosted by a large elliptical galaxy, specifically an early-type galaxy based on a two-dimensional modelling technique. It is known to have a close companion located 1.0 arcseconds away suggestive of a close interaction.

The estimated stellar population age for this galaxy suggests that it is 1.7 billion years old, and has a supermassive black hole with a mass of 2.2 × 10^{9} M_{☉}. A bright knot feature is seen west of its nucleus.

The radio source of PKS 0137+012 is compact. Observations of it made in 1978 have shown this source to contain a flat-spectrum radio component at the quasar's position with a steep-spectrum component located at the ending point of an optical jet, making this similar to the radio source structure of 3C 273. A radio map made by the Very Large Array also showed it has a complex radio lobe featuring a curved structure on its north-eastern side caused by precession of its jet. Three other components were discovered with one of them being described as the strongest. It has a flux density of 0.801 ± 0.008 at 1125 MHz.
