= Jesse L. Greenstein =

American astronomer

- Born: Jesse Leonard Greenstein; October 15, 1909; New York City, New York
- Died: October 21, 2002 (aged 93)
- Education: Harvard University
- Awards: California Scientist of the Year (1964); Henry Norris Russell Lectureship (1970); Bruce Medal (1971); Petrie Prize Lecture (1971); NASA Distinguished Public Service Medal (1974); Gold Medal of the Royal Astronomical Society (1975)
- Scientific career
- Workplaces: Yerkes Observatory; Caltech
- Doctoral advisor: Donald H. Menzel

Jesse Leonard Greenstein (October 15, 1909 – October 21, 2002) was an American astronomer. His parents were Maurice G. and Leah Feingold.

He earned a Ph.D, with thesis advisor Donald H. Menzel, from Harvard University in 1937, having started there at age 16. Before leaving Harvard, Greenstein was involved in a project with Fred Lawrence Whipple to explain Karl Jansky's discovery of radio waves from the Milky Way and to propose a source. He began his professional career at Yerkes Observatory under Otto Struve and later went to Caltech. With Louis G. Henyey he invented a new spectrograph and a wide-field camera, along with the Henyey-Greenstein phase function. He directed the Caltech astronomy program until 1972 and later did classified work on military reconnaissance satellites.

With Leverett Davis, Jr, he demonstrated in 1949 that the magnetic field in our galaxy is aligned with the spiral arms. His theoretical work with Davis was based on the conclusion just reached by William A. Hiltner that the recently detected polarization of starlight was due to dichroic extinction by interstellar dust grains aligned with the ambient magnetic field.

For the 1965 book Galactic Structure, edited by Blaauw and Schmidt, Greenstein wrote an important chapter on subluminous blue stars.

Greenstein did important work in determining the abundances of the elements in stars, and was, with Maarten Schmidt, among the first to recognize quasars as compact, very distant sources as bright as a galaxy. The spectra of the first quasars discovered, radio sources 3C 48 and 3C 273, were displaced so far to the red due to their redshifts as to be almost unrecognizable, but Greenstein deciphered 3C 48 shortly before Schmidt, his colleague at the Hale Observatories worked out the spectrum of 3C 273.

== Honors ==
Awards

- Henry Norris Russell Lectureship of the American Astronomical Society (1970)
- Bruce Medal (1971)
- Gold Medal of the Royal Astronomical Society (1975)
- Golden Plate Award of the American Academy of Achievement (1980)

=== Honors ===
- Elected to the American Academy of Arts and Sciences (1954)
- Elected to the United States National Academy of Sciences (1957)
- Elected to the American Philosophical Society (1968)

Named after him

- Asteroid 4612 Greenstein
