= 4C +28.07 =

Blazar in the constellation Aries

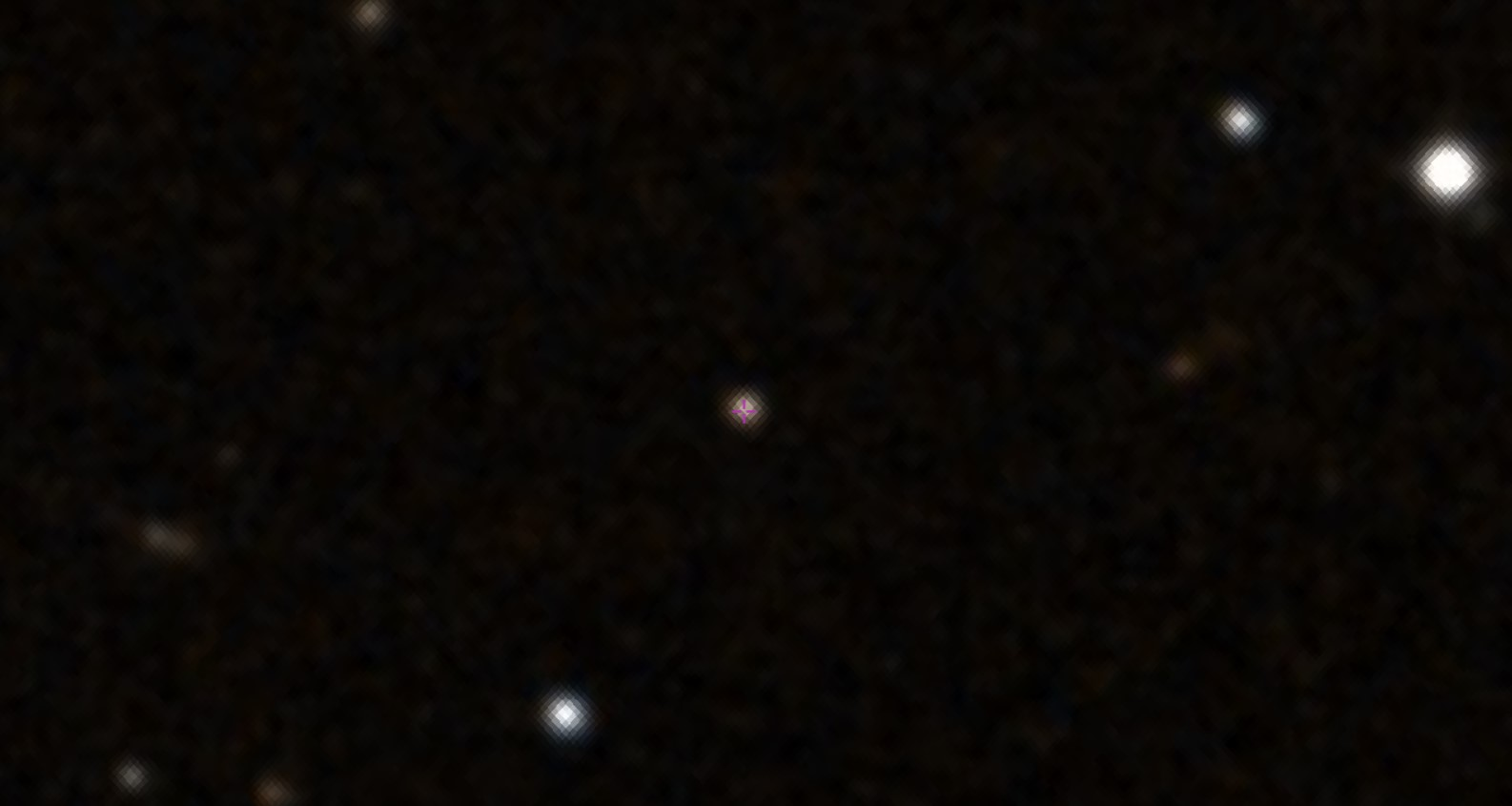
- The blazar 4C +28.07.

Observation data (J2000.0 epoch)
- Constellation: Aries
- Right ascension: 02^{h} 37^{m} 52.405^{s}
- Declination: +28° 48′ 08.990″
- Redshift: 1.213000
- Heliocentric radial velocity: 363,648 km/s
- Distance: 8.270 Gly
- Apparent magnitude (V): 19.30

Characteristics
- Type: Blazar, FRSQ

Other designations
- CTD 20, LEDA 2820023, 2E 609, 4FGL J0237.8+2848, OHIO D 258, TXS 0234+285, S1 0234+28, QSO J0237+2848

4C +28.07 is a blazar located in the constellation of Aries. It has a redshift of 1.213 and was first discovered in 1970 as a compact astronomical radio source during an interferometer observation and designated as CTD 20. The radio spectrum of the source is considered flat, making it a flat-spectrum radio quasar. It is one of the brightest blazars observed in the gamma ray energy band.

== Description ==
4C +28.07 is found variable on the electromagnetic spectrum. It is known to show intense gamma ray activity observed by Fermi Large Area Telescope on October 3, 2011. In additional to gamma ray activity, 4C +28.07 also shows near-infrared flares. Between 16 January 2013 and 13 March 2020, four strong gamma ray flares were observed by Fermi LAT, during the Interferometric Monitoring of Gamma-ray Bright Active Galactic Nuclei (iMOGABA) program.

A bright and rapid flare was detected in 4C +28.07 in October 2018. The flare lasted 30 minutes and its gamma ray flux reached a maximum peak of 6.7 ± 0.81 × 10^{−6} photon cm^{−2} s^{−1}. This flux is 31 times higher than the average flux. Furthermore, its spectrum, extended upwards to 316 GeV before hardening beyond 60 GeV.

Multiepoch Very Long Baseline Array (VLBA) radio imaging at 22 GHz, 4C +28.07 shows a radio core and a prominent jet projecting northwards out by 3.5 mas from it, modelled by three main stationary components with one of them showing a complex structure both along it and in transverse direction. There is presence of extended emission and a diffused secondary component.

According to radio band observations by Very Long Baseline Interferometry (VLBI), the jet of 4C +28.07 is described having a one-sided structure on parsec scales. It has a jet speed of (10.11 ± 0.39)c implying superluminal motion and is suggested of a "kink" observed in 3C 273 with the jet jumping sideways and resuming its original position. When observed by Chandra X-ray observatory, the jet shows a sharp bend at a -90° position angle which subsequently terminates at a bright component within 3 mas.

The supermassive black hole in 4C +28.07 is estimated to be 1.65^{+1.66}_{-0.82} × 10^{9} M_{☉} based on an optical spectroscopy conducted on flat-spectrum radio quasars.
