= David Shoemaker (physicist) =

American gravitational-wave scientist

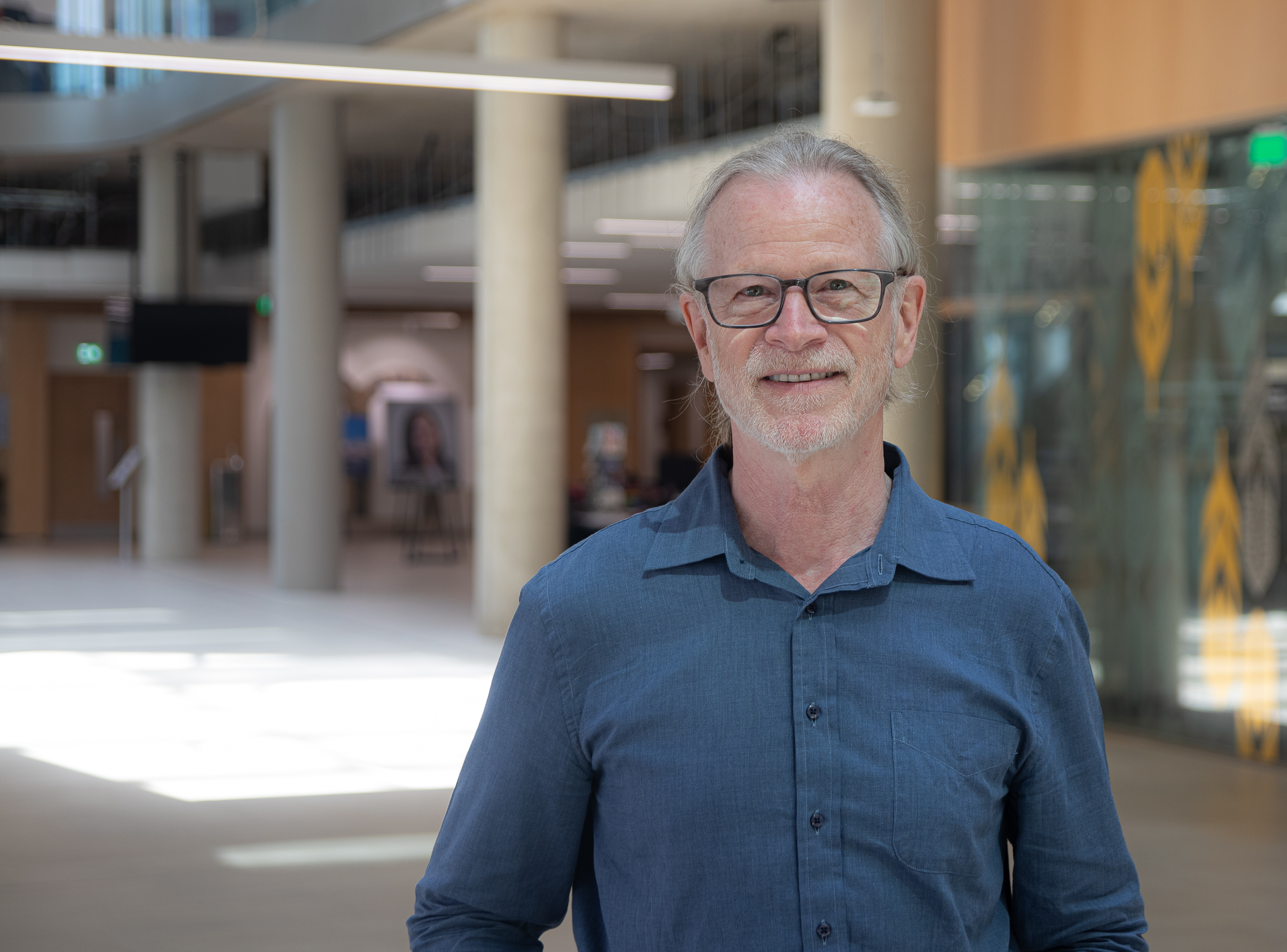

David H. Shoemaker is an American physicist who is a Senior Research Scientist at the MIT Kavli Institute for Astrophysics and Space Research at the Massachusetts Institute of Technology.

Shoemaker graduated from MIT with a Master of Science degree in 1980 having been admitted without an undergraduate degree after working as a Laboratory Instructor in MIT's Physics Department. He received his PhD from Paris-Sud University in 1987. He joined the French National Centre for Scientific Research that year, leaving to work as a research scientist at the Kavli Institute in 1989.

Shoemaker was elected a Fellow of the American Physical Society in 2001. He acted as spokesperson for the LIGO Scientific Collaboration between 2017 and 2019.
