= 2017 Nobel Prizes =

The 2017 Nobel Prizes were awarded by the Nobel Foundation, based in Sweden. Six categories were awarded: Physics, Chemistry, Physiology or Medicine, Literature, Peace, and Economic Sciences.

Nobel Week took place from December 6 to 12, including programming such as lectures, dialogues, and discussions. The award ceremony and banquet for the Peace Prize were scheduled in Oslo on December 10, while the award ceremony and banquet for all other categories were scheduled for the same day in Stockholm.

== Prizes ==
=== Physics ===
Awardee(s)
Rainer Weiss (b. 1932)	American	"for decisive contributions to the LIGO detector and the observation of gravitational waves"
Kip Thorne (b. 1940)	American	"for decisive contributions to the LIGO detector and the observation of gravitational waves"
Barry Barish (b. 1936)	American	"for decisive contributions to the LIGO detector and the observation of gravitational waves"

=== Chemistry ===
Awardee(s)
Jacques Dubochet (b. 1942)	Swiss	"for developing cryo-electron microscopy for the high-resolution structure determination of biomolecules in solution"
Joachim Frank (b. 1940)	German American	"for developing cryo-electron microscopy for the high-resolution structure determination of biomolecules in solution"
Richard Henderson (b. 1945)	British	"for developing cryo-electron microscopy for the high-resolution structure determination of biomolecules in solution"

=== Physiology or Medicine ===
Awardee(s)
Jeffrey C. Hall (b. 1945)	United States	"for their discoveries of molecular mechanisms controlling the circadian rhythm"
Michael Rosbash (b. 1944)	United States	"for their discoveries of molecular mechanisms controlling the circadian rhythm"
Michael W. Young (b. 1949)	United States	"for their discoveries of molecular mechanisms controlling the circadian rhythm"

=== Literature ===
Awardee(s)		
Kazuo Ishiguro (b. 1954)	United Kingdom (born in Japan)	"who, in novels of great emotional force, has uncovered the abyss beneath our illusory sense of connection with the world"

=== Peace ===
Awardee(s)
International Campaign to Abolish Nuclear Weapons (founded 2007)	Switzerland	"for its work to draw attention to the catastrophic humanitarian consequences of any use of nuclear weapons and for its ground-breaking efforts to achieve a treaty-based prohibition of such weapons."

=== Economic Sciences ===
Awardee(s)
Richard Thaler (b. 1945)	United States	"for his contributions to behavioural economics"
