= Gabriela González =

Argentine physicist and Professor at LSU

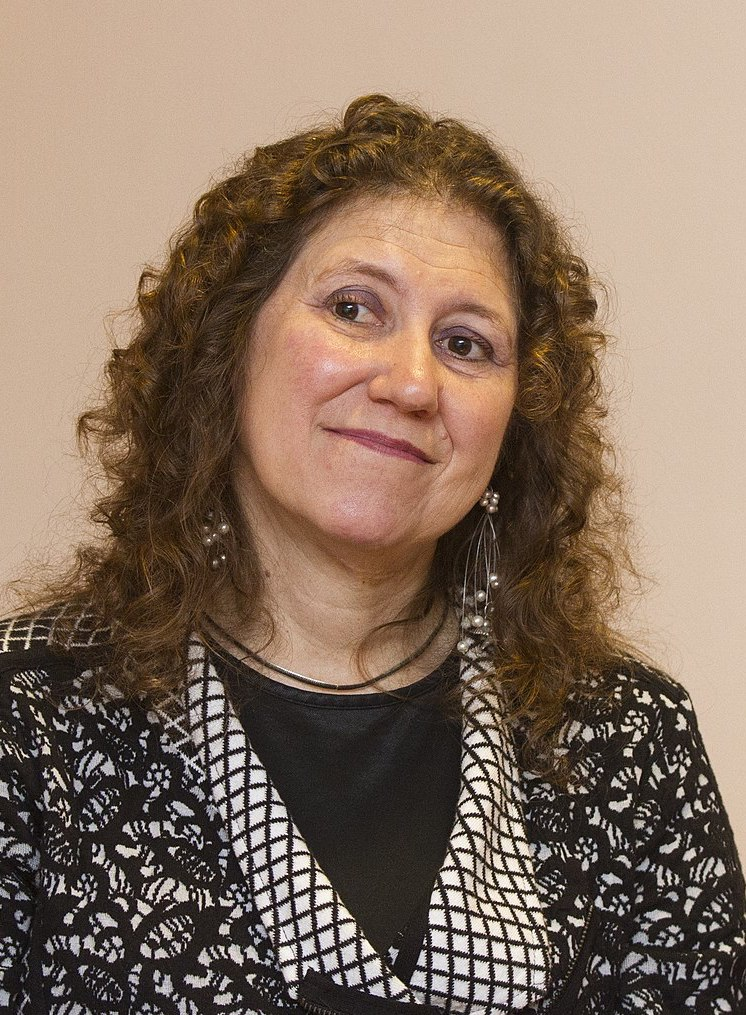
- González in July 2018
- Born: 24 February 1965 (age 61); Córdoba, Argentina
- Education: Syracuse University; National University of Córdoba
- Known for: Gravitational-wave detectors
- Awards: Fellow of the Institute of Physics (2004); Edward A. Bouchet Award (2007); Fellow of the American Physical Society (2007); Bruno Rossi Prize (2017); Petrie Prize Lecture (2019)
- Scientific career
- Fields: Physics
- Workplaces: MIT; Pennsylvania State University; Louisiana State University
- Thesis: Brownian motion of a torsion pendulum damped by internal friction (1995)
- Doctoral advisor: Peter Saulson
- Doctoral students: Anamaria Effler
- Website: www.lsu.edu/physics/people/faculty/gonzalez.php

Gabriela Ines González (born 24 February 1965) is an Argentine professor of physics and astronomy at the Louisiana State University and was the spokesperson for the LIGO Scientific Collaboration from March 2011 until March 2017.

== Biography ==
Gabriela González was born on February 24, 1965, in Córdoba, Argentina. She is the daughter of Dora Trembinsky, a professor of mathematics, and Pedro González, a doctor in Economic Sciences. González completed her primary school studies at the Colegio Luterano Concordia in the city of Córdoba, and her secondary school studies at the Instituto Manuel Lucero. An avid student, González received exemplary grades at school and even had the ability to quickly solve equations in her head.

González attended university at the National University of Córdoba, which she graduated from with a Bachelor's of Science in Physics in 1988. According to González, she began studying physics because she thought of it as a way to answer all of the pressing questions that humanity was faced with. In the end, however, she realized that physics does not answer all these questions but rather face us a species with more.

One year following this, she moved to the United States to study at the Syracuse University, and under the tutelage of Peter Sawlson obtained her doctorate in Physics in 1995. She began a postdoc at MIT, where she later worked as a researcher, and then after that as a professor at Pennsylvania State University. Beginning in April 2001, she began working as a professor at Louisiana State University.

In 2008, González became the first woman to receive a full professorship in the Department of Physics and Astronomy at Louisiana State University.

González believes that science will be much better off when there are as many women as men, and that this will happens when the common myths and misconceptions about physicists, which tend to segregate women from research, start to fall apart, and furthermore when people believe that physicists are simply normal people with normal lives.

Before moving to the United States, González began a relationship with Jorge Pullin, an Argentinian theoretical physicist with specializations in black hole collisions and the theory of quantum gravity working at Louisiana State University. They later wed. The two have no children.

== Career ==
González has published several papers on Brownian motion as a limit to the sensitivity of gravitational-wave detectors, and has an interest in data analysis for gravitational-wave astronomy.

In February 2016, she was one of five LIGO scientists present for the announcement that the first direct gravitational wave observation had been detected in September 2015. (Note: Other physicists present for the announcement were David Reitze, Rainer Weiss, Kip Thorne, and France A. Córdova.) She was a staff scientist in the LIGO group at MIT, joined the faculty at Penn State in 1997 and moved to LSU in 2001. In 2024, González was elected as the vice-president of the American Physical Society, having been a fellow since 2007.

== Awards ==
González was elected fellow of the Institute of Physics (2004), the American Physical Society (2007), and the American Astronomical Society (2020).

She won the Bouchet Award in 2007, the Bruno Rossi Prize in 2017, the National Academy of Sciences Award for Scientific Discovery in 2017, and the Petrie Prize Lecture in 2019.

González was elected to membership in the National Academy of Sciences and the American Academy of Arts and Sciences in 2017.

== Personal life ==
González is married to Jorge Pullin, the Horace Hearne Chair in theoretical Physics at the Louisiana State University.
