= Peter Shawhan =

American physicist

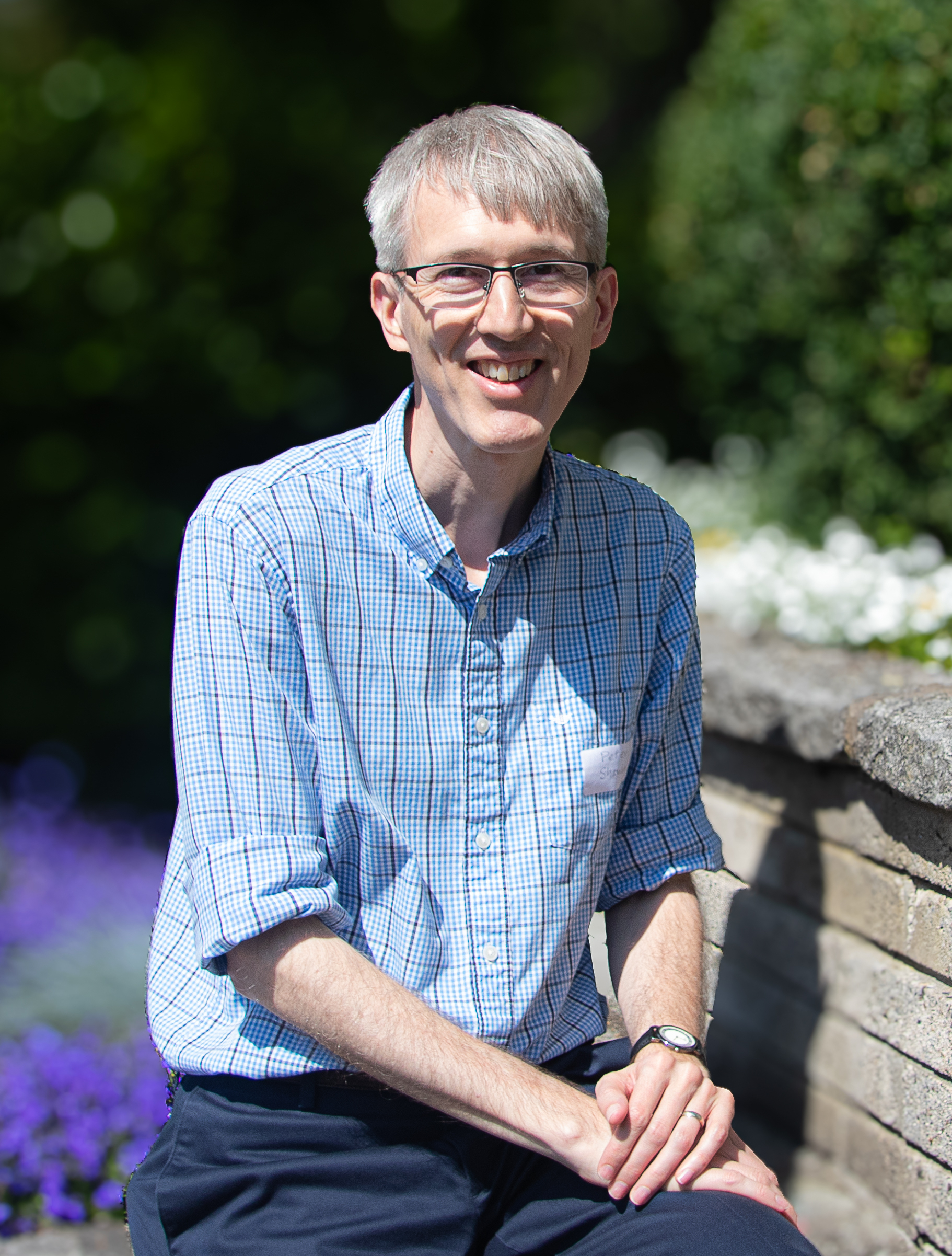
- Education: Washington University in St. Louis; University of Chicago
- Awards: Breakthrough Prize in Fundamental Physics (2016); Gruber Prize in Cosmology (2016); Bruno Rossi Prize (2017); Princess of Asturias Award for Scientific and Technical Research (2017); Fellow, American Physical Society
- Scientific career
- Fields: Physics; Gravitational waves
- Workplaces: Caltech; University of Maryland, College Park
- Doctoral advisor: Bruce Winstein

Peter Shawhan is an American physicist. He is currently professor of physics at the University of Maryland and was a co-recipient of the Breakthrough Prize in Fundamental Physics, the Gruber Prize in Cosmology, and the Bruno Rossi Prize for his work on LIGO.

== Biography ==
Shawhan received his bachelor's degree in physics in 1990 summa cum laude from Washington University in St. Louis, where he was an Arthur Holly Compton Fellow in the Physical Sciences and Mathematics. He was a National Science Foundation Graduate Research Fellow at the University of Chicago, where he received his Ph.D. in 1999 under the supervision of Bruce Winstein. He was then a Millikan Prize Postdoctoral Fellow and a senior scientist at Caltech before becoming professor of physics at the University of Maryland, College Park.

He works on LIGO and is chair of the division of gravitational physics of the American Physical Society.

== Awards ==
- Special Breakthrough Prize in Fundamental Physics (2016)
- Gruber Prize in Cosmology (2016)
- Bruno Rossi Prize (2017)
- Princess of Asturias Award for Scientific and Technical Research
- Kirwan Faculty Research and Scholarship Prize, University of Maryland (2018)
- Fellow, American Physical Society (2019)
