= Hilda Weiss =

German-born American sociologist (1900–1981)

- Born: 29 August 1900; Berlin, Germany
- Died: 29 May 1981 (aged 80); Brooklyn, New York City, US
- Occupation: Sociologist

Hilda Weiss (29 August 1900 – 29 May 1981; alternatively Hilde Weiss, Hilde Rigaudias-Weiss, Hilda Weiss Parker, Hilde Weiß) was a sociologist, trade unionist and socialist. She lived in Germany until 1933, when Adolf Hitler came to power, when she escaped to France. In 1939, she emigrated to the United States and lived there until her death in 1981.

== Early research ==
Weiss was one of the first doctoral students at the Institute for Social Research in Frankfurt, joining in 1924. She wrote her thesis on a comparison of the Zeiss optical factory, based on her personal experiences working there, and the Ford Motor Company in Detroit. Her main interest was in the differential impact of the ideologies of Ernst Karl Abbe, the founder of Zeiss, and Henry Ford.

She describes the challenges of working at Zeiss in her autobiography, where she was the only woman in her department. Initially the men there harassed her:

They told obscene jokes and laughed so maliciously when I could not understand them. But after a little while they found out that I was a member of the union. Then they no longer treated me as a little girl, but talked about labor conditions and union meetings.

== Study of Working Class people in Germany ==
In 1930, Erich Fromm was given responsibility for directing a large empirical survey of workers' conditions in Germany. The survey was "largely carried out" by Weiss and involved distributing questionnaires to 3,300 participants. It is likely that Weiss was influenced by a questionnaire developed by Karl Marx in 1880 which she uncovered whilst working in an archive. Friedman notes that:

Hilde Weiss turned out to be the most valued associate in the undertaking; she was charged with the distribution of the questionnaire and taking the measures necessary to guarantee a high return rate from the respondents. Weiss had studied earlier German survey research ventures, especially Max Weber’s pioneering protocols to solicit data about the social psychology and feelings of German workers. She familiarized Fromm with Weberian survey research approaches.

Smith argues that:

Hilde Weiss is one of the truly neglected figures in the history of the Frankfurt School. But that neglect is inversely proportional to her importance. Weiss was in many ways the principal architect of the workers’ survey, which built on work she had already completed in industrial sociology and laid the foundation for research she would later conduct on Marx and the history of working-class surveys and families. Politically, Weiss was among the most active and astute members of the Institute, and she was better educated in Marxian theory, sociology, and labor studies than Fromm, Horkheimer, or Adorno. She was intimately familiar with trade unions and she had direct, disillusioning experiences of both left-wing and right-wing authoritarianism.

== Escaping Nazi Germany ==
Weiss was Jewish, so with the rise of Nazism it was extremely dangerous for her to stay in Germany. She decided to leave for Switzerland in April 1933. Just before she boarded a train, a dining car waiter recognised her and attracted her attention. It turned out that he had also worked at Zeiss. He helped her to escape, concocting cover stories whenever she was approached by German police (which by then were controlled by the Nazis). She arrived safely in Basel. After a brief time in Geneva, she moved onto Paris. Then, in 1939 at the start of World War II, she escaped to the United States.

== Early and personal life ==
Weiss was born on 29 August 1900, in Berlin. In October 1935, Weiss married Louis Rigaudias, a French Trotskyist leader. They divorced in 1938. She married Joseph P. Parker on 6 April 1955; however, a number of letters suggest this marriage took place in summer 1950. Parker died in a car accident on 6 February 1958, aged 80, in Brooklyn.

== Published works ==
- Weiss, Hilde: Rationalisierung und Arbeiterklasse: Zur Rationalisierung der deutschen Industrie. Berlin: Führer-Verlag 1926.
- Weiss, Hilde: Abbe und Ford: Pläne für die Errichtung sozialer Betriebe. Dissertation. Frankfurt a.M. 1927.
- "My life in Germany before and after January 30, 1933." Autobiographisches Manuskript: Houghton Archive, Harvard University; Folder: bMS Ger 91 (240).
- Rigaudias-Weiss, Hilde: Les Enquêtes Ouvrières en France. Entre 1830 et 1848. Dissertation. Paris: Les Presses Universitaires de France 1936.
- Weiss, Hilde: Die "Enquêtes Ouvrières" von Karl Marx. In: Zeitschrift für Sozialforschung 5, 1936, 76–98. Translated by Maciej Zurowski in Clark McAllister (Ed.). (2022). Karl Marx's Workers’ Inquiry: International History, Reception, and Responses. Notes from Below.
- Weiss, Hilde: Materialien zum Verhältnis von Konjunktur und Familie. Bericht über ein Manuskript von 109 Seiten. In: Horkheimer, M. Fromm, E. Marcuse, H. u.a.: Studien über Autorität und Familie. Paris 1936, 579–581.
- Weiss, Hilda: Human Relations in Industry. From Ernst Abbe to Karl Mannheim. In: The American Journal of Economics and Sociology 8, 1949, 287–297.
- Weiss Parker, Hilda: Industrial Relations, Manipulative or Democratic? In: The American Journal of Economics and Sociology 18, 1958, 25–33.
- Weiss, Hilda P.: Durkheim, Denmark, and Suicide: A Sociological Interpretation of Statistical Data. In: Acta Sociologica 7, 1964, 264–278.

== See also ==
- Rainer Weiss, who is her nephew
