= 2980 Cameron =

Main-belt asteroid

Discovery
- Discovered by: S. J. Bus
- Discovery site: Siding Spring Obs.
- Discovery date: 2 March 1981

Designations
- Named after: Alastair Cameron
- Alternative designations: 1981 EU_{17} · 1977 EL_{3} 1979 SQ_{7}
- Minor planet category: main-belt

Orbital characteristics
- Epoch 4 September 2017 (JD 2458000.5)
- Uncertainty parameter 0
- Observation arc: 39.87 yr (14,564 days)
- Aphelion: 3.0324 AU
- Perihelion: 2.1023 AU
- Semi-major axis: 2.5673 AU
- Eccentricity: 0.1811
- Orbital period (sidereal): 4.11 yr (1,503 days)
- Mean anomaly: 36.213°
- Mean motion: 0° 14^{m} 22.56^{s} / day
- Inclination: 7.2772°
- Longitude of ascending node: 172.24°
- Argument of perihelion: 254.25°

Physical characteristics
- Dimensions: 5.121±0.183
- Geometric albedo: 0.322±0.047
- Absolute magnitude (H): 13.4

2980 Cameron, provisionally designated 1981 EU_{17}, is a main-belt asteroid discovered by prolific American astronomer Schelte Bus at Siding Spring Observatory, Australia, on March 2, 1981. It orbits the Sun every 4.11 years at a distance of 2.1–3.0 AU.

The asteroid was named after astrophysicist and cosmogonist Alastair G. W. Cameron (1925–2005), who was associate director for theoretical astrophysics at the Harvard-Smithsonian Center for Astrophysics. He was an early advocate of the concepts of a turbulent accretion disk solar nebula, and of the origin of the Moon by a giant impact on the proto-Earth. He also studied the nucleosynthesis in stars and supernovae, and the cosmic abundances of nuclides.
