= Petrie Prize Lecture =

Award given every other year to an outstanding astrophysicist

The Petrie Prize Lecture is an award given in alternate years by the Canadian Astronomical Society to an outstanding astrophysicist. The award commemorates the contributions to astrophysical research of the Canadian astronomer Robert M. Petrie.

== Prize Winners ==
Source: Canadian Astronomical Society

- 1970 Alastair G. W. Cameron
- 1971 Jesse Leonard Greenstein
- 1971 Carlyle Smith Beals
- 1977 J. Beverley Oke
- 1979 Geoffrey Burbidge
- 1981 Hubert Reeves
- 1983 M. J. Plavec
- 1985 Charles Hard Townes
- 1987 Henry Matthews
- 1989 James Peebles
- 1991 Peter B. Stetson
- 1993 Maarten Schmidt
- 1995 George Howard Herbig
- 1997 Alexei Filippenko
- 1999 Sidney van den Bergh
- 2001 James E. Gunn
- 2003 Martin Rees
- 2005 Reinhard Genzel
- 2007 Ewine van Dishoeck
- 2009 Scott Tremaine
- 2011 Andrew Fabian
- 2013 Françoise Combes
- 2015 Wendy Freedman
- 2017 Charles A. Beichman
- 2019 Gabriela Gonzalez
- 2021 Heino Falcke
- 2023 You-Hua Chu

== See also ==
- List of astronomy awards
