= Alastair G. W. Cameron =

Canadian astrophysicist (1925–2005)

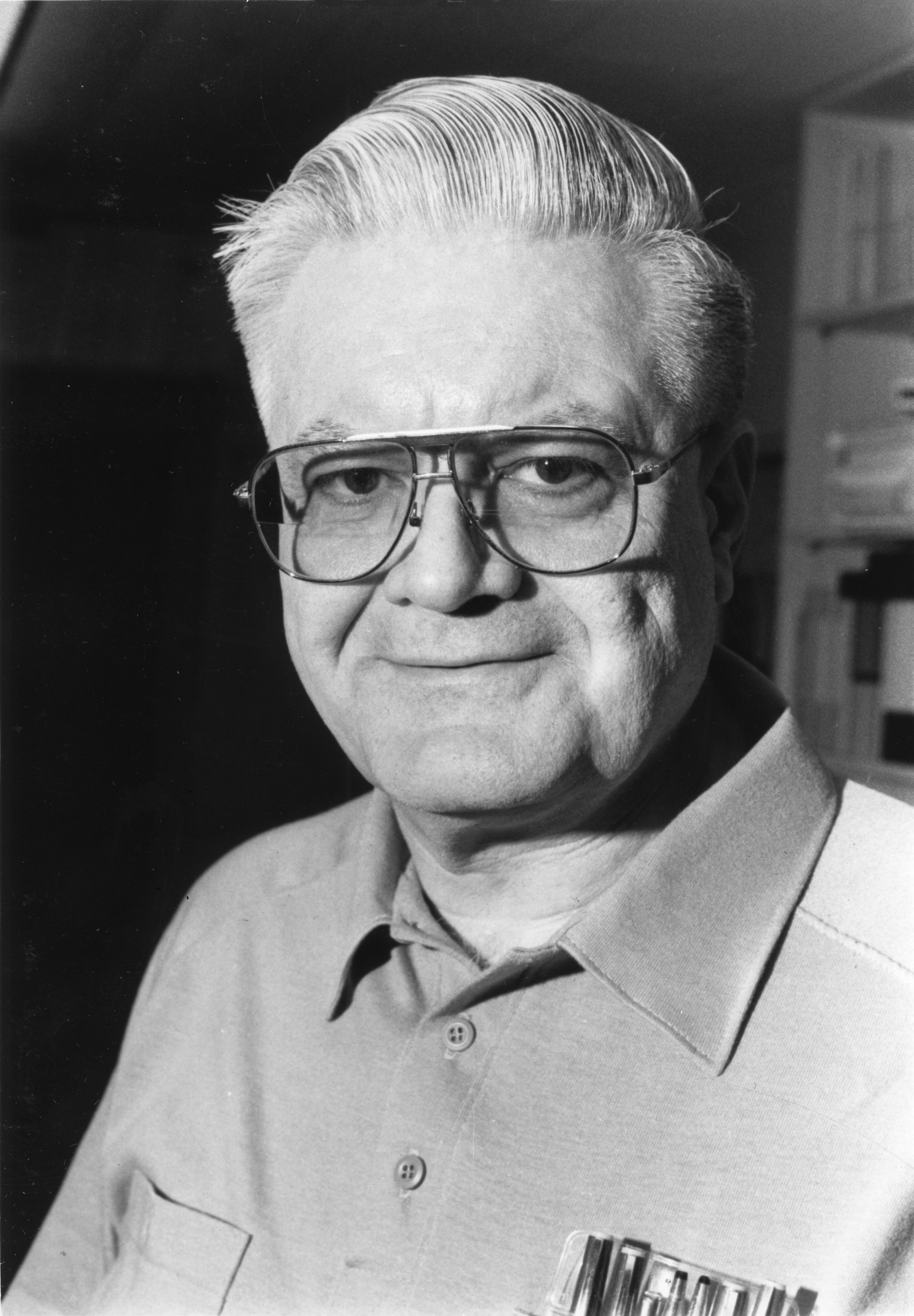
- Born: 21 June 1925; Winnipeg, Manitoba, Canada
- Died: 3 October 2005 (aged 80); Tucson, Arizona, United States
- Citizenship: Canadian, American
- Education: University of Manitoba, University of Saskatchewan
- Known for: r-process, stellar nucleosynthesis
- Awards: Petrie Prize Lecture (1970); Hans Bethe Prize (2006)
- Scientific career
- Workplaces: Caltech, Goddard Institute for Space Studies, Yeshiva University, Harvard University
- Doctoral advisor: Leon Katz

Alastair Graham Walter Cameron (21 June 1925 – 3 October 2005) was an American–Canadian astrophysicist and space scientist who was an eminent staff member of the Astronomy department of Harvard University. He was one of the founders of the field of nuclear astrophysics, advanced the theory that the Moon was created by the giant impact of a Mars-sized object with the early Earth, and was an early adopter of computer technology in astrophysics.

== Early life and education ==
Alastair Cameron was born in Winnipeg, Manitoba, to parents of Scottish descent. His father, born in London, England, was chemist A.T. Cameron, a professor and chair of the biochemistry department at Manitoba Medical College. He recalls addressing all men as “Doctor” as a four-year-old, noting it was "clearly an early attempt at forming a hypothesis based on limited data."

In 1940 (When Cameron was only 15 years old), he made a bet with a high school classmate that man would land on the Moon within 40 years. When the Apollo program achieved a successful Moon landing in 1969, the former classmate sent a cheque to settle the bet, which Cameron had framed and hung on the wall in his office.

Cameron earned a Bachelor of Science degree from the University of Manitoba in Physics and Mathematics. During the summers, he worked at the Chalk River Laboratory, a Canadian research facility on Ontario. He went on to do graduate work in both theoretical and experimental nuclear physics at the University of Saskatchewan. Under the supervision of Leon Katz, he studied photonuclear cross sections using the university's new 25 MeV betatron accelerator. In 1952, earned the first PhD awarded in physics from the university.

== Career ==
After finishing his PhD, he spent two years as an assistant professor at the Iowa State College and worked at the Ames Laboratory at the university, which was run by the United States Atomic Energy Commission. There he taught nuclear physics and helped to increase the electron beam current in the facility's new 70-MeV synchrotron particle accelerator.

While at the Ames lab, he read an article in Science News Letter magazine (now Science News), about the detection of the element technetium in the variable star R Andromedae and other red variable stars by the American astronomer Paul Merrill. Since this element has no stable isotopes, the observed technetium would experience radioactive decay with half-life of about 200,000 years, which was much shorter than the lifetime of the star. Cameron realized that this meant the technetium must have formed inside the stars where it was observed, by bombarding other elements with neutrons. Excited by this clue to the astrophysical origins of heavy elements, Cameron decided to switch fields study astrophysics. Having never taken an astronomy class, he purchased several graduate-level textbooks, subscribed to the Astrophysical Journal, and began an intense period of self-study.

=== Stellar nucleosynthesis ===
Cameron returned to Canada in 1954, taking a position at the Chalk River Laboratory operated by Atomic Energy of Canada Limited. There he hoped to apply advances from the rapidly developing field of nuclear physics to the field of astrophysics. In particular, he wished to calculate the nuclear cross sections involved in helium fusion reactions inside the cores of red giant stars, which could produce the neutrons necessary to produce the technetium observed by Merrill. He quickly realized that traditional computational methods and slide rules were insufficient to calculate complex networks of nuclear reactions. He used of some of the first computers in Canada, originally purchased for use by the accounting department at the laboratory, to do the calculations. At first, he was able to give programs on trays of punch cards to the accountants to run on his behalf. However, as his calculations increased in sophistication and the computing resources at Chalk River improved, he switched to work during the night and on weekends when the machines were not in use.

In 1957, he published Nuclear Reactions in Stars and Nucleogenesis, known as the AGWC paper, which introduced an important, early, comprehensive theory of the production of chemical elements in stars, especially r-process elements. This work by Cameron, along with the B^{2}FH paper (published in the same year by Margaret Burbidge, Geoffrey Burbidge, William A. Fowler, and Fred Hoyle), helped to publicise and direct research in the field of nuclear astrophysics.

In 1959, after growing frustrated with what he saw as the Canadian government's lack of interest in investing in science, Cameron emigrated to the United States, which had just seen a major expansion of funding for space-science research due to the Sputnik crisis. He held academic positions at the California Institute of Technology, the Goddard Institute for Space Studies, and at Yeshiva University. In 1973 he became a professor of astronomy at Harvard University and remained there for 26 years. From 1976 to 1982 he was chairman of the Space Science Board of the National Academy of Sciences.

Five days before his death in 2005, the 2006 Bethe Prize for his work on nuclear astrophysics was announced. Cameron would receive this award for his 50-year-old work on stellar nucleosynthesis, which was still an area of active research.

=== Formation of the Solar System ===
After learning about the 1960 discovery of an excess of xenon-129 due to the radioactive decay of iodine-129 in the Richardton meteorite, Cameron became interested in what the abundances of radioactive isotopes can tell us about the formation of the Solar System and the interstellar medium. In 1975, he gave a seminar at Caltech, titled The Origin of the Solar System, where he outlined a unified model of the formation of the Solar System, from the Sun's formation from the collapse of cloud of gas and dust, the subsequent formation of a protoplanetary disk, to the formation of the gas giants and the terrestrial planets out of material from the disk. When an audience member asked, “What did you do on the seventh day?” he reportedly responded, “I rested.”

=== Formation of the Moon ===
Samples brought back from the Apollo program showed that the Moon was composed of the same material as the mantle of the Earth. This surprising result was still unexplained in the early 1970s, when Cameron began work on an explanation of the Moon's origins. He theorized that the formation of the Moon was the result of a tangential impact of an object at least the size of Mars on the early Earth. In this model, the outer silicates of the body hitting the Earth would be vaporized, whereas a metallic core would not. The more volatile materials that were emitted during the collision would escape the Solar System, whereas silicates would tend to coalesce. Hence, most of the collisional material sent into orbit would consist of silicates, leaving the coalescing Moon deficient in iron and volatile materials, such as water.

After seeing William Hartmann present a similar, independent model at a conference in 1974, Cameron began a several decade-long collaboration with Hartmann to develop the giant-impact hypothesis. Cameron was able to use increasingly sophisticated computer models to show that such a collision could produce an Earth-Moon system with the correct mass, spin, and orbital momentum. The giant-impact theory gained mainstream acceptance as the scientific explanation for the origin of the Moon beginning in the 1980s.

After his retirement from Harvard in 1999, Cameron held a position at the Lunar and Planetary Laboratory of the University of Arizona.

== Awards and recognition ==
- 1961 Fellow of the Royal Society of Canada
- 1970 R.M. Petrie Prize Lecture Award of the Canadian Astronomical Society
- 1972 Fellow of the American Physical Society
- 1976 Member of the National Academy of Sciences
- 1983 NASA Distinguished Public Service Medal
- 1988 J. Lawrence Smith Medal of the National Academy of Sciences
- 1989 Harry H. Hess Medal of the American Geophysical Union
- 1994 Leonard Medal of the Meteoritical Society
- 1997 Henry Norris Russell Lectureship of the American Astronomical Society
- 2006 Hans Bethe Prize of the American Physical Society

== Personal life ==
Cameron married Elizabeth MacMillan in 1955. She died in 2001.

While Cameron became a naturalized United States citizen in 1963 in order to receive the security clearances necessary to work in the US space program, he frequently returned to visit his native Canada and remained active in Canadian politics throughout his life.

Cameron died on October 3, 2005, from heart failure. He was 80 years old.

== See also ==
- 2980 Cameron
