= John Beverley Oke =

John Beverley Oke (23 March 1928 – 2 March 2004) was an astronomer and professor of astronomy at Caltech. He worked in astronomical photometry and spectroscopy and is well known for creating instruments for the detection and measurement of cosmic phenomena. His instruments were used on the 200 inches (5.1 m) Hale Telescope at Mount Palomar, California and the Keck telescope on Mauna Kea, Hawaii. "He was one of the first really serious and really excellent astronomer-instrumentalists," says James E. Gunn, Eugene Higgins Professor of Astronomy at Princeton University Observatory, "and he and the instruments he designed and built were very largely responsible for keeping Palomar and the 200-inch telescope so far ahead of the rest of the world during the 1960s, 1970s, and 1980s."

Oke earned his Ph.D. from Princeton University in 1953. His work and instruments contributed to the 1963 discovery that quasar 3C 273 was receding from Earth at one sixth the speed of light. Awarded the Petrie Prize Lecture in 1977.
