= Peter Saulson =

American physicist and professor at Syracuse University

Peter R. Saulson
- Born: October 30, 1954 (age 71); Baltimore, Maryland
- Education: Princeton University; Harvard University
- Known for: LIGO collaboration and research on gravitational wave detectors
- Awards: Fellow of American Physical Society (2003); National Academy of Sciences Award for Scientific Discovery (2016)
- Scientific career
- Institutions: Syracuse University; MIT
- Thesis: Optical and Infrared Search for Massive Halos of Galaxies (1981)
- Doctoral advisor: David Todd Wilkinson
- Doctoral students: Gabriela González
- Website: thecollege.syr.edu/people/faculty/saulson-peter-r/

Peter Reed Saulson (born October 30, 1954) is an American physicist and professor at Syracuse University. He is best known as a former spokesperson for the LIGO collaboration serving from 2003 to 2007 and research on gravitational wave detectors.

== Education ==
Saulson was born October 30, 1954, in Baltimore, Maryland, into a Jewish family. studied physics at Harvard University where he earned a bachelor's degree (magna cum laude) in 1976. He later studied at Princeton University where he received a master's degree in 1978 and a doctorate in 1981. He was then a post-doctoral scholar at the Massachusetts Institute of Technology, where he started in 1985 and worked as principal research scientist until 1989. In 1989 he was a visiting scientist at the Joint Institute for Laboratory Astrophysics in Boulder, Colorado.

== Career ==
Saulson is Martin A. Pomerantz '37 Professor of Physics at Syracuse University where he co-leads the Gravitational-Wave Astronomy Group. He was associate professor there from 1991 to 1999 and head of the physics department from 2010 to 2013. In 2000–01, he was a visiting professor at Louisiana State University and in 2000 Interferometer Commissioning Leader at LIGO and Caltech.

Saulson was the first elected speaker of the LIGO Scientific Collaboration, succeeding LIGO co-founder Rainer Weiss.

== Awards and honors ==
Saulson was named a fellow of the American Physical Society in 2003 for "his contributions to experimental gravitational physics including pioneering studies of thermal mechanisms affecting interferometer performance and for his educational contributions including authoring one of the most influential books in the field." He was named Syracuse University's 2003-04 University Scholar/Teacher of the Year.

In 2016 he received the National Academy of Sciences Award for Scientific Discovery with Gabriela González, his former PhD student, and David Reitze.

In 2026, he was elected to the National Academy of Sciences.

== Works ==
- Saulson, Peter R. (October 1994). Fundamentals of Interferometric Gravitational Wave Detectors. Singapore: World Scientific. Bibcode:1994figw.book.....S. doi:10.1142/2410. ISBN 9789810218201. OCLC 468289327.
- Advanced Interferometric Gravitational-wave Detectors (In 2 Volumes). World Scientific. 2019. ISBN 9789813146099. OCLC 953843905.
- Physics of Gravitational Wave Detection: Resonant and Interferometric Detectors (PDF). XXVI SLAC Summer Institute on Particle Physics. Stanford. 1998.
- González, Gabriela I.; Saulson, Peter R. (May 1995). "Brownian motion of a torsion pendulum with internal friction". Physics Letters A. 201 (1): 12–18. Bibcode:1995PhLA..201...12G. doi:10.1016/0375-9601(95)00194-8. ISSN 0375-9601.
- Saulson, Peter R. (June 1997). "If light waves are stretched by gravitational waves, how can we use light as a ruler to detect gravitational waves?". American Journal of Physics. 65 (6): 501–505. Bibcode:1997AmJPh..65..501S. doi:10.1119/1.18578.
