= Anamaria Effler =

Romanian-American physicist

Anamaria Effler is a Romanian and American physicist who studies gravitational waves as a scientist in the LIGO experiment at Livingston, Louisiana. Her work at LIGO involves tracking down and removing sources of noise in the LIGO gravity wave detector.

== Early life and education ==
Effler is originally from Arad, Romania. She was a high school student at Moise Nicoară National College, during which she competed in the national physics olympiads. After graduating in 2003, she did her undergraduate studies at the California Institute of Technology, participating in two Summer Undergraduate Research Fellowships at LIGO and receiving a bachelor's degree in 2006. After working for the LIGO at its Hanford Site as an operations specialist for three years, she began doctoral studies in physics at Louisiana State University in 2009, choosing it as "the closest school to a LIGO site". She completed her Ph.D. in 2014. Her dissertation, Performance Characterization of the Dual-Recycled Michelson Subsystem in Advanced LIGO, was supervised by Gabriela González; she also cites LIGO scientist Valera Frolov as a mentor. She continued at LIGO, initially as a Caltech postdoctoral researcher.

== Recognition ==
Effler was named as a Fellow of the American Physical Society in 2025, after a nomination from the APS Division of Gravitational Physics, "for key contributions to the performance of the LIGO gravitational wave detectors".
