= Bruce Winstein =

Physicist

- Born: September 25, 1943; Los Angeles
- Died: February 28, 2011 (aged 67)
- Education: UCLA
- Alma mater: Caltech
- Awards: W.K.H. Panofsky Prize in Experimental Particle Physics
- Scientific career
- Fields: Experimental physics and cosmology
- Institutions: Princeton, University of Chicago, Fermilab

Bruce Winstein (September 25, 1943, Los Angeles – February 28, 2011) was an experimental physicist and cosmologist noted for his early work in elementary particle physics, particularly work toward demonstrating a serious asymmetry between particles and their anti-particles (CP violation). Later in his career, he worked in experimental cosmology, measuring polarization in the microwave background radiation whose properties date back to the early universe.

== Career ==
After a distinguished early career in experimental elementary particle physics, Winstein spent a year in Princeton as a Guggenheim Fellow, studying astrophysics in general and the microwave background radiation in particular. He then returned to his position as the Samuel K. Alison Distinguished Service Professor in Physics at the University of Chicago, where he founded its NSF Physics Frontier Center for Cosmological Physics.

In 1999, he was leader of Fermilab's KTeV experiment, which produced the first definitive evidence for direct CP violation, an important proof that matter and anti-matter are not perfect twins. He was also leader of the QUIET experiment, a multi-year international collaboration that sought to detect gravity waves in the early universe by measuring polarization in the microwave background radiation.

He received his B.S. degree in Physics and Math from UCLA and his Ph.D. in 1970 from Caltech.

Winstein was a Guggenheim Fellow since 1999 and in 2003 became a Fellow of the American Association for the Advancement of Science.

Winstein was inducted into the National Academy of Sciences in 1995 and into the American Academy of Arts and Sciences in 2007. Also in 2007, he was awarded the W.H. Panofsky Prize in Experimental Particle Physics by the American Physical Society.

== Honors ==
Winstein was a member of both the National Academy of Sciences and the American Academy of Arts and Sciences. In 2007, the American Physical Society awarded him its W.K.H. Panofsky Prize in Experimental Particle Physics, with the following citation: "For leadership in the series of experiments that resulted in a multitude of precision measurements of properties of neutral K mesons, most notably the discovery of direct CP violation."
