= Rainer Weiss =

American physicist (1932–2025)

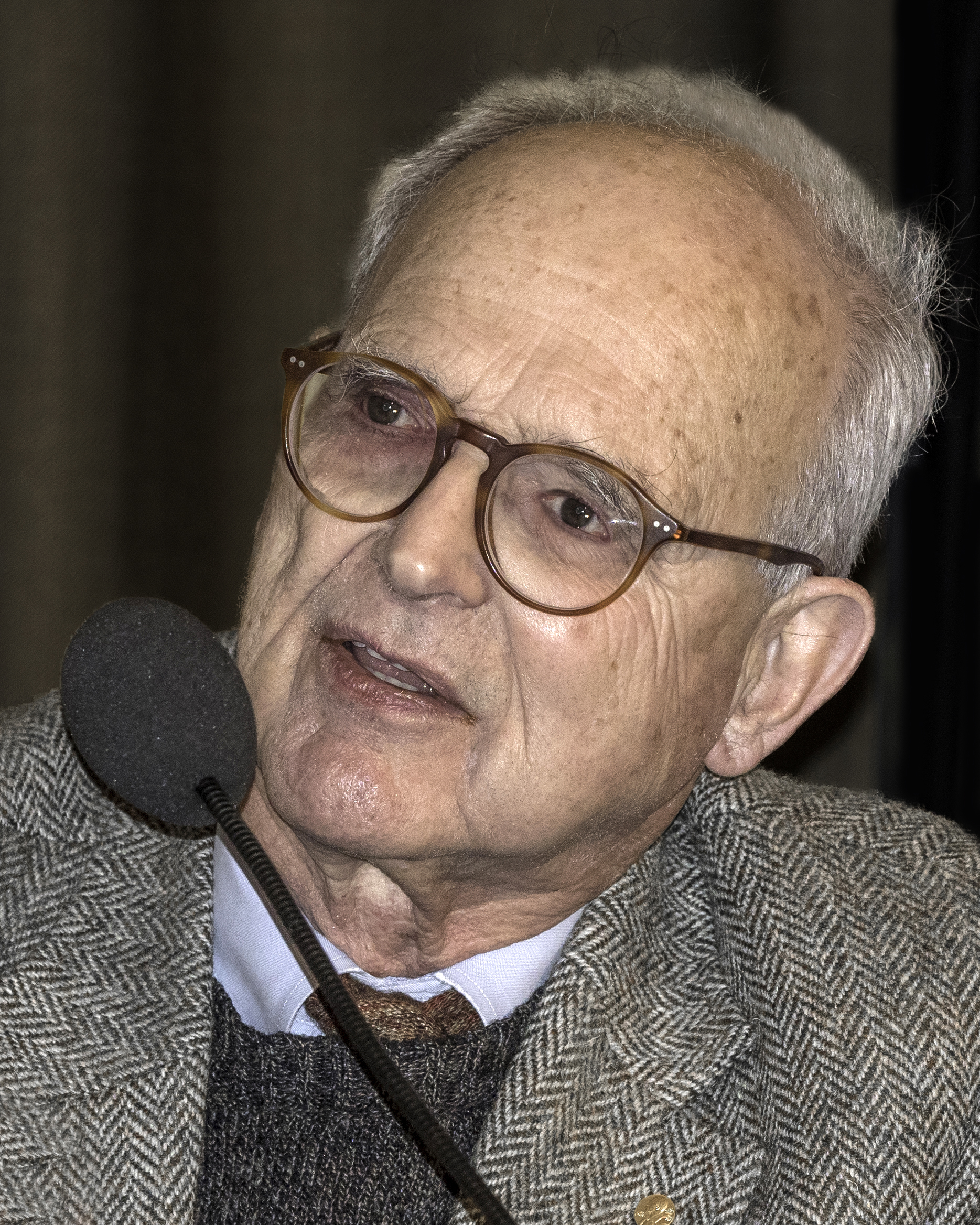
- Weiss in 2017
- Born: September 29, 1932; Berlin, Germany
- Died: August 25, 2025 (aged 92); Cambridge, Massachusetts, U.S.
- Education: Massachusetts Institute of Technology (BS, PhD)
- Known for: Pioneering laser interferometric gravitational wave observation
- Spouse: Rebecca Young (m. 1959)
- Children: 2
- Awards: Einstein Prize (2007); Special Breakthrough Prize in Fundamental Physics (2016); Gruber Prize in Cosmology (2016); Shaw Prize (2016); Kavli Prize (2016); Harvey Prize (2016); Princess of Asturias Award (2017); Nobel Prize in Physics (2017)
- Scientific career
- Fields: Physics; Laser physics; Experimental gravitation; Cosmic background measurements
- Institutions: Massachusetts Institute of Technology; Princeton University; Tufts University
- Thesis: Stark Effect and Hyperfine Structure of Hydrogen Fluoride (1962)
- Doctoral advisor: Jerrold R. Zacharias
- Doctoral students: Nergis Mavalvala; Philip K. Chapman; Rana X. Adhikari
- Other notable students: Bruce Allen; Sarah Veatch

Rainer Weiss (/waɪs/ WYSSE, German: [vaɪs]; September 29, 1932 – August 25, 2025) was a German-American physicist, known for his contributions in gravitational physics and astrophysics. He was a professor of physics at the Massachusetts Institute of Technology and an adjunct professor at Louisiana State University. He is best known for inventing the laser interferometric technique which is the basic operation of LIGO. He was Chair of the COBE Science Working Group.

In 2017, Weiss was awarded the Nobel Prize in Physics, along with Kip Thorne and Barry Barish, "for decisive contributions to the LIGO detector and the observation of gravitational waves".

Weiss helped realize a number of challenging experimental tests of fundamental physics. He was a member of the Fermilab Holometer experiment, which uses a 40m laser interferometer to measure properties of space and time at quantum scale and provide Planck-precision tests of quantum holographic fluctuation.

== Early life and education ==
Rainer Weiss was born in Berlin, Brandenburg, Prussia, Germany, on September 29, 1932, the son of Gertrude Loesner and Frederick A. Weiss. His father, a physician, neurologist, and psychoanalyst, was forced out of Germany by Nazis because he was Jewish and an active member of the Communist Party. His mother, an actress, was Christian. His aunt was the sociologist Hilda Weiss. His younger sister is playwright Sybille Pearson.

The family fled first to Prague, but Germany's occupation of Czechoslovakia after the 1938 Munich Agreement caused them to flee again; the philanthropic Stix family of St. Louis helped them obtain visas to enter the United States. Weiss spent his youth in New York City, where he attended Columbia Grammar School.

He studied at MIT, dropping out at the beginning of his junior year with the excuse that he had abandoned his coursework to pursue a romantic relationship with a music student from Chicago. While this affair was a contributing factor, Weiss's concurrent vacillation between MIT's engineering and physics tracks may also have played a significant role. Jerrold Zacharias, then an influential physicist and MIT professor, intervened, and Weiss, after working as a technician in Zacharias's lab, eventually returned to receive his S.B. degree in 1955. He would complete his PhD in 1962, still with Zacharias as advisor/mentor.

== Career ==
Weiss taught at Tufts University from 1960 to 1962, was a postdoctoral scholar at Princeton University from 1962 to 1964, and then joined the faculty at MIT in 1964 starting a new research group in the Research Laboratory of Electronics dedicated to research in cosmology and gravitation.

For Weiss's initial work at MIT, he started a group studying cosmology and gravitation. Needing to develop new technology, particularly in regards to the stabilization of equipment set to measure minute fluctuations, his lab included machine and electronics shop, with a hands-on expectation of his students for fabrication and design.

By 1966, Weiss's tenure at MIT was at risk because of the failure of his group to produce publications. On advice from Bernard Burke, then head of the division on astrophysics in the Physics Department, Weiss recalibrated his standards for submitting articles for publication, eventually finding grounds for publication that he believed met his personal standards as scientifically worthy and publishable. He was then able to qualify for tenure and remain at MIT.

That same year Joseph Weber claimed to have invented a way to detect gravitational waves. When Weiss's students asked him about Weber's work, he was unable to explain it to them, as it seemed to contradict his understanding of general relativity. In 1967, to illustrate the principle of gravitational wave detection in a simpler way, Weiss devised a thought experiment involving time of flight measurements of light between free masses in space, which in principle required "impossibly precise clocks". About a year later, as Weber's claims remained unconfirmed, Weiss started to realize that maybe Weber was wrong. He eventually revisited his idea and replaced the clocks with laser interferometry and concluded that such an approach could realistically detect gravitational waves, at sensitivities beyond what Weber's resonant bars could achieve.

=== Vietnam Era cuts to science grants ===
In 1973, Weiss was forced to pivot with his work as the US military cut funding for any science that was not determined to be "directly relevant to its core mission." Weiss wrote a proposal to the NSF that described "a new way to measure gravitational waves." This was the work that would eventually lead to his 2017 Nobel Prize, though it was many years before the interferometers Weiss and his students built were sensitive enough to actually detect gravitational waves, making for numerous unpleasant doctoral thesis defenses where Weiss's graduate students were unable to present positive (in layman's terms: any) results.

=== MIT/Caltech collaboration ===
Weiss proposed the concept of LIGO to Kip Thorne in 1972, but it took three years before Thorne was convinced it could work. After the study of prototypes at MIT, Caltech, Garching, and Glasgow, and Weiss's estimates what it would take to build a full scale interferometer, Caltech and MIT signed an agreement about the design and construction of LIGO in 1984, with joint leadership by Ronald Drever, Weiss, and Thorne.

In a 2022 interview given to Federal University of Pará in Brazil, Weiss talks about his life and career, the memories of his childhood and youth, his undergraduate and graduate studies at MIT, and the future of gravitational waves astronomy.

== Achievements ==
Weiss brought two fields of fundamental physics research from birth to maturity: characterization of the cosmic background radiation, and interferometric gravitational wave observation.

In 1973 he made pioneering measurements of the spectrum of the cosmic microwave background radiation, taken from a weather balloon, showing that the microwave background exhibited the thermal spectrum characteristic of the remnant radiation from the Big Bang. He later became co-founder and science advisor of the NASA Cosmic Background Explorer (COBE) satellite, which made detailed mapping of the radiation.

Weiss also pioneered the concept of using lasers for an interferometric gravitational wave detector, suggesting that the path length required for such a detector would necessitate kilometer-scale arms. He built a prototype in the 1970s, following earlier work by Robert L. Forward. He co-founded the NSF LIGO (gravitational-wave detection) project, which was based on his report "A study of a long Baseline Gravitational Wave Antenna System".

Both of these efforts couple challenges in instrument science with physics important to the understanding of the Universe.

In February 2016, he was one of the four scientists of the LIGO/Virgo collaboration presenting at the press conference for the announcement that the first direct gravitational wave observation had been made in September 2015. (Note: Other physicists presenting were Gabriela González, David Reitze, Kip Thorne, and France A. Córdova from the NSF.)

Kip Thorne described Weiss as "by a large margin, the most influential person this field [the study of gravitational waves] has seen."

According the Nobel Prize website, Weiss received one half of the 2017 Nobel Prize for Physics prize money share, while his LIGO colleagues and co-winners Barry Barish and Kip Thorne only received one quarter of it.

== Personal life and death ==
Classical music was reportedly an influence and shaping force in Weiss's life, from his early youth in an immigrant family, through his shared love of Beethoven's Spring Sonata, which cemented his deep personal relationship with mentor Jerrold Zacharias.

He married and had his first child while still in graduate school, "the best time of my life." He was married to Rebecca Young from 1959 until his death, and they had two children.

Weiss died at a hospital in Cambridge, Massachusetts, on August 25, 2025, at the age of 92.

== Honors and awards ==
Weiss has been recognized by numerous awards including:

- In 2006, with John C. Mather, he and the COBE team received the Gruber Prize in Cosmology.
- In 2007, with Ronald Drever, he was awarded the APS Einstein Prize for his work.
- In 2016 and 2017, for the achievement of gravitational waves detection, he received:

- The Special Breakthrough Prize in Fundamental Physics,
- Gruber Prize in Cosmology,
- Shaw Prize,
- Kavli Prize in Astrophysics
- The Harvey Prize together with Kip Thorne and Ronald Drever.
- The Smithsonian magazine's American Ingenuity Award in the Physical Science category, with Kip Thorne and Barry Barish.
- The Willis E. Lamb Award for Laser Science and Quantum Optics, 2017.
- The Cocconi Prize (2017) of the European Physical Society (jointly with Kip Thorne and Barry Barish).
- Princess of Asturias Award (2017) (jointly with Kip Thorne and Barry Barish).
- The Nobel Prize in Physics (2017) (jointly with Kip Thorne and Barry Barish)
- Fellowship of the Norwegian Academy of Science and Letters

- In 2018, he was awarded the American Astronomical Society's Joseph Weber Award for Astronomical Instrumentation "for his invention of the interferometric gravitational-wave detector, which led to the first detection of long-predicted gravitational waves."
- In 2020 he was elected a Legacy Fellow of the American Astronomical Society.

== Selected publications ==
- Weiss, R.; Stroke, H.H.; Jaccarino, V.; Edmonds, D.S. (1957). "Magnetic Moments and Hyperfine Structures Anomalies of Cs_{133}, Cs_{135} and Cs_{137}". Phys. Rev. 105 (2): 590–603. Bibcode:1957PhRv..105..590S. doi:10.1103/PhysRev.105.590.
- R. Weiss (1961). "Molecular Beam Electron Bombardment Detector". Rev. Sci. Instrum. 32 (4): 397–401. Bibcode:1961RScI...32..397W. doi:10.1063/1.1717386.
- R. Weiss & L. Grodzins (1962). "A Search for a Frequency Shift of 14.4 keV Photons on Traversing Radiation Fields". Physics Letters. 1 (8): 342. Bibcode:1962PhL.....1..342W. doi:10.1016/0031-9163(62)90420-1.
- Weiss, Rainer (1963). "Stark Effect and Hyperfine Structure of Hydrogen Fluoride". Phys. Rev. 131 (2): 659–665. Bibcode:1963PhRv..131..659W. doi:10.1103/PhysRev.131.659.
- R. Weiss & B. Block (1965). "A Gravimeter to Monitor the _{O}S_{O} Dilational Model of the Earth". J. Geophys. Res. 70 (22): 5615. Bibcode:1965JGR....70.5615W. doi:10.1029/JZ070i022p05615.
- R. Weiss & G. Blum (1967). "Experimental Test of the Freundlich Red-Shift Hypothesis". Phys. Rev. 155 (5): 1412. Bibcode:1967PhRv..155.1412B. doi:10.1103/PhysRev.155.1412.
- R. Weiss (1967). "Electric and Magnetic Field Probes". Am. J. Phys. 35 (11): 1047–1048. Bibcode:1967AmJPh..35.1047W. doi:10.1119/1.1973723.
- R.Weiss and S. Ezekiel (1968). "Laser-Induced Fluorescence in a Molecular Beam of Iodine". Phys. Rev. Lett. 20 (3): 91–93. Bibcode:1968PhRvL..20...91E. doi:10.1103/PhysRevLett.20.91.
- R. Weiss & D. Muehlner (1970). "A Measurement of the Isotropic Background Radiation in the Far Infrared". Phys. Rev. Lett. 24 (13): 742. Bibcode:1970PhRvL..24..742M. doi:10.1103/PhysRevLett.24.742.
- R. Weiss (1972). "Electromagnetically Coupled Broadband Gravitational Antenna" (PDF). Quarterly Progress Report, Research Laboratory of Electronics, MIT. 105: 54. Archived (PDF) from the original on March 8, 2016.
- R. Weiss & D. Muehlner (1973). "Balloon Measurements of the Far Infrared Background Radiation". Phys. Rev. D. 7 (2): 326. Bibcode:1973PhRvD...7..326M. doi:10.1103/PhysRevD.7.326.
- R. Weiss & D. Muehlner (1973). "Further Measurements of the Submillimeter Background at Balloon Altitude". Phys. Rev. Lett. 30 (16): 757. Bibcode:1973PhRvL..30..757M. doi:10.1103/PhysRevLett.30.757.
- R. Weiss & D.K. Owens (1974). "Measurements of the Phase Fluctuations on a He-Ne Zeeman Laser". Rev. Sci. Instrum. 45 (9): 1060. Bibcode:1974RScI...45.1060O. doi:10.1063/1.1686809.
- R. Weiss, D.K. Owens & D. Muehlner (1979). "A Large Beam Sky Survey at Millimeter and Submillimeter Wavelengths Made from Balloon Altitudes". Astrophysical Journal. 231: 702. Bibcode:1979ApJ...231..702O. doi:10.1086/157235.
- Weiss, R.; Downey, P.M.; Bachner, F.J.; Donnelly, J.P.; Lindley, W.T.; Mountain, R.W.; Silversmith, D.J. (1980). "Monolithic Silicon Bolometers". Journal of Infrared and Millimeter Waves. 1 (6): 910. doi:10.1364/ao.23.000910. PMID 18204660.
- R. Weiss (1980). "Measurements of the Cosmic Background Radiation". Annual Review of Astronomy and Astrophysics. 18: 489–535. Bibcode:1980ARA&A..18..489W. doi:10.1146/annurev.aa.18.090180.002421.
- R. Weiss (1980). "The COBE Project". Physica Scripta. 21 (5): 670. Bibcode:1980PhyS...21..670W. doi:10.1088/0031-8949/21/5/016. S2CID 250836076.
- R. Weiss, S.S. Meyer & A.D. Jeffries (1983). "A Search for the Sunyaev-Zel'dovich Effect at Millimeter Wavelengths". Astrophys. J. Lett. 271: L1. Bibcode:1983ApJ...271L...1M. doi:10.1086/184080.
- Weiss, R.; Halpern, M.; Benford, R.; Meyer, S.; Muehlner, D. (1988). "Measurements of the Anisotropy of the Cosmic Background Radiation and Diffuse Galactic Emission at Millimeter and Submillimeter Wavelengths". Astrophys. J. 332: 596. Bibcode:1988ApJ...332..596H. doi:10.1086/166679.
- Mather, J. C.; Cheng, E. S.; Eplee, R. E. (Jr.); Isaacman, R. B.; Meyer, S. S.; Shafer, R. A.; Weiss, R.; Wright, E. L.; Bennett, C. L.; Boggess, N. W.; Dwek, E.; Gulkis, S.; Hauser, M. G.; Janssen, M.; Kelsall, T.; Lubin, P. M.; Moseley, S. H. (Jr.); Murdock, T. L.; Silverberg, R. F.; Smoot, G. F.; Wilkinson, D. T. (1990). "A Preliminary Measurement of the Cosmic Microwave Background Spectrum by the Cosmic Background Explorer (COBE) Satellite". Astrophys. J. 354: L37. Bibcode:1990ApJ...354L..37M. doi:10.1086/185717.
- Smoot, G.; Bennett, C.; Weber, R.; Maruschak, J.; Ratliff, R.; Janssen, M.; Chitwood, J.; et al. (1990). "COBE Differential Microwave Radiometers: Instrument Design and Implementation". Astrophys. J. 360: 685. Bibcode:1990ApJ...360..685S. doi:10.1086/169154.
- R. Weiss (1990). "Interferometric Gravitational Wave Detectors". In N. Ashby; D. Bartlett; W. Wyss (eds.). Proceedings of the Twelfth International Conference on General Relativity and Gravitation. Cambridge University Press. pp. 331. ISBN 9780521384285.
- Shoemaker, David; Fritschel, Peter; Giaime, Joseph; Christensen, Nelson; Weiss, Rainer (1991). "Prototype Michelson Interferometer with Fabry-Perot Cavities". Applied Optics. 30 (22): 3133–8. Bibcode:1991ApOpt..30.3133S. doi:10.1364/AO.30.003133. PMID 20706365.

== See also ==
- List of Jewish Nobel laureates
