= David Reitze =

American laser physicist (born 1961)

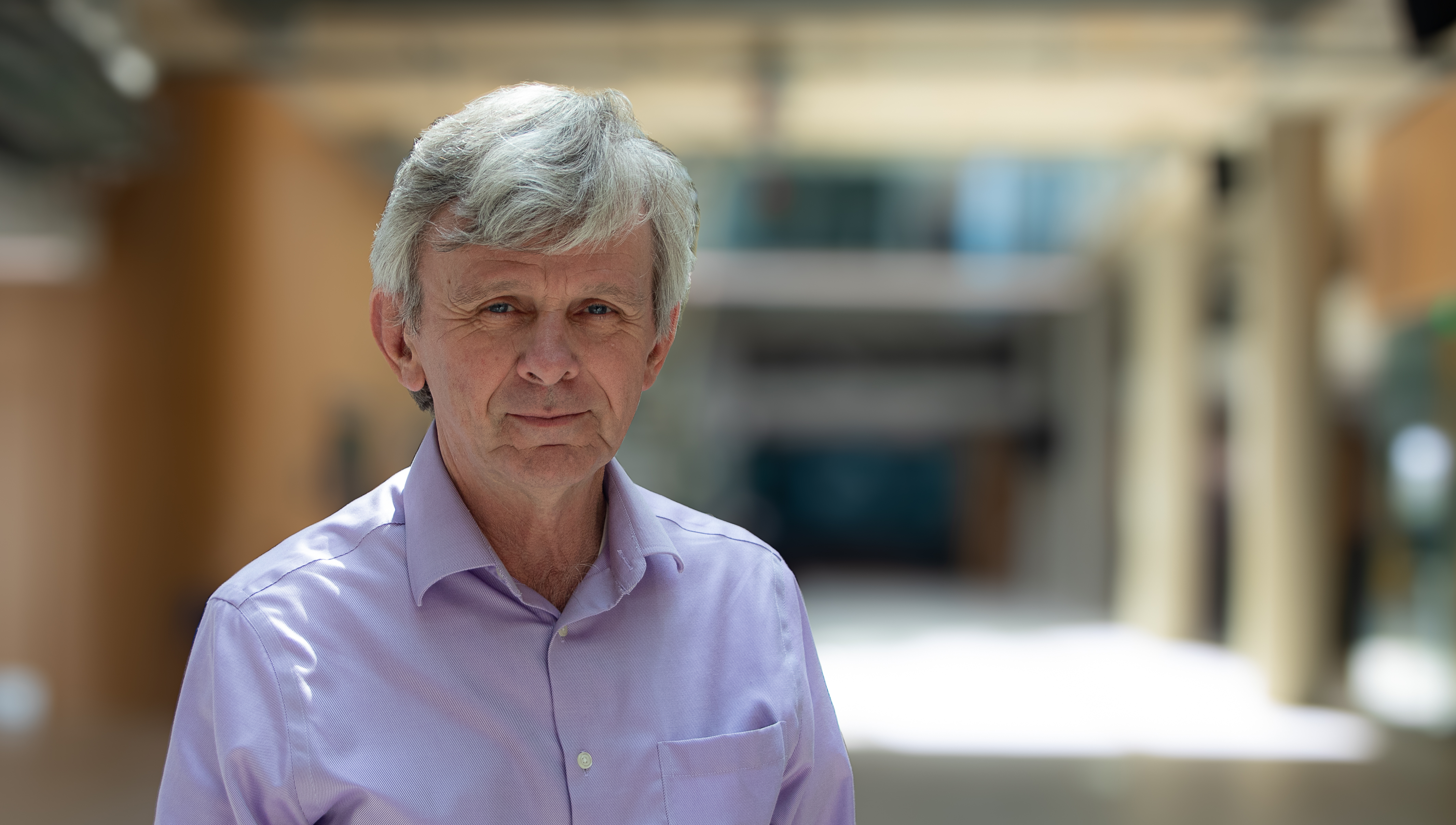
- Born: 6 January 1961 (age 65); Washington, Pennsylvania
- Education: B.A. in physics (with honors), Northwestern University; PhD in physics, The University of Texas at Austin
- Known for: Laser-based interferometric gravitational wave detection
- Scientific career
- Fields: Physics, astronomy
- Workplaces: Executive director, LIGO Laboratory; research professor of physics, California Institute of Technology; professor of physics, University of Florida

David Howard Reitze (born 6 January 1961) is an American laser physicist who is professor of physics at the University of Florida and served as the scientific spokesman of the Laser Interferometer Gravitational-Wave Observatory (LIGO) experiment in 2007-2011. In August 2011, he took a leave of absence from the University of Florida to be the Executive Director of LIGO, stationed at the California Institute of Technology, Pasadena, California. He obtained his BA in 1983 from Northwestern University, his PhD in physics from the University of Texas at Austin in 1990, and had positions at Bell Communications Research and Lawrence Livermore National Laboratory, before taking his faculty position at the University of Florida. He is a Fellow of the American Physical Society, the Optical Society, and the American Association for the Advancement of Science.

An expert in ultrafast optics and laser spectroscopy, he now specialises in laser-based interferometric gravitational wave detection. This includes the development of new interferometer topologies for next generation gravitational wave detectors, investigations of thermal loading in passive and active optical elements, development of high power optical components, and the design, construction and operation of the LIGO interferometers.

As Director of the LIGO Laboratory, one of his main efforts has been planning the proposed extension of the LIGO network of detectors to include one in India.

In February 2016, he, as executive director of LIGO, announced that the first direct gravitational wave observation had occurred on 14 September 2015 by the LIGO Scientific Collaboration and Virgo Collaboration using the LIGO detectors in Hanford, WA and Livingston, LA. (Note: Other LIGO physicists present for the announcement were Gabriela González, Rainer Weiss, Kip Thorne, and France A. Córdova from the NSF.)

Reitze, along with other former and present spokespersons of the LIGO Scientific Collaboration, was awarded the National Academy of Sciences Award for Scientific Discovery in 2017.

In 2019, Reitze co-edited a book with Peter Saulson and Hartmut Grote on the current state of gravitational-wave detectors and future upgrades. The book discusses about both LIGO and Virgo interferometers.
