= Jess McIver =

American astrophysicist

- Born: New York, United States

Academic background
- Education: BSc, Physics and Journalism, Syracuse University; MSc, PhD, 2015, University of Massachusetts Amherst
- Thesis: The impact of terrestrial noise on the detectability and reconstruction of gravitational wave signals from core-collapse supernovae (2015)

Academic work
- Discipline: Astronomy, Physics
- Sub-discipline: Gravitational wave astrophysics
- Institutions: University of British Columbia

Jess McIver is an American astronomer. She is an Associate Professor and Tier 2 Canada Research Chair in Gravitational Wave Astrophysics in the Department of Physics and Astronomy at the University of British Columbia. McIver is a member of LIGO, one of the recipients of the Science 2017 Breakthrough of the Year.

== Early life and education ==
McIver grew up near Schenectady, New York, and graduated from Mohonasen High School in 2005. Following high school, she enrolled at Syracuse University for a dual Bachelor's degree in Physics and Journalism. As an undergraduate, McIver started working on the Laser Interferometer Gravitational-Wave Observatory (LIGO) project. Upon graduating from Syracuse, she then went on to the University of Massachusetts Amherst for her Master's degree and PhD in Physics. McIver continued to focus on the LIGO project, which was the subsequent focus of her dissertation on detecting gravitational waves and received her PhD in 2015. Following her PhD, McIver accepted a postdoctoral fellowship in experimental physics at the California Institute of Technology.

== Career ==
Following her postdoctoral studies, McIver continued to work with LIGO. She worked with the instruments which enable detection of gravitational waves, including LIGO, Virgo, and KAGRA, among others. In particular, McIver and her group lead efforts in detector noise characterization and detector calibration. This work enables studies of merging systems of black holes and neutron stars. McIver also works on multi-messenger astronomy and was part of the team which worked to detect the first binary neutron star merger, GW170817. In part due to her efforts, she was a member of the teams that received the Science 2017 Breakthrough of the Year for Cosmic convergence: The merger of two neutron stars captivated thousands of observers and fulfilled multiple astrophysical predictions.

Following this, McIver joined the faculty at the University of British Columbia as an assistant professor in their Department of Physics. In this role, her research team contributed to LIGO by searching for gravitational wave signals from spinning neutron stars and recovering signals in addition to improving and calibrating the Advanced LIGO detectors. Their efforts helped lead to the discovery of the most asymmetric gravitational-wave source yet observed by scientists after the harmonics in gravitational wave signals observed from the collision of black holes. Later that year, McIver's research team helped confirm the existence of 39 new gravitational wave event detections. In January 2022, McIver was appointed a Tier 2 Canada Research Chair in Gravitational Wave Astrophysics.
