= Duncan A. Brown =

American physicist (born 1976)

- Born: January 25, 1976 (age 50)
- Citizenship: United States
- Awards: AAAS Fellow
- Scientific career
- Institutions: Syracuse University
- Thesis: Searching for gravitational radiation from black hole MACHOs in the galactic halo (2004)
- Doctoral advisor: Patrick R. Brady

Duncan Alexander Brown (born January 25, 1976) is a British-American astrophysicist and the Charles Brightman Endowed Professor of Physics at Syracuse University. He also serves as the Vice President for Research for Syracuse. Brown's research focuses on Gravitational-wave astronomy and gravitational-wave detectors.

== Background ==
Brown grew up in England and attended the University of Newcastle Upon Tyne, graduating in 1999 with a Master of Mathematics degree. He earned a Ph.D. in physics from the University of Wisconsin - Milwaukee in 2004, followed by a postdoctoral fellowship at the California Institute of Technology LIGO Laboratory and Theoretical Astrophysics and Relativity Group.

In 2007, Brown joined the faculty at Syracuse University. He was named the Charles Brightman Professor of Physics in 2015.

== Awards ==
- 2008 Faculty Early Career Development Program (CAREER) Award, National Science Foundation
- 2009 Kavli Frontiers Fellow
- 2010 Cottrell Scholar, Research Corporation for Science Advancement.
- 2014 Fellow of the American Physical Society
- 2015 Scialog Fellow Research Corporation for Science Advancement.
- 2026 Fellows of the American Association for the Advancement of Science
