= 3C 273 =

Brightest quasar from Earth located in the constellation Virgo

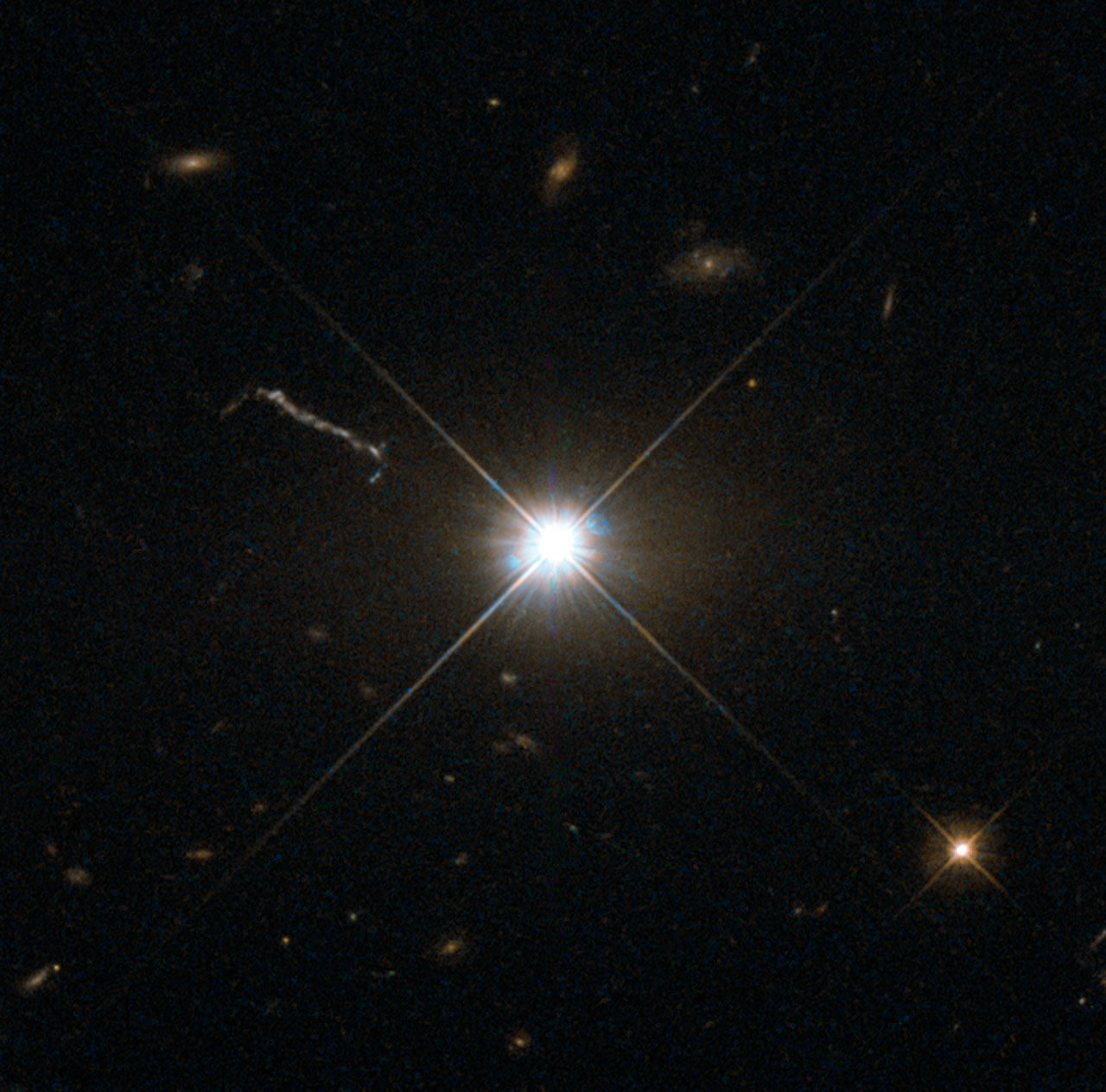
- Quasar 3C 273 taken by HST

Observation data (Epoch J2000)
- Constellation: Virgo
- Right ascension: 12^{h} 29^{m} 06.7^{s}
- Declination: +02° 03′ 09″
- Redshift: 0.158339 ± 0.000067
- Distance: 2.443 Gly (749 Mpc) (luminosity distance); 1.80+0.32 −0.28 Gly (552+97 −79 Mpc) (parallax distance)
- Type: Blazar; Sy1
- Apparent magnitude (V): 12.9
- Notable features: optically brightest quasar, first spectrum of a quasar

Other designations
- PGC 41121 and HIP 60936

3C 273 is a quasar located at the center of a giant elliptical galaxy in the constellation of Virgo. It was the first quasar ever to be identified and is the visually brightest quasar in the sky as seen from the Earth, with an apparent visual magnitude of 12.9, outshining by more than 16 times the entire galaxy that hosts it. The derived distance to this object is 749 megaparsecs (2.4 billion light-years). The mass of its central supermassive black hole is approximately 900 million times the mass of the Sun.

== Observation ==
3C 273 is visible from March to July in both the northern and southern hemispheres. Situated in the Virgo constellation, it is bright enough to be observed by eye with a 6-inch (150 mm) amateur telescope. Due in part to its radio luminosity and its discovery as the first identified quasar, 3C 273's right ascension in the Fifth Fundamental Catalog (FK5) is used to standardize the positions of 23 extragalactic radio sources used to define the International Celestial Reference System (ICRS).

Given its distance from Earth and visual magnitude, 3C 273 is the most distant celestial object average amateur astronomers are likely to see through their telescopes.

== Properties ==
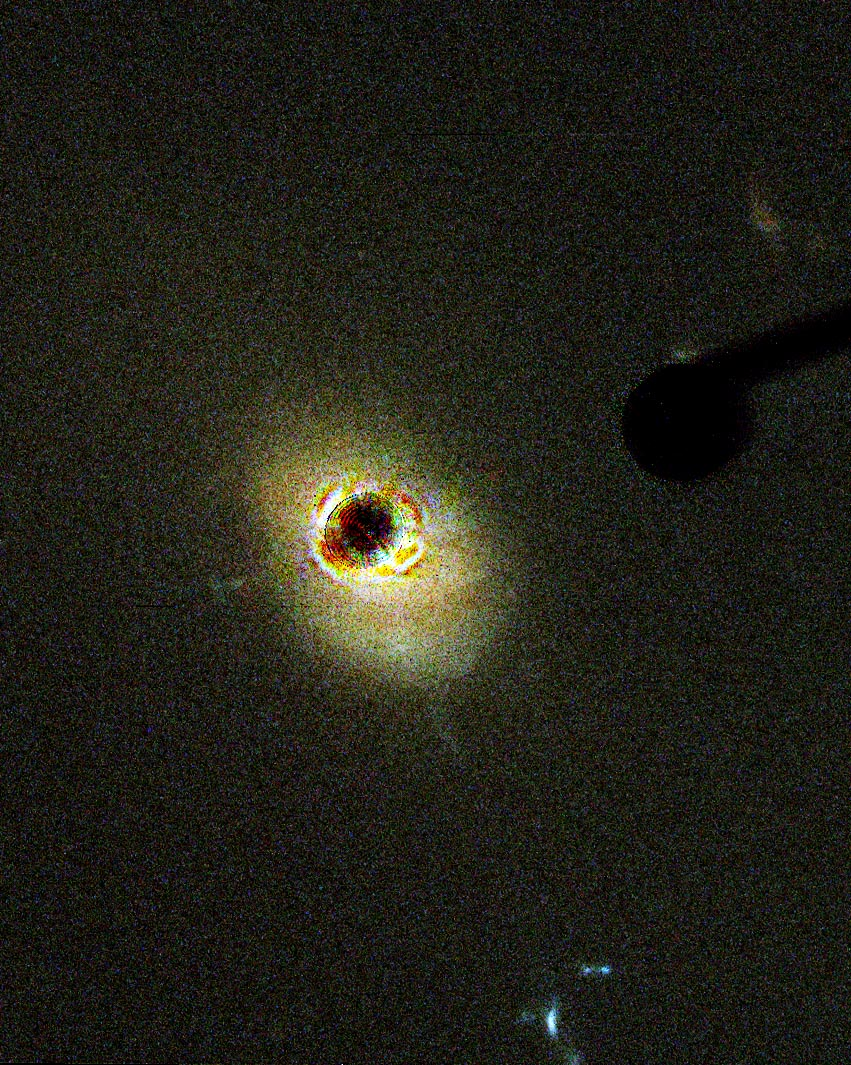
3C 273 as imaged by the Hubble Space Telescope's Advanced Camera for Surveys. Light from the bright quasar nucleus is blocked by a coronagraph so that the surrounding host galaxy can more easily be seen. Credit: NASA/ESA

This is the optically brightest quasar in the sky from Earth with an apparent visual magnitude of ~12.9, and one of the closest with a redshift, z, of 0.158. A luminosity distance of D_{L} = 749 megaparsecs (2.4 billion light-years) may be calculated from z. Using parallax methods with the Very Large Telescope interferometer yields an angular distance estimate of D_{A}=1.80+0.32
−0.28 Gly (552+97
−79 Mpc). The latter distance is related to the comoving distance as $D_L=(1+z)^2D_A$.

It is one of the most luminous quasars known, with an absolute magnitude of −26.7, meaning that if it were only as distant as Pollux (~10 parsecs) it would appear nearly as bright in the sky as the Sun. Since the Sun's absolute magnitude is 4.83, it means that the quasar is over 4 trillion times more luminous than the Sun at visible wavelengths.

The luminosity of 3C 273 is variable at nearly every wavelength from radio waves to gamma rays on timescales of a few days to decades. Polarization with coincident orientation has been observed with radio, infrared, and optical light being emitted from a large-scale jet; these emissions are therefore almost certainly synchrotron in nature. The radiation is created by a jet of charged particles moving at relativistic speeds. VLBI radio observations of 3C 273 have revealed proper motion of some of the radio emitting regions, further suggesting the presence of relativistic jets of material.

This is a prototype of an Active Galactic Nucleus, demonstrating that the energy is being produced through accretion by a supermassive black hole (SMBH). No other astrophysical source can produce the observed energy. The mass of its central SMBH has been measured to be 886±187 million solar masses through broad emission-line reverberation mapping.

=== Large-scale jet ===
The quasar has a large-scale visible jet, which measures ~200,000 light-years (61 kpc) long, having an apparent size of 23″. Such jets are believed to be created by the interaction of the central black hole and the accretion disk. In 1995, optical imaging of the jet using the Hubble Space Telescope revealed a structured morphology evidenced by repeated bright knots interlaced by areas of weak emission. The viewing angle of the jet is about 6° as seen from Earth. The jet was observed to abruptly change direction by an intrinsic angle of 2° in 2003, which is larger than the jet's intrinsic opening angle of 1.1°. An expanding cocoon of heated gas is being generated by the jet, which may be impacting an inclined disk of gas within the central ~ 6 kpc.

=== Host galaxy ===
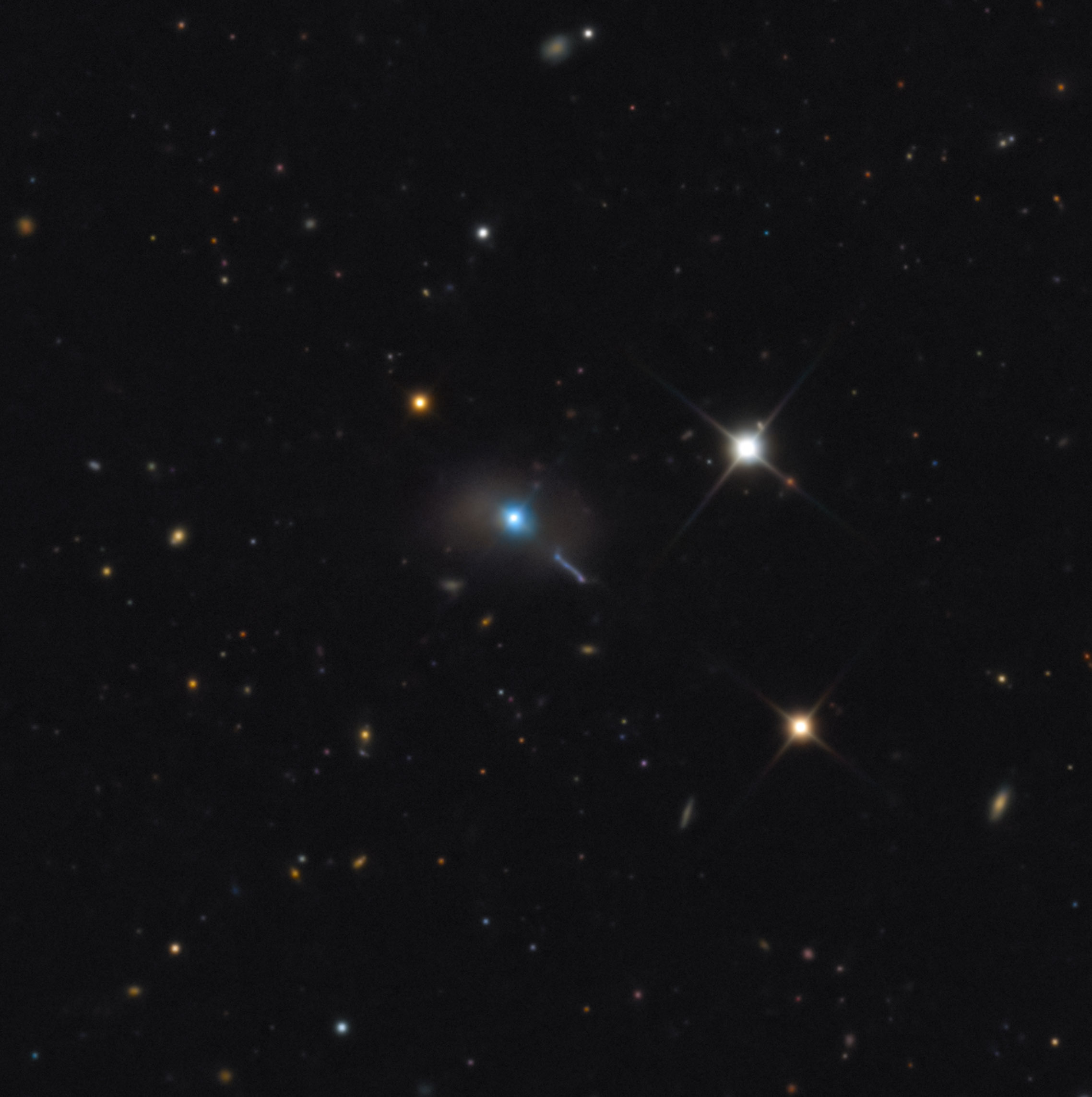
The first complete ground-based color image of quasar 3C 273, revealing the host galaxy and relativistic jet through PSF subtraction of the quasar's point-source light.

3C 273 lies at the center of a giant elliptical galaxy with an apparent magnitude of 16 and an apparent size of 29 arcseconds. The morphological classification of the host galaxy is E4, indicating a moderately flattened elliptical shape. The galaxy has an estimated mass of ~ 2×10^{11} M_{☉}.

== History ==
The name signifies that it was the 273rd object (ordered by right ascension) of the Third Cambridge Catalog of Radio Sources (3C), published in 1959. After accurate positions were obtained using lunar occultation by Cyril Hazard at the Parkes Radio Telescope, the radio source was quickly associated with an optical counterpart, an unresolved stellar object. In 1963, Maarten Schmidt and Bev Oke published a pair of papers in Nature reporting that 3C 273 has a substantial redshift of 0.158, placing it several billion light-years away.

Prior to the discovery of 3C 273, several other radio sources had been associated with optical counterparts, the first being 3C 48. Also, many active galaxies had been misidentified as variable stars, including the famous BL Lac, W Com and AU CVn. However, it was not understood what these objects were, since their spectra were unlike those of any known stars. Its spectrum did not resemble that of any normal stars with typical stellar elements. 3C 273 was the first object to be identified as a quasar—an extremely luminous object at an astronomical distance.

3C 273 is a radio-loud quasar, and was also one of the first extragalactic X-ray sources discovered in 1970. However, the process which gives rise to the X-ray emissions was still controversial as of 2006 when new observations were reported with the Spitzer Space Telescope.

== See also ==
- List of quasars
