= Dawn Erb =

American physicist

- Born: Dawn K. Erb

Academic background
- Education: B.S., Physics and Astronomy, 2000, University of Washington; PhD, Astrophysics, 2005, California Institute of Technology
- Website: dawnerb.github.io dawnerb.net

Dawn Erb
- Known for: Dawn Erb is known for her galaxy formation and evolution. Professor Erb's research includes galaxy formation and evolution, the kinematics, chemical evolution and stellar populations of galaxies at high redshift, feedback processes in starburst galaxies, and the evolution of the intergalactic medium at high redshift.
- Website: Galaxy formation and evolution#HeroSection https://www.epfl.ch/labs/galspec/high-redshift-galaxies/

Notes
- Galaxy formation is the way galaxies change over time, and the processes that have generated the variety of structures observed in nearby galaxies, High Redshift refers to astronomical objects that are very distant, indicating they are moving away from us due to the expansion of the universe. kind of how we will see a color depending on how fast it is moving.

Dawn K. Erb is an American physicist. She is an associate professor in the department of physics at the University of Wisconsin–Milwaukee. Erb's focus is primarily in astrophysics concentrating on the formation and development of galaxies. Her papers focus on various properties of galaxies, including kinematics, chemical transformation, and development of the intergalactic medium using red shift, bringing insight to how these large interstellar clusters develop.

== Early life and education ==
Erb completed her PhD in astrophysics from the California Institute of Technology in 2005 and accepted a postdoctoral fellowship at the Center for Astrophysics | Harvard & Smithsonian.

== Career ==
In 2010, Erb joined the department of physics at the University of Wisconsin–Milwaukee as an associate professor and became a visiting assistant professor at the University of Wisconsin–Madison. While working in this role, she received an National Science Foundation Early Career Development Award worth $800,000 to conduct research on galaxy formation and evolution in the early universe.

Erb subsequently published Feedback in low-mass galaxies in the early Universe which concluded that low-mass galaxies were vitally important to gain a better understanding of the universe's reionization. In 2018, her research was recognized by the National Academy of Sciences as she was selected as a Kavli Fellow by the National Academy of Science Frontiers of Science Program. Likewise, she led research at the W. M. Keck Observatory in Hawaii to examine a particular ultraviolet wavelength of light that illuminates a gaseous halo surrounding Q2343-BX418.

During the COVID-19 pandemic, Erb was ranked in the top 2% of scientists around the world and named Research Mentor of the Year.

== Selected publications ==
- Erb, Dawn; Steidel, Charles; Shapley, Alice; Max Pettini; Reddy, Naveen; Kurt L. Adelberger (2006). "The Stellar, Gas, and Dynamical Masses of Star‐forming Galaxies at z∼ 2". The Astrophysical Journal. 646 (1): 107–132. arXiv:astro-ph/0604041. Bibcode:2006ApJ...646..107E. doi:10.1086/504891. Wikidata Q55981042.
- Shapiro, Kristen; Genzel, Reinhard; Schreiber, Natascha; et al. (2008). "Kinemetry of SINS High‐Redshift Star‐Forming Galaxies: Distinguishing Rotating Disks from Major Mergers". The Astrophysical Journal. 682 (1): 231–251. arXiv:0802.0879. Bibcode:2008ApJ...682..231S. doi:10.1086/587133. Wikidata Q58912062.
- Ivezic, Željko; Goldston, Josh; Finlator, Kristian; et al. (2000). "Candidate RR Lyrae Stars Found in Sloan Digital Sky Survey Commissioning Data". The Astronomical Journal. 120 (2): 963–977. arXiv:astro-ph/0004130. Bibcode:2000AJ....120..963I. doi:10.1086/301455. Wikidata Q56943384.
