= Crawford Greenewalt =

American chemical engineer

Crawford Hallock Greenewalt
- Born: August 16, 1902; Cummington, Massachusetts
- Died: September 27, 1993 (aged 91); Wilmington, Delaware
- Education: Massachusetts Institute of Technology (SB, 1922)
- Scientific career
- Fields: Chemical Engineering
- Workplaces: DuPont

Crawford Hallock Greenewalt (August 16, 1902 – September 28, 1993) was an American chemical engineer who was president of the DuPont Company from 1948 to 1962, and chairman from 1962 to 1967.

== Early life ==
Crawford Hallock Greenewalt was born in Cummington, Massachusetts, the son of Frank Lindsay Greenewalt and Mary Hallock-Greenewalt, an inventor and pianist born in Beirut. In 1922, he earned a Bachelor of Science degree in chemical engineering from Massachusetts Institute of Technology, where he joined Theta Chi fraternity. He later became a Life Member of the MIT Corporation in 1951, and emeritus in 1977.

== Career ==
While at DuPont, Greenewalt was a key figure in their development of nylon and their nuclear power program. He was awarded the Lavoisier Medal for Technical Achievement by the DuPont Company in 1991.

His widely varied interests included ornithology and high-speed photography via his friend Harold E. "Doc" Edgerton. Greenewalt published a book of 70 high-speed photographs of hummingbirds in 1960 (Greenewalt, C.H. 1960. Hummingbirds Doubleday & Co., Garden City, New York.). And later, Dimensional relationships for flying animals Washington. Smithsonian Institution, 1962. In 1968, he published Bird Song. Acoustics and Physiology Smithsonian Institution Press, Washington, D.C. He was president of the American Philosophical Society.

Greenewalt is the subject of the film The Uncommon Man: Crawford H. Greenewalt, produced by the Atomic Heritage Foundation.

== Personal life ==
Greenewalt and his wife Margaretta (née Du Pont) had two sons, Crawford "Greenie" Greenewalt Jr. (1937-2012) and David Greenewalt, and daughter, Nancy L. Frederick. The younger Crawford was a professor of classical archaeology at the University of California, Berkeley who was among the leaders of the Archaeological Exploration of Sardis. David died in 2003.

Greenewalt died in Wilmington, Delaware in 1993, one day after having a stroke.

== See also ==
- John Mulchaey holds the Crawford H. Greenewalt chair at the Carnegie Observatories, of which he is also the director
