= Kurt Adelberger =

American astrophysicist and sustainability manager

- Education: Ph.D. from California Institute of Technology, B.S. in astronomy from Harvey Mudd College
- Known for: Astrophysics, Sustainability
- Spouse: Amy Adelberger
- Awards: Junior Fellow at Harvard University

Kurt Ludvig Adelberger is an American astrophysicist and sustainability manager. He formerly worked at Google as a principal in energy and sustainability, and was previously the engagement manager for McKinsey & Company.

== Biography ==
He earned his B.S. at Harvey Mudd College and a Ph.D. from the California Institute of Technology, where he was advised by Charles C. Steidel. His thesis was entitled Star formation and structure formation at redshifts 1 < z < 4, and has been cited in 31 other papers. He defended his thesis in 2001.

Prior to working at Mckinsey & Company, Adelberger worked at Carnegie Observatories. He has published 194 papers in the field of astrophysics, and has been cited over 2,000 times. In 2000, he was named a junior fellow of Harvard University.

== Selected publications ==
His notable publications include Lyman-Break Galaxies at z 4 and the Evolution of the Ultraviolet Luminosity Density at High Redshift, cited by 1945 other articles and Spectroscopic confirmation of a population of normal star-forming galaxies at redshifts z> 3 cited by 1,766 other articles. He has spoken at GreenBiz on how distributed generation will influence grid evolution. He also holds the patent for a thermostat system which allows the user to specify a range of acceptable temperatures.

- Charles C. Steidel; Kurt L. Adelberger; Alice E. Shapley; Max Pettini; Mark Dickinson; Mauro Giavalisco (20 March 2000). "Lyα Imaging of a Proto–Cluster Region at ⟨z⟩ = 3.09". The Astrophysical Journal. 532 (1): 170–182. arXiv:astro-ph/9910144. Bibcode:2000ApJ...532..170S. doi:10.1086/308568. ISSN 0004-637X. Wikidata Q56881755.
- Dawn K. Erb; Charles C. Steidel; Alice E. Shapley; Max Pettini; Naveen A. Reddy; Kurt L. Adelberger (20 July 2006). "The Stellar, Gas, and Dynamical Masses of Star‐forming Galaxies at z∼ 2". The Astrophysical Journal. 646 (1): 107–132. arXiv:astro-ph/0604041. Bibcode:2006ApJ...646..107E. doi:10.1086/504891. ISSN 0004-637X. Wikidata Q55981042.
- Scott C. Chapman; Douglas Scott; Charles C. Steidel; et al. (4 April 2002). "A search for the submillimetre counterparts to Lyman break galaxies". Monthly Notices of the Royal Astronomical Society. 319 (1): 318–330. arXiv:astro-ph/9909092. Bibcode:2000MNRAS.319..318C. doi:10.1046/J.1365-8711.2000.03866.X. ISSN 0035-8711. Wikidata Q58908395.
