= Rodighiero =

Rodighiero or Rodighiéro is a patronymic surname with its roots in Lower Bavaria.

== List of people with the surname ==
- Daniel Rodighiéro (born 1940), retired French footballer
- Giulia Rodighiero, Italian astronomer
- Ralph Rodighiero (born 1963), American politician from West Virginia

== See also ==
- Rodeghiero
- Rodríguez (surname)
