= May 24 =

May 24 this year in various calendars
- Sunday, 24 May 2026
Akan	Nwonakwasi
Armenian	8 Margach 1475
Aztec	Ochpaniztli 14, 5 Ehēcatl
Babylonian	6 Ayaru, 2337 SE
Balinese pawukon	Menga, Beteng, Laba, Umanis, Aryang, Redite of Warigadian, Indra, Jangur, Pandita
Bengali	10 Joishtho, BS 1433
Chinese	Yang Earth Dog・Star Mansion; Fire Horse Year, Month 4, Day 8 (Xiaoman, 12 days until Mangzhong)
Common Era	24 May 2026 CE
Coptic	16 Pashons, AM 1742
Egyptian	8 Phaophi, 2775 NE
Ethiopian	16 Genbot, 2018 Amätä Məhrät
French Republican	Décade I, Quintidi de Prairial de l'Année 234 de la République
Gregorian	24 May, AD 2026
Hebrew	8 Sivan, AM 5786
Hindu	Maghā・Vyāghāta; Solar: 10 Jyeṣṭha, 1948 SE; Lunisolar: Aṣṭamī, Śukla pakṣa of Adhika Jyeṣṭha, 2083 VE; Rāudra・5127 KY・1,872,719
Icelandic	Sunnudagur, 2 Skerpla 2026
Islamic	7 Dhu al-Hijjah, AH 1447 (using tabular method)
ISO week date	2026-W21-7
Japanese	8 Uzuki, Reiwa 8 (Shōman, 13 days until Bōshu)
Julian	11 May, AD 2026 (AM 7534)
Julian day	2461185
Korean	8 Baemdal, 4359 DE
Maya	13.0.13.11.2; 15 Zip, 5 Ik
Roman	ante diem V Idus Maias, MMDCCLXXIX AUC
Solar Hijri	3 Khordad, SH 1405
Tibetan	8 sa ga, me pho rta 2153 or 1772 or 1000

<<	May					>>
Su	Mo	Tu	We	Th	Fr	Sa
					1	2
3	4	5	6	7	8	9
10	11	12	13	14	15	16
17	18	19	20	21	22	23
24	25	26	27	28	29	30
31
2026

May 24 in recent years
2026 (Sunday)
2025 (Saturday)
2024 (Friday)
2023 (Wednesday)
2022 (Tuesday)
2021 (Monday)
2020 (Sunday)
2019 (Friday)
2018 (Thursday)
2017 (Wednesday)

May 24 is the 144th day of the year (145th in leap years) in the Gregorian calendar; 221 days remain until the end of the year.

== Events ==
=== Pre-1600 ===
- 919 – The nobles of Franconia and Saxony elect Henry the Fowler at the Imperial Diet in Fritzlar as king of the East Frankish Kingdom.
- 1218 – The Fifth Crusade leaves Acre for Egypt.
- 1276 – Magnus Ladulås is crowned King of Sweden in Uppsala Cathedral.
- 1487 – The ten-year-old Lambert Simnel is crowned in Christ Church Cathedral, Dublin, Ireland, with the name of Edward VI in a bid to threaten King Henry VII's reign.
- 1567 – Erik XIV of Sweden and his guards murder five incarcerated Swedish nobles.
- 1595 – Nomenclator of Leiden University Library appears, the first printed catalog of an institutional library.

=== 1601–1900 ===
- 1607 – Jamestown, the first permanent English colony in North America, is founded.
- 1621 – The Protestant Union is formally dissolved.
- 1626 – Peter Minuit buys Manhattan.
- 1667 – The French Royal Army crosses the border into the Spanish Netherlands, starting the War of Devolution opposing France to the Spanish Empire and the Triple Alliance.
- 1683 – The Ashmolean Museum in Oxford, England, opens as the world's first university museum.
- 1689 – The English Parliament passes the Act of Toleration protecting dissenting Protestants but excluding Roman Catholics.
- 1738 – John Wesley is converted, essentially launching the Methodist movement; the day is celebrated annually by Methodists as Aldersgate Day and a church service is generally held on the preceding Sunday.
- 1798 – The Irish Rebellion of 1798 led by the United Irishmen against British rule begins.
- 1813 – South American independence leader Simón Bolívar enters Mérida, leading the invasion of Venezuela, and is proclaimed El Libertador ("The Liberator").
- 1822 – Battle of Pichincha: Antonio José de Sucre secures the independence of the Presidency of Quito.
- 1832 – The First Kingdom of Greece is declared in the London Conference.
- 1844 – Samuel Morse sends the message "What hath God wrought" (a biblical quotation, Numbers 23:23) from a committee room in the United States Capitol to his assistant, Alfred Vail, in Baltimore, Maryland, to inaugurate a commercial telegraph line between Baltimore and Washington D.C.
- 1856 – John Brown and his men kill five slavery supporters at Pottawatomie Creek, Kansas.
- 1861 – American Civil War: Union troops occupy Alexandria, Virginia, with Colonel Elmer E. Ellsworth becoming the first Union officer to be killed during the war.
- 1873 – Patrick Francis Healy becomes the first black president of a predominantly white university in the United States.
- 1883 – The Brooklyn Bridge in New York City is opened to traffic after 14 years of construction.
- 1900 – Second Boer War: The United Kingdom annexes the Orange Free State.

=== 1901–present ===
- 1930 – Amy Johnson lands in Darwin, Northern Territory, becoming the first woman to fly solo from England to Australia (she left on May 5 for the 11,000 mile flight).
- 1935 – The first night game in Major League Baseball history is played in Cincinnati, Ohio, with the Cincinnati Reds beating the Philadelphia Phillies 2–1 at Crosley Field.
- 1940 – Igor Sikorsky performs the first successful single-rotor helicopter flight.
- 1940 – Acting on the orders of Soviet leader Joseph Stalin, NKVD agent Iosif Grigulevich orchestrates an unsuccessful assassination attempt on exiled Russian revolutionary Leon Trotsky in Coyoacán, Mexico.
- 1941 – World War II: Battle of the Atlantic: In the Battle of the Denmark Strait, the German battleship Bismarck sinks the pride of the Royal Navy, HMS Hood, killing all but three crewmen.
- 1944 – Börse Berlin building burns down after being hit in an air raid during World War II.
- 1944 – Congress of Përmet occurs which establishes a provisional government in Albania in areas under partisan control, the first independent Albanian government since 1939. In honor of this the national emblem of Albania inscribed this date from 1946 until 1992.
- 1948 – Arab–Israeli War: Egypt captures the Israeli kibbutz of Yad Mordechai, but the five-day effort gives Israeli forces time to prepare enough to stop the Egyptian advance a week later.
- 1956 – The first Eurovision Song Contest is held in Lugano, Switzerland.
- 1958 – United Press International is formed through a merger of the United Press and the International News Service.
- 1960 – Following the 1960 Valdivia earthquake, the largest ever recorded earthquake, Cordón Caulle begins to erupt.
- 1961 – American civil rights movement: Freedom Riders are arrested in Jackson, Mississippi, for "disturbing the peace" after disembarking from their bus.
- 1962 – Project Mercury: American astronaut Scott Carpenter orbits the Earth three times in the Aurora 7 space capsule.
- 1967 – Egypt imposes a blockade and siege of the Red Sea coast of Israel.
- 1967 – Belle de Jour, directed by Luis Buñuel, is released.
- 1976 – The Judgment of Paris takes place in France, launching California as a worldwide force in the production of quality wine.
- 1981 – Ecuadorian president Jaime Roldós Aguilera, his wife, and his presidential committee die in an aircraft accident while travelling from Quito to Zapotillo minutes after the president gave a famous speech regarding the 24 de mayo anniversary of the Battle of Pichincha.
- 1982 – Liberation of Khorramshahr: Iranians recapture the port city of Khorramshahr from the Iraqis during the Iran–Iraq War.
- 1988 – Section 28 of the United Kingdom's Local Government Act 1988, a controversial amendment stating that a local authority cannot intentionally promote homosexuality, is enacted.
- 1991 – Israel conducts Operation Solomon, evacuating Ethiopian Jews to Israel.
- 1992 – The last Thai dictator, General Suchinda Kraprayoon, resigns following pro-democracy protests.
- 1992 – The ethnic cleansing in Kozarac, Bosnia and Herzegovina begins when Serbian militia and police forces enter the town.
- 1993 – Eritrea gains its independence from Ethiopia.
- 1993 – Roman Catholic Cardinal Juan Jesús Posadas Ocampo and five other people are assassinated in a shootout at Miguel Hidalgo y Costilla Guadalajara International Airport in Mexico.
- 1994 – Four men are convicted of bombing the World Trade Center in New York in 1993; each one is sentenced to 240 years in prison.
- 1995 – While attempting to return to Leeds Bradford Airport in the United Kingdom, Knight Air Flight 816 crashes in Dunkeswick, North Yorkshire, killing all 12 people on board.
- 1999 – The International Criminal Tribunal for the former Yugoslavia in The Hague, Netherlands indicts Slobodan Milošević and four others for war crimes and crimes against humanity committed in Kosovo.
- 2000 – Israeli troops withdraw from southern Lebanon after 22 years of occupation.
- 2002 – Russia and the United States sign the Moscow Treaty.
- 2014 – A 6.4 magnitude earthquake occurs in the Aegean Sea between Greece and Turkey, injuring 324 people.
- 2014 – At least three people are killed in a shooting at Brussels' Jewish Museum of Belgium.
- 2019 – Twenty-two students die in a fire in Surat (India).
- 2019 – Under pressure over her handling of Brexit, British Prime Minister Theresa May announces her resignation as Leader of the Conservative Party, effective as of June 7.
- 2022 – A mass shooting occurs at Robb Elementary School in Uvalde, Texas, United States, resulting in the deaths of 21 people, including 19 children.
- 2026 – A suicide bombing targeting a shuttle train in Quetta, Balochistan, killed at least 48 people and injured 98 others.

== Births ==
=== Pre-1600 ===
- 15 BC – Germanicus, Roman general (died 19)
- 1335 – Margaret of Bohemia, Queen of Hungary (died 1349)
- 1494 – Pontormo, Italian painter (died 1557)
- 1522 – John Jewel, English bishop (died 1571)
- 1544 – William Gilbert, English physician, physicist, and astronomer (died 1603)
- 1576 – Elizabeth Carey, Lady Berkeley, English courtier (died 1635)

=== 1601–1900 ===
- 1616 – John Maitland, 1st Duke of Lauderdale, Scottish politician, Secretary of State, Scotland (died 1682)
- 1628 – Marek Sobieski, Polish noble (died 1652)
- 1669 – Emerentia von Düben, Swedish royal favorite (died 1743)
- 1671 – Gian Gastone de' Medici, Grand Duke of Tuscany (died 1737)
- 1686 – Daniel Gabriel Fahrenheit, Polish-German physicist and engineer, developed the Fahrenheit scale (died 1736)
- 1689 – Daniel Finch, 8th Earl of Winchilsea, English politician, Lord President of the Council (died 1769)
- 1743 – Jean-Paul Marat, Swiss-French physician, journalist, and politician (died 1793)
- 1789 – Cathinka Buchwieser, German operatic singer and actress (died 1828)
- 1794 – William Whewell, English priest and philosopher (died 1866)
- 1803 – Alexander von Nordmann, Finnish biologist and paleontologist (died 1866)
- 1810 – Abraham Geiger, German rabbi and scholar (died 1874)
- 1816 – Emanuel Leutze, German-American painter (died 1868)
- 1819 – Queen Victoria of the United Kingdom (died 1901)
- 1830 – Alexei Savrasov, Russian painter and academic (died 1897)
- 1855 – Arthur Wing Pinero, English actor, director, and playwright (died 1934)
- 1861 – Gerald Strickland, 1st Baron Strickland, Maltese lawyer and politician, 4th Prime Minister of Malta (died 1940)
- 1863 – George Grey Barnard, American sculptor (died 1938)
- 1868 – Charlie Taylor, American engineer and mechanic (died 1956)
- 1870 – Benjamin N. Cardozo, American lawyer and judge (died 1938)
- 1870 – Jan Smuts, South African lawyer and politician, 2nd Prime Minister of South Africa (died 1950)
- 1874 – Princess Marie of Hesse and by Rhine (died 1878)
- 1875 – Robert Garrett, American discus thrower and shot putter (died 1961)
- 1878 – Lillian Moller Gilbreth, American psychologist and engineer (died 1972)
- 1879 – H. B. Reese, American candy maker, created Reese's Peanut Butter Cups (died 1956)
- 1886 – Paul Paray, French organist, composer, and conductor (died 1979)
- 1887 – Mick Mannock, Irish soldier and pilot, Victoria Cross recipient (died 1918)
- 1891 – William F. Albright, American archaeologist, philologist, and scholar (died 1971)
- 1892 – Elizabeth Foreman Lewis, American author and educator (died 1958)
- 1893 – Walter Baade, German astronomer (died 1960)
- 1895 – Samuel Irving Newhouse Sr., American publisher, founded Advance Publications (died 1979)
- 1899 – Suzanne Lenglen, French tennis player (died 1938)
- 1899 – Henri Michaux, Belgian-French poet and painter (died 1984)
- 1900 – Eduardo De Filippo, Italian actor and screenwriter (died 1984)

=== 1901–present ===
- 1901 – José Nasazzi, Uruguayan footballer and manager (died 1968)
- 1902 – Lionel Conacher, Canadian football player and politician (died 1954)
- 1902 – Sylvia Daoust, Canadian sculptor (died 2004)
- 1904 – Chūhei Nambu, Japanese jumper and journalist (died 1997)
- 1905 – George Nakashima, American woodworker and architect (died 1990)
- 1905 – Mikhail Sholokhov, Russian novelist and short story writer, Nobel Prize laureate (died 1984)
- 1909 – Wilbur Mills, American banker and politician (died 1992)
- 1910 – Jimmy Demaret, American golfer (died 1983)
- 1913 – Joe Abreu, American baseball player and soldier (died 1993)
- 1914 – Lilli Palmer, German-American actress (died 1986)
- 1916 – Roden Cutler, Australian lieutenant and politician, 32nd Governor of New South Wales (died 2002)
- 1917 – Alan Campbell, Baron Campbell of Alloway, English lawyer and judge (died 2013)
- 1918 – Coleman Young, American politician, 66th Mayor of Detroit (died 1997)
- 1921 – Gertraud Gruber, German beautician and businesswoman (died 2022)
- 1922 – Siobhán McKenna, Irish actress (died 1986)
- 1924 – Philip Pearlstein, American soldier and painter (died 2022)
- 1925 – Carmine Infantino, American illustrator and educator (died 2013)
- 1925 – Mai Zetterling, Swedish actress and director (died 1994)
- 1926 – Stanley Baxter, Scottish actor and screenwriter (died 2025)
- 1928 – William Trevor, Irish novelist, playwright and short story writer (died 2016)
- 1930 – Robert Bateman, Canadian naturalist and painter
- 1932 – Arnold Wesker, English playwright and producer (died 2016)
- 1933 – Jane Byrne, American lawyer and politician, 50th Mayor of Chicago (died 2014)
- 1933 – Réal Giguère, Canadian television host and actor (died 2019)
- 1933 – Aharon Lichtenstein, French-Israeli rabbi and author (died 2015)
- 1935 – Joan Micklin Silver, American director and screenwriter (died 2020)
- 1936 – Harold Budd, American composer and poet (died 2020)
- 1937 – Maryvonne Dupureur, French runner and educator (died 2008)
- 1937 – Archie Shepp, American saxophonist and composer
- 1938 – Prince Buster, Jamaican singer-songwriter and producer (died 2016)
- 1938 – Tommy Chong, Canadian-American actor, director, producer, and screenwriter
- 1940 – Joseph Brodsky, Russian-American poet and essayist, Nobel Prize laureate (died 1996)
- 1941 – Bob Dylan, American singer-songwriter, guitarist, artist, writer, and producer; Nobel Prize laureate
- 1941 – Patricia Hollis, Baroness Hollis of Heigham, English academic and politician (died 2018)
- 1942 – Ali Bacher, South African cricketer and manager
- 1942 – Hannu Mikkola, Finnish race car driver (died 2021)
- 1942 – Ichirō Ozawa, Japanese lawyer and politician, Japanese Minister of Home Affairs
- 1943 – Gary Burghoff, American actor
- 1944 – Patti LaBelle, American singer-songwriter and actress
- 1944 – Dominique Lavanant, French actress
- 1945 – Terry Callier, American soul, folk and jazz guitarist and singer-songwriter (died 2012)
- 1945 – Steven Norris, English engineer and politician
- 1945 – Richard Ottaway, English lieutenant and politician, Shadow Secretary of State for Environment, Food and Rural Affairs
- 1945 – Priscilla Presley, American actress and businesswoman
- 1946 – Tansu Çiller, Turkish politician, Prime Minister of Turkey
- 1946 – Jesualdo Ferreira, Portuguese footballer and manager
- 1946 – Irena Szewińska, Russian-Polish sprinter (died 2018)
- 1947 – Albert Bouchard, American singer-songwriter, guitarist, and drummer
- 1947 – Mike De Leon, Filipino director, producer, screenwriter and cinematographer
- 1947 – Mike Reid, American singer-songwriter, pianist, and American football player
- 1947 – Waddy Wachtel, American guitarist, singer-songwriter, and record producer
- 1947 – Martin Winterkorn, German businessman
- 1948 – Richard Dembo, French director and screenwriter (died 2004)
- 1949 – Jim Broadbent, English actor
- 1949 – Roger Deakins, English cinematographer
- 1953 – Alfred Molina, English actor
- 1955 – Rosanne Cash, American singer-songwriter and guitarist
- 1955 – Philippe Lafontaine, Belgian singer and songwriter
- 1955 – Rajesh Roshan, Indian composer
- 1956 – R. B. Bernstein, American constitutional historian (died 2023)
- 1956 – Dominic Grieve, English lawyer and politician, Attorney General for England and Wales
- 1956 – Michael Jackson, Irish archbishop
- 1958 – Chip Ganassi, American race car driver, team owner and businessman
- 1959 – Pelle Lindbergh, Swedish-American ice hockey player (died 1985)
- 1959 – Barry O'Farrell, Australian politician, 43rd Premier of New South Wales
- 1960 – Guy Fletcher, English keyboard player, guitarist, and producer
- 1960 – Bill Harrigan, Australian rugby league referee and sportscaster
- 1960 – Kristin Scott Thomas, English actress
- 1961 – Lorella Cedroni, Italian philosopher and theorist (died 2013)
- 1961 – Alain Lemieux, Canadian-American ice hockey player and coach
- 1962 – Héctor Camacho, Puerto Rican-American boxer (died 2012)
- 1962 – Gene Anthony Ray, American actor, dancer, and choreographer (died 2003)
- 1963 – Ivan Capelli, Italian race car driver and sportscaster
- 1963 – Michael Chabon, American novelist, short story writer, and screenwriter
- 1963 – Joe Dumars, American basketball player
- 1963 – Rich Rodriguez, American football player and coach
- 1963 – Valerie Taylor, American computer scientist and educator
- 1964 – Liz McColgan, Scottish educator and runner
- 1964 – Adrian Moorhouse, English swimmer
- 1964 – Isidro Pérez, Mexican boxer (died 2013)
- 1964 – Pat Verbeek, Canadian ice hockey player and manager
- 1965 – John C. Reilly, American actor
- 1965 – Shinichirō Watanabe, Japanese director, producer, and screenwriter
- 1966 – Eric Cantona, French footballer and actor
- 1966 – Ricky Craven, American race car driver and sportscaster
- 1967 – Tamer Karadağlı, Turkish actor
- 1967 – Andrey Borodin, Russian-English economist and businessman
- 1967 – Eric Close, American actor
- 1967 – Heavy D, Jamaican-American rapper, producer, and actor (died 2011)
- 1967 – Carlos Hernández, Venezuelan-American baseball player and manager
- 1969 – Martin McCague, Northern Irish-English cricketer
- 1969 – Jacob Rees-Mogg, English politician
- 1969 – Rich Robinson, American guitarist and songwriter
- 1969 – Mandar Agashe, Indian music director and businessman
- 1971 – Kris Draper, Canadian ice hockey player and manager
- 1972 – Greg Berlanti, American director, producer, and screenwriter
- 1973 – Rodrigo, Argentinian singer-songwriter (died 2000)
- 1973 – Bartolo Colón, Dominican-American baseball player
- 1973 – Shirish Kunder, Indian director, producer, and screenwriter
- 1973 – Vladimír Šmicer, Czech footballer and manager
- 1974 – Sébastien Foucan, French runner and actor
- 1974 – Masahide Kobayashi, Japanese baseball player and coach
- 1974 – Magnus Manske, German biochemist and computer programmer, developed MediaWiki
- 1975 – Will Sasso, Canadian actor and comedian
- 1975 – Marc Gagnon, Canadian speed skater
- 1975 – Giannis Goumas, Greek footballer and coach
- 1975 – Maria Lawson, English singer-songwriter
- 1976 – Alessandro Cortini, Italian-American singer and keyboard player
- 1976 – Catherine Cox, New Zealand-Australian netball player
- 1976 – Silje Vige, Norwegian singer
- 1977 – Jeet Gannguli, Indian score composer, music director and singer
- 1978 – Elijah Burke, American wrestler
- 1978 – Johan Holmqvist, Swedish ice hockey player
- 1978 – Brad Penny, American baseball player
- 1978 – Rose, French singer, songwriter and composer
- 1979 – Tracy McGrady, American basketball player
- 1979 – Kareem McKenzie, American football player
- 1980 – Jason Babin, American football player
- 1980 – Anthony Minichiello, Australian rugby league player
- 1981 – Andy Lee, Australian comedian, actor, and screenwriter
- 1982 – Issah Gabriel Ahmed, Ghanaian footballer
- 1982 – Rian Wallace, American football player
- 1983 – Custódio Castro, Portuguese footballer
- 1983 – Pedram Javaheri, Iranian-American meteorologist and journalist
- 1983 – Woo Seung-yeon, South Korean model and actress (died 2009)
- 1984 – Sarah Hagan, American actress
- 1984 – Dmitri Kruglov, Estonian footballer
- 1984 – Masaya Takahashi, Japanese wrestler
- 1985 – Tim Bridgman, English race car driver
- 1986 – Mark Ballas, American singer-songwriter, guitarist, dancer, and actor
- 1986 – Giannis Kontoes, Greek footballer
- 1987 – Guillaume Latendresse, Canadian ice hockey player
- 1988 – Artem Anisimov, Russian ice hockey player
- 1988 – Monica Lin Brown, American sergeant
- 1988 – Billy Gilman, American musician
- 1988 – Lucian Wintrich, American political artist and White House correspondent
- 1988 – Denis Petrić, Slovenian footballer
- 1989 – G-Eazy, American rapper
- 1989 – Andrew Jordan, English race car driver
- 1989 – Kalin Lucas, American basketball player
- 1990 – Mattias Ekholm, Swedish ice hockey player
- 1990 – Joey Logano, American race car driver
- 1991 – Aled Davies, Welsh discus thrower
- 1991 – Cody Eakin, Canadian ice hockey player
- 1992 – Marcus Bettinelli, English footballer
- 1994 – Rodrigo De Paul, Argentine footballer
- 1994 – Jarell Martin, American basketball player
- 1994 – Emma McKeon, Australian swimmer
- 1994 – Emily Nicholl, Scottish netball player
- 1994 – Daiya Seto, Japanese swimmer
- 1994 – Emily Temple Wood, American 2016 Wikipedian of the Year award
- 1996 – Shu Uchida, Japanese voice actress
- 1999 – Tarjei Sandvik Moe, Norwegian actor
- 2001 – Emily Austin, journalist and social media influencer
- 2002 – Saim Ayub, Pakistani cricketer

== Deaths ==
=== Pre-1600 ===
- 688 – Ségéne, bishop of Armagh (born c. 610)
- 1089 – Lanfranc, Archbishop of Canterbury
- 1136 – Hugues de Payens, first Grand Master of the Knights Templar (born c. 1070)
- 1153 – David I of Scotland (born 1083)
- 1201 – Theobald III, Count of Champagne (born 1179)
- 1351 – Abu al-Hasan Ali ibn Othman, Moroccan sultan (born 1297)
- 1408 – Taejo of Joseon (born 1335)
- 1425 – Murdoch Stewart, 2nd Duke of Albany, Scottish politician (born 1362)
- 1456 – Ambroise de Loré, French commander (born 1396)
- 1543 – Nicolaus Copernicus, Polish mathematician and astronomer (born 1473)

=== 1601–1900 ===
- 1612 – Robert Cecil, 1st Earl of Salisbury, English politician, Lord High Treasurer (born 1563)
- 1627 – Luis de Góngora, Spanish poet and cleric (born 1561)
- 1632 – Robert Hues, English mathematician and geographer (born 1553)
- 1665 – Mary of Jesus of Ágreda, Spanish Franciscan abbess and mystic (born 1602)
- 1734 – Georg Ernst Stahl, German physician and chemist (born 1660)
- 1792 – George Rodney, 1st Baron Rodney, English admiral and politician, 16th Governor of Newfoundland (born 1718)
- 1806 – John Campbell, 5th Duke of Argyll, Scottish field marshal and politician, Lord Lieutenant of Argyllshire (born 1723)
- 1843 – Sylvestre François Lacroix, French mathematician and academic (born 1765)
- 1848 – Annette von Droste-Hülshoff, German author and composer (born 1797)
- 1861 – Elmer E. Ellsworth, American colonel (born 1837)
- 1872 – Julius Schnorr von Carolsfeld, German painter and illustrator (born 1794)
- 1879 – William Lloyd Garrison, American journalist and activist (born 1805)
- 1881 – Samuel Palmer, English painter and illustrator (born 1805)

=== 1901–present ===
- 1901 – Louis-Zéphirin Moreau, Canadian bishop (born 1824)
- 1908 – Old Tom Morris, Scottish golfer and architect (born 1821)
- 1915 – John Condon, Irish-English soldier (born 1896)
- 1919 – Amado Nervo, Mexican poet, journalist, and educator (born 1870)
- 1923 – Rolf Skår, Norwegian engineer (born 1941)
- 1929 – Nikolai von Meck, Russian engineer (born 1863)
- 1939 – Fanny Searls, American biologist (born 1851)
- 1941 – Lancelot Holland, English admiral (born 1887)
- 1945 – Robert Ritter von Greim, German field marshal and pilot (born 1892)
- 1948 – Jacques Feyder, Belgian actor, director, and screenwriter (born 1885)
- 1949 – Alexey Shchusev, Russian architect, designed Lenin's Mausoleum and Moscow Kazanskaya railway station (born 1873)
- 1950 – Archibald Wavell, 1st Earl Wavell, English field marshal and politician, 43rd Governor-General of India (born 1883)
- 1951 – Thomas N. Heffron, American actor, director, screenwriter (born 1872)
- 1956 – Martha Annie Whiteley, English chemist and mathematician (born 1866)
- 1958 – Frank Rowe, Australian public servant (born 1895)
- 1959 – John Foster Dulles, American soldier, lawyer, and politician, 52nd United States Secretary of State (born 1888)
- 1963 – Elmore James, American singer-songwriter and guitarist (born 1918)
- 1965 – Sonny Boy Williamson II, American singer-songwriter and harmonica player (born 1908)
- 1974 – Duke Ellington, American pianist and composer (born 1899)
- 1976 – Denise Pelletier, Canadian actress (born 1923)
- 1979 – Ernest Bullock, English organist, composer, and educator (born 1890)
- 1981 – Herbert Müller, Swiss race car driver (born 1940)
- 1984 – Vince McMahon Sr., American wrestling promoter and businessman, founded WWE (born 1914)
- 1988 – Freddie Frith, English motorcycle road racer (born 1909)
- 1990 – Arthur Villeneuve, Canadian painter (born 1910)
- 1991 – Gene Clark, American singer-songwriter and guitarist (born 1944)
- 1992 – Hitoshi Ogawa, Japanese race car driver (born 1956)
- 1995 – Harold Wilson, English academic and politician, Prime Minister of the United Kingdom (born 1916)
- 1996 – Thomas F. Connolly, American admiral (born 1909)
- 1996 – Enrique Álvarez Félix, Mexican actor (born 1934)
- 1996 – Joseph Mitchell, American journalist and author (born 1908)
- 1997 – Edward Mulhare, Irish actor (born 1923)
- 2000 – Kurt Schork, American journalist and scholar (born 1947)
- 2000 – Majrooh Sultanpuri, Indian poet and songwriter (born 1919)
- 2002 – Wallace Markfield, American author (born 1926)
- 2003 – Rachel Kempson, English actress (born 1910)
- 2004 – Henry Ries, German-American photographer (born 1917)
- 2004 – Milton Shulman, Canadian author and critic (born 1913)
- 2004 – Edward Wagenknecht, American critic and educator (born 1900)
- 2005 – Carl Amery, German activist and author (born 1922)
- 2005 – Arthur Haulot, Belgian journalist and poet (born 1913)
- 2005 – Guy Tardif, Canadian academic and politician (born 1935)
- 2006 – Henry Bumstead, American art director and production designer (born 1915)
- 2006 – Claude Piéplu, French actor (born 1923)
- 2008 – Dick Martin, American actor, comedian, and director (born 1922)
- 2008 – Jimmy McGriff, American organist and bandleader (born 1936)
- 2008 – Andrew Stephen Wilson, British-American astronomer (born 1947)
- 2009 – Jay Bennett, American singer-songwriter, guitarist, and producer (born 1963)
- 2010 – Ray Alan, English ventriloquist, actor, and screenwriter (born 1930)
- 2010 – Paul Gray, American bass player and songwriter (born 1972)
- 2010 – Raymond V. Haysbert, American businessman and activist (born 1920)
- 2010 – Petr Muk, Czech singer-songwriter and guitarist (born 1965)
- 2010 – Anneliese Rothenberger, German soprano and actress (born 1926)
- 2011 – Huguette Clark, American heiress, painter, and philanthropist (born 1906)
- 2011 – Hakim Ali Zardari, Indian-Pakistani businessman and politician (born 1930)
- 2012 – Klaas Carel Faber, Dutch-German SS officer (born 1922)
- 2012 – Kathi Kamen Goldmark, American journalist and author (born 1948)
- 2012 – Jacqueline Harpman, Belgian psychoanalyst and author (born 1929)
- 2012 – Juan Francisco Lombardo, Argentinian footballer (born 1925)
- 2012 – Lee Rich, American production manager and producer (born 1918)
- 2013 – Helmut Braunlich, German-American violinist and composer (born 1929)
- 2013 – Ron Davies, Welsh footballer (born 1942)
- 2013 – Gotthard Graubner, German painter (born 1930)
- 2013 – Haynes Johnson, American journalist and author (born 1931)
- 2013 – Pyotr Todorovsky, Ukrainian-Russian director and screenwriter (born 1925)
- 2014 – David Allen, English cricketer (born 1935)
- 2014 – Stormé DeLarverie, known as the "Rosa Parks of the lesbian community" (born 1920)
- 2014 – Mahafarid Amir Khosravi, Iranian businessman (born 1969)
- 2014 – Knowlton Nash, Canadian journalist and author (born 1927)
- 2014 – John Vasconcellos, American lieutenant, lawyer, and politician (born 1932)
- 2015 – Dean Carroll, English rugby player (born 1962)
- 2015 – Kenneth Jacobs, Australian lawyer and judge (born 1917)
- 2015 – Tanith Lee, English author (born 1947)
- 2018 – John "TotalBiscuit" Bain, English gaming commentator and critic (born 1984)
- 2018 – Gudrun Burwitz, daughter of Margarete Himmler and Heinrich Himmler (born 1929)
- 2023 – Tina Turner, American-Swiss rock and pop singer, dancer, actress and author (born 1939)
- 2024 – Doug Ingle, American musician (born 1945)
- 2024 – Kabosu, Japanese dog and Internet meme celebrity (born 2005)
- 2025 – Gary Pierce, English footballer (born 1951)

== Holidays and observances ==
- Aldersgate Day/Wesley Day (Methodism)
- Battle of Pichincha Day (Ecuador)
- Bermuda Day (Bermuda), celebrated on the nearest weekday if May 24 falls on the weekend.
- Christian feast day:
  - Anna Pak Agi (one of The Korean Martyrs)
  - Donatian and Rogatian
  - Jackson Kemper (Episcopal Church)
  - Joanna
  - Juan de Prado
  - Blessed Louis-Zéphirin Moreau
  - Mary, Help of Christians
  - Sarah (celebrated by the Romani people of Camargue)
  - Simeon Stylites the Younger
  - Vincent of Lérins
  - May 24 (Eastern Orthodox liturgics)
- Commonwealth Day (Belize)
- Independence Day (Eritrea), celebrates the independence of Eritrea from Ethiopia in 1993.
- Lubiri Memorial Day (Buganda)
- Saints Cyril and Methodius Day (Eastern Orthodox Church, Julian Calendar) and its related observance:
  - Bulgarian Education and Culture and Slavonic Literature Day (Bulgaria)
  - Saints Cyril and Methodius, Slavonic Enlighteners' Day (North Macedonia)
- Victoria Day; celebrated on Monday on or before May 24. (Canada), and its related observance:
  - National Patriots' Day or Journée nationale des patriotes (Quebec)
