= Kim Weaver =

American astrophysicist astronomer

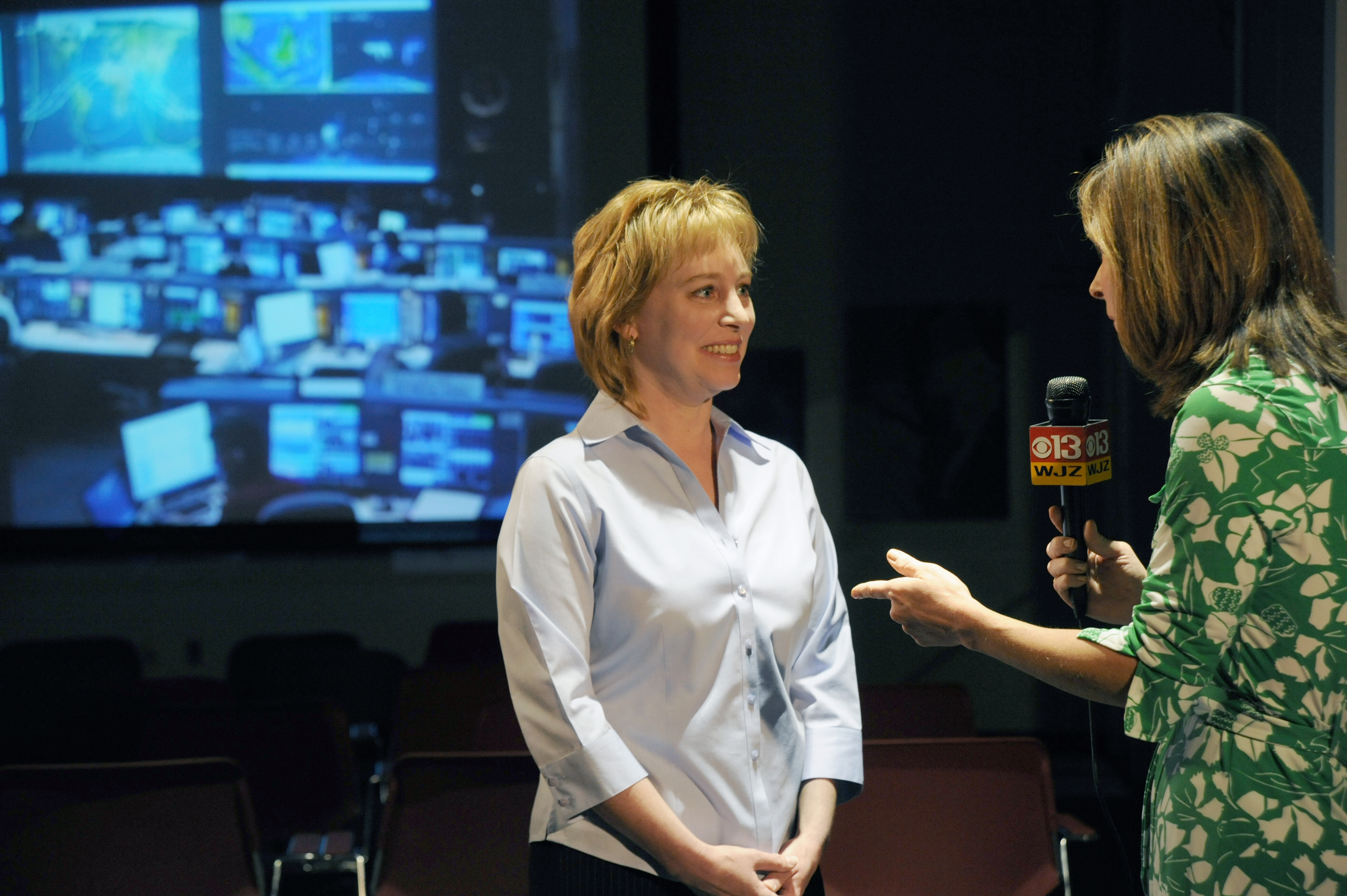
- Weaver talks to a reporter from WJZ-TV during STS-125 EVA activities at the Goddard visitor center
- Born: April 19, 1964 (age 62); Morgantown, West Virginia, U.S.
- Occupations: Professor, Lecturer, Author
- Known for: Research Science

Academic background
- Education: University of West Virginia and University of Maryland
- Doctoral advisor: Andrew Stephen Wilson and Richard Mushotzky

Dr. Kimberly A. Weaver (born April 19, 1964) is an American astrophysics astronomer and professor. She has worked with NASA on several research projects. She is often seen on television programs about astronomy. She is an expert in the area of x-ray astronomy.

== Early life and education ==
Weaver was born in Morgantown, West Virginia. As a five-year-old girl she was impressed by pictures of planets and galaxies as well as the 300 foot antenna dish of the National Radio Astronomy Observatory in Green Bank, West Virginia. She also credits the Apollo 11 lunar mission as the inspiration to become a career scientist at NASA.

She attended West Virginia University and completed a B.S.degree in physics in 1987. She then enrolled at the University of Maryland in 1988, where she began working as a student intern at NASA's Goddard Space Flight Center in Greenbelt, Maryland. Kim graduated from the University of Maryland in 1990 with M.S. in Astronomy. She was accepted to the University of Maryland at College Park and graduated in 1993 with Ph.D. in astronomy. Her doctoral thesis was in complex broad-band X-ray spectra of Seyfert Galaxies. Weaver spent an additional two years as a postdoctoral research associate at Penn State and another two years as an associate research scientist at Johns Hopkins University. In 1998, she returned to Goddard.

== Career ==
At Goddard's Laboratory for High Energy Astrophysics, Weaver was a civil servant scientist, focusing on X-ray astronomy, particularly the Constellation X satellite project, which is part of NASA's "Beyond Einstein" program, as the Deputy Project Scientist. During her tenure at Goddard, she also worked extensively with the Chandra X-ray Observatory where many important observations were made with respect to starburst galaxies, black holes and other astronomical phenomena. In addition to Chandra, Weaver has worked with other x-ray telescopes such as the XXM-Newton, RXTE, and the BeppoSAX, satellites. In 2005 she was on special assignment to the California Institute of Technology as the Spitzer Program Scientist for NASA. Weaver works now at NASA's Goddard Space Flight Center in Greenbelt, Maryland, as an Astrophysicist in the X-Ray astrophysics lab. Currently Weaver, in addition to working with NASA, is also an adjunct professor at Johns Hopkins University in Baltimore, Maryland.

Weaver's areas of research interest include general X-ray astronomy, active galactic nuclei, starburst galaxies, and black hole formation. She is involved with many professional groups and organizations, including: the American Astronomical Society's Executive Committee of the High Energy Astrophysics Division and Committee for the Status of Women in Astronomy; the International Astronomical Union; the American Physical Society; and the Goddard Employees Welfare Association.

== Awards ==
Weaver has received many awards including:

- 2011, West Virginia University Academy of Distinguished Alumni
- 2009, Robert H. Goddard Exceptional Achievement Award in Outreach
- 2009, Distinguished Alumna Award, University of Maryland Astronomy Department
- 2007, West Virginia University Alumni Recognition Award
- 1996, Presidential Early Career Award for Scientists and Engineers, NASA
- 1991-1993, NASA Graduate Student Researcher's Fellowship
- 1992, NASA Peer Award

== Publications ==
Weaver has been published in over 60 scientific journals, including:

- "On the Evidence of Extreme Gravity Effects in MCG-6-30-15", Weaver, K.A., and Yaqoob, T. 1998, ApJ, 502, L139
- "An X-Ray Minisurvey of Nearby Edge-On Starburst Galaxies. II. The Question of Metal Abundance.", Weaver, K.A., Heckman, T.M., Dahlem, M. 2000 ApJ 534, 684

She is also the author of the book, The Violent Universe: Joyrides Through the X-Ray Cosmos, published by Johns Hopkins University Press.

== Personal life ==
Weaver enjoys music, art, and singing. She also loves community theatre, where she participates in acting, directing and set design. She especially likes playing the part of Elvira in Noël Coward's Blithe Spirit. While in college she was a member of the WVU marching band and in 1986 was elected Miss Mountaineer. Weaver has a particular interest in involving children with astronomy. Her parents, Kenna (deceased in 2010) and Patricia Weaver, still reside in Morgantown, West Virginia.
