= Rodeghiero =

Rodeghiero is an Italian surname. It may refer to

- Christiano Rodeghiero (1915–?), Italian cross-country skier
- Rizzieri Rodeghiero (1919–1996), Italian cross-country skier, brother of Christiano
- Roberta Rodeghiero (born 1990), Italian figure skater
- Vanni Rodeghiero (born 1942), Italian javelin thrower

== See also ==
- Rodighiero
- Rodríguez (surname)
- Rodrigues (surname)
