= Giulia Rodighiero =

Italian astronomer

Giulia Rodighiero is an Italian astronomer whose research concerns galaxy formation and evolution, and the effect of galactic collisions on star formation. She is an associate professor of physics and astronomy at the University of Padua, where she completed her PhD in 2003. Rodighiero was the 2020 winner of the Premio Linceo per l'Astronomia of the Accademia dei Lincei, for her research on starburst galaxies. She was elected to the Academia Europaea in 2022.

== Life ==
Originally from Vicenza, Rodighiero completed her PhD at the University of Padua in 2003. She then worked at Caltech in California, the Institute of Astrophysics of the Canary Islands and the Max Planck Institute in Munich, before returning to Padua, where she is an associate professor of physics and astronomy.

== Research ==
Rodighiero’s research concerns galaxy formation and evolution, and the effect of galactic collisions on star formation. She is credited with the 2011 discovery of the role of violent collisions between galaxies in the formation of their stars, a “paradigm shift in the understanding of the history of star formation”.

In 2019 she was a member of a University of Padua-led team that used images from the James Webb Space telescope to show that some galaxies "contain surprising amounts of dust".

== Awards ==
Rodighiero was the 2020 winner of the Premio Linceo per l'Astronomia of the Accademia dei Lincei, for her research on starburst galaxies. She was elected to the Academia Europaea in 2022. She has been a member of the Member of the Accademia Olimpica since 2018.

== Selected publications ==
- M J Page; M Symeonidis; J D Vieira; et al. (9 May 2012), "The suppression of star formation by powerful active galactic nuclei", Nature, 485 (7397): 213–216, arXiv:1310.4147, Bibcode:2012Natur.485..213P, doi:10.1038/NATURE11096, ISSN 1476-4687, PMID 22575961, Wikidata Q50511312
- G. Rodighiero; E. Daddi; I. Baronchelli; et al. (2 September 2011), "The lesser role of starbursts in star formation at z = 2", The Astrophysical Journal Letters, 739 (2): 40, arXiv:1108.0933, Bibcode:2011ApJ...739L..40R, doi:10.1088/2041-8205/739/2/L40, ISSN 2041-8205, Wikidata Q58910727
- Stijn Wuyts; Natascha M. Förster Schreiber; Arjen van der Wel; et al. (11 November 2011), "Galaxy structure and mode of star formation in the SFR-mass plane from z ~ 2.5 to z ~ 0.1", The Astrophysical Journal, 742 (2): 96, arXiv:1107.0317, Bibcode:2011ApJ...742...96W, doi:10.1088/0004-637X/742/2/96, ISSN 0004-637X, Wikidata Q58908687
- G. Rodighiero; A. Cimatti; C. Gruppioni; et al. (July 2010), "The first Herschel view of the mass-SFR link in high-z galaxies", Astronomy & Astrophysics, 518: 25–25, arXiv:1005.1089, Bibcode:2010A&A...518L..25R, doi:10.1051/0004-6361/201014624, ISSN 0004-6361, Wikidata Q58912008
- A. Cimatti; P. Cassata; L. Pozzetti; et al. (9 January 2008), "GMASS ultradeep spectroscopy of galaxies at z ~ 2 II. Superdense passive galaxies: how did they form and evolve?", Astronomy & Astrophysics, 482 (1): 21–42, arXiv:0801.1184, Bibcode:2008A&A...482...21C, doi:10.1051/0004-6361:20078739, ISSN 0004-6361, Wikidata Q58910766
- B. Magnelli; D. Lutz; P. Santini; et al. (March 2012), "A Herschel view of the far-infrared properties of submillimetre galaxies", Astronomy & Astrophysics, 539: 155–155, arXiv:1202.0761, Bibcode:2012A&A...539A.155M, doi:10.1051/0004-6361/201118312, ISSN 0004-6361, Wikidata Q56550797
- Cristina Maria Lofaro; Giulia Rodighiero; Andrea Enia; et al. (June 2024), "Ancient stellar populations in the outskirts of nearby grand-design spirals: Investigation of their star formation histories", Astronomy & Astrophysics, 686: A124, Bibcode:2024A&A...686A.124L, doi:10.1051/0004-6361/202347626, ISSN 0004-6361, Wikidata Q128177028
