= Atomic Heritage Foundation =

Nonprofit for Atomic Age history

The Atomic Heritage Foundation
- Formation: 2002
- Founder: Cynthia Kelly
- Purpose: History and veterans of the Manhattan Project and Atomic Age.
- Headquarters: National Museum of Nuclear Science & History
- Location: Albuquerque, New Mexico
- President: Cynthia Kelly
- Website: ahf.nuclearmuseum.org

The Atomic Heritage Foundation (AHF) is a nonprofit organization originally based in Washington, DC, dedicated to the preservation and interpretation of the Manhattan Project, the Atomic Age, and its legacy. Founded by Cynthia Kelly in 2002, the Foundation's stated goal is, "to provide the public not only a better understanding of the past but also a basis for addressing scientific, technical, political, social and ethical issues of the 21st century." AHF works with Congress, the Department of Energy, the National Park Service, state and local governments, nonprofit organizations and the former Manhattan Project communities to preserve and interpret historic sites and develop useful and accessible educational materials for veterans, teachers, and the general public. In June 2019, the Atomic Heritage Foundation and the National Museum of Nuclear Science & History signed an agreement that granted stewardship of the Atomic Heritage Foundation website and all of the AHF's physical collections to the museum. The Atomic Heritage Foundation website is now run by the National Museum of Nuclear Science & History. Additionally, the museum now houses the Atomic Heritage Foundation's physical collections which have been integrated into the Nuclear Museum's own collection.

== Voices of the Manhattan Project ==
In November 2012, the Atomic Heritage Foundation (AHF) and the Los Alamos Historical Museum launched the "Voices of the Manhattan Project" website to feature their oral history collections. Together the AHF and the Los Alamos Historical Museum worked to collect oral histories until the historical society discontinued their participation. Sometime after 2020, the Los Alamos Historical Society removed access to several of the interviews in their original collection of twelve oral histories that were housed on their YouTube channel. Attempts by the National Museum of Nuclear Science & History to regain this access have so far been unsuccessful.

The interviews offer a variety of perspectives on the project. Some Native Americans discuss the government's displacement of the tribes from their ancestral lands in Hanford, Washington. In others, Pueblo Indians in New Mexico talk about the impact of the government project on their ancestral traditions and economy. Veterans recall blowing off steam by hiking and skiing in Los Alamos, dancing and bowling in Oak Ridge, and engaging in a meatball mess hall battle in Hanford. The veterans recalls the top scientists and personnel involved in the project, including J. Robert Oppenheimer, Leslie R. Groves, Enrico Fermi, and Leo Szilard.

The site features interviews with a number of well-known Manhattan Project veterans, including General Leslie Groves and Edward Teller.

== Site preservation ==
The Atomic Heritage Foundation is working in collaboration with the National Parks Conservation Association, the National Trust for Historic Preservation, local communities, and other organizations to urge Congress to establish a Manhattan Project National Historical Park. In March 2013, Senators Maria Cantwell and Lamar Alexander introduced S. 507 to create a park, and Representatives Doc Hastings, Ben Ray Lujan, and Chuck Fleischmann introduced a companion bill in the House, H.R. 1208.

The Los Alamos, V-Site was the site of assembly for the Trinity device, the first atomic weapon ever detonated. In October 2006, the AHF co-hosted several days of events to commemorate the successful restoration of the High Bay building.

== Museum exhibits ==
The Atomic Heritage Foundation has created several museum exhibits. They are:

=== Race for atomic power exhibit at Idaho Falls ===
The first nuclear reactor capable of producing usable amounts of electricity was Experimental Breeder Reactor I, which lit up four light bulbs on December 20, 1951. This historical milestone is one of many captured in the Race for Atomic Power exhibit that opened on May 24, 2005, at the EBR-I. Upon entering the EBR-I, visitors can relax in a 1950s living room and watch TV. Clips from the 1950s as well as Nuclear Pioneers, a brief history of the EBR-I produced by the Atomic Heritage Foundation. Throughout the exhibit are kiosks with video recordings of the veterans explaining aspects of the reactor's operations. In the control room, Kirby Whitham explains when the misunderstanding of the command, "Take it down," resulted in a partial meltdown of the reactor core. Blackboards present the fundamentals of nuclear fission and a cut-away diagram shows the inner workings of the reactor. The exhibit was created under the supervision of the AHF and is now run by the Museum of Idaho.

=== B Reactor exhibits at Hanford ===
This exhibit focuses on the Hanford Site and its role in the Manhattan Project. It feature exhibits on the B Reactor — the world's first plutonium production reactor — and its importance, models of the reactor and surrounding buildings, a documentary film (Hanford's Secret Wartime Mission), and vignettes and education materials on the history of the Hanford site. The exhibit was developed in partnership with the B Reactor Museum Association, the Hanford Reach National Monument Heritage and Visitor Center, and the Columbia River Exposition on History, Science and Technology.

== Books ==
The Atomic Heritage Foundation has created several books dealing with the Manhattan Project. They are:

The Manhattan Project: The Birth of the Atomic Bomb in the Words of Its Creators, Eyewitnesses, and Historians: An anthology that collects the writings and thoughts of the original participants in the Manhattan Project, along with pieces by the most important historians and interpreters of the subject.

The Manhattan Project Guidebook Series: A series of four guides to the Manhattan Project in Manhattan, New Mexico, Tennessee, and Washington state. The guidebooks relate the history and significance of the Manhattan Project in these areas.

Oppenheimer and the Manhattan Project: Edited by Cynthia Kelly, this book provides a spectrum of interpretations of J. Robert Oppenheimer's life and scientific achievements. Contributors include the Hon. Senator Jeff Bingaman, authors and historians Richard Rhodes, Martin Sherwin, Kai Bird and Robert S. Norris, and Andy Oppenheimer.

Remembering the Manhattan Project: Edited by Cynthia Kelly, part I of this book, comprising papers from the Atomic Heritage Foundation's Symposium on the Manhattan Project in Washington, DC on April 27, 2002, recounts the history of this remarkable effort and reflects upon its legacy. Contributors include Richard Rhodes, Robert S. Norris, Martin Sherwin and Kai Bird, Gregg Herken, James R. Schlesinger, and others. Part II proposes a strategy for preserving the historical properties and artifacts of the Manhattan Project for the public and future generations.

Race for Atomic Power: A companion book to the museum exhibit of the same name.

== Films ==
Hanford's Secret Wartime Mission: This documentary film chronicles the story of the Manhattan Project at Hanford where the world's first plutonium production facilities were built along the Columbia River in eastern Washington state. The undertaking paired the University of Chicago's team of extraordinary physicists led by Enrico Fermi with the DuPont Company's industrial expertise led by Crawford Greenewalt. The film highlights the determination, commitment, and scientific ingenuity of the men and women who took on the seemingly impossible task of producing plutonium in time to contribute to the war effort.

A Handful of Soldiers: features three Manhattan Project veterans who describe their experiences at Los Alamos working on the plutonium-based bomb. The twelve-minute film shows the remains of the "V Site" where the first atomic bomb was assembled.

Nuclear Pioneers: The 28-minute documentary film on the Experimental Breeder Reactor I (EBR-I) tells the story of the first nuclear reactor built by the Atomic Energy Commission. With first-hand accounts from scientists and engineers, the film explores the challenges of creating the world's first reactor to produce usable quantities of electricity and "breed" more fuel than it consumed. Completed in 1951, the EBR-I paved the way for future generations of "peaceful" reactors and was named a National Historic Landmark in 1966 by President Johnson.

Interviews with Manhattan Project Veterans, Vol. I-III: These films features interviews with seven Manhattan Project veterans. Complete with pictures from the Department of Energy's archives and short biographies of the veterans, the films describe what it was like to work on the top-secret project that changed world history and created a revolution in science and technology.

The Race for Atomic Power: This documentary film traces the history of the National Reactor Testing Station in Idaho Falls, with interviews of former and current employees of NRTS and Idaho National Laboratory. These vignettes discuss the innovations developed at NRTS during its first 25 years.

General Leslie R. Groves: A brief biography of General Leslie Groves, who built the Pentagon and then became the Manhattan Project's "indispensable man."
