= John Mulchaey =

American astrophysicist and astronomer

John S. Mulchaey

Academic background
- Education: University of California, Berkeley (BS); University of Maryland, College Park (PhD)
- Doctoral advisor: Andrew Stephen Wilson

Academic work
- Discipline: Astrophysics
- Institutions: Carnegie Institution for Science; Space Telescope Science Institute

John S. Mulchaey is an American astrophysicist and astronomer. He is the 12th president of the Carnegie Institution for Science.

== Education ==
Mulchaey earned a Bachelor of Science in astrophysics from the University of California, Berkeley and a Ph.D. in astrophysics from the University of Maryland, College Park.

== Career ==
Mulchaey joined Carnegie Science as a postdoctoral fellow after a graduate student fellowship at the Space Telescope Science Institute. At the conclusion of his fellowship, he received a staff scientist appointment. Mulchaey was named director of the Carnegie Observatories in 2015 after five years as associate director for academic affairs. He also served as Deputy for Science. He was appointed President of Carnegie Science in November 2024.

Early in his career, Mulchaey led the research group that revolutionized our understanding of galaxy groups by revealing the existence of large amounts of dark matter in their compositions. More recently, he was part of the teams that discovered the first known binary quasar system and that first watched a fast radio burst in real time.

As director, Mulchaey oversaw the Carnegie Observatories' main campus in Pasadena, California, as well as the Las Campanas Observatory in Chile. He also serves on the board of the next-generation Giant Magellan Telescope, which is under construction at Carnegie's facility in Chile.

Mulchaey is well regarded for his work on groups and clusters of galaxies—most of which, including our own Milky Way, exist collectively. These systems can be important laboratories for studying the processes that shape galaxies throughout their lifetimes, from their formation through their evolution.

In addition to his research efforts, Mulchaey is involved in public outreach and educational activities, including the annual Carnegie Observatories Open House and the Astronomy Lecture Series at the Huntington Library. In 2020, he received the Helios Award, part of the Rotary of Sierra Madre's Humanitarian STAR Awards program, for his achievements in scientific education.

Mulchaey has appeared frequently in the media, including the Today Show, Fox News Channel, NBC 5 Dallas-Ft. Worth., WFAA, Fox 4 Dallas-Ft. Worth, CNN, the New York Times, the Los Angeles Times, NPR, Dallas News, Pasadena Weekly, Astronomy Magazine, and Discover Magazine. He has also appeared at festivals including South by Southwest.
