= Andrew Stephen Wilson =

Astronomer and university professor

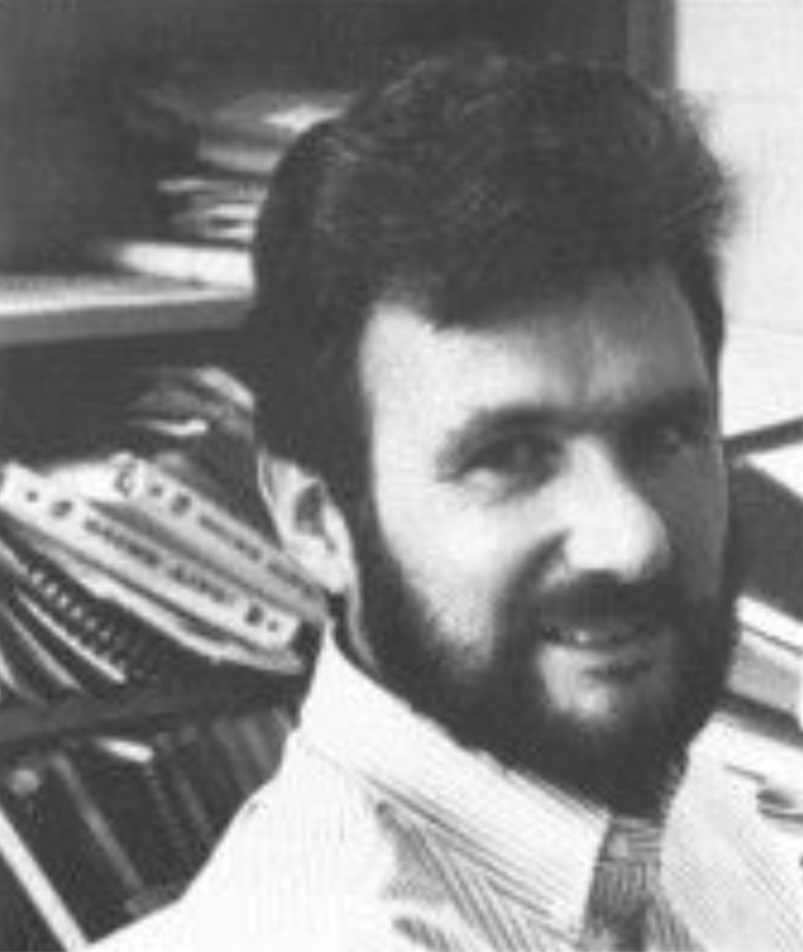
- Born: 26 March 1947; Doncaster, Yorkshire, England, UK
- Died: 24 May 2008 (aged 61); Silver Spring, Maryland, U.S.
- Education: University of Cambridge, University of Sussex and University of Maryland
- Known for: Being one of the first scientists of his generation to use multi-wavelength
- Spouse: Kaija Kettunen
- Children: Daniel and Coraline
- Scientific career
- Fields: Astronomy and university professor
- Workplaces: NASA and university of Maryland
- Academic advisors: Martin Ryle
- Doctoral students: John Mulchaey; Kim Weaver

Andrew Stephen Wilson (26 March 1947 – 24 May 2008) was an astronomer from Doncaster, Yorkshire. He earned a doctorate in physics from the University of Cambridge.

== Early life ==
Wilson was born on 26 March 1947 in Doncaster, Yorkshire, He was the youngest of two brothers. His father, Norman, came from a wealthy family who were coal merchants. His mother, Mary was one of seven siblings, and learned the skills of a French polisher and later became a teacher.

When he was four, his family moved to Skipton where he attended school until the age of eleven and enrolled in Ermysted's Grammar School. Wilson's interest in astronomy grew and when someone donated a four-inch refracting telescope to the school, Wilson and his friends borrowed it to look at the rings of Saturn, the moons of Jupiter and many nebulae. Wilson joined the astronomy club in his school.

== Career ==
Wilson obtained his bachelor's degree in the Cavendish laboratory in the University of Cambridge and worked for Nobel Prize winner in physical Martin Ryle. After he gained his PhD, became a post-doctoral at Leiden Observatory and then went to the Astronomy Centre in the University of Sussex in England.

Wilson left England for the University of Maryland in the United States and he worked with NASA and for the university for the rest of his career.

In the 1970s to 1980s, he pioneered the uses of radio telescopes to study the active galactic nuclei. Wilson become an avid proponent of two of NASA's orbiting observatories, the Hubble Space Telescope and Chandra X-ray Observatory. At NASA, he was among the interdisciplinary scientists and become a member of the Science Working Group in the Chandra X-ray Observatory.

After improvements in technology, Wilson started to do experiments to simulate the environment of black holes, The experiments were successful and Wilson described that environment with unprecedented detail, which led Wilson to receive a secondary research group that he supervised. Then this research group started to work on nearby radio galaxies like Cygnus A, M87 and Pictor A and Seyfert galaxy like The circinus galaxy, NGC 1068, NGC 4151 and NGC 4258.

== Legacy ==
Wilson was described as "one of the first truly multi-wavelength astronomers of his generation" and "a scientist of extraordinary productivity and impact over his lifetime".

== Personal life ==
After he graduated from the University of Cambridge, he visited London for a short period of time where he met Kaija Kettunen. They were married in her hometown of Lieksa, Finland in 1975. They had two children.

== See also ==
- X-ray astronomy
- X-shaped radio galaxy
- List of spiral DRAGNs
- List of radio telescopes
- Radar astronomy
