= Carnegie Institution for Science =

American non-profit research organization

- Carnegie Science logo
- Founder: Andrew Carnegie
- Established: January 29, 1902; 124 years ago
- Mission: To advance investigation, research, and discovery, and apply that knowledge for the improvement of humankind.
- Focus: Scientific research in astronomy, Earth and planetary science, and biology
- President: John Mulchaey
- Location: 5241 Broad Branch Road, N.W., Washington, DC, USA
- Website: www.carnegiescience.edu

Carnegie Science, also known as Carnegie Institution for Science and formerly the Carnegie Institution of Washington, is an independent, nonprofit organization established in 1902 to fund and perform scientific research. The institution is headquartered in Washington, D.C. Its three interdisciplinary scientific divisions focus on life and environmental science, Earth and planetary science, and astronomy and astrophysics.

In 2024, expenses for scientific programs and administration totaled approximately $110 million. As of June 30, 2025, the institution's investment portfolio was valued at approximately $986 million. The current president is American astronomer and astrophysicist John Mulchaey, whose official term began in November 2024.

== Name ==
In 2024, "Carnegie Institution for Science" officially adopted the name "Carnegie Science", a name which has been used informally since 2007 when they first changed the name from "Carnegie Institution of Washington" to "Carnegie Institution for Science." The institution's legal name remains "Carnegie Institution of Washington."

The institution’s three scientific divisions are named (1) Carnegie Science Biosphere Science & Engineering, (2) Carnegie Science Earth & Planets Laboratory, and (3) Carnegie Science Observatories.

More than 20 independent organizations were established through the philanthropy of Andrew Carnegie and feature his surname. Carnegie Science is unaffiliated with these other organizations, including the Carnegie Science Center in Pittsburgh and Carnegie Mellon University.

== History ==
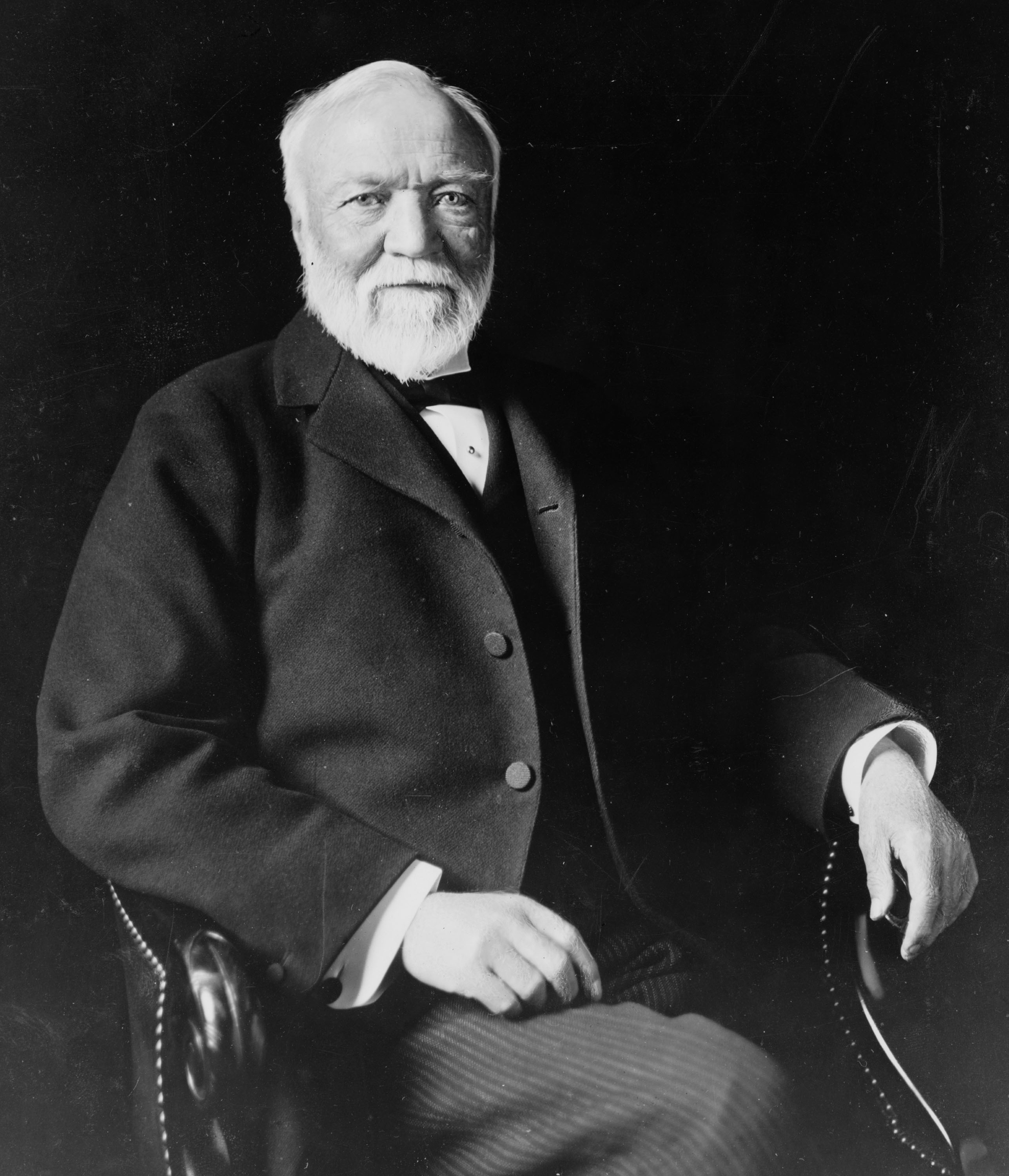
Andrew Carnegie

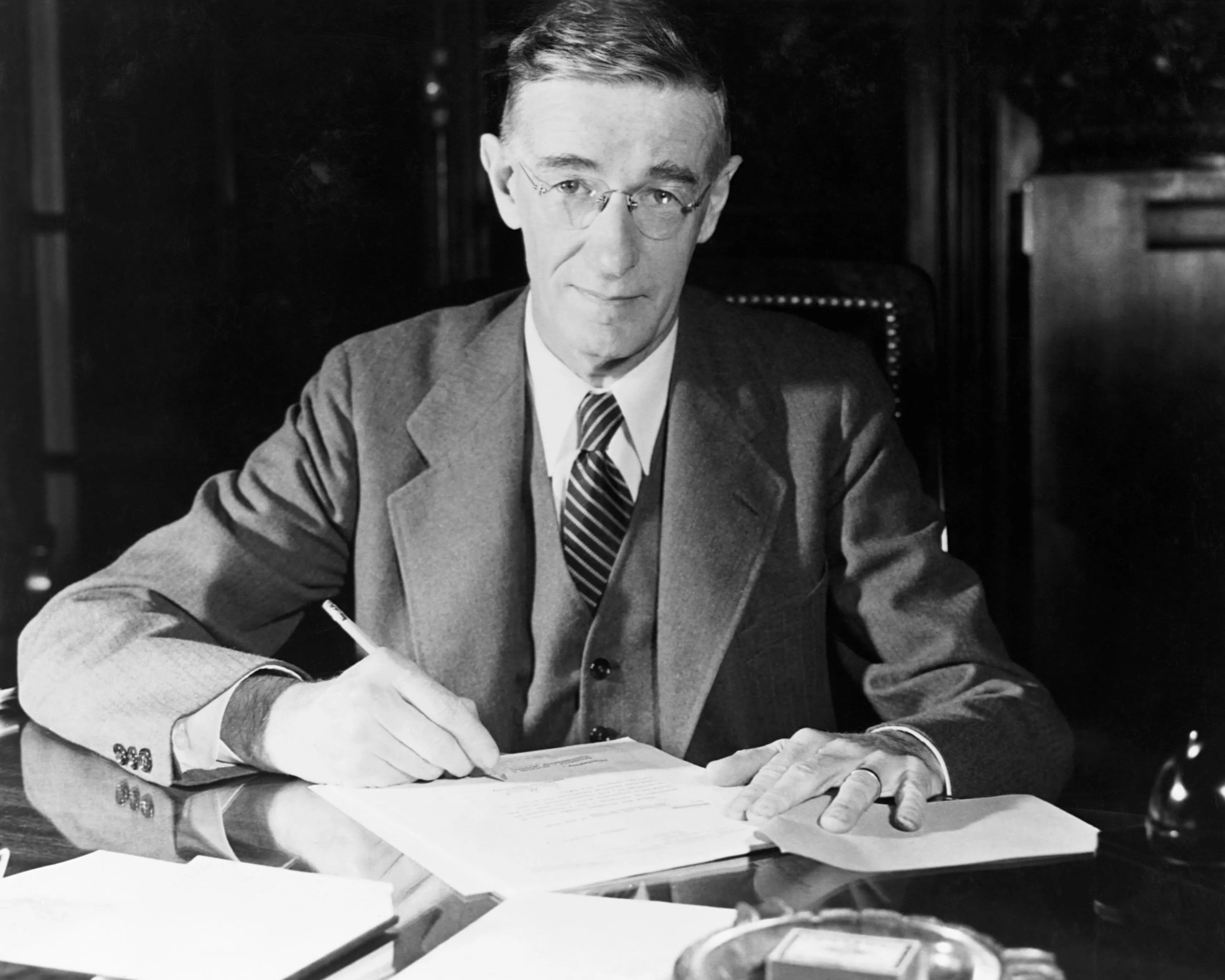
Vannevar Bush

It is proposed to found in the city of Washington, an institution which ... shall in the broadest and most liberal manner encourage investigation, research, and discovery [and] show the application of knowledge to the improvement of mankind.

—Andrew Carnegie, January 28, 1902

Founded on January 29, 1902, through a $10 million endowment from industrialist and philanthropist Andrew Carnegie, the Carnegie Institution of Washington was established to promote original scientific research and discovery. The institution initially supported both individual investigators and institutional research. Over time, the institution shifted away from funding external researchers and focused on conducting research through its own laboratories and departments. Within its first decade, the institution had established ten major research departments, including the Desert Laboratory, the Department of Terrestrial Magnetism, the Geophysical Laboratory, and Mount Wilson Observatory, laying the foundation for its modern scientific programs.

When the United States joined World War II, Vannevar Bush was president of the Carnegie Institution of Washington. Several months prior to June 12, 1940, Bush persuaded President Franklin Roosevelt to create the National Defense Research Committee (later superseded by the Office of Scientific Research and Development) to coordinate the nation's scientific war effort. Bush housed the new agency in the Carnegie Institution's administrative headquarters at 16th and P Streets, Northwest, in Washington, D.C., converting its rotunda and auditorium into office cubicles. From this location, Bush supervised multiple projects, including the Manhattan Project. Carnegie scientists assisted with the development of the proximity fuze and mass production of penicillin.

== Research ==
Carnegie Science is composed of three scientific divisions on the East and West Coasts that center on life and environmental science, Earth and planetary science, and astronomy and astrophysics: Biosphere Sciences & Engineering, Earth & Planets Laboratory, and Observatories. In addition to facilities in the United States, Carnegie Science manages the Las Campanas Observatory in Chile.

=== Life and Environmental Sciences ===
Carnegie Science’s life and environmental science research activities are currently housed under the institution's Biosphere Sciences & Engineering Division located in Pasadena in association with Caltech. Research areas at this division include global ecology, symbiosis and nested ecosystems, and plant and algal research.

Life and environmental science research activities were historically housed under departments, including the Department of Embryology, located on the Johns Hopkins University campus in Baltimore, MD and the Department of Plant Biology and Department of Global Ecology, located on the Stanford University campus in Palo Alto, CA.

The former Department of Plant Biology began as the Desert Laboratory in Tucson, Arizona 1903 to study desert plants in their natural habitats. The department employed early ecologists Forrest Shreve and Frederic Clements and the Desert Lab became a nexus for early work in ecology. Over time and with the move to the Stanford campus, research at the department evolved to the study of photosynthesis.

Among its notable staff members are Nobel laureates Andrew Fire, Alfred Hershey, and Barbara McClintock.

=== Earth & Planetary Science ===
In 2020, the Department of Terrestrial Magnetism and Geophysical Laboratory merged to become the Earth and Planets Laboratory, located on the organization's Broad Branch Road campus in Washington, D.C. The Department of Terrestrial Magnetism was founded in 1904 and used two ships for magnetic observations around the world: the Galilee was chartered in 1905, but it was unsuitable; later, Carnegie was built in 1909 and completed seven cruises to measure the Earth's magnetic field before it suffered an explosion and burned. The Geophysical Laboratory was founded in 1905 and originally conducted experimental research on rock and mineral formation and the Earth's interior.

Research areas at the Earth & Planets Laboratory today include astrobiology, cosmochemistry, experimental petrology, extreme environments, extreme materials, geochemistry, geophysics & geodynamics, mineralogy & mineral physics, and exoplanets.

=== Astronomy & Astrophysics ===
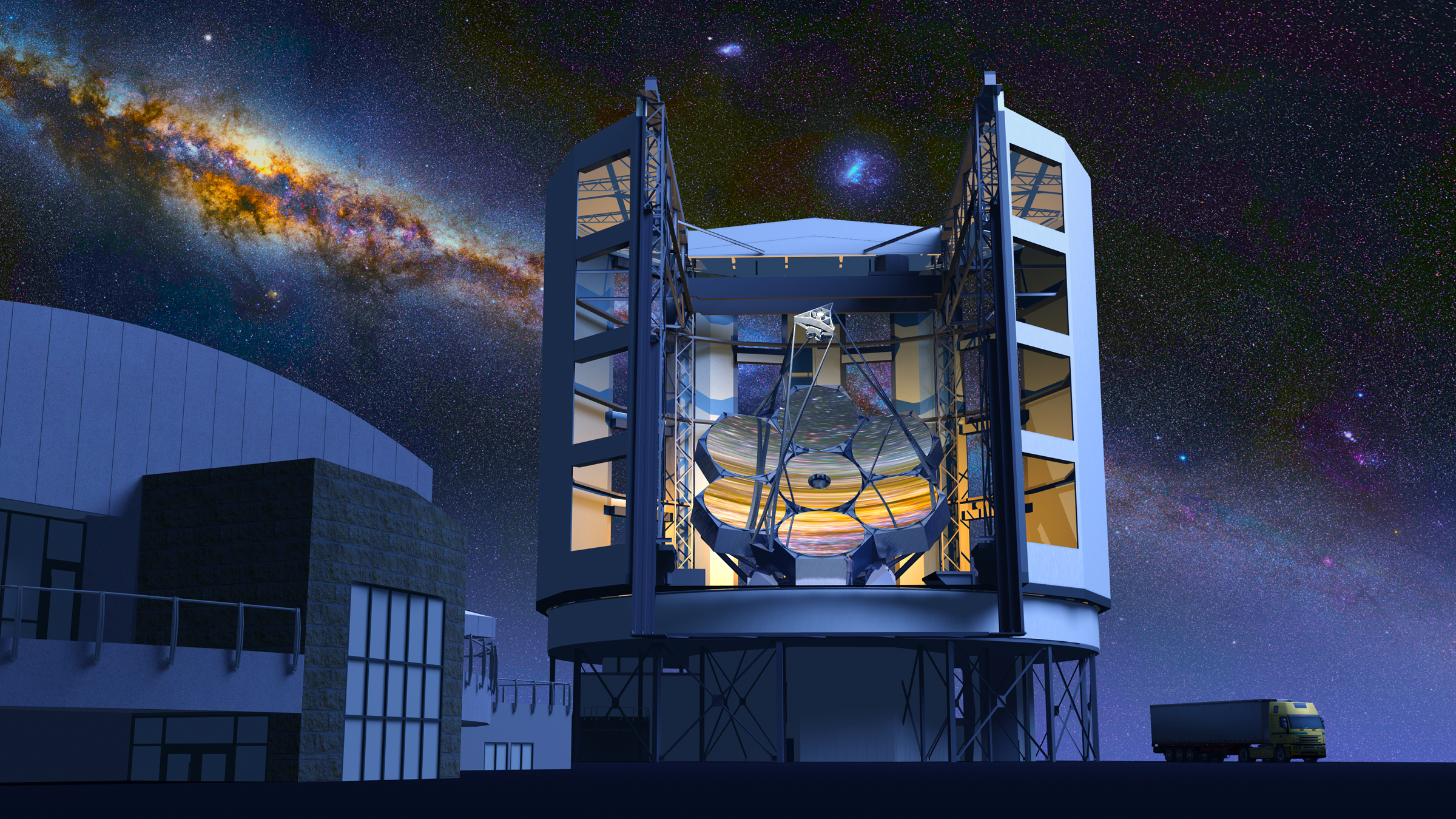
Giant Magellan Telescope, artist's rendering

The Carnegie Science Observatories were founded in 1904 as the Mount Wilson Observatory. The institution funded the historic Hooker 100-inch telescope envisioned by George Ellery Hale on which Carnegie astronomer Edwin Hubble captured the famous “VAR!” plate in 1923, discovering that the universe extends far beyond the Milky Way Galaxy. In 1929, Hubble went on to prove that the universe is continually expanding.

As Los Angeles encroached more on Mount Wilson, day-to-day operations of the observatory there were transferred by Carnegie Science to the Mount Wilson Institute in 1986. Today, Carnegie astronomers operate from offices in Pasadena and from the Las Campanas Observatory in Chile’s Atacama region established in 1969. The Las Campanas Observatory is home to the twin 6.5-meter Magellan Telescopes, 2.5-meter Irénée du Pont telescope, and 1.0-meter Swope telescope. It is also the site of the future Giant Magellan Telescope.

Research areas at the Observatories today include cosmology, star and galaxy formation, transient objects, the Milky Way, exoplanets, and instrument development and engineering.

== Notable Scientists ==
=== Nobel Prize Winners ===
- Thomas Hunt Morgan - Nobel Prize in Prize in Physiology or Medicine in 1933 for discoveries elucidating the role that the chromosome plays in heredity.
- Alfred Hershey - Shared Nobel Prize in Physiology or Medicine in 1969 for work with bacteriophages.
- Barbara McClintock - Nobel Prize in Physiology or Medicine in 1983 for discovery of transposons, or “jumping genes”.
- Andrew Fire - Shared Nobel Prize in Physiology or Medicine in 2006 for the discovery of RNA interference (RNAi).

=== National Medal of Science Winners ===
- Vannevar Bush - National Medal of Science in Engineering, 1963
- Allan Sandage - National Medal of Science in the Physical Sciences, 1970
- Philip Abelson - National Medal of Science in the Physical Sciences,1987
- Maxine Singer - National Medal of Science in the Biological Sciences, 1992
- Vera Rubin - National Medal of Science in the Physical Sciences, 1993
- George Wetherill - National Medal of Science in the Physical Sciences, 1997
- Nina Fedoroff - National Medal of Science in the Biological Sciences, 2007
- Sean Solomon - National Medal of Science in the Physical Sciences, 2012

=== Other Major Award Winners ===
- Joseph G. Gall - Lasker Award, 2006
- Mark M. Phillips - Gruber Prize in Cosmology, 2007 and Breakthrough Prize, 2015
- Wendy Freeman - Gruber Prize in Cosmology, 2009
- Donald Brown - Lasker-Koshland Award, 2012
- Richard Carlson - Arthur L. Day Medal, 2013 and Victor Moritz Goldschmidt Award, 2020
- Allan Spradling - March of Dimes and Richard B. Johnston, Jr., MD Prize in Developmental Biology, 2018
- Marilyn Fogel - Victor Moritz Goldschmidt Award, 2022
- Chris Field - Japan Prize, 2022
- Sara Seager - Kavli Prize in Astrophysics, 2024

== Administration ==
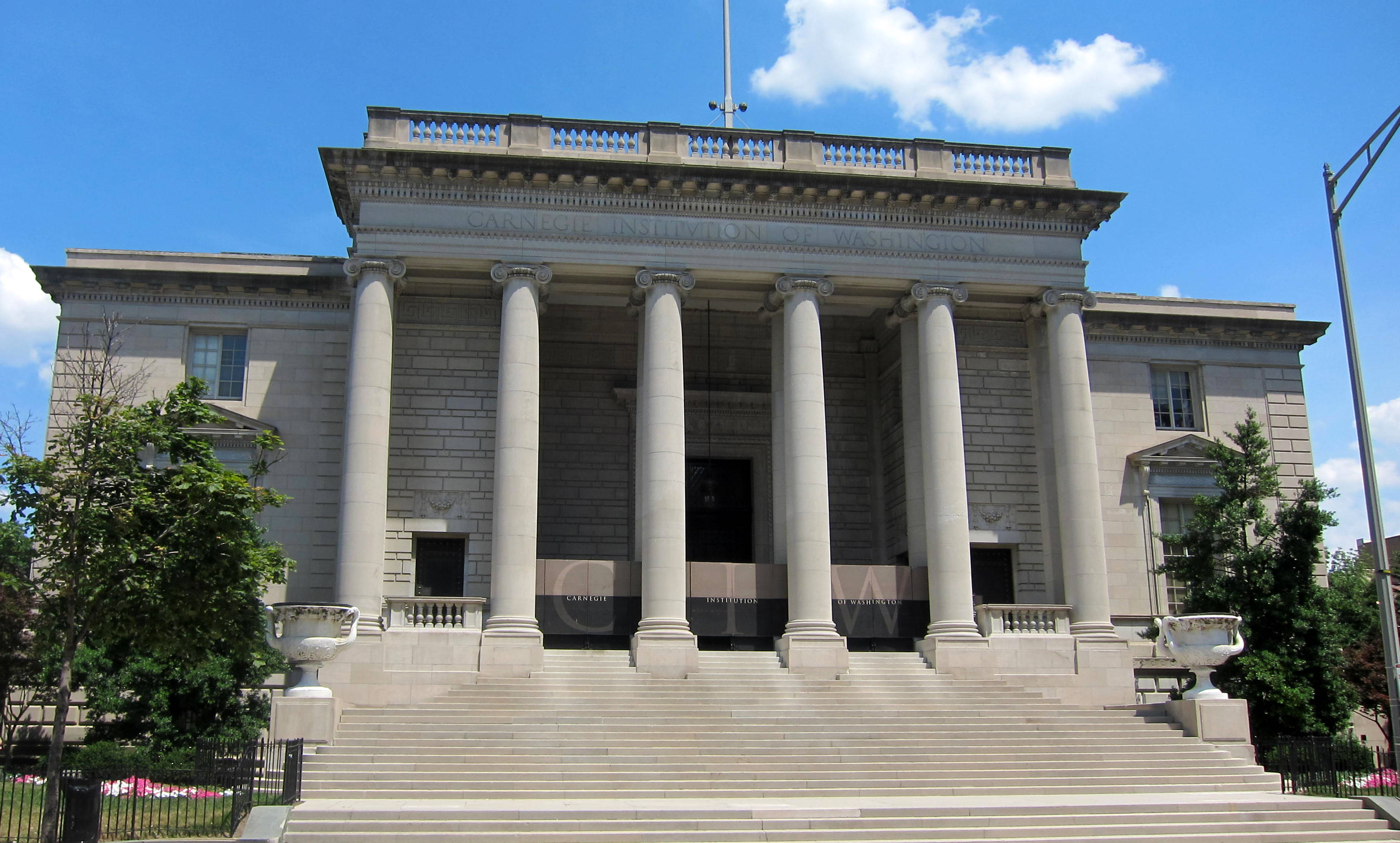
Former administrative headquarters of the Carnegie Institution for Science in Washington, D.C.

The Carnegie Institution's administrative offices were located at 1530 P St., Northwest, Washington, D.C., at the corner of 16th and P Streets until 2020. The building housed the offices of the president, administration and finance, publications, and advancement. In 2020, the administrative building was sold to the government of Qatar to be used as its embassy.

Since 2020 Carnegie Science's administrative offices have been located at its Broad Branch Road campus in Northwest D.C., which is also the home of the Earth & Planets Laboratory.

== Presidents ==
John Mulchaey, an American astronomer and astrophysicist, is the institution's 12th president. The following persons have served as president of the Carnegie Institution for Science:

No.	Image	President	Start	End	Notes
1		Daniel Coit Gilman	1902	1904	
2		Robert S. Woodward	1904	1920	
3		John C. Merriam	1921	1938	
4		Vannevar Bush	1939	1955	
5		Caryl P. Haskins	1956	1971	
6		Philip Abelson	1971	1978	
7		James D. Ebert	1978	1987	
Acting		Edward E. David, Jr.	1987	1988	
8		Maxine F. Singer	1988	2002	
Acting		Michael E. Gellert	January 2003	April 2003	
9		Richard Meserve	April 2003	August 31, 2014	
10		Matthew P. Scott	September 1, 2014	December 31, 2017	
Interim		John Mulchaey and Yixian Zheng	January 1, 2018	July 1, 2018	Co-Presidents
11		Eric D. Isaacs	July 2, 2018	October 3, 2024	
Interim		John Mulchaey	October 3, 2024	November 22, 2024	
12		John Mulchaey	November 22, 2024	present	

== Carnegie Academy for Science Education and First Light ==
In 1989, Carnegie President Maxine Singer founded Carnegie Academy for Science Education and First Light (CASE), a free Saturday science program for middle school students. The program teaches hands-on learning in science.

== Partnerships ==
Carnegie Science and Caltech formalized a partnership to advance life and environmental sciences research in Pasadena in 2023.

Carnegie Science is a founding partner of the international consortium of research institutions constructing the Giant Magellan Telescope at the institution's Las Campanas Observatory in Chile.

== Eugenics Record Office ==
In 1910, the Eugenics Record Office was founded in Cold Spring Harbor, New York by Charles Davenport with funding from Mrs. E.H. Harriman, John Harvey Kellogg, and the American Breeders' Association. The Eugenic Records Office became a center for pseudoscientific research of eugenics. In 1918, the Eugenics Record Office was donated to Carnegie Institution of Washington, whose Station for Experimental Evolution founded in 1904 to “study heredity and evolution through breeding experiments with plants and animals” was also headed by Davenport and located in Cold Spring Harbor. The Carnegie Institution of Washington funded the Eugenics Records Office until 1939 when it closed the department. The department's records were retained in a university library.

In 2020, Carnegie Institution for Science issued a statement acknowledging and apologizing for the institution's past involvement in eugenics research.

== See also ==
- Kurt Adelberger
