= Alice E. Shapley =

American astronomer

Alice Eve Shapley is an astronomer at the University of California, Los Angeles (UCLA). She was one of the discoverers of the spiral galaxy BX442.

== Education ==
Shapley received a degree in astronomy, astrophysics, and physics at Harvard and Radcliffe Colleges in 1997, and a Ph.D. in astronomy at the California Institute of Technology in 2003. Her PhD was on the properties of Lyman-break galaxies.

== Research areas ==
Shapley's research areas are galaxy formation and evolution, the feedback processes in starburst galaxies, stellar populations at high redshift, and the evolution of the inter-galactic medium at high redshift. Through her research she has acquired over $5 million in research funding.

== Employment ==
Since 2013, Shapley has held the position of department of physics and astronomy professor. From 2003 to 2005 while at the University of California at Berkley she was a Miller Postdoctoral Fellow. She has also held the position of Associate Professor in the Department of Physics and Astronomy from 2005 to 2008, as well as Assistant Professor in the Department of Astrophysical Sciences from 2008 to 2013. She has also spent time teaching at Princeton in the areas of astronomy and physics.

== Publications ==
Shapley has been a co-author on over 400 scientific papers. She is the primary author of over 80 papers.

== Awards and honors ==
- 1997, Leo Goldberg Prize, Harvard
- 1997-1998, Virginia Gilloon Fellowship, California Institute of Technology
- 1998-2001, NSF Graduate Research Fellowship
- 2006–2008, Alfred P. Sloan Research Fellowship
- 2006–2011, David and Lucile Packard Fellowship
- 2009–2010, Member of "Galaxies Across Cosmic Time" Science Frontier Panel for Astro2010 Decadal Survey
- 2010, McMaster Cosmology Lecture, University of Toledo
- 2011, 2013, 2016, 2017, 2018, 2020, UCLA Department of Physics and Astronomy Teaching Award
- 2012, UCLA Department of Physics and Astronomy Teacher of the Year
- 2014, Marc Aaronson Memorial Lecture, University of Arizona
- 2016, Distinguished Women Scholar Series Lecturer, University of Victoria
- 2018, Biermann Lecturer, Max Planck Institute for Astrophysics
- 2019, Kavli Lecturer, American Astronomical Society Meeting
- 2019-2020, Nominated Participant, UCLA Faculty Leadership Academy
- 2021, Elected Fellow of the American Physical Society
- 2022, 132nd Faculty Research Lecturer, UCLA
- 2025, Fellow of the American Astronomical Society
