= Natascha Förster Schreiber =

Canadian-German astronomer

Natascha M. Förster Schreiber
- Born: Canada
- Education: Université de Montréal
- Scientific career
- Fields: Astronomy
- Workplaces: Max Planck Institute for Extraterrestrial Physics
- Thesis: Near infrared imaging spectroscopy and mid-infrared spectroscopy of M82: revealing the nature of star formation activity in the archetypal starburst galaxy (1999)
- Doctoral advisor: Reinhard Genzel, Linda Tacconi

Natascha M. Förster Schreiber is an astronomer specializing in near-infrared spectroscopy of near and far galaxies. Born in Canada, and educated in Canada and Germany, she has worked in France, The Netherlands, and Germany. She is a researcher at the Max Planck Institute for Extraterrestrial Physics in Garching, Germany, near Munich.

== Education and career ==
Förster Schreiber is originally from Canada and grew up near Montreal, where she became interested in astronomy through a summer program in high school. She completed a bachelor's degree in mathematics and physics at the Université de Montréal in 1992, and continued there for a master's degree in physics in 1995. Her master's thesis, jointly supervised by Daniel Nadeau and René Doyon, concerned infrared observations of Messier 82. Next, she went to the Max Planck Institute for Extraterrestrial Physics (MPE) and LMU Munich in Germany for doctoral study in astrophysics. Continuing her work on M82, she completed a doctorate (Dr. rer. nat.) in 1999. Her dissertation, Near infrared imaging spectroscopy and mid-infrared spectroscopy of M82: revealing the nature of star formation activity in the archetypal starburst galaxy, was advised by Nobel Laureate Reinhard Genzel; and Linda Tacconi as a co-advisor.

She became a postdoctoral researcher in France, at the Direction des Sciences et de la Matière of CEA Paris-Saclay, from 1998 to 2000, and then in The Netherlands, at the Leiden Observatory, from 2000 to 2004. She joined the Max Planck Institute for Extraterrestrial Physics as a research associate in 2004, and became a tenured senior scientist there in 2013.

== Research ==
After early work on starburst galaxies such as M82, Förster Schreiber's research interests shifted to high-redshift galaxies, which provide a view of the universe at a much earlier time in its evolution. Her observations include both in-depth studies of individual galaxies and large-scale surveys of many galaxies. Through this work, she has found an unexpectedly rapid maturation of galaxies, producing a high population of massive and quenched galaxies and well-structured spiral galaxies in the early universe, and investigated the effects of galactic superwinds on star formation. Her contributions also include work on the instrumentation needed for these observations, including the Extremely Large Telescope under construction in Chile for the European Southern Observatory.

== Recognition ==
Förster Schreiber's research at the Max Planck Institute for Extraterrestrial Physics was funded from 2004 to 2008 by a Balzan Fellowship, and from 2008 to 2012 by a Minerva Fellowship of the Max Planck Society. In 2019 she was given an honorary doctorate by the University of Bath in England. In 2022, she won a highly endowed and competitive five-year Advanced Grant from the European Research Council to pursue innovative research on the evolution of distant galaxies.
