= Charles C. Steidel =

American astronomer

- Born: October 14, 1962 (age 63); Ithaca, New York, US
- Education: Princeton University; California Institute of Technology
- Awards: Gruber Cosmology Prize (2010); MacArthur Fellows Program (2002); Helen B. Warner Prize for Astronomy (1997)
- Scientific career
- Fields: astronomy
- Workplaces: California Institute of Technology

Charles C. Steidel (born October 14, 1962) is an American astronomer, and Lee A. DuBridge Professor of Astronomy at California Institute of Technology.

== Life ==
He graduated from Princeton University with an AB in Astrophysical Sciences, and from California Institute of Technology with a PhD in Astronomy, in 1990. On November 7, 1987, he married Sarah Nichols Hoyt.

== Awards ==
- 2010 Gruber Cosmology Prize from The Peter and Patricia Gruber Foundation in recognition of his revolutionary studies of the most distant galaxies in the universe
- 2002 MacArthur Fellows Program

== Works ==
- "The Structure and Kinematics of the Circum-Galactic Medium from Far-UV Spectra of z~2-3 Galaxies", Cosmology and Extragalactic Astrophysics, Authors: C. C. Steidel, D. K. Erb, A. E. Shapley, M. Pettini, N. A. Reddy, M. Bogosavljević, G. C. Rudie, O. Rakic
