= Norman Jarosik =

American astrophysicist

Norman C. Jarosik is a US astrophysicist. He has worked on the Wilkinson Microwave Anisotropy Probe (WMAP) whose observations of Cosmic Microwave Background Radiation (CMBR) have provided significant insights into cosmology.

Jarosik studied physics at the State University of New York in Buffalo, receiving his doctorate in 1986. After two years at Bell Laboratories he began work at Princeton University, where as of 2018 he holds the position of Senior Research Physicist/Lecturer.

At Princeton, Jarosik specializes in measurements of CMBR from both ground-based and high-altitude probes. He was a member of the WMAP science team where he worked on the design, construction and testing of the microwave radiometer systems and contributed to the calibration and analysis of flight data. He is also involved with the Atacama Cosmology Telescope.

== Awards ==
Jarosik was awarded the 2018 Breakthrough Prize in Fundamental Physics together with Charles L. Bennett, Gary Hinshaw, Lyman Page Jr., David Spergel and the WMAP research team. The Prize was $3,000,000 split amongst the researchers. Princeton University President Christopher L. Eisgruber stated that Jarosik and his team's "Research has transformed our understanding of the age, shape, and evolution of the universe."
