= Gary Hinshaw =

American cosmologist

Gary F. Hinshaw (born in San Rafael, California) is a cosmologist and physics professor at the University of British Columbia. Hinshaw worked on the Wilkinson Microwave Anisotropy Probe (WMAP) whose observations of Cosmic Microwave Background (CMB) have provided significant insights into cosmology. He holds both US and Canadian citizenship.

Hinshaw studied physics as an undergraduate at the University of California, Berkeley. In 1987 he obtained his doctorate from Harvard University and joined Oberlin College as an assistant professor. Starting in 1990, he worked as an astrophysicist at NASA's Goddard Space Flight Center. He accepted a professorship at the University of British Columbia in 2011. He has been involved with both the COBE and WMAP satellite missions to investigate CMB radiation. He leads data analysis efforts at WMAP, and is responsible for the Legacy Archive (LAMBDA) that makes CMB missions data available to other scientists. He is one of the lead scientists in the Canadian Hydrogen Intensity Mapping Experiment (known as CHIME).

== Awards ==
Hinshaw was awarded the 2018 Breakthrough Prize in Fundamental Physics together with Charles L. Bennett, Norman Jarosik, Lyman Page Jr., David Spergel and the WMAP research team. Hinshaw has also received Goddard's Space Science Achievement Award.
