= J. Anthony Tyson =

American physicist and astronomer (born 1940)

- Born: John Anthony Tyson; 1940 (age 85–86)
- Education: Stanford University (BS); University of Wisconsin (PhD)
- Known for: Weak gravitational lensing
- Awards: Aaronson Memorial Prize (1969); Nature's 10 (2025)
- Scientific career
- Fields: Astronomy
- Workplaces: University of California, Davis
- Website: tyson.ucdavis.edu

John Anthony Tyson (known also as Tony Tyson; born 1940) is an American physicist, cosmologist, and astronomer, professor of University of California, Davis, and chief scientist of the Vera C. Rubin Observatory. He pioneered the technique of weak gravitational lensing.

== Education ==
Tyson received his bachelor's degree from Stanford University in 1962. During his undergraduate years, he worked as a research assistant at Stanford University's Applied Electronics Laboratory from 1959 to 1962 and at the Stanford Linear Accelerator Center in 1962. He received a Master of Science degree in physics in 1964 and completed his Ph.D. in physics in 1967 from the University of Wisconsin.

His doctoral research was conducted with additional affiliation with the University of Chicago, where he carried out thesis research and worked at the Institute for the Study of Metals. His doctoral dissertation, The Superfluid Transition in Liquid He4; The Critical Region, was completed in 1967 under the supervision of R. N. Dexter at the University of Wisconsin and D. H. Douglass Jr. at the University of Chicago. Following completion of his doctorate, he was a postdoc from 1967 to 1969 at the University of Chicago.

During this period, he also served as a research associate at the James Franck Institute and held visiting lecturer positions at the University of Sussex and the Hebrew University of Jerusalem from 1968 to 1969

== Career ==
=== Bell Laboratories ===
Tyson joined Bell Laboratories in 1969 as a Member of the Technical Staff and later became a Distinguished Member of the Technical Staff. In 1985 he became a distinguished member of the technical staff at Bell Laboratories until 2004. During a sabbatical period in 1976–1977, he worked at the University of California, Berkeley. During this period, he worked on experimental physics, gravitational waves, and astronomical imaging, including the application of charge-coupled devices (CCDs) to astronomy. He developed observational techniques for measuring distortions in distant galaxy images caused by foreground mass concentrations, producing the first images of dark matter.

In addition to his research activities, Tyson held several scientific advisory and leadership roles during this period. He served on committees related to astronomical instrumentation, telescope development, national astronomy planning, and scientific policy, including roles with the National Science Foundation, the National Research Council, the National Optical Astronomy Observatory, and other scientific organizations.

In the late 1970s he applied CCDs to astronomy, discovering the faint blue galaxies. Using these distant galaxies he made the first maps of dark matter using weak gravitational lensing. Tyson built the Big Throughput Camera, which was used to discover dark energy. In the 1990s he started a project to build a next generation sky survey, and directed the project for 15 years.

=== University of California, Davis and LSST ===
Tyson joined the University of California, Davis, in 2004 as a Distinguished Professor of Physics. His research has focused on observational cosmology, astronomical instrumentation, and methods for analyzing large astronomical datasets.

He was the founding director of the Large Synoptic Survey Telescope (LSST) project from 2003 to 2013 and served as LSST chief scientist from 2013 to 2019. The project later became the Vera C. Rubin Observatory and its Legacy Survey of Space and Time (LSST). Tyson has served as chief scientist for the Rubin Observatory since 2019.

The LSST is designed to conduct a wide-field survey of the sky using a large 3 gigapixel digital camera and repeated observations to study areas including cosmology, transient astronomical events, and objects in the Solar System. Over 1000 exposures per night for ten years, cycling through six color filters, creates a digital color motion picture of the universe. About 8 million alerts per night are issued within 2 minutes of closing the camera shutter for any object that changes brightness or moves on the sky.

== Honors and awards ==
- 1970: Gravity Research Foundation Essay Award.
- 1984: Elected Fellow, American Physical Society
- 1985: Distinguished Member of the Technical Staff Award, AT&T Bell Laboratories.
- 1985: IR 100 Award, Industrial Research
- 1996: Aaronson Memorial Prize
- 1997: Elected Fellow, American Academy of Arts and Sciences
- 1997: Elected a Member of the National Academy of Sciences
- 1998: Scott Lecturer, Cavendish Laboratory, Cambridge University
- 1998: Hon. D.Sc., University of Chicago
- 1999: APS Centennial Speaker
- 2000: Elected a Member of the American Philosophical Society
- 2012: Hintze Lecturer, Oxford University.
- 2017: Included in the Smithsonian Permanent Cosmology Exhibit.
- 2022: Asteroid 179223 Tonytyson, discovered by astronomers with the Sloan Digital Sky Survey in 2001, was named in his honor. The official naming citation was published by IAU's WGSBN on 7 February 2022.
- 2022: Selected as "One to watch in 2023" by Nature's 10.
- 2025: Named "Telescope pioneer" by Nature's 10.

== Selected publications ==
Tyson has authored and co-authored hundreds of scientific publications, conference proceedings, technical papers, and research reports covering experimental physics, astronomical instrumentation, gravitational waves, galaxy evolution, gravitational lensing, dark matter, cosmology, and large-scale astronomical surveys.
