= Marc Aaronson Memorial Lectureship =

University of Arizona Department of Astronomy award

The Marc Aaronson Memorial Lectureship, also known as the Aaronson Prize, is an award of the University of Arizona Department of Astronomy and Steward Observatory which promotes and recognizes excellence in astronomical research. It is named after astronomer Marc Aaronson, who died in 1987 in an accident while making astronomical observations. He was 36 years old.

== Background ==
The lectureship and cash prize are awarded every eighteen months to an individual or group who, by his or her passion for research and dedication to excellence, has produced a body of work in observational astronomy which has resulted in a significant deepening of our understanding of the universe. Any living scientist is eligible for this award without consideration of race, sex, or nationality. Fourteen previous Aaronson Prize winners are returning to Tucson on Apr 3–4, 2017, for a scientific symposium in Marc's honor.

Aaronson came to Steward Observatory as a postdoc after receiving his PhD degree from Harvard in 1977 and became an associate professor in 1983. His astronomical research focused on many of the most important problems of observational cosmology: the cosmic distance scale, the age of the Universe, the large-scale motion of matter, and the distribution of invisible mass in the Universe. Aaronson made important contributions to the understanding of stellar populations in the Large Magellanic Cloud. In recognition of his research achievements, Aaronson was awarded the George Van Biesbroeck Award by the University of Arizona in 1981, the Bart J. Bok Prize by Harvard University in 1983, and the Newton Lacy Pierce Prize by the American Astronomical Society in 1984.

== Recipients ==
Source: University of Arizona

Year	Recipient	Award Citation
1989	Robert Kirshner	For studies of supernovae, supernova remnants, and the large-scale distribution of galaxies
1990	Ken Freeman	TBD
1992	John Huchra	For surveys that led to the discovery of large-scale structure in the distribution of galaxies
1993	Nick Scoville	TBD
1994	Wendy Freedman	For a decade of fundamental contributions to the areas of the extragalactic distance scale and the stellar populations of galaxies
1996	J. Anthony Tyson	In recognition of his use of new technologies to make pioneering contributions in observational cosmology
1998	John C. Mather	For the conception, design, and execution of a seminal cosmological observation, the measurement of the infrared background with the COBE satellite
1999	Bohdan Paczyński	For his theories of gamma-ray bursts and for his work on microlensing
2001	Ewine van Dishoeck	For her comprehensive attack on the problem of chemical evolution of star-forming regions
2002	Geoffrey Marcy	For his pioneering work on low-mass stars, and for his discovery of more than fifty planets orbiting other stars
2004	Lyman Page	For his decade-long series of state-of-the-art experiments aimed at the discovery and characterization of degree-scale temperature anisotropies of the cosmic microwave background radiation
2005	Brian P. Schmidt	For using observations of Type Ia supernovae to discover that the Universe's expansion is accelerating
2007	Andrea Ghez	For her use of speckle and AO and IR imaging to further our understanding of the dark object in the Galactic Center (the supermassive black hole) and for her work on star formation and evolution of pre-main-sequence objects
2008	Mike Brown	For his outstanding research and lasting contribution to astronomy through the characterization of the outer solar system and the discovery of objects comparable to Pluto
2010	J. Davy Kirkpatrick	For his outstanding research and lasting contribution to astronomy through the discovery and characterization of the lowest mass stars and brown dwarfs
2012	Pieter van Dokkum	For his studies of the evolution of the most massive galaxies over cosmic time
2014	Alice Shapley	For her contributions to the study of how galaxies form in the early universe
2015	Vasily Belokurov	For his discoveries of structures in the Milky Way through data-mining of large surveys
2019	Jenny Green	For her work on black holes

== See also ==
- List of astronomy awards
