= Lyman Page =

American astrophysicist

Lyman A. Page Jr.
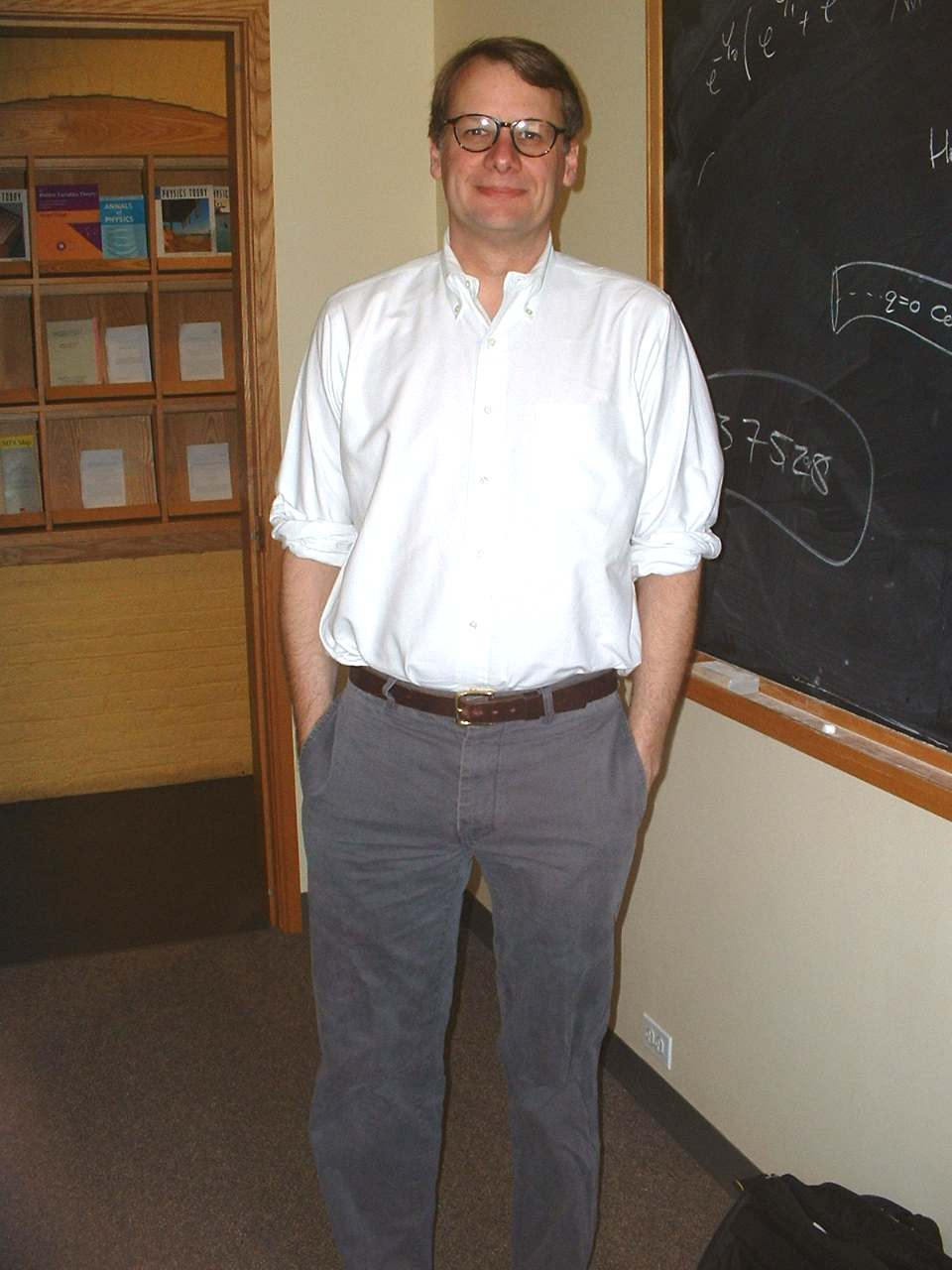
- Lyman in 2005
- Born: Lyman Alexander Page, Jr. September 24, 1957 (age 68)
- Education: Bowdoin College (BA); Massachusetts Institute of Technology (PhD)
- Known for: Co-leading the Wilkinson Microwave Anisotropy Probe project
- Spouse: Elizabeth Olson
- Children: 3
- Awards: Marc Aaronson Memorial Lectureship; Shaw Prize in Astronomy; Gruber Prize in Cosmology; Breakthrough Prize in Fundamental Physics
- Scientific career
- Fields: Astrophysics
- Workplaces: Princeton University; Massachusetts Institute of Technology; Bartol Research Foundation
- Thesis: A measurement of the cosmic microwave background radiation anisotropy (1989)
- Doctoral advisor: Stephan S. Meyer

Lyman Alexander Page, Jr. (born September 24, 1957) is the James S. McDonnell Distinguished University Professor of Physics at Princeton University. He is an expert in observational cosmology and one of the original co-investigators for the Wilkinson Microwave Anisotropy Probe (WMAP) project that made precise observations of the electromagnetic radiation from the Big Bang, known as cosmic microwave background radiation.

== Early life and education ==
Page was born in San Francisco in 1957, and moved through Virginia and New Hampshire with his parents, eventually settling in Maine. His father was a pediatrician and his mother an artist. He has a younger brother and sister. He became interested in physics at Bowdoin College, Brunswick, Maine, where he did his undergraduate studies, after a course taught by Elroy O. LaCasce. He worked on the Mach’s principle for a course project and was drawn to cosmology. Page graduated with a BA in Physics in 1978.

Page then became a research technician for 15 months at the Bartol Research Foundation (now Bartol Research Institute), being stationed at the McMurdo Station in the Antarctica and operating a cosmic ray station. Returning to the United States, he bought and rebuilt a sailboat, and started sailing around the East Coast and the Caribbean for 2.5 years. He intermittently worked onshore in carpentry, rigging and other kinds of boat service, until he survived a storm near Venezuela, after which he decided to pursue graduate studies. Rainer Weiss from the Department of Physics of the Massachusetts Institute of Technology (MIT) agreed to let Page work in his lab, albeit without pay, so Page worked as carpenter in the day and at Weiss's lab at night. Eventually in 1983, Page began his PhD study at the MIT under the supervision of Stephan S. Meyer, completing 6 years later.

== Scientific career ==
After his PhD, Page stayed at MIT as a postdoctoral researcher, and joined the Department of Physics of Princeton University in 1990, first as an instructor, and then promoted to assistant professor 1 year later and associate professor in 1995. He became a full professor in 1998. Since 2005, he has been successively appointed to different endowed professorships, including the Henry DeWolf Smyth Professor of Physics (2005-2014), the Cyrus Fogg Brackett Chair of Physics (2014-2015) and the James S. McDonnell Distinguished University Professor of Physics (since 2015).

Between 2011 and 2017, Page was the chair, or Head, of the Department of Physics of Princeton University.

Page was the founding director of the Atacama Cosmology Telescope project from 2004 to 2014. Currently, he is a member of the executive board of the Simons Observatory, an Advisor for Gravity and the Extreme Universe at the Canadian Institute for Advanced Research, and serves on the board of directors of the Research Corporation for Science Advancement.

== Research ==
Page's research centers around the Cosmic microwave background (CMB), which is the electromagnetic radiation from the Big Bang. In 1991, Page, together with David Todd Wilkinson, Norman Jarosik and Edward J. Wollack, conceived of a satellite designed to specifically detect CMB. They eventually partnered with Johns Hopkins University, University of California, Los Angeles, the NASA Goddard Space Flight Center and other institutions, and the effort became the Wilkinson Microwave Anisotropy Probe (WMAP) project, which was named in honor of Wilkinson. The satellite was launched in 2001. Since CMB comes from a time when the universe began, WMAP enables the study of the universe's early history, including its expansion, as well as its composition.

== Personal life ==
Page met his wife, Elizabeth Olson, during his PhD years at the Massachusetts Institute of Technology. Olson is a biophysics professor at Columbia University. They have three boys.

== Awards ==
- Marc Aaronson Memorial Lectureship (2004)
- Member of the American Academy of Arts and Sciences (2004)
- Member of the National Academy of Sciences (2006)
- Shaw Prize in Astronomy (2010)
- Fellow of the American Physical Society (2013)
- Gruber Prize in Cosmology (2015)
- Breakthrough Prize in Fundamental Physics (2018) (with Charles L. Bennett, Gary Hinshaw, Norman Jarosik, David Spergel and the WMAP Science Team)
- Marcel Grossman Award, International Center for Relativistic Astrophysics (2018)
