= Strong gravitational lensing =

Gravitational deflection of light

Strong gravitational lensing is a gravitational lensing effect that is strong enough to produce multiple images, arcs, or Einstein rings. Generally, for strong lensing to occur, the projected lens mass density must be greater than the critical density, that is $\Sigma_{cr}$. For point-like background sources, there will be multiple images; for extended background emissions, there can be arcs or rings. Topologically, multiple image production is governed by the odd number theorem.

== Discovery ==
Albert Einstein published the first theory of strong gravitational lensing, "Lens-Like Action of a Star by the Deviation of Light in the Gravitational Field", in 1936. It was later found that he had derived the basics of this theory as early as 1912, before he had finished his theory of general relativity. At the time he published his 1936 paper, Einstein believed it unlikely that strong gravitational lensing would be observed, even though the basic premise of light bending had already been proven in 1919 by Arthur Eddington. He only published his paper under encouragement from Rudi W. Mandl.

Strong gravitational lensing was first observed in the Twin Quasar Q0957+561 by Dennis Walsh, Bob Carswell, and Ray Weymann in 1979 when they determined that the Twin Quasar Q0957+561A comprises two images of the same object. Their findings would later be substantiated by Nathaniel Carleton, Frederick Chaffee, and Mark Davis's observations taken using the Multiple Mirror Telescope Observatory.

== Observations ==
Most strong gravitational lenses are detected by large-scale galaxy surveys.

=== Galaxy lensing ===
A light source passes behind a gravitational lens (point mass placed in the center of the image). The aqua circle is a source as it would be seen if there was no lens, white spots are the multiple images of the source.

The foreground lens is a galaxy. When the background source is a quasar or unresolved jet, the strong lensed images are usually point-like multiple images; When the background source is a galaxy or extended jet emission, the strong lensed images can be arcs or rings. As of 2017, several hundred galaxy-galaxy (g-g) strong lenses have been observed. The upcoming Vera C. Rubin Observatory and Euclid surveys are expected to discover more than 100,000 such objects.

=== Cluster lensing ===
The foreground lens is a galaxy cluster. In this case, the lens is usually powerful enough to produce noticeable both strong lensing (multiple images, arcs or rings) and weak lensing effects (ellipticity distortions). The lensing nicknamed the "Molten Ring" is an example.

== Astrophysical applications ==
=== Mass profiles ===
Because the strong lensing of a background source depends only on the gravitational potential of the foreground mass, this phenomenon can be used to constrain the mass model of lenses. With the constraints from multiple images or arcs, a proposed mass model can be optimized to fit to the observables. The subgalactic structures that currently interest lensing astronomers are the central mass distribution and dark matter halos.

=== Time delays ===
Since the light rays go through different paths to produce multiple images, they are delayed by local potentials along the light paths. The time delay differences from different images can be determined by the mass model and the cosmological model. Thus, with observed time delays and constrained mass model, cosmological constants such as the Hubble constant can be inferred.

== Gallery ==
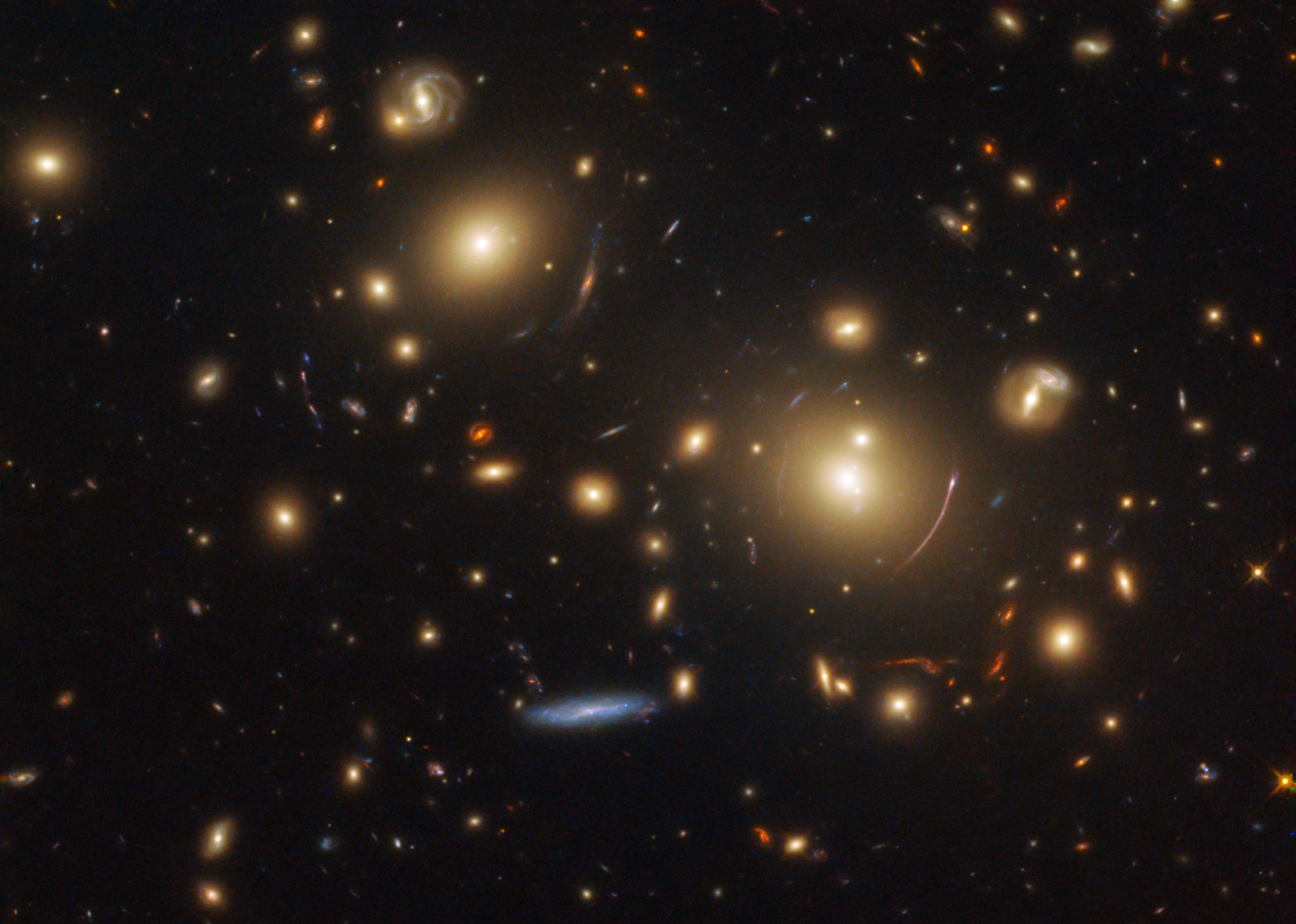
Gravitational lensing system SDSS J0928+2031.

Collection of galaxy-scale strong gravitational lenses from Euclid.

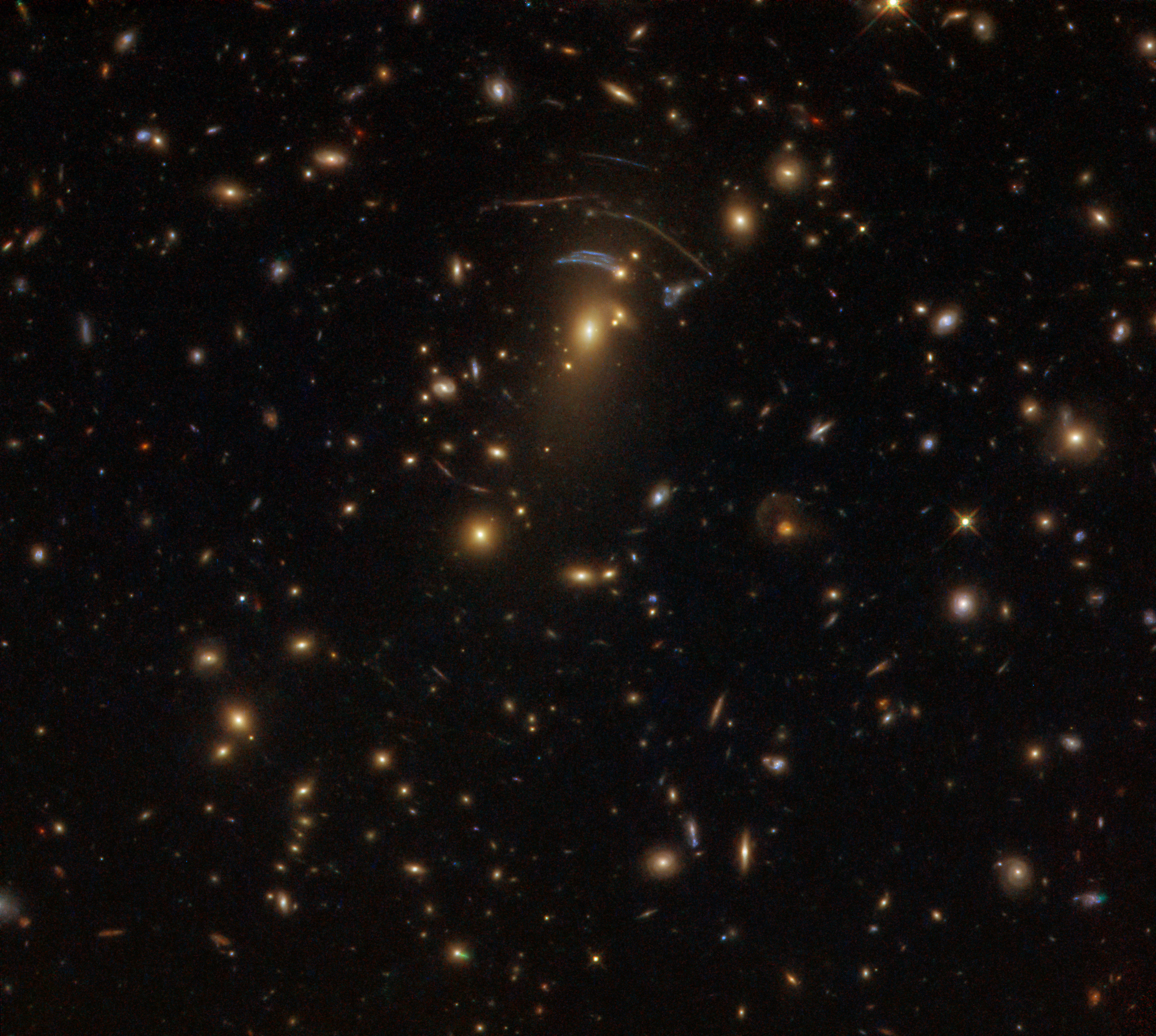
SDSS J1138+2754 taken by Hubble's WFC3 camera.

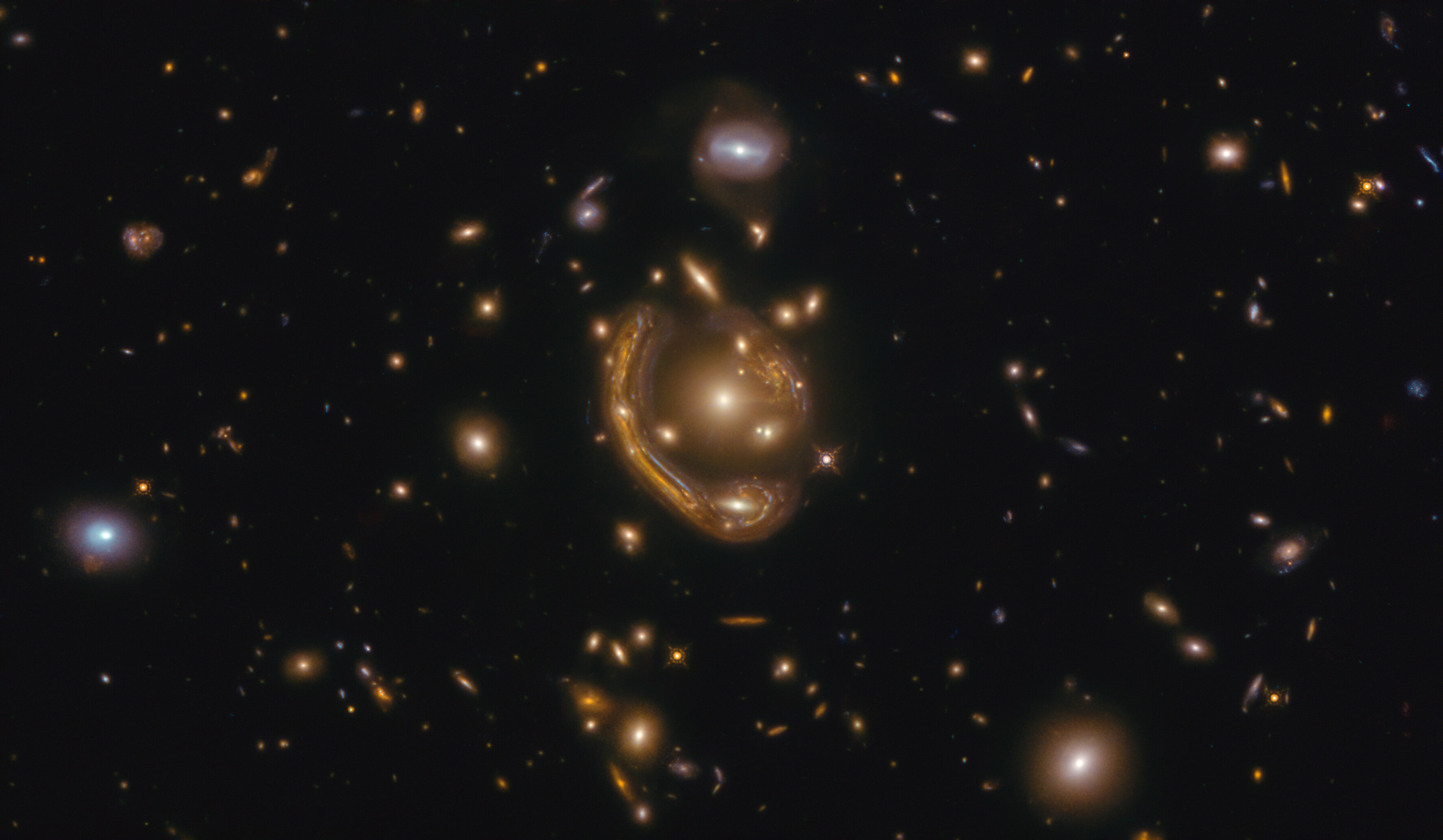
Dubbed the "Molten Ring", Hubble sees strong lensing around GAL-CLUS-022058s.
