= Odd number theorem =

The odd number theorem is a theorem in differential topology about strong gravitational lensing, which states that the number of multiple images produced by a bounded transparent lens must be odd.

== Argument ==
The gravitational lensing is a mapping from the image plane to the source plane: $M: (u,v) \mapsto (u',v')$. If we use direction cosines describing the bent light rays, we can write a vector field on $(u,v)$ plane $V:(s,w)$.

However, only in some specific directions $V_0:(s_0,w_0)$, will the bent light rays reach the observer, i.e., the images only form where $D=\delta V=0|_{(s_0,w_0)}$. Then we can directly apply the Poincaré–Hopf theorem $\chi=\sum \text{index}_D = \text{constant}$.

The index of sources and sinks is +1, and that of saddle points is −1. So the Euler characteristic equals the difference between the number of positive indices $n_{+}$ and the number of negative indices $n_{-}$. For the far field case, there is only one image, i.e., $\chi=n_{+}-n_{-}=1$. So the total number of images is $N=n_{+}+n_{-}=2n_{-}+1$, i.e., odd. The strict proof needs Uhlenbeck's Morse theory of null geodesics.
