= Charles L. Bennett =

American astronomer (born 1956)

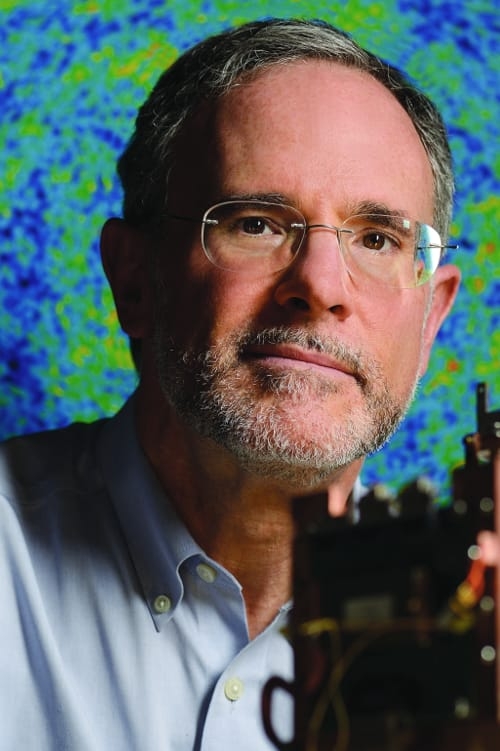
- Born: Charles Leonard Bennett; November 16, 1956; New Brunswick, New Jersey, U.S.
- Education: University of Maryland (BS, 1978); Massachusetts Institute of Technology (PhD, 1984)
- Scientific career
- Fields: Astrophysics
- Workplaces: Goddard Space Flight Center; Johns Hopkins University; National Aeronautics and Space Administration
- Doctoral advisor: Bernard F. Burke

Charles Leonard Bennett (born November 1956) is an American observational astrophysicist. He is a Bloomberg Distinguished Professor, the Alumni Centennial Professor of Physics and Astronomy and a Gilman Scholar at Johns Hopkins University. He is the Principal Investigator of NASA's Wilkinson Microwave Anisotropy Probe (WMAP).

== Education ==
Bennett received his B.S. from University of Maryland, College Park, in physics and astronomy cum laude with High Honors in astronomy, which is part of the University of Maryland College of Computer, Mathematical, and Natural Sciences.

He earned a Ph.D. in Physics from the Massachusetts Institute of Technology in 1984.

== Career ==
Bennett was at the Carnegie Institution of Washington's Department of Terrestrial Magnetism during the summers from 1976 to 1978.

Prior to 2005, Bennett was a Senior Scientist for Experimental Cosmology, Goddard Senior Fellow, and Infrared Astrophysics Branch Head at the NASA Goddard Space Flight Center.

Before leading WMAP, Bennett was the Deputy Principal Investigator for the Differential Microwave Radiometers (DMR) instrument on the Cosmic Background Explorer (COBE) mission that discovered the anisotropy of the cosmic microwave background radiation. Bennett led the effort to rebuild the radiometer front-end microwave components that succeeded in significantly enhancing the sensitivity of the DMR instrument. The Cosmic Background Explorer (COBE) Science Team also precisely measured the spectrum of the cosmic microwave background radiation.

== Honors and awards ==
Bennett is a Fellow of both the American Association for the Advancement of Science and the American Physical Society.

His National Academy of Sciences (NAS) membership citation states, "As leader of the Wilkinson Microwave Anisotropy Probe (WMAP) mission, Bennett has helped quantify, with unprecedented precision and accuracy, many key properties of the universe, including its age, the dark and baryonic matter content, the cosmological constant, and the Hubble constant." Membership is a great honor bestowed upon the most distinguished scholars in engineering and the sciences.

In 2002, the International Statistical Institute named him the most Highly Cited Researcher in space science worldwide. He is an author of the top two "Super Hot Papers in Science" published since 2003. In 2004, he was elected a Fellow of the American Academy of Arts and Sciences.

He was awarded the National Academy of Sciences Henry Draper Medal in 2005 and the Comstock Prize in Physics in 2009, both for his leadership of WMAP. Bennett received the Harvey Prize in 2006 for, "the precise determination of the age, composition and curvature of the universe." Bennett shared the 2010 Shaw Prize in astronomy with Lyman A. Page, Jr. and David N. Spergel, both of Princeton University, for their work on WMAP. The 2012 Gruber Cosmology Prize was awarded to "Charles L. Bennett and the WMAP Team" for "transforming our current paradigm of structure formation from appealing scenario into precise science." "By observing the relic radiation from the early universe, Charles L. Bennett and the WMAP team established the Standard Cosmological Model." Bennett was named the 2013 Karl G. Jansky Prize Lecturer.

In 2015 Bennett was awarded the Caterina Tomassoni and Felice Pietro Chisesi Prize "For Dr. Bennett's leadership in two experiments on the Cosmic Microwave Background that literally changed our view of the Universe: COBE-DMR, leading to the discovery of primordial spatial fluctuations in the CMB, and WMAP, leading to precise measurements of the cosmological parameters and establishing -de facto- the Standard Cosmological Model". Bennett was named for the 2017 Isaac Newton Medal and Prize: "Professor Charles L Bennett, the leader of the Wilkinson Microwave Anisotropy Probe (WMAP), has had a transformative effect in cosmology. WMAP has, through its incredibly precise measurements of temperature fluctuations in the cosmic microwave background (CMB), revolutionized our understanding of the universe. It transformed cosmology from an order-of-magnitude game to a precision experimental science." The American Academy of Arts & Sciences (AAAS) awarded its 2021 Rumford Prize to Dr. Bennett "For his contributions to the field of cosmology." AAAS President, David Oxtoby, said, “Professor Bennett’s spectacular work helped transform cosmology into an integral component in the quest for the fundamental laws of physics. His trailblazing work gives us an unprecedented, precise view of the universe, and more importantly, reminds us of the joys and possibilities of scientific discovery.”

The full list of awards includes:

- 1992 NASA Exceptional Scientific Achievement Medal (for COBE)
- 2001 Popular Science “Best of What’s New” Award in Aviation and Space for WMAP
- 2003 John C. Lindsay Memorial Award for Space Science
- 2003 NASA Outstanding Leadership Award (for WMAP)
- 2004 Elected Fellow of the American Academy of Arts and Sciences
- 2004 NASA Exceptional Scientific Achievement Award (for WMAP)
- 2005 Rotary National Award for Space Achievement (Mid-Career Stellar Award)
- 2005 Henry Draper Medal of the National Academy of Sciences
- 2005 Elected Member of the National Academy of Sciences
- 2006 Gruber Cosmology Prize (awarded to John Mather and the COBE Team for "ground-breaking studies confirming that our universe was born in a hot Big Bang.")
- 2006 The Harvey Prize of the Technion
- 2009 Comstock Prize in Physics of the National Academy of Sciences
- 2010 Shaw Prize in Astronomy
- 2012 Gruber Cosmology Prize (awarded to Charles L. Bennett and the WMAP Team "for their exquisite measurements of anisotropies in the relic radiation from the Big Bang---the Cosmic Microwave Background." "So precise are these findings that WMAP’s version of the universe is now commonly known as the Standard Cosmological Model."
- 2013 Karl G. Jansky Prize Lecturer
- 2015 Caterina Tomassoni and Felice Pietro Chisesi Prize (Tomassoni awards)
- 2017 Isaac Newton Medal and Prize: "Professor Charles L Bennett, the leader of the Wilkinson Microwave Anisotropy Probe (WMAP), has had a transformative effect in cosmology. WMAP has, through its incredibly precise measurements of temperature fluctuations in the cosmic microwave background (CMB), revolutionized our understanding of the universe. It transformed cosmology from an order-of-magnitude game to a precision experimental science."
- 2018 Breakthrough Prize in Fundamental Physics
- 2021 Rumford Prize

== Selected publications ==
Bennett has more than 91,000 citations in Google Scholar and an h-index of 80.

Highly Cited Articles (more than 2000 citations)

- 2009 with E Komatsu, J Dunkley, MR Nolta, B Gold, G Hinshaw, N Jarosik, D Larson, M Limon, L Page, DN Spergel, M Halpern, RS Hill, A Kogut, SS Meyer, GS Tucker, JL Weiland, E Wollack, EL Wright, Five-year wilkinson microwave anistropy probe* observations: cosmological interpretation, in The Astrophysical Journal Supplement Series. Vol. 180, nº 2; 330.
- 2003 with DN Spergel, L Verde, HV Peiris, E Komatsu, MR Nolta, M Halpern, G Hinshaw, N Jarosik, A Kogut, M Limon, SS Meyer, L Page, GS Tucker, JL Weiland, E Wollack, EL Wright, First-year Wilkinson Anisotropy Probe (WMAP)* observations: determination of cosmological parameters, in The Astrophysical Journal Supplement Series. Vol. 148, nº 1; 175.
- 2007 with DN Spergel, R Bean, O Doré, MR Nolta, Joanna Dunkley, G Hinshaw, N ea Jarosik, E Komatsu, L Page, HV Peiris, L Verde, M Halpern, RS Hill, A Kogut, M Limon, SS Meyer, N Odegard, GS Tucker, JL Weiland, E Wollack, EL Wright, Three-year Wilkinson Microwave Anisotropy Probe (WMAP) observations: implications for cosmology, in The Astrophysical Journal Supplement Series. Vol. 170, nº 2; 377.
- 2003 with M Bay, M Halpern, G Hinshaw, C Jackson, N Jarosik, A Kogut, M Limon, SS Meyer, L Page, DN Spergel, GS Tucker, DT Wilkinson, E Wollack, EL Wright, The Microwave Anisotropy Probe* Mission, in The Astrophysical Journal. Vol. 583, nº 1; 1.
- 2013 with G Hinshaw, D Larson, E Komatsu, DN Spergel, Joanna Dunkley, MR Nolta, M Halpern, RS Hill, N Odegard, L Page, KM Smith, JL Weiland, B Gold, N Jarosik, A Kogut, M Limon, SS Meyer, GS Tucker, E Wollack, EL Wright, Nine-year Microwave Anisotropy Probe (WMAP) observaitons: cosmological parameter results, in The Astrophysical Journal Supplement Series. Vol. 208, nº 2; 19.
- 1992 with GF Smoot, A Kogut, EL Wright, J Aymon, NW Boggess, ES Cheng, G De Amici, S Gulkis, MG Hauser, G Hinshaw, PD Jackson, M Janssen, E Kaita, T Kelsall, P Keegstra, C Lineweaver, K Loewenstein, P Lubin, J Mather, SS Meyer, SH Moseley, T Murdock, L Rokke, RF Silverberg, L Tenorio, R Weiss, DT Wilkinson, Structure in the COBE differential microwave radiometer first-year maps, in The Astrophysical Journal. Vol. 396; L1-L5.
- 2013 with D Larson, JL Weiland, N Jarosik, G Hinshaw, N Odegard, KM Smith, RS Hill, B Gold, M Halpern, E Komatsu, MR Nolta, L Page, David N Spergel, E Wollack, J Dunkley, A Kogut, M Limon, SS Meyer, GS Tucker, EL Wright, Nine-year Wilkinson Microwave Anisotropy Probe (WMAP) observations: final maps and results, in The Astrophysical Journal Supplement Series. Vol. 208, nº 2; 20.
- 2009 with G Hinshaw, JL Weiland, RS Hill, N Odegard, D Larson, J Dunkley, B Gold, MR Greason, N Jarosik, Eiichiro Komatsu, MR Nolta, L Page, DN Spergel, E Wollack, M Halpern, A Kogut, M Limon, SS Meyer, GS Tucker, EL Wrigh, Five-year wilkinson microwave anisotropy probe* observations: data processing, sky maps, and basic results, in The Astrophysical Journal Supplement Series. Vol. 180, nº 2; 225.

== Bibliography ==
- Wilkinson Microwave Anisotrophy Probe Charles L. Bennett Scholarpedia, 2(10):4731. doi:10.4249/scholarpedia.4731
