= Walter Lewin =

Dutch astrophysicist (born 1936)

Walter H.G. Lewin
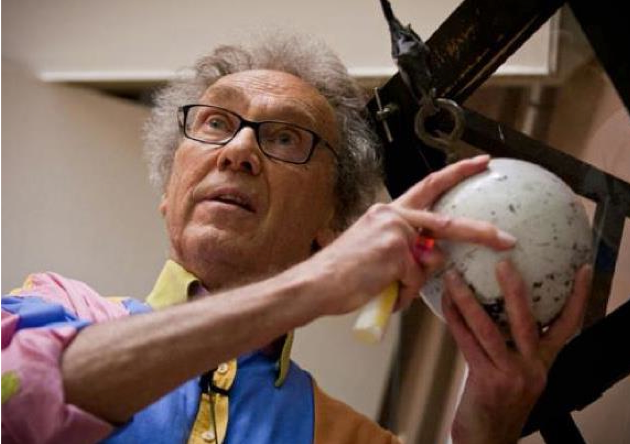
- Lewin at his lecture, "For the Love of Physics", at MIT on May 16, 2011
- Born: January 29, 1936 (age 90); The Hague, Netherlands
- Education: Delft University of Technology
- Children: Emmanuel Gustav Walter Lewin and Emma Lewin
- Awards: NASA Award for Exceptional Scientific Achievement (1978); Alexander von Humboldt Award (1984 and 1991); Guggenheim Fellowship (1984); MIT Science Council Prize for Excellence in Undergraduate Teaching (1984); W. Buechner Teaching Prize (1988); Everett Moore Baker Memorial Award for Excellence in Undergraduate Teaching (2003)
- Scientific career
- Fields: Astrophysics, Physics
- Workplaces: MIT

Walter Hendrik Gustav Lewin (born January 29, 1936) is a Dutch astrophysicist and retired professor of physics at the Massachusetts Institute of Technology. Lewin earned his doctorate in nuclear physics in 1965 at the Delft University of Technology and was a member of MIT's physics faculty for 43 years beginning in 1966 until his retirement in 2009.

Lewin's contributions in astrophysics include the first discovery of a rotating neutron star through all-sky balloon surveys and research in X-ray detection in investigations through satellites and observatories. Lewin has received awards for teaching and is known for his lectures on physics and their publication online via YouTube, MIT OpenCourseWare and edX.

In December 2014, MIT revoked Lewin's Professor Emeritus title after an MIT investigation determined that Lewin had violated university policy by sexually harassing an online student in a MITx course he had taught.

== Early life and education ==
Lewin was born to Walter Simon Lewin and Pieternella Johanna van der Tang in 1936 in The Hague, Netherlands. He was a child when Nazi Germany occupied The Netherlands during World War II. His paternal grandparents Gustav and Emma Lewin, who were Jewish, were gassed in Auschwitz on November 19, 1942. To protect the family, Lewin's father — who was Jewish, unlike his mother — decided one day to simply leave without telling anyone. His mother was left to raise the children and run a small school she and her husband had started together. After the war ended, his father resurfaced; Lewin describes having a "more or less normal childhood." His parents continued running the school, which he says strongly influenced his love of teaching.

== Academic career ==
Walter Lewin taught high school physics while studying for his PhD, then he went to Massachusetts Institute of Technology in January 1966 as a post-doctoral associate, and was appointed an assistant professor. He was promoted to associate professor of physics in 1968 and to full professor in 1974.

At MIT, Lewin joined the X-ray astronomy group and conducted all-sky balloon surveys with George W. Clark. Through the late seventies, there were about twenty successful balloon flights. These balloon surveys led to the discovery of five new X-ray sources, whose spectra were very different from the X-ray sources discovered during rocket observations. The X-ray flux of these sources was variable. Among them was GX 1+4 whose X-ray flux appeared to be periodic with a period of about 2.4 minutes. This was the first discovery of a slowly rotating neutron star.

In October 1967 when Scorpius X-1 was observed, an X-ray flare was detected. The flux went up by a factor of about 4 in ten minutes after which it declined again. This was the first detection of X-ray variability observed during the observations. The rockets used by other researchers could not have discovered that the X-ray sources varied on such short time scales because they were only up for several minutes, whereas the balloons could be in the air for many hours.

Lewin was co-investigator on the Small Astronomy Satellite 3 (SAS-3) project. He directed the burst observations and discovered several X-ray bursters, among them was the rapid burster which can produce thousands of X-ray bursts in one day. His group also discovered that the rapid burster produces two types of bursts and established a classification of bursts as type I (thermonuclear flashes) and type II (accretion flow instabilities).

Lewin was co-principal investigator on High Energy Astronomy Observatory 1 HEAO-1 (A4), which has yielded the first all sky catalog at high-energy X rays. With H. Pedersen and J. van Paradijs, Lewin made extensive studies of optical bursts which are associated with X-ray bursts; for X-ray detections they used SAS-3 and the Japanese observatory "Hakucho". Their combined burst observations demonstrated that the optical bursts are a few seconds delayed relative to the X-ray bursts. This established the size of the accretion disc surrounding the accreting neutron stars.

In his search for millisecond X-ray pulsations from low-mass X-ray binaries, in 1984–85 Lewin made guest observations with the European observatory EXOSAT in collaboration with colleagues from Amsterdam and Garching, Germany. This led to the unexpected discovery of intensity-dependent quasi-periodic oscillations (QPO) in the X-ray flux of GX 5-1. During 1989 to 1992, using the Japanese observatory "Ginga", Lewin and his co-workers studied the relation between the X-ray spectral state and the radio brightness of several bright low-mass X-ray binaries.

Lewin was closely involved in ROSAT observations of the nearby galaxies M31 and Messier 81. Lewin and his graduate student Eugene Magnier have made deep optical charge-coupled device observations of M31 in four colors; they have published a catalogue of 500,000 objects. Lewin and his graduate student David Pooley initiated the successful X-ray observations within six days of the appearance of supernova SN 1993J in M81.

Lewin collaborated with his close friend Jan van Paradijs of the University of Amsterdam from 1978 until van Paradijs' death. They co-authored 150 papers.

He became a corresponding member of the Royal Netherlands Academy of Arts and Sciences in 1993 and a fellow of the American Physical Society in 1993.

Lewin and graduate student Jeffrey Kommers have worked on data from the Compton Gamma Ray Observatory (GRO). This was a collaboration with the BATSE Group in Huntsville, AL. In early December 1995, with co-workers Chryssa Kouveliotou and Van Paradijs, they discovered a new type of X-ray burst source: (GRO J1744-28) the Bursting Pulsar, and received a NASA Achievement Award for this discovery.

In 1996–1998, Lewin's collaboration with Michiel van der Klis in Amsterdam led to the discovery of kHz oscillations in many X-ray binaries.

Using the Chandra X-ray Observatory, Lewin and his graduate student David Pooley made extensive studies of supernovae and faint X-ray sources in globular clusters. This research was done in collaboration with scientists from the University of Washington, IAS in Princeton, UC Berkeley, the University of Amsterdam and Utrecht in The Netherlands, and the Naval Research Laboratory in Washington, DC. The research on supernovae produced the first X-ray spectrum with unprecedented energy resolution of SN 1989S. The research on globular clusters demonstrated that X-ray binary stars are cooked in the cores of the clusters where the stellar density is very high.

With graduate student Jon Miller, Lewin made extensive studies of black-hole X-ray binaries in the galaxy. Evidence was found for spectral distortions of the iron line (in X-rays) indicative of the influence of general relativity on the iron-line emission in the vicinity of the "event horizon" of the black holes. This research on black-hole binaries is continuing using all available observatories in orbit – among them: Chandra, the Rossi X-ray Timing Explorer (RXTE), and the European observatories XMM-Newton, Integral and NuSTAR.

Lewin has published about 450 scientific articles as of 2014.

=== Awards ===
Professor Lewin's honors and awards include

- 1978 – NASA Award for Exceptional Scientific Achievement
- 1984 – Alexander von Humboldt Award
- 1984 – Guggenheim Fellowship
- 1984 – MIT Science Council Prize for Excellence in Undergraduate Teaching
- 1988 – MIT Department of Physics W. Buechner Teaching Prize
- 1991 – Alexander von Humboldt Award (again)
- 1997 – NASA Group Achievement Award for the Discovery of the Bursting Pulsar
- 2003 – MIT Everett Moore Baker Memorial Award for Excellence in Undergraduate Teaching
- 2011 – first recipient of the Educator Award for OpenCourseWare Excellence (ACE)

On April 3, 2012, Lewin was ranked by the Princeton Review among "The Best 300". He was the only MIT faculty member (albeit, retired) to make it to that list.

=== Lectures ===
For about 15 years (starting in 1982) Lewin presented a one-hour program weekly on MIT Cable TV. The shows were aired 24 hours per day helping freshmen with their weekly homework assignments. Videos of Lewin's lectures on Newtonian mechanics (1999), electricity and magnetism (2002) and the physics of vibrations and waves (2004), among others, could be viewed on the MIT OpenCourseWare web site until MIT removed them after finding that Lewin had sexually harassed a student in the online course.

Since February 2015, Lewin has been running and managing his own YouTube channel called "Lectures by Walter Lewin. They will make you ♥ Physics". Several of his lectures have been viewed more than a million times. His 2011 farewell lecture "For the Love of Physics" has been viewed around 15 million times - 1 million times on MIT's OCW, 6.9 million times on the channel "For the Allure of Physics" and 6.9 million times on his personal channel. In 2007, a picture of Lewin swinging on a pendulum during a lecture at MIT, was shown on the front page of the New York Times "At 71, Professor is a Pendulum and a Web Star".

== Sexual harassment ==
In early December 2014, MIT determined that Lewin had sexually harassed an online MITx learner, in violation of MIT's policies. Inside Higher Ed reported that this learner was one of at least 10 female students to whom Lewin had sent inappropriate messages, which MIT confirmed. The woman came forward to ensure that the case was not forgotten, stating that Lewin pushed her to participate in sexual role-playing and asked for sexually explicit photos. As a consequence of its internal investigation, MIT revoked Lewin's professor emeritus title, and removed his lectures from the institute's online learning platforms.

== Personal life ==
Lewin is an art enthusiast and collector. He has lectured on the subject at MIT. In the 1970s and 1980s, he collaborated with the artist Otto Piene, who was one of the founders of the ZERO movement and the director of MIT's Center for Advanced Visual Studies, and Peter Struycken, who is a computer artist.

== Media appearances ==
=== TV performances ===
Below are a selection of notable TV appearances:

- 1998, A Science Odyssey, WGBH, Boston, Produced by PBS
- 2003, "The Elegant Universe", NOVA, Produced by PBS
- 2005, "Einstein's Unfinished Symphony", BBC Horizon
- 2008, Riz Khan – Walter Lewin & physics
- 2011, The Fabric of the Cosmos, NOVA, Produced by PBS
- 2011, The Martha Stewart Show, season 3 episode 3172
- 2011, De Wereld Draait Door, VARA, the Netherlands, Oct 24
- 2012, De Wereld Draait Door, VARA, the Netherlands, May 9
- 2012, De Wereld Draait Door, VARA, the Netherlands, May 9 part II
- 2012, De Wereld Draait Door, VARA, the Netherlands, November 27
- 2013, January–February, 8 one-hour lectures, TV NHK, Japan.
- 2014, September, French TV Canal+ series of documentary – "Special Investigations", on Online Education
- 2014, The brilliant professor Walter Lewin 'I'm an artist' (Dutch TV NCRV)
- 2014, The World of Quantum, NOVA, Produced by PBS

== Publications ==
=== Books ===
- Lewin, Walter; Goldstein, Warren (2011). For the Love of Physics: From the End of the Rainbow to the Edge of Time – A Journey Through the Wonders of Physics. Simon and Schuster. ISBN 978-1-4391-0827-7. (available in English, German, Dutch, Spanish, Korean, Japanese, Chinese, Russian, Polish, Greek, Italian, Persian and Turkish)
- Lewin, Walter; van der Klis, Michiel, eds. (2006). Compact stellar X-ray sources. Cambridge University Press. ISBN 978-0-521-82659-4.
- Lewin, Walter H.G.; van Paradijs, Jan; van den Heuvel, Edward P.J., eds. (1995). X-ray binaries. Cambridge University Press. ISBN 978-0-521-41684-9.
- Truemper, J.; Lewin, W.H.G.; Brinkmann, W., eds. (1986). The evolution of galactic X-ray binaries. D. Reidel Pub. Co.; Sold and distributed in the U.S.A. and Canada by Kluwer Academic Publishers. ISBN 978-90-277-2184-6.
- Lewin, Walter H.G.; van den Heuvel, Edward, eds. (1983). Accretion-driven stellar X-ray sources. Cambridge University Press. ISBN 0-521-24521-4.

=== Selected publications ===
Lewin has published about 450 scientific articles, below are a selected few.

- Lewin, Walter H.G.; Jan van Paradijs; Ronald E. Taam (2004). "X-ray Bursts". Space Science Reviews. 62 (3–4): 223–389. Bibcode:1993SSRv...62..223L. doi:10.1007/BF00196124. S2CID 125504322.
- D. Pooley; W.H.G. Lewin; S.F. Anderson; H. Baumgardt; A.V. Filippenko; B.M. Gaensler; et al. (2003). "Dynamical Formation of Close Binary Systems in Globular Clusters". Astrophysical Journal. 591 (2): L131–L134. arXiv:astro-ph/0305003. Bibcode:2003ApJ...591L.131P. doi:10.1086/377074. S2CID 36027886.
- J. Miller; A. Fabian; R. Wijnands; R. Remillard; P. Wojdowski; N. Schulz; et al. (2002). "Resolving the Composite Fe K-alpha Emission Line in the Galactic Black Hole Cygnus X-1 with Chandra". Astrophysical Journal. 578 (1): 348–356. arXiv:astro-ph/0202083. Bibcode:2002ApJ...578..348M. doi:10.1086/342466. S2CID 119393282.
- D. Pooley; W. Lewin; L. Homer; S. Anderson; B. Gaensler; B. Margon; et al. (2002). "Optical Identifications of Multiple Faint X-ray Sources in the Globular Cluster NGC~6752: Evidence for Numerous Cataclysmic Variables". Astrophysical Journal. 569 (1): 405. arXiv:astro-ph/0110192. Bibcode:2002ApJ...569..405P. doi:10.1086/339210. S2CID 12626024.
- C. Kouveliotou; J. van Paradijs; G. J. Fishman; M. S. Briggs; J. Kommers; B. A. Harmon; et al. (1996). "Discovery of a New Type of Burster from the Galactic Center Region". Nature. 379 (6568): 799. Bibcode:1996Natur.379..799K. doi:10.1038/379799a0. hdl:2060/19970023049. S2CID 4323079.
- M. v.d. Klis; J. Swank; W. Zhang; K. Jahoda; E. Morgan; W. Lewin; et al. (1996). "Discovery of Sub millisecond Quasi-periodic Oscillations in the X-ray Flux of Scorpius X-1". Astrophysical Journal. 469: L1–L4. arXiv:astro-ph/9607047. Bibcode:1996ApJ...469L...1V. doi:10.1086/310251. S2CID 16903844.
- W.H.G. Lewin; G.W. Clark & W.B. Smith (1968). "Observation of an X-Ray Flare from Sco X-1". Astrophysical Journal Letters. 152: L55. Bibcode:1968ApJ...152L..55L. doi:10.1086/180177.
