= Ed van den Heuvel =

Dutch astronomer (born 1940)

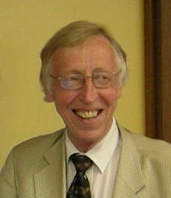
- Van den Heuvel in 2007
- Born: 2 November 1940 (age 86); Soest, Netherlands
- Education: Utrecht University
- Known for: Compact objects, gamma ray bursts
- Awards: Spinoza Prize (1995), Descartes Prize (2002), Viktor Ambartsumian International Science Prize (2018)
- Scientific career
- Fields: Astronomy
- Workplaces: University of Amsterdam
- Doctoral advisor: Kees de Jager; Anne Barbara Underhill
- Doctoral students: Michiel van der Klis
- Website: www.astro.uva.nl/people/ed-van-den-heuvel

Edward Peter Jacobus "Ed" van den Heuvel (born 2 November 1940) is a Dutch astronomer and emeritus professor at the Astronomical Institute Anton Pannekoek of the University of Amsterdam.

Van den Heuvel is well known for his work on the formation and evolution of compact astrophysical objects such as neutron stars, black holes, and white dwarfs in binary systems, and for his investigation of gamma ray bursts.

== Education ==
Van den Heuvel studied mathematics, physics, and astronomy at Utrecht University, where he earned a Bachelor’s degree in 1959 and a Master’s degree (Cum Laude) in 1963. He remained at Utrecht for his graduate studies, completing a PhD in Mathematical and Physical Sciences in March 1968 under the supervision of Kees de Jager and Anne Barbara Underhill.

== Career ==
van den Heuvel began his academic career with assistant positions in astrophysics at the Free University of Brussels and Utrecht University from 1962 to 1968. He then undertook a postdoctoral fellowship at Lick Observatory, University of California, Santa Cruz from 1968 to 1969, before returning to the Netherlands to serve as a lecturer and later university docent in astrophysics at Utrecht University from 1969 to 1974. Concurrently, he held a part-time professorship in astrophysics at the Free University of Brussels from 1970 to 1980.

In 1974, van den Heuvel was a visiting member at the Institute for Advanced Study in Princeton, and later that year he was appointed Full Professor of Astrophysics at the University of Amsterdam, a position he held until his retirement in November 2005. Following retirement, he became Professor Emeritus at the University of Amsterdam and Vrije Universiteit Brussel.

Throughout his career, van den Heuvel combined academic research with administrative leadership. He served as Chair of the Astronomy Department at the University of Amsterdam from 1974 to 2005 and as Dean of the Faculty of Physics and Astronomy from 1987 to 1990.

He was the founding Chair of the Netherlands Research School for Astronomy (NOVA, from 1992 to 2004, bringing together all Dutch university astronomy departments into a unified graduate research network.

He also chaired the Space Research Organization of the Netherlands from 1984 to 1996 and the Netherlands Foundation for Radio Astronomy (ASTRON, 1996–2005), securing funding for major projects including the LOFAR radio telescope.

Van den Heuvel contributed internationally as Chair of the Time Allocation Committee for ESA’s INTEGRAL gamma-ray satellite (2002–2017) and as a founding Chair of the Spinoza Club, a society of Spinoza Prize laureates.

== Research and scientific contributions ==
Van den Heuvel is widely recognised for his fundamental contributions to the theory of binary star evolution, particularly the evolutionary pathways leading to compact binary systems such as X ray binaries and binary radio pulsars.

=== Binary evolution and compact objects ===
In a seminal 1972 paper (with J. Heise), van den Heuvel demonstrated that massive close binaries can survive their first supernova explosion and evolve into high mass X ray binaries (HMXBs). This work, independently paralleled by Tutukov and Yungelson (1973), established what became the “standard model” for HMXB formation. Subsequent research showed that later in their evolution, HMXBs inevitably spiral inwards to very close orbital periods, explaining the formation of double neutron star systems, now observed as binary radio pulsars.

Van den Heuvel’s work provided the first evolutionary connection between X ray binaries and binary radio pulsars, elucidating a key channel for the formation of close double neutron stars.

He introduced van den Heuvel diagrams, schematic representations of evolutionary pathways for binary systems, which remain widely used in the field.

=== Super Soft X ray Sources and other systems ===
In 1991, he identified that the class of Super Soft X ray Sources discovered by the ROSAT satellite are accreting white dwarfs powered by nuclear burning on their surfaces. His research has influenced understanding of mass transfer processes, magnetic field evolution in accreting neutron stars and the detailed classification of binary compact objects.

=== Work on X ray binaries, pulsars, and gravitational waves ===
Van den Heuvel has also contributed to understanding the evolution of millisecond pulsars, the role of magnetic field decay in accreting neutron stars, and the physical processes leading to the formation of diverse populations of compact systems. In 2017, he proposed an additional formation channel for close double black holes involving evolutionary interactions not previously considered, contributing to theoretical frameworks relevant to gravitational wave astronomy.

== Awards ==
- Minor Planet (Asteroid) Nr. 3091, named "van den Heuvel" (1986).
- Physica Prize, Netherlands Physical Society (1987).
- Doctor Honoris Causa, Catholic University Leuven (1994).
- Spinoza Prize, Netherlands Organisation for Scientific Research (1995).
- Knight in the Order of the Netherlands Lion (1999).
- Honorary Fellow, Indian Academy of Sciences (2000).
- Descartes Prize, European Commission (2002) for leading the Gamma Ray Burst Afterglow Collaboration Europe (GRACE).
- Honorary Fellow, Royal Astronomical Society, London (2005).
- Gold Medal of the Natuur en Geneeskundig Congres, Amsterdam Scientific Society (c. 2005).
- Bishop Lecture, Columbia University, New York (2006).
- Honorary Fellow, Inter University Centre for Astronomy & Astrophysics, Pune (2009).
- Viktor Ambartsumian International Science Prize (2018).
- Oeuvre Prize Astronomy of the Royal Holland Society of Science (2023).
