= Giuseppe Cesare Perola =

Italian astrophysicist (1940–2021)

- Born: 1940
- Died: 17 July 2021 (aged 80–81); Ariccia
- Known for: Black holes; Active Galactic Nuclei
- Awards: 1998 Bruno Rossi Prize
- Scientific career
- Fields: astrophysics
- Institutions: Università degli Studi di Milano; Sapienza University of Rome; Università degli Studi Roma Tre
- Academic advisors: Giuseppe Occhialini Connie Dilworth

Giuseppe Cesare Perola (1940–2021) was an Italian astrophysicist who has made significant contributions to the study of extragalactic radio astronomy, radiogalaxies, active galactic nuclei, and the growth of supermassive black holes. He began his scientific career at the University of Milan in 1965, working in the group led by Giuseppe Occhialini and Connie Dilworth.

In 1968, Perola received a fellowship from the European Space Research Organization (ESRO) and spent two years at the Leiden Observatory in the Netherlands to study and work on extragalactic radio astronomy. He then returned to the University of Milan, where he served as an associate professor of physics for biology students from 1971 to 1980.

In 1980, Perola became a full professor in Astronomical and Astrophysical Disciplines, first at "Sapienza" University of Rome until 1992, and then at the newly founded Science Faculty and Physics Department of "Roma Tre" University until his early retirement in 2007.

Perola's main fields of interest include the origin of cosmic rays, radiogalaxies and their interaction with the environment, especially within clusters of galaxies, physical properties of active galactic nuclei, the growth of supermassive black holes, and science with space missions, particularly in the X-ray band. He led the group that identified and internationally publicized the scientific goals of the Italian-Dutch BeppoSAX mission before its launch.

In recognition of his contributions to astrophysics, Perola received the American Astronomical Society High Energy Astrophysics Division (AAS HEAD) 1998 Bruno Rossi Prize, which he shared with the BeppoSAX team and Jan van Paradijs "for the discovery of the X-ray and optical afterglow of gamma-ray bursts, making possible the solution to the 30 year old problem of fixing the distances to the gamma-ray burst sources".
