= Anna Watts =

Dutch physicist

- Born: Anna Louise Watts
- Education: Bradford Girls' Grammar School
- Alma mater: University of Oxford (BA); University of Southampton (PhD)
- Scientific career
- Fields: Astronomy; Neutron stars Physics
- Institutions: University of Amsterdam; Goddard Space Flight Center; Max Planck Institute for Astrophysics; Ministry of Defence
- Thesis: The dynamics of differentially rotating neutron stars (2003)
- Doctoral advisor: Nils Andersson
- Website: staff.fnwi.uva.nl/a.l.watts/

Anna Louise Watts is a Professor of Astrophysics at the University of Amsterdam. She studies neutron stars and their thermonuclear explosions.

== Education ==
Watts was educated at Bradford Girls' Grammar School. She studied physics at Merton College, Oxford, and graduated with a first class degree from the University of Oxford in 1995. She entered the science stream at the Ministry of Defence on a graduate scheme, where she worked for five years. Watts completed her PhD in physics supervised by Nils Andersson (physicist) in the general relativity group researching neutron stars.

== Career and research ==
After her PhD Watts moved to Washington, D.C. to work as a postdoctoral fellow at Goddard Space Flight Center. She then received a fellowship at the Max Planck Institute for Astrophysics in Munich. In 2008 Watts joined the Anton Pannekoek Institute for Astronomy.

Watts looks to understand the physics behind the violent dynamic events that occur on neutron stars. These include magnetic flares, thermonuclear explosions, and starquakes. Her research lies at the intersection of theoretical physics and astrophysics. Working with Tod Strohmayer she identified the hidden structure of a neutron star; a 1.6 km crust made of material so dense a teaspoon would weigh 10 million tonnes. In 2014 she received an ERC Starter Grant worth €1,500,000 to study the physics of neutron star explosions.

She is involved in the development future high-energy space telescopes. Watts is part of the science team for the NASA probe Strobe-X. For the Chinese-European Enhanced X-ray Timing and Polarimetry mission, she is chair of the Dense Matter Science Working Group. She is also chair of Network 3 for NOVA, the Netherlands Research School for Astronomy. She served on the European Cooperation in Science & Technology committee. Watts has contributed to Times Higher Education and Vice.
