= Chryssa Kouveliotou =

Greek astrophysicist and astronomer

- Χρύσα Κουβελιώτου
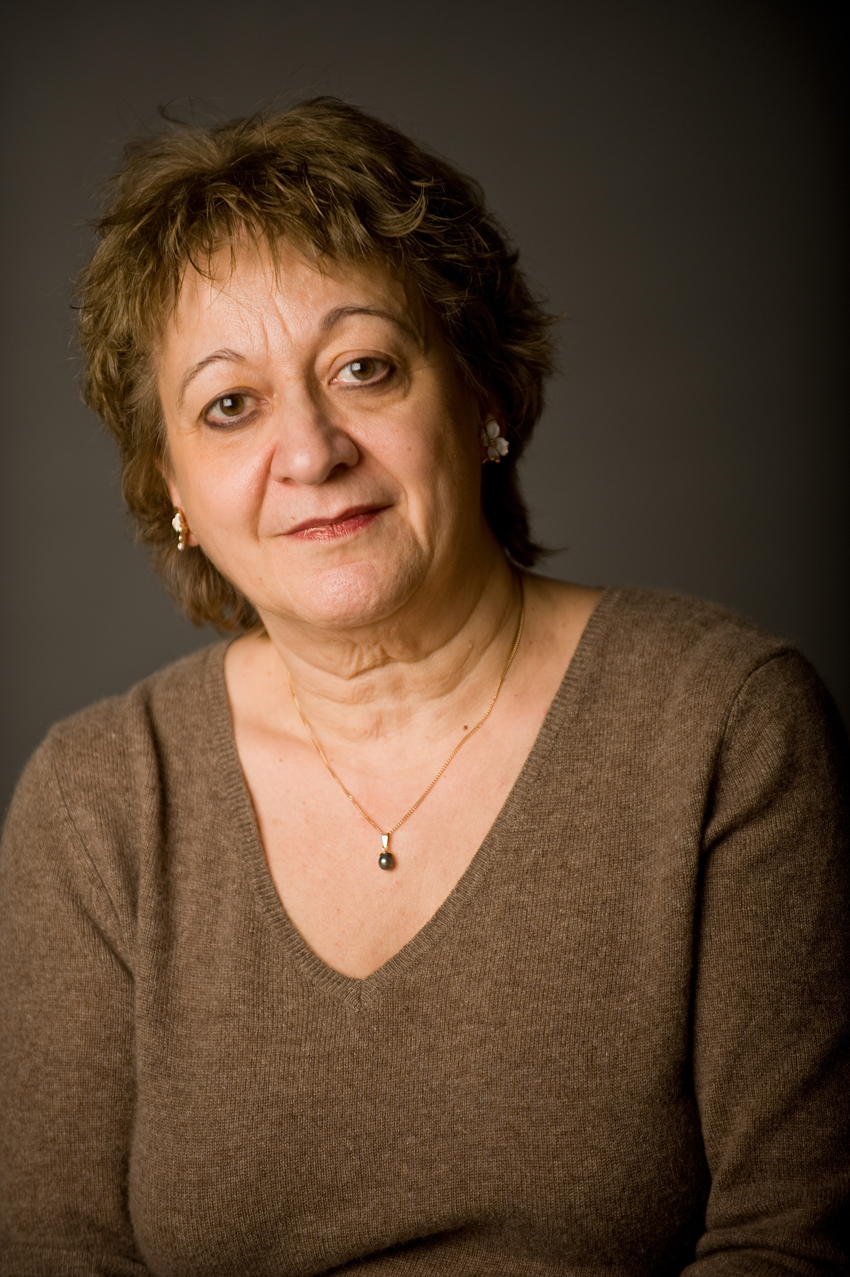
- Kouveliotou (2010)
- Born: May 26, 1953 (age 73); Athens
- Education: National & Kapodistrian University of Athens; University of Sussex; Technical University of Munich
- Occupation: Astrophysicist
- Awards: Bruno Rossi Prize 2003, Descartes Prize 2005, Dannie Heineman Prize for Astrophysics 2012, Shaw Prize 2021

Chryssa Kouveliotou (born May 26, 1953) is a Greek astrophysicist. She is a professor at George Washington University and a retired senior technologist in high-energy astrophysics at NASA's Marshall Space Flight Center in Huntsville, Alabama.

== Early life and education ==
Kouveliotou was born in Athens in May 1953. Her father was a mathematician and her mother had studied economics and worked at the Finance Ministry. She received her bachelor's degree in physics from the National & Kapodistrian University of Athens, Greece, in 1975, and earned her master's degree in science from the University of Sussex, England, in 1977. She received her doctorate in astrophysics in 1981 from the Technical University of Munich, Germany, under the supervision of Klaus Pinkau. She was a faculty at the Dept. of Physics of the National & Kapodistrian University of Athens before pursuing research work in the United States.

== Career ==
Kouveliotou joined NASA Marshall Space Flight Center in 1991, initially supporting the Gamma Ray Astrophysics Team. Her numerous contributions to the fields of astronomy and astrophysics have expanded scientific understanding of fleeting, transient phenomena in the Milky Way galaxy and throughout the universe. Besides determining the unique properties of the highly energetic emissions from gamma-ray bursts – the brightest and most powerful cosmic events ever documented – Kouveliotou was part of the team which in 1997 revealed the extragalactic nature of these sources. In 1998, she and her team also made the first confirmed detection of ultra-dense neutron stars called magnetars – the cinders of stars left over after a supernova. In 2015 she moved as a Professor of Physics at George Washington University. She was Chair of the Physics Department at GWU from 2020 to 2023 and since 2019 she is serving as Chair of the US National Committee of the IAU.

== Awards and recognition ==
Kouvelioutou has been recognised and received numerous awards for her work in high-energy astrophysics, including

- The Bruce Medal in 2024
- The Shaw Prize (jointly with Victoria M. Kaspi) in 2021
- The Dannie Heineman Prize for Astrophysics in 2012
- The NASA Exceptional Service Medal in 2012
- The Bruno Rossi Prize for her work on magnetars (jointly with Robert Duncan and Christopher Thompson) in 2003

In 2012 she was named one of Time Magazine's 25 most influential people in space. In 2005, she received the NASA Space Act Award, which recognizes and rewards outstanding scientific or technical contributions significant to NASA's mission. In 2002, she was the sole American representative on the international team which received the Descartes Prize in Astrophysics, which recognizes scientific breakthroughs from European collaborative research in any scientific field.

Kouvelioutou has been elected member of the US National Academy of Sciences (2013) and of the US Academy of Arts and Sciences (2016). She was elected a foreign member of the Royal Netherlands Academy of Arts and Sciences in 2015 as well as a foreign member of the Academy of Athens (Greece) in 2016. In 2015 she received the award of Commander of the Order of the Honor by the Greek Government, for excellence in science. She has been elected Fellow of the American Physical Society in 1993, of the American Association for the Advancement of Science in 2012, as well as Legacy Fellow of the American Astronomical Society in 2020.

Kouveliotou has served and chaired numerous advisory and evaluation committees of academic institutions. More recently, in 2022, she was elected member of the Scientific Council of the ERC.

An asteroid discovered by LONEOS at Anderson Mesa was named (28883) Kouveliotou in honor of Chryssa Kouveliotou.

== Personal life ==
Kouveliotou was married to fellow astrophysicist Jan van Paradijs.
