= Tim de Zeeuw =

Dutch astronomer

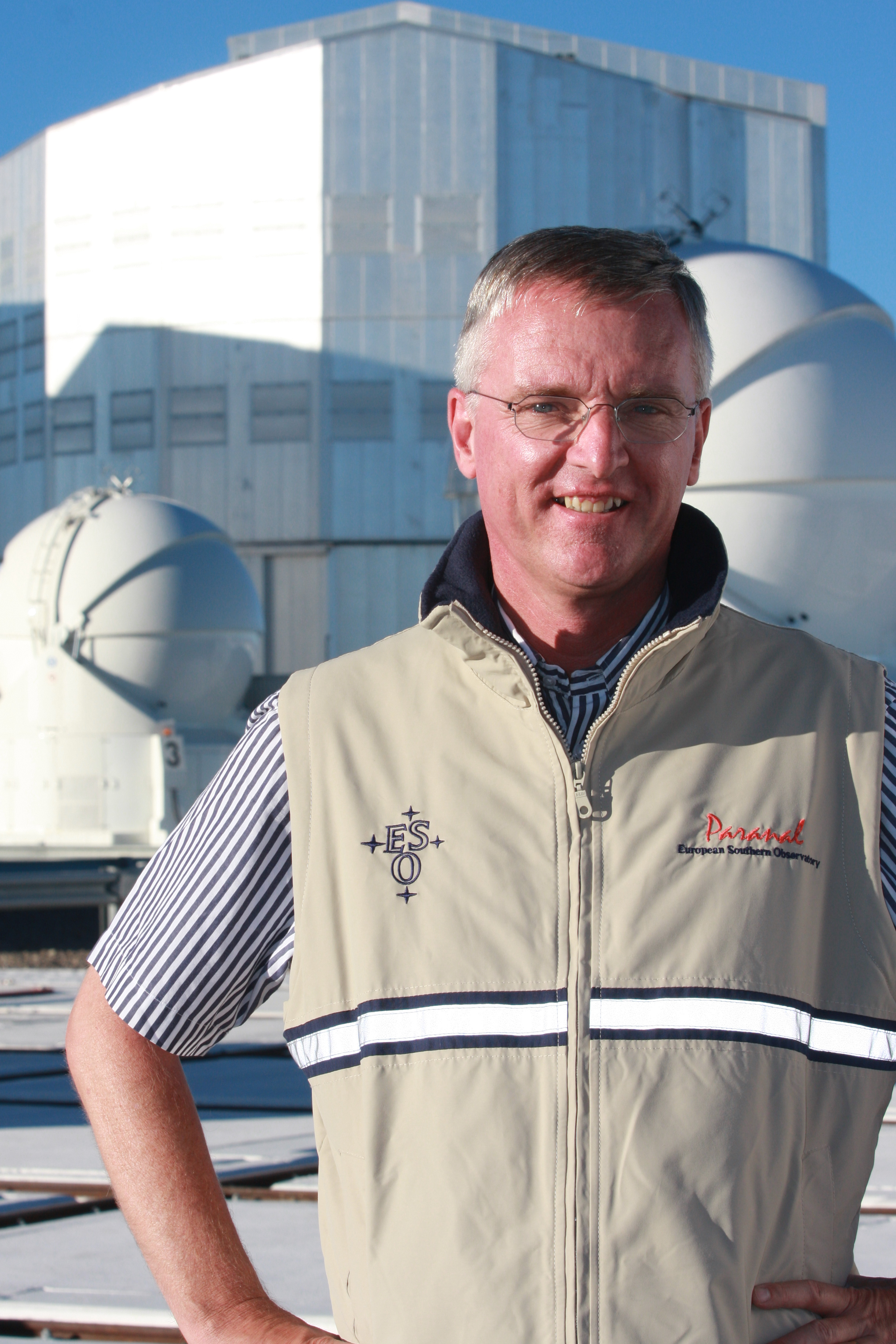
- Prof. Tim de Zeeuw visiting Paranal Observatory
- Born: Pieter Timotheus de Zeeuw; 12 May 1956 (age 70); Sleen, The Netherlands
- Education: Leiden University
- Known for: ESO General Director
- Spouse: Ewine van Dishoeck
- Awards: Descartes-Huygens Prize (2001)
- Scientific career
- Fields: Astronomy
- Workplaces: Leiden University, Max Planck Institute for Extraterrestrial Physics

Pieter Timotheus "Tim" de Zeeuw (born 12 May 1956 in Sleen) is a Dutch astronomer specializing in the formation, structure and dynamics of galaxies. From 2007 to 2017 he was the director general of European Southern Observatory. He is married to astronomer Ewine van Dishoeck. In May 2022, Leiden University suspended him after an internal review concluded that over several years he repeatedly belittled and insulted women in public and abused his position of power as a professor by threatening to damage their scientific careers; and that in addition to intimidation and inappropriate behavior there was "a component of sexual harassment". The Max Planck Institute for Extraterrestrial Physics announced that they will no longer work with him and the European Southern Observatory banned him from accessing their premises.

== Education and career ==
He received a bachelor's degree in mathematics (cum laude) in 1976, a bachelor's degree in astronomy (cum laude) in 1977 and a master's degree in astronomy (cum laude) in 1980, all from Leiden University. He graduated with a cum laude PhD in astronomy from Leiden University in 1984. From 1984 he worked in the US, first as a long-term member at the Institute for Advanced Study in Princeton, then, from 1988, as a senior research fellow at the California Institute of Technology. He returned to the Netherlands in 1990 to become professor of theoretical astronomy at Leiden.

In 1993 he became the founding director of NOVA, the Netherlands Research School for Astronomy, which coordinates the graduate education and astronomical research at the five university astronomy institutes in the Netherlands. NOVA's mission is to train young astronomers at the highest international level and to carry out frontline astronomical research in the Netherlands. Under his leadership, NOVA won the 1997 national competition for substantial long-term strategic research funding. This resulted in Dutch participation in the development of many VLT/VLTI instruments, the Band 9 ALMA receivers, in studies for E-ELT instruments, and in an instrument for the James Webb Space Telescope (JWST).

He was Scientific Director of Leiden Observatory 2003–2007, a research institute in the College of Mathematics and Natural Sciences of Leiden University.

From 2007–2017 he was the Director General of European Southern Observatory, when the Very Large Telescope on Paranal was equipped with powerful second generation instruments (X-SHOOTER, KMOS, MUSE, SPHERE, GRAVITY, ESPRESSO), built in partnership with institutions in the ESO Member States. After the end of his mandate at ESO, de Zeeuw returned to Leiden Observatory. He collaborated with the optical/IR group of Reinhard Genzel at the Max Planck Institute for Extraterrestrial Physics, where he had a secondary affiliation until 2022. He retired from Leiden University in December 2022 at age 66.

He was elected a member of the Royal Netherlands Academy of Arts and Sciences in 2006 and a Legacy Fellow of the American Astronomical Society in 2020. He received the 2001 Descartes-Huygens prize for his contribution to the French-Dutch scientific collaborations. In 2009 he was awarded the Brouwer Award by the Division on Dynamical Astronomy of the American Astronomical Society. On 14 May 2018 at the annual Netherlands Astronomy Conference, he was awarded the Order of the Netherlands Lion.

== Suspension ==
In October 2022 it was announced that in May that year, De Zeeuw had been suspended from the University of Leiden and barred from campus after being found to have violated professional conduct policy pertaining to harassment and sexual harassment of female employees. In an interview President of Leiden Executive Board Annetje Ottow acknowledged that "there was a pattern" and over several years he repeatedly belittled and insulted women in public and abused his position of power as a professor by threatening to damage their scientific careers; and that in addition to intimidation and inappropriate behavior there was "a component of sexual harassment". He was suspended with pay and allowed to use his university affiliation on his research papers, but barred from campus, interaction with students, and all administrative and department responsibilities. De Zeeuw stood a few months before retirement and the University of Leiden did not start the longer process of sending him into early retirement. Via his lawyer, de Zeeuw stated that he "cannot agree" with the suspension but that he will comply with the imposed measures.

A European Southern Observatory press officer declined to say whether ESO, which is headquartered near Munich, ever received similar complaints. A subsequent public statement from the ESO reported that the organization had banned de Zeeuw from its premises, and would revoke access to his IT account. On 26 October the Max Planck Institute for Extraterrestrial Physics severed his affiliation, citing the "proceedings and conclusions of Leiden University". De Zeeuw was subsequently suspended from the Royal Academy of the Netherlands, and in his reaction indicated that he would like to terminate his membership in the Academy. De Zeeuw has also been removed from the advisory board of Dutch research funder NWO.

== Research ==
ESO and its 50th Anniversary, by ESO Director General, Tim de Zeeuw

De Zeeuw's research concentrates on the formation, structure and dynamics of galaxies, including our own, the Milky Way. In Leiden, he led a group active in the construction of state-of-the-art dynamical models for galaxies, and their comparison to high-quality photometric and spectroscopic observations, with the aim of establishing the properties of dark matter halos around galaxies, probing the supermassive nuclear black holes, measuring the kinematics and dynamics of the different stellar populations, and ultimately understanding the process of galaxy formation. A significant second line of research is the study of the origin, structure, and evolution of young stellar groups in the Solar Neighbourhood.

Trained as a theorist in stellar dynamics, he gradually expanded his research to include the analysis and interpretation of observations, and also became involved in the development of new instrumentation. In 1995 he initiated a project with R. Bacon and R. Davies to build SAURON, a panoramic integral-field spectrograph for the 4.2-m William Herschel Telescope (WHT). The SAURON collaboration led to follow-up projects studying galactic nuclei with the VLT, to the initiative to move the integral field spectrograph OASIS from the Canada France Hawaii Telescope to the WHT and to equip the WHT with a laser guide-star, to participation in studies for possible integral-field units on the Hubble Space Telescope and JWST, and to participation in the development of MUSE for the VLT. In 2016 de Zeeuw initiated the Fornax3D project, a comprehensive MUSE study of the early-type galaxies in the Fornax Cluster, which provided new insights in the dynamics and stellar populations in a cluster environment.

De Zeeuw has authored or co-authored 300 refereed papers and many other contributing papers. He has supervised the research projects of 25 master students and has guided the research of 75 graduate students and postdocs. Many now have tenured positions in astronomy, and two of them (Marijn Franx and Amina Helmi) have won the Spinoza Award. Amina was awarded the 2026 Kavli Prize in Astrophysics. De Zeeuw holds honorary doctorates from the Université Claude Bernard Lyon, University of Padua and the University of Chicago.

Together with W. van Saarloos and L. Peletier, he co-founded the Lorentz Center, the International Center for Astronomy, Mathematics and Physics, in Leiden, and served on its steering committee for a decade.

De Zeeuw chaired the Board of the UK/NL/ES Isaac Newton Group of Telescopes on La Palma from 1999–2002. De Zeeuw served on the HST Time Allocation Committee, chaired the Space Telescope Institute Council for four years and also served on the board of directors of the US-based Association of Universities for Research in Astronomy. Between 2003 and 2006 he was a member of ESO's governing body, the Council, and chaired the Council Scientific Strategy Working Group. In this capacity he contributed to the development of ESO's strategic goals in 2004 and to changes in the ESO committee structure including the new terms of reference for the STC and OPC. He was the principal author of a report to Council outlining three scenarios for ESO's future role in European astronomy. In 2006/07 he chaired the Science Vision Working Group set up by ASTRONET, an ERA-NET activity funded by the European Commission and set up by funding agencies in Europe. The Science Vision Working Group established a global European Science Vision for Astronomy for the next 20 years.
