= Elisabeth Isaksson =

Swedish glaciologist and geologist

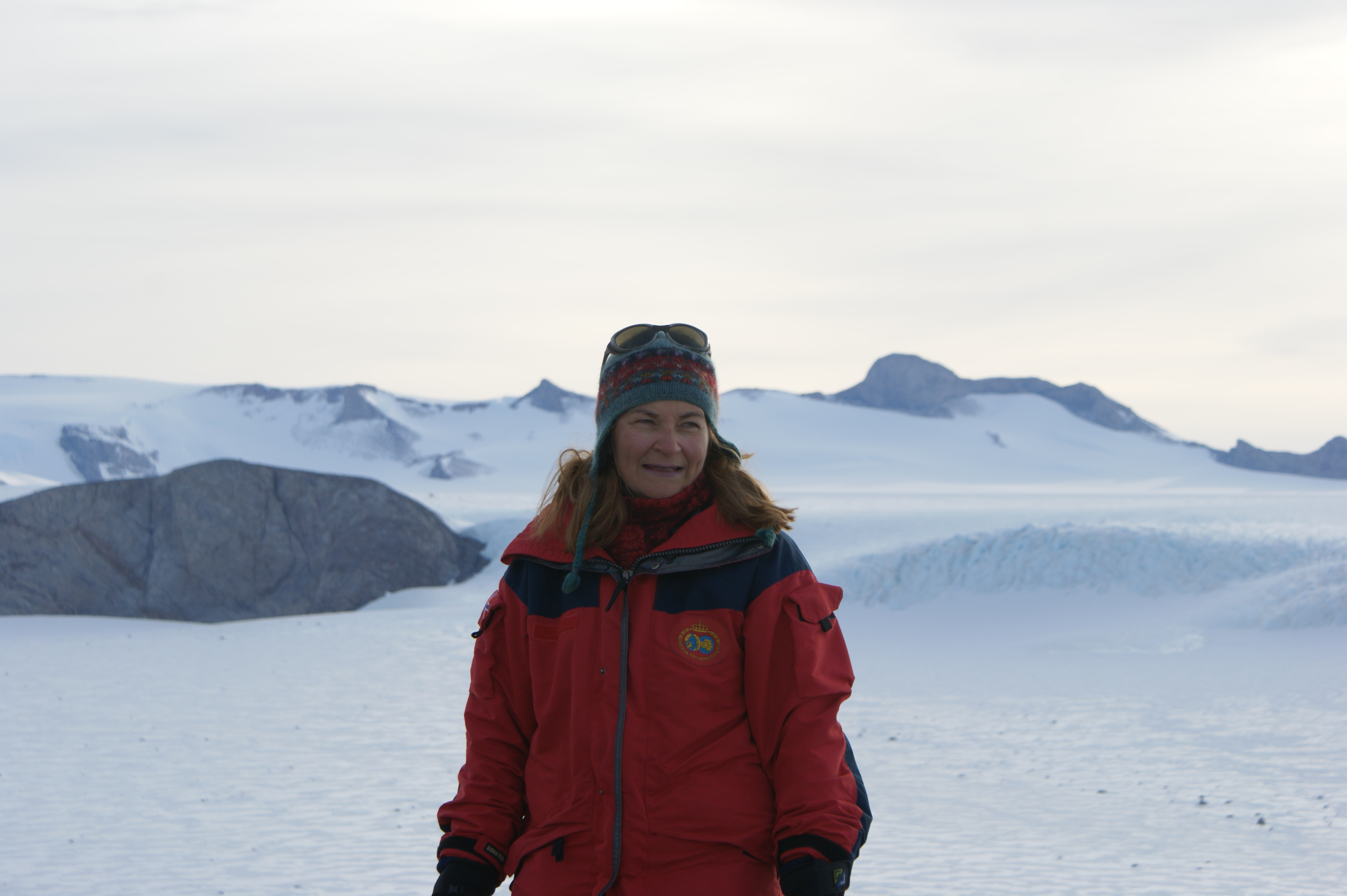
- Education: BSc Umeå University; MSc University of Maine; PhD Stockholm University
- Scientific career
- Fields: Glaciology; Geology
- Workplaces: Norwegian Polar Institute
- Website: www.npolar.no/en/people/elisabeth.isaksson

Elisabeth Isaksson is a Swedish glaciologist and geologist who has researched polar climate history on the basis of ice cores. She has also studied snow and ice pollution on the Norwegian island of Svalbard and has participated in award-winning European projects on Antarctic climate change.

== Education ==
Isaksson graduated in geoscience at Umeå University in 1986. She went on to gain an Fil. Lic. from Stockholm University and an M.Sc. from the University of Maine in 1991. With a thesis on Climate records from shallow firn cores, Dronning Maud Land, Antarctica, she was awarded a Ph.D. from Stockholm University in 1994.

== Career ==
Dr. Isaksson served as a research assistant on Antarctic projects at Stockholm University from 1988 to 1995 before assuming the role of glaciologist at the Norwegian Polar Institute in February 1995, a position she still holds today as the head of the Geology and Geophysics department. Since 2001, she has been involved in studying ice-core records from Lomonsovfonna on Svalbard, contributing to numerous papers on climate change spanning the past 800 years.

Thanks to changes in attitudes towards the acceptance of women in the field since the 1990s, Isaksson has enjoyed a successful career as a glaciologist for over 25 years. While pursuing her doctorate under Wibjörn Karlén, she conducted research on Kebnekaise, Sweden's highest mountain. At the Norwegian Polar Institute, she has made significant contributions to research on holocene climate changes in Antarctica through analysis of ice and marine sediment cores, as well as studies on nuclear fallout over Norwegian territories. Additionally, she has collaborated with the United States on research regarding climate variability in East Antarctica. Isaksson has been a key participant in the European EPICA Antarctic climate project which received the Descartes Prize in 2007.

== Personal life ==
In 1990, Isaksson married the American glaciologist Jack Kohler from Philadelphia who is also employed by the Norwegian Polar Institute. They have two children. Their home is in Tromsø in the far north of Norway.
