= Michiel van der Klis =

Dutch astronomer

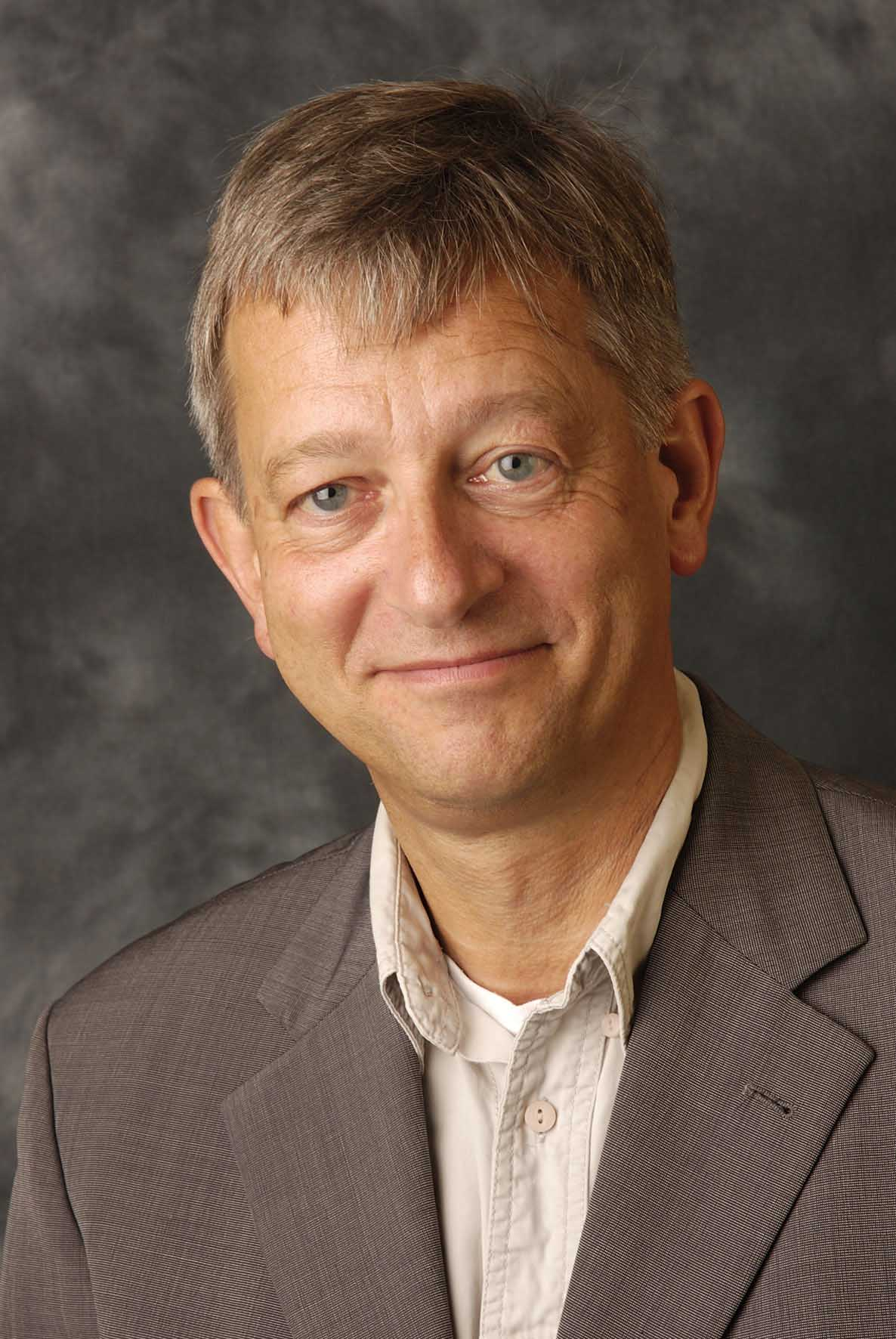
- Born: 9 June 1953 (age 73); The Hague, Netherlands
- Citizenship: Dutch
- Education: University of Amsterdam
- Known for: X-ray binaries, Quasi-periodic oscillations
- Awards: Bruno Rossi Prize (1987), Spinoza Prize (2004), KNAW Academy Professorship (2010)
- Scientific career
- Fields: Astronomy, Astrophysics
- Workplaces: Astronomical Institute Anton Pannekoek, University of Amsterdam
- Doctoral advisor: Ed van den Heuvel
- Doctoral students: Rudy Wijnands

Michiel Baldur Maximiliaan van der Klis (born 9 June 1953) is a Dutch astronomer best known for his work on extreme 'pairings' of stars called X-ray binaries, more particularly his explanation of the occurrence of quasi-periodic oscillations (QPOs) in these systems and his co-discovery of the first millisecond X-ray pulsar. In the 1980s he gained worldwide fame with his investigation of QPOs. His revolutionary discoveries have had an enormous impact in his field of research; in effect, they have made it what it is today. Van der Klis pioneered special mathematical analysis techniques that are now regarded as the “gold standard” within his discipline.

== Research ==
Van der Klis's research focuses on X-ray binaries, pairs of stars orbiting each other that emit X-ray radiation. Some binary star systems contain a compact object like a neutron star or a black hole. By studying the dynamics of materials in the vicinity of such objects one can learn about their mass, radius and rotational speed. Moreover, this kind of research provides a testing ground for cosmology and general relativity.

Van der Klis made a number of breakthrough discoveries. In 1984 he discovered the first type of QPOs (quasi-periodic oscillations of the X-ray emission) of compact stars while he was working with ESA's EXOSAT satellite to study the strongest X-ray sources near the centre of the Milky Way. One of his achievements is the explanation in 1985 why X-rays emitted from binary systems do not come in steady pulses (like the radiowaves emitted by pulsars), but in short irregular bursts. His studies in the years 1984-1987 clarified the principles for classifying the several hundreds of strong X-ray sources known to exist in our Galaxy. In the 1990s, he and his research group, including Rudy Wijnands, discovered the first millisecond X-ray pulsar in a binary system, SAX J1808.4-3658, a neutron star spinning around its axis more than 400 times per second. The discovery of this superfast spinning neutron star attracted great international attention.

== Academic career ==
Van der Klis obtained his PhD at University of Amsterdam in 1983 working on observations of X-ray binaries. For a while he worked at the ESA lab ESTEC in Noordwijk. In 1989 he returned to the University of Amsterdam as an associate professor and was made full professor of Astronomy in 1993. Since 2002 he is an elected member of the Royal Netherlands Academy of Arts and Sciences (KNAW) and since 2003 also of the Koninklijke Hollandsche Maatschappij der Wetenschappen (KHMW). Since 2005 he is Director of the Astronomical Institute Anton Pannekoek of the University of Amsterdam and Chair of the Netherlands Research School for Astronomy (NOVA).

== Honors and awards ==
Van der Klis received a number of awards for his pioneering research, including the Bruno Rossi Prize (1987), the most important international distinction awarded in high-energy astrophysics, and the Spinoza Prize (2004). On April 27, 2010, the Royal Netherlands Academy of Arts and Sciences (KNAW) awarded an Academy Professorship to him. The international review committee noted: "He is a world leader in the X-ray radiation of compact objects and has formulated an intriguing connection between black holes and neutron stars, the two most extreme objects in the universe. He and his research group also discovered the first X-ray pulsar with a rotation speed of four hundred revolutions per second."

He was elected a Legacy Fellow of the American Astronomical Society in 2020.

== Awards ==
- 1987 Bruno Rossi Prize
- 1990 COSPAR Zel'dovich Medal
- 1991 NWO Pionier grant
- 1998 Visiting Miller Professorship Award, University of California Berkeley
- 2004 Spinoza Prize
- 2010 KNAW Academy Professorship
