= Mészáros effect =

Evolution of Cold Dark Matter perturbations

The Mészáros effect "is the main physical process that alters the shape of the initial power spectrum of fluctuations in the cold dark matter theory of cosmological structure formation". It was introduced in 1974 by Péter Mészáros considering the behavior of dark matter perturbations in the range around the radiation-matter equilibrium redshift $z_\text{eq}$ and up to the radiation decoupling redshift $z_\text{dec}$. This showed that, for a non-baryonic cold dark matter not coupled to radiation, the small initial perturbations expected to give rise to the present day large scale structures experience below $z_{eq}$ an additional distinct growth period which alters the initial fluctuation power spectrum, and allows sufficient time for the fluctuations to grow into galaxies and galaxy clusters by the present epoch. This involved introducing and solving a joint radiation plus dark matter perturbation equation for the density fluctuations $\Delta \rho$,

$$\delta'' + \frac{2+3y}{2y(1+y)}\delta' - \frac{3}{2y(1+y)} \delta = 0 ,$$

in which $\delta \equiv \Delta\rho/\langle \rho \rangle$, the variable $y = \rho_m/\rho_r = a/a_\text{eq}$, and $a$ is the length scale parametrizing the expansion of the Universe. The analytical solution has a growing mode $\delta \propto 1 + \tfrac{3}{2} y$. This is referred to as the Mészáros effect, or Mészáros equation. The process is independent of whether the cold dark matter consists of elementary particles or macroscopic objects. It determines the cosmological transfer function of the original fluctuation spectrum, and it has been incorporated in all subsequent treatments of cosmological large scale structure evolution (e.g.).

A more specific galaxy formation scenario involving this effect was discussed by Mészáros in 1975 explicitly assuming that the dark matter might consist of approximately solar mass primordial black holes, an idea which has received increased attention (e.g.) after the discovery in 2015 of gravitational waves from stellar-mass black holes.
