= Science Communication Prize =

The Science Communication Prize is an annual award in science writing given by the European Commission.

It was begun as a Descartes Prize in 2004, but in 2007 was separated to its own prize.

It is a "prize of prizes" that is only open to winners of other award schemes from the year preceding the award. Eligible forms of science communication include public engagement, written communication including newspaper articles and popular science books, audio-visual media including TV programmes and websites, and "innovative action".

Proposals (also referred to as submissions) received are judged and a shortlist of nominees are announced, from which five Laureates (finalists) and five Winners are announced at a prize ceremony in December each year.
