= Warren Goldstein (professor) =

Dr Warren Goldstein taught U.S. history and chaired the History Department in the College of Arts and Sciences at the University of Hartford.

Over a 30-year academic and writing career, Goldstein published five books: Playing for Keeps: A History of Early Baseball (Cornell, 1989), A Brief History of American Sports. Co-authored with Elliott J. Gorn. (Hill & Wang, 1993) Second Edition, University of Illinois, 2013. William Sloane Coffin, Jr.: A Holy Impatience. (Yale, 2004). Paperback, 2006. Time to Learn: How a New School Schedule is Making Smarter Kids, Happier Parents, and Safer Neighborhoods. Co-authored with Christopher Gabrieli. (Jossey-Bass, 2008). For the Love of Physics: From the End of the Rainbow to the Edge of Time—A Journey Through the Wonders of Physics. Co-authored with Walter Lewin. (Free Press, 2011).

In April 2021 it was found that Goldstein shared an email on his screen during class revealing that he and President Gregory S. Woodward were discussing "Spin-Doctoring" numbers in efforts to support their move to Division III sports.
