= Anders Karlsson (physicist) =

Swedish physicist (born 1964)

Anders Karlsson (born 1964 in Järna, Sweden) is a Swedish physicist who is working in scientific publishing.

Karlsson graduated 1987 from the Royal Institute of Technology in Stockholm with a Master of Science degree in engineering physics. He received a Ph.D. in 1992 with a thesis on quantum noise in semiconductor lasers and laser amplifiers. In 2001 he became professor of quantum photonics at the Royal Institute of Technology, as part of a position as a special research fellow with the Swedish Research Council from 2001 to 2007. His research areas were quantum photonics and quantum information. In 2004, the multinational research project Karlsson coordinated, IST-QuComm, was awarded the Descartes Prize. The project had demonstrated that quantum cryptography could be used in practice for fundamentally secure communications.

Karlsson was Counselor for Science and Innovation at Embassy of Sweden in Tokyo from 2007 to 2012. In 2012 he joined Elsevier as Vice President of Global Strategic Networks, based in Tokyo, where he covers the Asia-Pacific region.
