= Christine Jones Forman =

American astrophysicist and astronomer

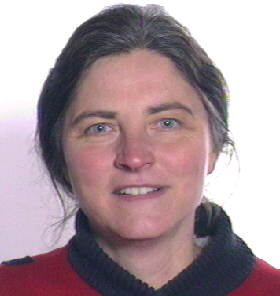
- Education: Harvard University, 1971, 1972, 1974
- Known for: Director of the Consortium for Unlocking the Mysteries of the Universe Host of Shedding Light on Science
- Spouse: William "Bill" R. Forman
- Awards: Bruno Rossi Prize, 2013 Secretary's Distinguished Research Lecture Award of the Smithsonian Institution
- Scientific career
- Fields: Astrophysics
- Workplaces: Center for Astrophysics | Harvard & Smithsonian
- Thesis: X-ray and optical observations of galactic X-ray sources (1974)
- Doctoral advisor: William Liller

Christine Jones Forman is a senior astrophysicist at the Center for Astrophysics | Harvard & Smithsonian. She is a past president of the American Astronomical Society, and was the director of the Smithsonian Institution's Consortium for Unlocking the Mysteries of the Universe.

== Education and career ==
In high school Forman attended the Ross Mathematics Program, Arnold Ross' summer mathematics program for gifted high school students. She finished high school in West Carrollton, Ohio, before moving to Cambridge, Massachusetts, where she earned three astrophysics degrees from Harvard University: an AB in 1971, AM in 1972, and PhD in 1974. During her time as a student, Forman was both a post-doctoral fellow at the Center for Astrophysics and a Harvard Junior Fellow.

Forman has been an astrophysicist at the Smithsonian Astrophysical Observatory since 1973 and previously served as the head of the Chandra Calibration Group from 1990 to 2010. In 2010, Forman was named director of the Consortium for Unlocking the Mysteries of the Universe, and became one of four directors of the Smithsonian Institution's Consortia for the Four Grand Challenges of the Strategic Plan.

== Honors ==
In 1985, Forman and her husband William R. Forman were the first recipients of the Bruno Rossi Prize, an award given annually by the American Astronomical Society "for a significant contribution to High Energy Astrophysics, with particular emphasis on recent, original work." They received a $500 reward and a certificate "for pioneering work in the study of X-ray emission from early type galaxies."

In 2013, Forman became the 14th recipient of the Secretary's Distinguished Research Lecture Award of the Smithsonian Institution.

== Personal life ==
Forman is married to astrophysicist Bill Forman. Together they have three children: Julia, Daniel, and Miranda.
