= Catherine Cesarsky =

Argentina astronomer

Catherine J. Cesarsky
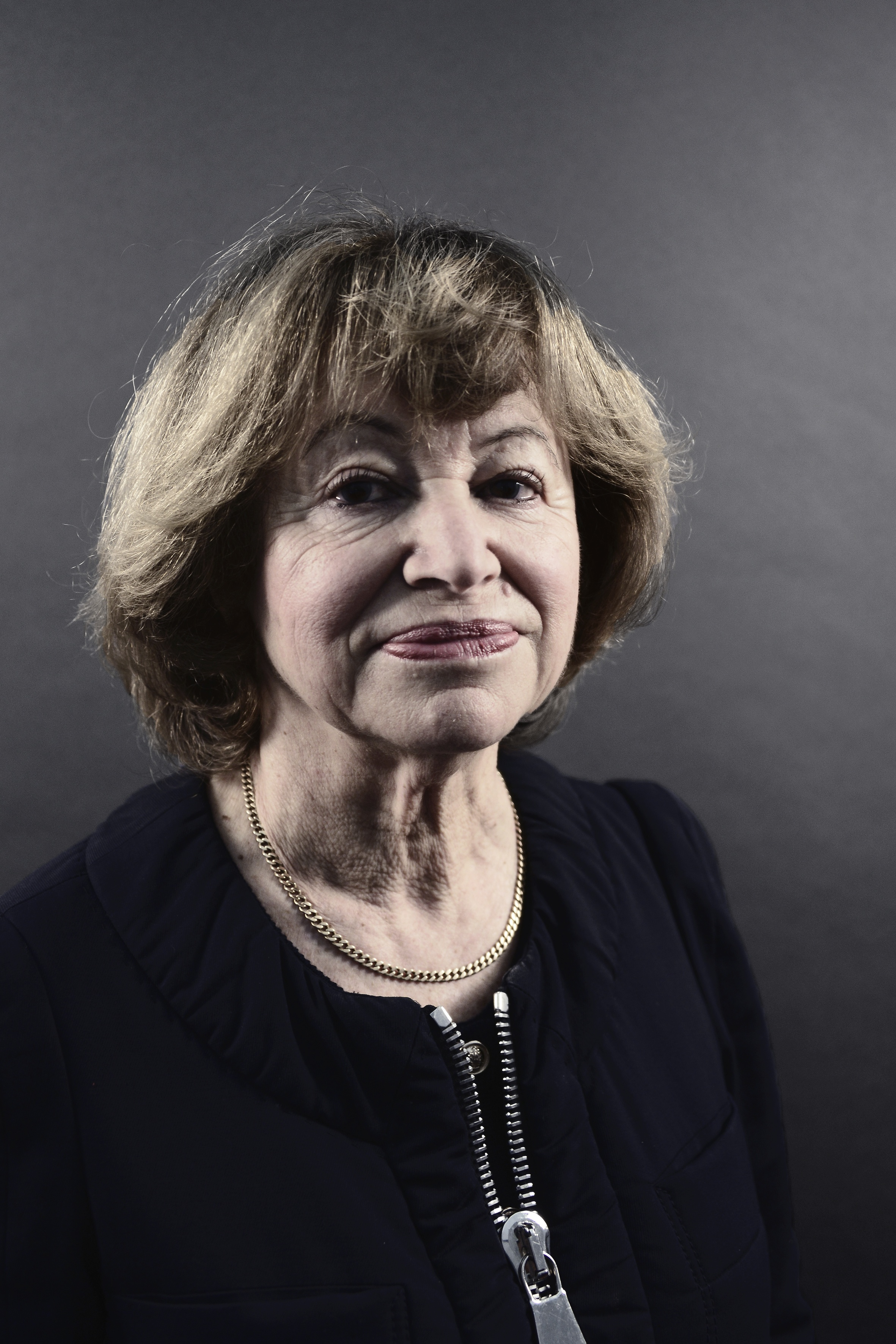
- Catherine J. Cesarsky
- Born: 24 February 1943 (age 83); Ambazac, France
- Education: University of Buenos Aires; Harvard University
- Known for: Designing the ISOCAM camera on board the Infrared Space Observatory
- Awards: COSPAR Space Science Award (1998); Prix Jules Janssen (2009); Tate medal (2020); Fritz Zwicky Prize (2024)
- Scientific career
- Fields: Astronomer
- Workplaces: SKAO Council; European Southern Observatory; Germany
- Thesis: Interactions of Cosmic Rays with Hydromagnetic Waves in the Galaxy (1971)

Catherine Jeanne Cesarsky (born Catherine Jeanne Gattegno on 24 February 1943) is an French-Argentine astronomer, known for her research activities in astrophysics and for her leadership in astronomy and atomic energy. She is the current chairperson of the Square Kilometre Array's governing body, SKAO Council. She was the first female president of the International Astronomical Union (2006-2009) and the first female director general of the European Southern Observatory (1999-2007).

== Education ==
Born in France, Catherine Cesarsky was largely raised in Argentina and she received a degree in physical sciences at the University of Buenos Aires. She graduated with a PhD in astronomy in 1971 from Harvard University (Cambridge, Mass., USA). Her thesis focused on the propagation of cosmic rays in the galaxy and was advised by physicist Russell Kulsrud.

== Career ==
After obtaining her PhD, Dr. Cesarsky was awarded a postdoctoral research fellowship at the California Institute of Technology for three years, where she worked with Peter Goldreich.

In 1974, she moved to France, becoming a staff member of the Service d'Astrophysique, Direction des Sciences de la Matière, Commissariat à l'Energie Atomique, and she established her further career in France. From 1985 to 1993, she was the head of the Service d'Astrophysique. Later, as Director of Direction des Sciences de la Matière from 1994 to 1999, she led about 3000 scientists, engineers and technicians active within a broad spectrum of basic research programmes in physics, chemistry, astrophysics and earth sciences. From 1999 to 2007, she was the Director General of the European Southern Observatory; she was thus responsible for the end of construction of the Very Large Telescope (VLT) and its instruments and for the operations, for the conclusion of the agreements and the first part of the construction of Atacama Large Millimeter Array (ALMA), and she launched the studies for the European Extremely Large Telescope.

She was the High Commissioner for Atomic Energy in France from 2009 to 2012 and remains a scientific advisor to the French government for science and energy issues. She chairs the Science Program Committee of the French space agency, Centre National d'Etudes Spatiales, and the Consultative Committee for the Fusion Programme of the European Atomic Energy Community (CCE-FU).

From August 2006 to August 2009, she was President of the International Astronomical Union, the first woman to hold the position. She became chairman of the board of the Square Kilometre Array Organisation in 2017 and took on the post of chairperson of its successor governing body, SKAO Council, in 2021.

== Research ==
Dr. Cesarsky is known for her research activities in several central areas of modern astrophysics. The first part of her career was devoted to the high-energy domain. This has involved studies of the propagation and composition of galactic cosmic rays, of matter and fields in the diffuse interstellar medium, as well as the acceleration of particles in astrophysical shocks, e.g. in connection with supernovae.

She then turned to infrared astronomy. She was the principal investigator of the camera on board the Infrared Space Observatory of the European Space Agency, which flew between 1995 and 1998. As such, she has led the central programme, which studied the infrared emission from a variety of galactic and extragalactic sources and which has yielded new and exciting results on star formation and galactic evolution. These studies were consolidated and refined via further observations with the European Southern Observatory Very Large Telescope (ESO VLT), and the Spitzer Space Telescope and Herschel Space Observatory.

== Awards and distinctions ==
Cesarsky is a Member of the Academia Europaea, the International Academy of Astronautics, and a Foreign Member of the Royal Swedish Academy of Sciences. In 2010, she received an honorary degree from the University of Geneva. Other awards and honours include:

- 1989 – Chevalier of the Ordre National du Mérite
- 1994 – Chevalier of the Légion d'Honneur
- 1998 – Recipient of the Committee on Space Research Space Sciences Award
- 1999 – Officier of the Ordre national du Mérite
- 2004 – Officier of the Légion d'Honneur
- 2005 – Foreign Associate of the National Academy of Sciences of the United States of America
- 2005 – Foreign Member of the Royal Society of London (2005)
- 2007 – Member of the French Academy of Sciences
- 2008 – Commandeur of the Ordre national du Mérite
- 2009 – Prix Jules Janssen of the Société astronomique de France
- 2011 – Commandeur of the Légion d'Honneur
- 2018 – Grand Officier of the Légion d'Honneur
- 2020 – Tate medal awarded by the American Institute of Physics every two years to non-US citizens for their leadership
- 2024 – Fritz Zwicky Prize for Astrophysics and Cosmology

== See also ==
- List of women in leadership positions on astronomical instrumentation projects
