= Walter Harrison (university administrator) =

American university administrator

5th President of the University of Hartford
- In office July 1998 – July 2017
- Preceded by: Humphrey Tonkin
- Succeeded by: Gregory S. Woodward

Personal details
- Born: Walter Lee Harrison; May 15, 1946 Pittsburgh, Pennsylvania
- Education: Trinity College (BA); University of Michigan (MA); UC Davis Ph.D.

Military service
- Allegiance: United States
- Branch/service: United States Air Force
- Rank: Captain

Walter Lee Harrison is an American university administrator, and former president of the University of Hartford. Harrison is currently President and CEO of the Jewish Community Foundation of Greater Hartford. He also sits on the board of trustees for Trinity College in Hartford, Connecticut.

A native of Pittsburgh. Harrison graduated from Trinity College in 1968, and earned a master's degree from the University of Michigan in 1969. He subsequently served as a captain in the United States Air Force before earning his doctorate from the University of California, Davis.

== Career ==
Harrison began his career as an educator, teaching English and American Studies at Johannes Gutenberg University of Mainz in Mainz, Germany, Iowa State University, and Colorado College.

Following his educational career, Harrison left full-time teaching to take an administrative position at Colorado College. He joined Gehrung Associates University Relations Counselors in 1985, where he worked with such clients as the Kellogg School of Management at Northwestern University, Bryn Mawr College, Smith College, and Williams College. He became president of the firm shortly thereafter. In 1989, Harrison moved to the University of Michigan, where he became vice president of university relations and secretary of the university.

=== University of Hartford ===
Harrison became the fifth president of the University of Hartford in 1998. During Harrison's tenure, the university has undertaken a vigorous and comprehensive building campaign in an attempt to modify the archaic and outdated structures, most of which were built in the 1960s. Building projects completed under Harrsion's presidency included the Hartford Arts school's visual arts complex, ISET science complex, Mort and Irma Performing Arts Center, and Shaw Center at Hillyer College. Harrison taught one English course per year at Hartford, in addition to being the university's president, he held the rank of resident professor. On June 30, 2017, Harrison retired from the University of Hartford. After the renovation of its libraries in 2016, the university announced that they would now be named the Harrison University Libraries.

== Awards and honors ==
Harrison chairs the National Collegiate Athletic Association's Committee on Academic Performance. In 2013, the Anti-Defamation League honored Harrison with the Torch of Liberty Award, which celebrates people who carry on a tradition of community service. In 2015, Harrison was named to the Knight Commission on Intercollegiate Athletics, which works to promote a reform agenda that emphasizes the educational mission of college sports. In 2017, the America East Conference renamed its academic cup to the Walter Harrison Academic Cup. The cup is presented to the institution whose student-athletes post the highest grade-point average during that academic year.

Academic offices
Preceded by Humphrey Tonkin	5th President of the University of Hartford; 1998–2017	Succeeded by Gregory S. Woodward
