= Anne Barbara Underhill =

Canadian astrophysicist

Anne Barbara Underhill FRSC
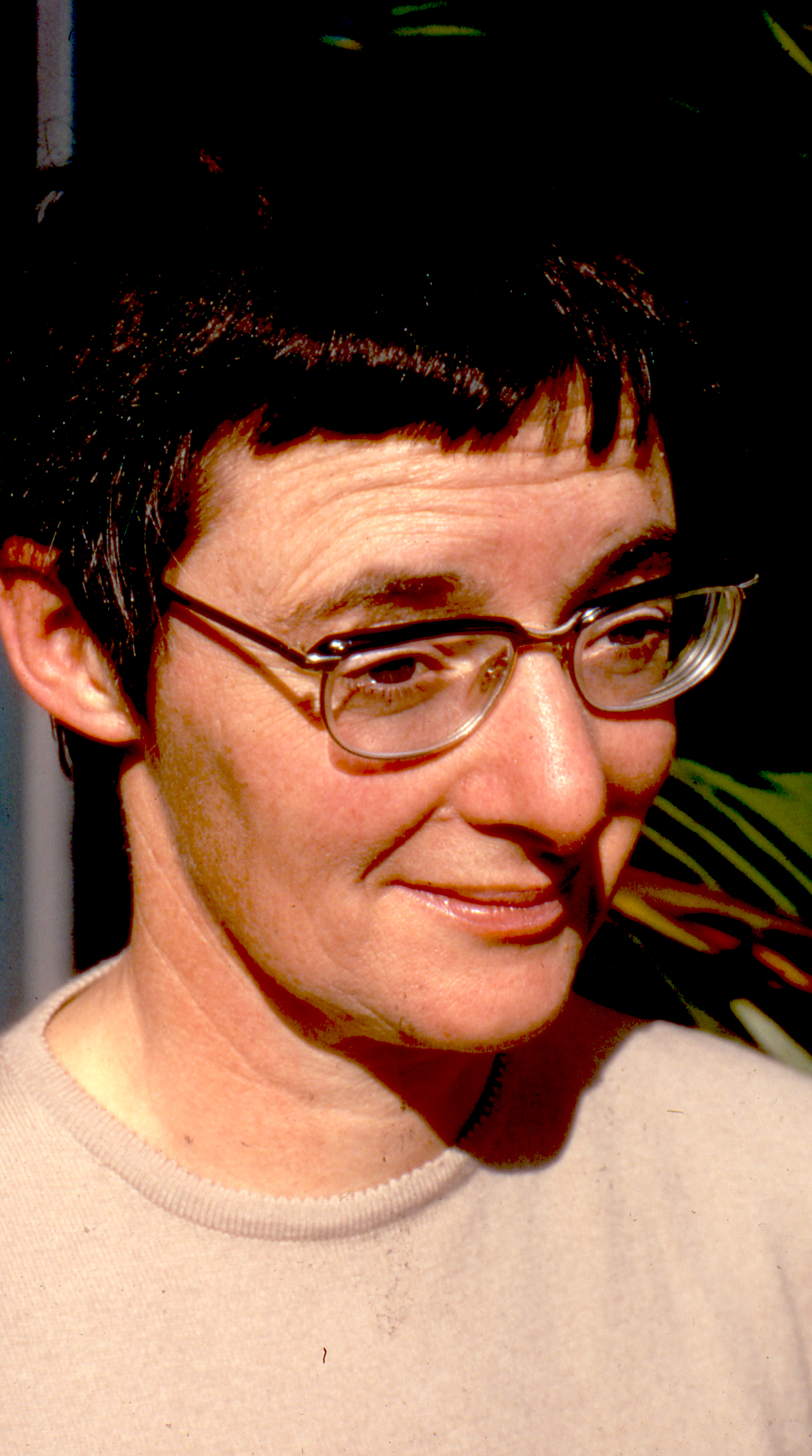
- Underhill in 1970
- Born: 12 June 1920; Vancouver, British Columbia, Canada
- Died: 3 July 2003 (aged 83); Vancouver, British Columbia, Canada
- Education: University of British Columbia; University of Chicago
- Known for: early-type star research
- Awards: Honorary Degree, University of York (1969); FRSC (1985); D.S. Beals Award (1985); D.Sc University of British Columbia (1992)
- Scientific career
- Workplaces: Dominion Astrophysical Observatory; Utrecht University; NASA Goddard Space Flight Center
- Thesis: Some aspects of B-type spectra (1948)
- Doctoral advisor: Subrahmanyan Chandrasekhar
- Doctoral students: Ed van den Heuvel

Anne Barbara Underhill FRSC (June 12, 1920 – July 3, 2003) was a Canadian astrophysicist. She is most widely known for her work on early-type stars and was considered one of the world's leading experts in the field. During her lifetime she received many awards for her contributions to astronomy and astrophysics.

== Early life ==
Underhill grew up in Vancouver, British Columbia. She was the only girl of five children born to European immigrants Irene Anna (née Creery) and civil engineer Frederic Clare Underhill. She was awarded the Lieutenant Governor's medal in high school for her outstanding school performance. She was close with her twin brother and three younger brothers, and helped to raise them following the death of her mother when she was 18. In 1944 her twin brother was killed in World War II.

== Education ==
Underhill graduated from the University of British Columbia in 1942 with a BA Hons in chemistry. She continued her education at the university and received a master's degree in physics and mathematics in 1944. After graduating with her MA she received a substantial scholarship from the Canadian Federation of University Women which enabled her to enroll at the University of Toronto; however, she left after a year because the university's astrophysics program was considered weak at that time. She went on to receive her Ph.D. from the University of Chicago in 1948 under the supervision of famous astrophysicist Subrahmanyan Chandrasekhar. Her thesis topic was multi-layered stellar atmospheres and contained the first model for this phenomenon.

== Career ==
From 1948 to 1949 she held an NRC Postdoctoral Fellowship at Copenhagen Observatory. In 1949, Underhill accepted a position as a research scientist at the Dominion Astrophysical Observatory (DAO), in Victoria, where she worked until 1962. During this time she was a visiting professor at both Harvard and Princeton universities. While at Princeton she used their computing facilities to write software to model stellar atmospheres. At the DAO she encountered sexism from her male PhD colleagues who limited her responsibilities while giving more to less qualified male coworkers.

In 1962 she unexpectedly received a letter of offer from the Utrecht University in the Netherlands for the position of full professor in astrophysics. She was reluctant to leave Canada so the decision to take the job was not an easy one despite the mistreatment she had experienced by her colleagues. At the Utrecht University she lectured at the graduate level and published The Early Type Stars. In 1970, she received a job offer arrived from NASA's Goddard Space Flight Center where she worked until her retirement 15 years later.

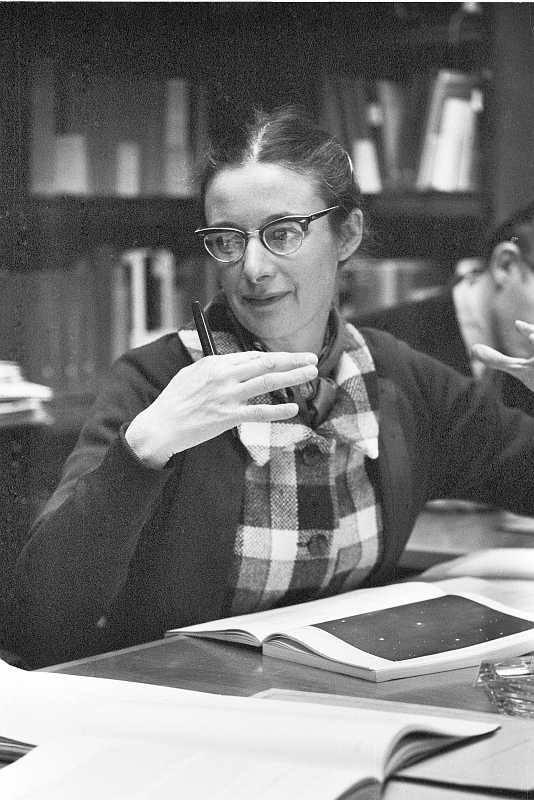
Anne Underhill in the library of Sonnenborgh, Utrecht Observatory, 1962-1965

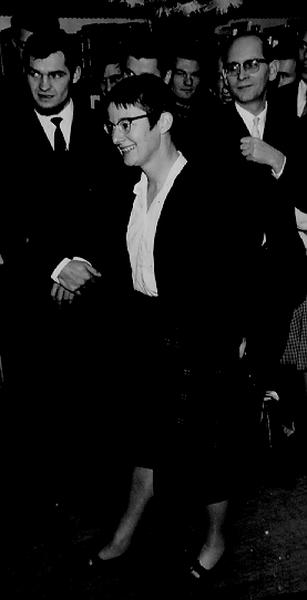
Anne Underhill with colleagues and students at the annual Sinterklaas party, Utrecht Observatory, 1967

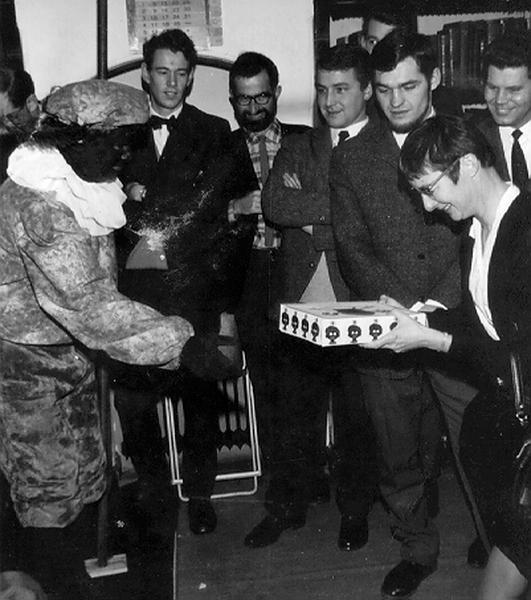
Sinterklaas party. A Zwarte Piet (a black pete, a joker chimney sweep) presents Underhill with a surprise gift, Utrecht Observatory, 1967

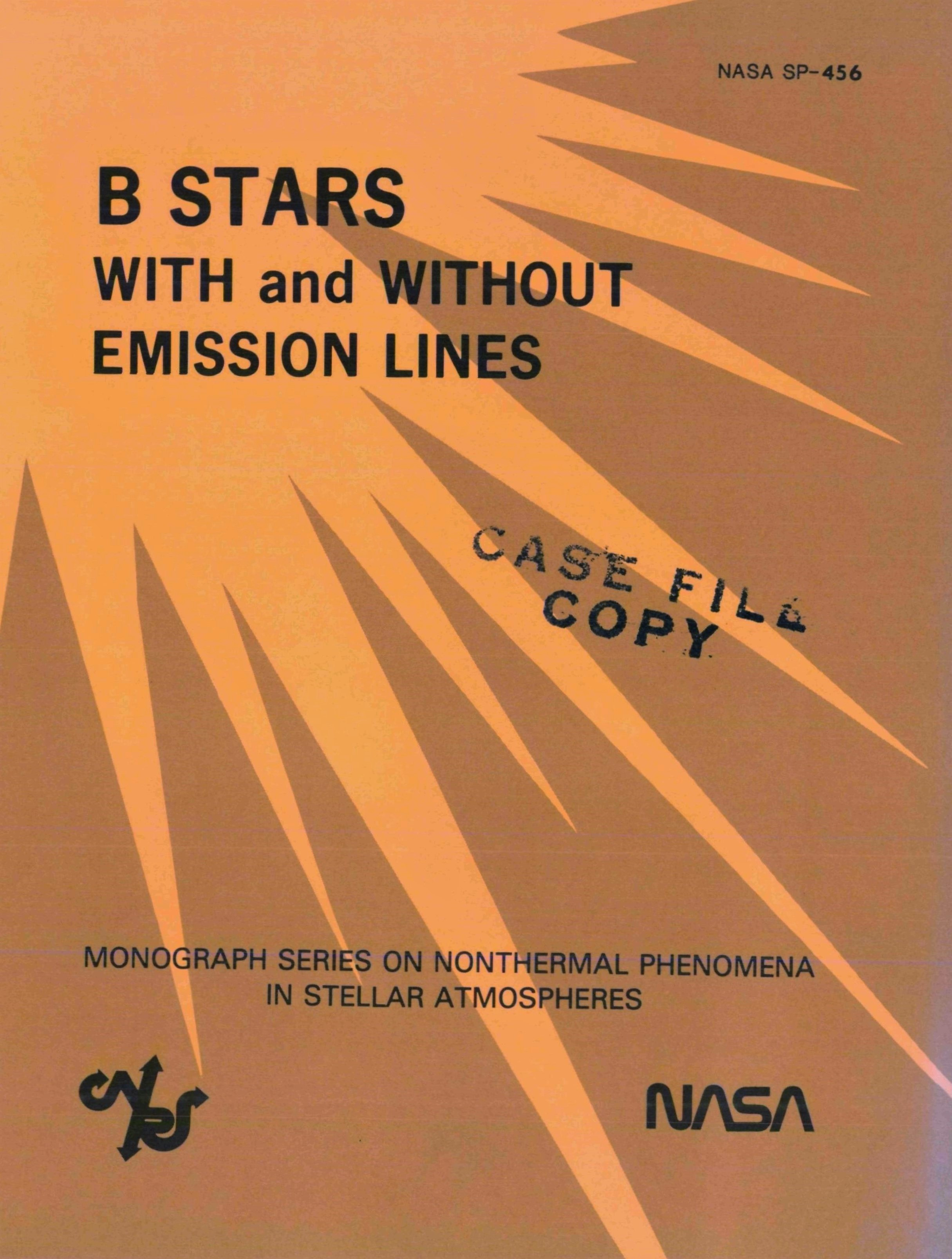
Anne Underhill and Vera Doazan: B stars with and without emission lines, NASA SP-456, 1982

== Publications ==
Including:

- 1948: Some Aspects of B-Type Spectra, PhD dissertation University of Chicago
- 1959 with John H Waddell: Stark broadening functions for the hydrogen lines, [Washington] U.S. Dept. of Commerce, National Bureau of Standards, 1959, National Bureau of Standards circular, 603
- 1966: The Early Type Stars, Dordrecht, Holland, D. Reidel. New York, Gordon and Breach, 1966
- 1982 with Vera Doazan: B stars with and without emission lines, Monograph series on nonthermal phenomena in stellar atmospheres, NASA SP (Series) 456. ntrs.nasa.gov Full-text PDF
- 1985 with A. G. Michalitsianos: The Origin of Nonradiative Heating/Momentum in Hot Stars, NASA Scientific and Technical Information Branch, 1985
- 1988 with P. S. Conti: O stars and Wolf-Rayet stars, Paris, France: CNRS; Washington, D.C. : National Aeronautics and Space Administration, Scientific and Technical Information Branch; [Springfield, Va.], Monograph series on nonthermal phenomena in stellar atmospheres; NASA SP (Series) 497.

== Dutch PhD students at Utrecht University ==
At Utrecht University Underhill supervised the following PhD junior researchers as promotor (doctoral advisor) or as copromotor (secondary doctoral advisor).

Promovendus	Dissertation	Year #descendants
de Groot, Martin Jan Hugo, doctoral advisor	On the Spectrum and Nature of P Cygni	1970
Lamers, Hermanus Johannes Gerardus Lambertus Maria, copromotor, with Cornelis de Jager doctoral advisor	Studies on the Structure and Stability of Extended Stellar Atmospheres	1974 4
van den Heuvel, Edward Peter Jacobus, copromotor, with Cornelis de Jager doctoral advisor	A Study of Stellar Rotation : The Origin of Peculiar and Metallic-Line A and B Stars	1968 36
