= Ewine van Dishoeck =

Dutch astronomer and chemist

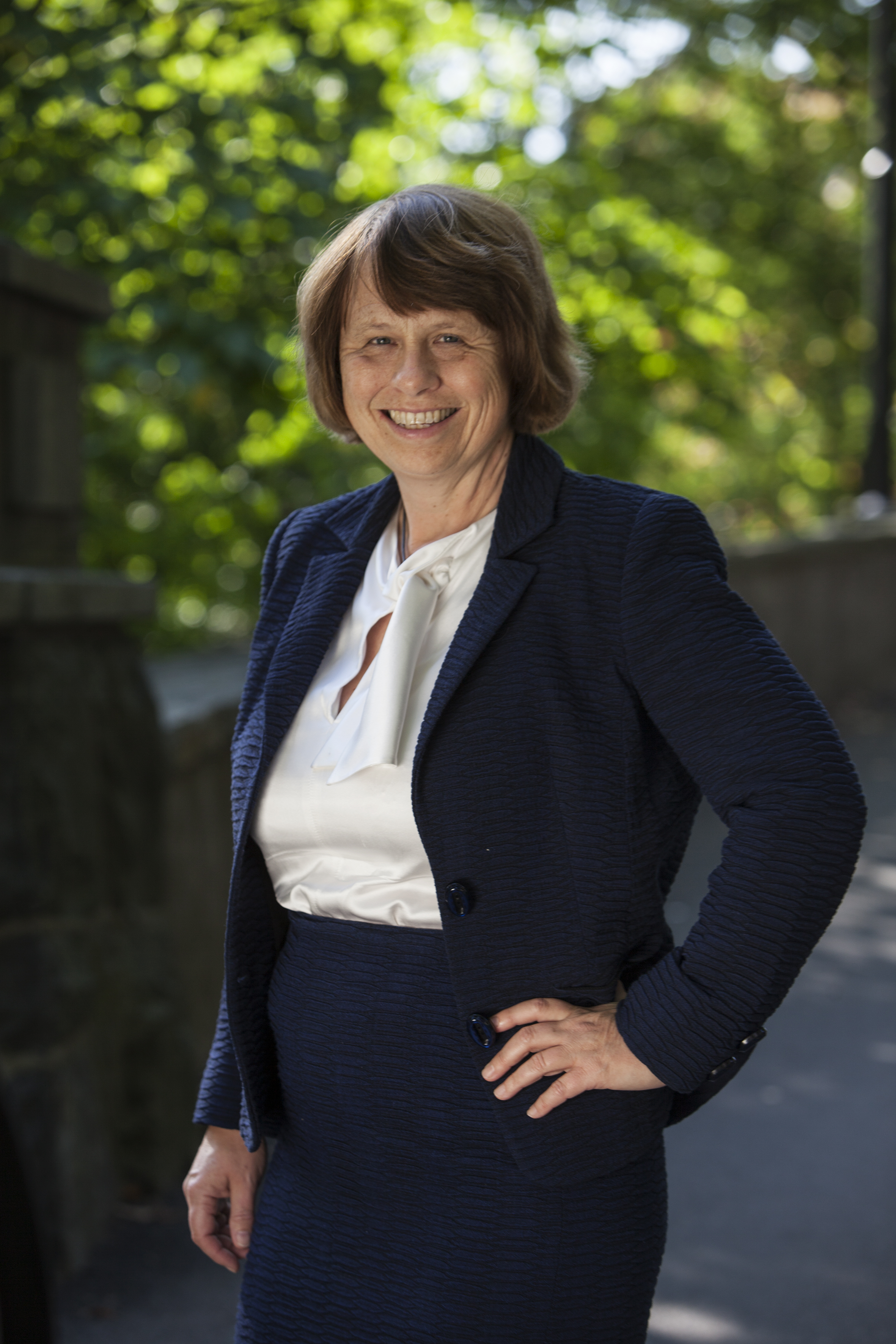
- Ewine van Dishoeck (2014)
- Born: 13 June 1955 (age 71); Leiden, Netherlands
- Spouse: Tim de Zeeuw
- Awards: Fritz Zwicky Prize for Astrophysics and Cosmology (2022); Kavli Prize for Astrophysics (2018); James Craig Watson Medal (2018); Albert Einstein World Award of Science (2015); Gothenburg Lise Meitner Prize (2014); Bourke Award (2001); Spinoza Prize (2000); Gold Medal of the Royal Dutch Chemical Society (1994)
- Scientific career
- Fields: Astrochemistry, Astronomy, Chemistry
- Doctoral advisors: Harm Habing; Alexander Dalgarno
- Doctoral students: Nienke van der Marel
- Website: home.strw.leidenuniv.nl/~ewine/

Ewine Fleur van Dishoeck (born 13 June 1955) is a Dutch astronomer and chemist. She is Professor of Molecular Astrophysics at Leiden Observatory, and served as the President of the International Astronomical Union (2018–2021) and a co-editor of the Annual Review of Astronomy and Astrophysics (2012–present). She is one of the pioneers of astrochemistry, and her research is aimed at determination of the structure of cosmic objects using their molecular spectra.

== Early life ==
Ewine Fleur van Dishoeck was born on June 13, 1955, in Leiden, Netherlands. With her father being a professor of ear, nose, and throat medicine, her love of science was inspired at the young age of 12. During this time, her father was invited to spend six months in San Diego, CA. Her first science class ever was through the San Diego Public School system. She fondly remembers that her science teacher, a female and African-American in the 1960s, was forced to overcome many obstacles to reach the position she is at now. Her upbringing inspired Van Dishoeck to gain an interest in science and have the desire to do great things in the world of chemistry. When she went back to the Netherlands, she was motivated to pursue a career in chemistry, with the University of Leiden being the launchpad for her research.

== Education and career ==
Ewine van Dishoeck studied chemistry at the University of Leiden. At Leiden, Van Dishoeck found that physics interested her as well. Her interests began shifting toward chemical physics soon after, with quantum chemistry being one of the main focal points of her senior project research. Tragedy struck when the only full professor at Leiden who specialized in quantum chemistry died. PhD programs in Holland require the thesis to be supervised by a full professor. If Van Dishoeck wanted to stay at Leiden for her graduate work, she needed to find another field of study. At that time, Van Dishoeck’s boyfriend and future husband, Tim de Zeeuw, studied astronomy and finished a course on discoveries of interstellar molecules. From de Zeeuw, she learned that the expert of the interstellar medium was Alex Dalgarno at Harvard University. While studying with Dalgarno in 1980, she switched her major to astrochemistry and completed her PhD on the excitation and breaking up of molecules within interstellar gas clouds. She then returned to Cambridge, MA, to receive a position in Harvard’s Society of Fellows to continue her outstanding research on the interstellar medium. She has been the scientific director of the Netherlands Research School for Astronomy (NOVA) since 2007.

== Research ==
Van Dishoeck works on interstellar molecules; physical and chemical evolution during star formation and planet formation; submillimeter and mid-infrared astronomy; basic molecular processes; and the radiative transfer of line and continuum radiation. In 2021 she was awarded an ERC Advanced Grant to study chemistry and physics in the planet-forming disks around stars other than the Sun.

She is the most cited molecular astrophysicist in the world.

== Impact ==
Ewine van Dishoeck’s work on astrochemistry was instrumental in answering how interstellar gas and dust can transform into living organisms. Life is dependent on carbon, and space has an abundance of this in the form of carbon monoxide. However, carbon monoxide could be broken up by ultraviolet (UV) radiation. Because of stars in the galaxy, UV light was abundant to break up the carbon monoxide. At her PhD studies, no one was aware of how some carbon monoxide molecules could remain alive in space. In her lab research, Van Dishoeck set up interstellar cloud models; she compared her tests against actual observations. She concluded that carbon monoxide is not vulnerable to all UV light through her trials. It is only susceptible to the wavelengths that it can absorb. As completed by her and John Black, dust and other molecules can block UV light, leading to carbon monoxide protection. Her findings answered why some carbon monoxide molecules were able to survive long enough to contribute to living organisms.

== Awards ==
Van Dishoeck was a Junior Fellow of the Harvard Society of Fellows in 1984, where she worked with Alex Dalgarno. She was awarded the Gold Medal of the Royal Netherlands Chemical Society in 1994, the Spinoza Prize (Netherlands) in 2000, and the Bourke Award of the Royal Society of Chemistry (UK) in 2001. Since 2001, she is a Member of the Royal Netherlands Academy of Arts and Sciences as well of the United States National Academy of Sciences. In 2013, she became a member of the Academy of Sciences Leopoldina. She received the Gothenburg Lise Meitner Award (Sweden) in 2014, and the Albert Einstein World Award of Science (Mexico) in 2015. In 2018, Van Dishoeck was awarded the James Craig Watson Medal (US) and the Kavli Prize (Norway) for astrophysics. In the same year, she also has been elected an Honorary Member of the Royal Netherlands Chemical Society. She was elected to the American Philosophical Society and was awarded the Prix Jules Janssen, both in 2020. In 2021 Pope Francis appointed her to the Pontifical Academy of Sciences and she was also awarded the Nick Kylafis Lectureship. In 2022 Van Dishoeck was awarded the Fritz Zwicky Prize for Astrophysics and Cosmology and the Niels Bohr International Gold Medal.

== Personal life ==
Van Dishoeck is married to Tim de Zeeuw, a professor of astronomy at Leiden University who was Director General of the European Southern Observatory from September 2007 to 2017.
