= Bruno Rossi Prize =

Prize awarded annually by the American Astronomical Society

The Bruno Rossi Prize is awarded annually by the High Energy Astrophysics division of the American Astronomical Society "for a significant contribution to High Energy Astrophysics, with particular emphasis on recent, original work". Named after astrophysicist Bruno Rossi, the prize is awarded with a certificate and a gift of US$1,500, and was first awarded in 1985 to William R. Forman and Christine Jones Forman "for pioneering work in the study of X-ray emission from early type galaxies". It has been awarded 40 times. In 2010, the prize was awarded to William B. Atwood, Peter Michelson and the Fermi Gamma-ray Space Telescope team "for enabling, through the development of the Large Area Telescope, new insights into neutron stars, supernova remnants, cosmic rays, binary systems, active galactic nuclei, and gamma-ray bursts". In 2013, the prize was awarded to Roger W. Romani of Leland Stanford Junior University and Alice Harding of Goddard Space Flight Center for their work in developing the theoretical framework underpinning the many exciting pulsar results from Fermi Gamma-ray Space Telescope.

== List of winners ==
- 1985 William R. Forman and Christine Jones Forman
- 1986 Allan S. Jacobson
- 1987 Michiel van der Klis
- 1988 Rashid A. Sunyaev
- 1989 IMB and Kamioka experiment teams
- 1990 Stirling Colgate
- 1991 John A. Simpson
- 1992 Gerald H. Share
- 1993 Giovanni Bignami and Jules Halpern
- 1994 Gerald J. Fishman
- 1995 Carl Fichtel
- 1996 Felix Mirabel and Luis F. Rodríguez
- 1997 Trevor C. Weekes
- 1998 The BeppoSAX team and Jan van Paradijs
- 1999 Jean Swank and Hale Bradt
- 2000 Peter Meszaros, Bohdan Paczyński, and Martin Rees
- 2001 Andrew Fabian and Yasuo Tanaka
- 2002 Leon Van Speybroeck
- 2003 Robert Duncan, Christopher Thompson, and Chryssa Kouveliotou
- 2004 Harvey Tananbaum and Martin C. Weisskopf
- 2005 Stan Woosley
- 2006 Deepto Chakrabarty, Tod Strohmayer, and Rudy Wijnands
- 2007 Neil Gehrels and the Swift team
- 2008 Steve Allen, Pat Henry, Maxim Markevitch, and Alexey Vikhlinin
- 2009 Charles D. Bailyn, Jeffrey E. McClintock, and Ronald A. Remillard
- 2010 Felix A. Aharonian, Werner Hofmann, Heinrich J. Voelk and the H.E.S.S. team
- 2011 William B. Atwood, Peter Michelson and the Fermi Gamma-ray Space Telescope LAT team
- 2012 Marco Tavani and the AGILE Team
- 2013 Roger W. Romani and Alice Harding
- 2014 Douglas P. Finkbeiner, Tracy R. Slatyer and Meng Su for their discovery of the Fermi Bubbles.
- 2015 Fiona A. Harrison
- 2016 Niel Brandt
- 2017 Gabriela González and the LIGO team
- 2018 Colleen Wilson-Hodge and the Fermi Gamma-ray Space Telescope GBM team
- 2019 Brian Metzger and Daniel Kasen
- 2020 Sheperd Doeleman and The Event Horizon Telescope Collaboration
- 2021 Francis Halzen and the IceCube collaboration
- 2022 Keith Gendreau, Zaven Arzoumanian and the team of the NICER
- 2023 Anatoly Spitkovsky
- 2024 Martin Weisskopf, Paolo Soffitta, and the IXPE team
- 2025 Maura Ann McLaughlin, Xavier Siemens, and NANOGrav
- 2026 Henric Krawczynski

== See also ==
- List of astronomy awards
