= Péter Mészáros =

American astrophysicist

Péter István Mészáros
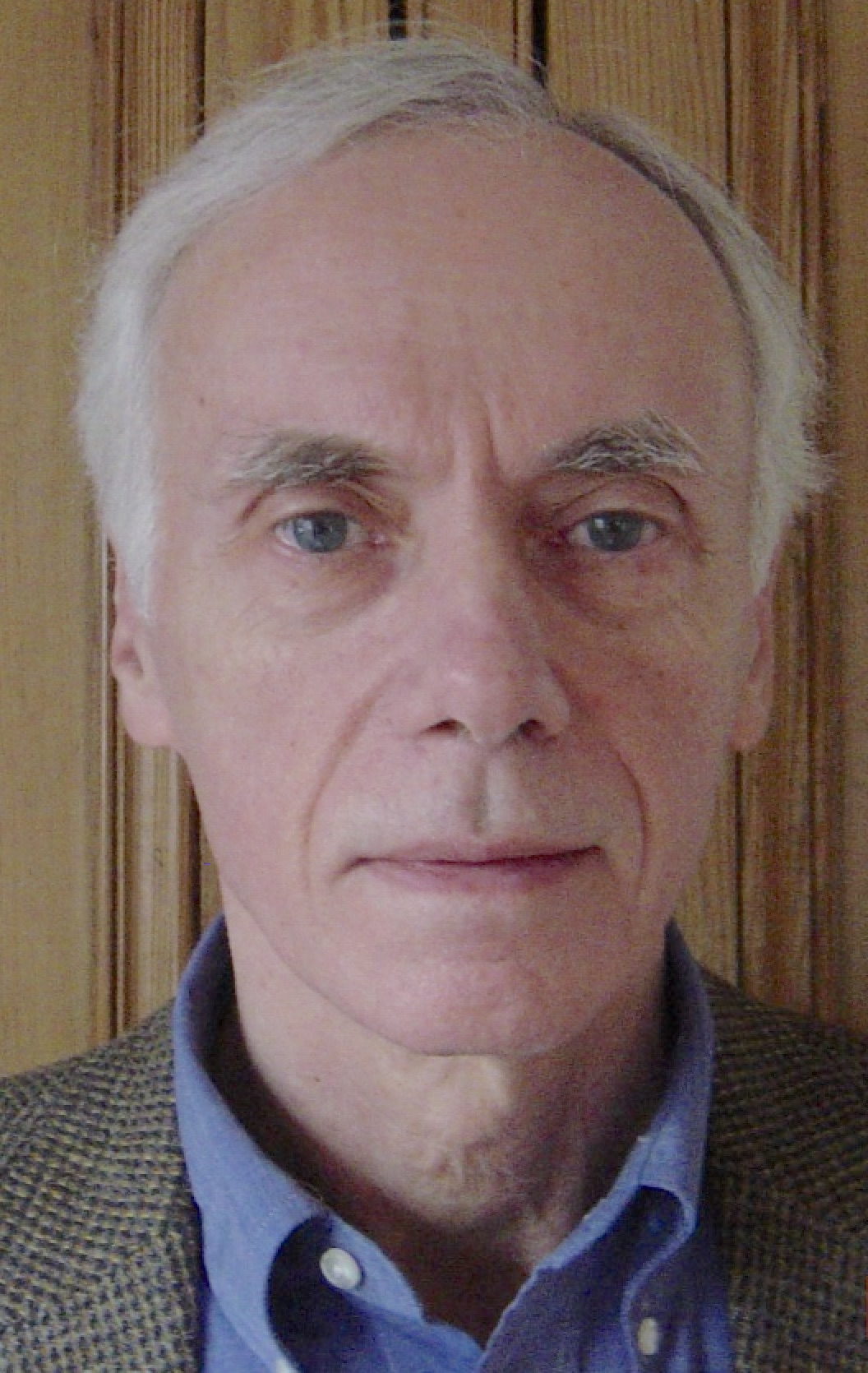
- Born: July 15, 1943; Budapest, Hungary
- Citizenship: Hungary,Argentina ,United States
- Education: University of Buenos Aires; University of California, Berkeley; Princeton University; Cambridge University
- Known for: Gamma ray bursts, Mészáros effect
- Awards: Einstein Professorship, Chinese Academy of Sciences; Bruno Rossi Prize; First Prize, Gravity Research Foundation
- Scientific career
- Fields: Astrophysics
- Workplaces: Pennsylvania State University
- Doctoral advisor: George B. Field

Péter István Mészáros (born 15 July 1943) is a Hungarian-Argentine theoretical astrophysicist, best known for the Mészáros effect in cosmology and for his work on gamma-ray bursts.

== Life ==
Péter Mészáros was born in 1943 in Budapest, Hungary, and grew up in Liège, Belgium and Buenos Aires, Argentina, where he did his undergraduate studies. He received his PhD in 1972 from the University of California, Berkeley, and after postdoctoral fellowships at Princeton University and Cambridge University he became a staff scientist at the Max Planck Institute for Astrophysics. He joined the Pennsylvania State University in 1983, where for ten years he was Head of the department of Astronomy and Astrophysics and Professor of Physics, being named Eberly Chair Professor.

== Career ==
Mészáros is widely known in the astrophysical community for his papers on the relativistic fireball shock model of gamma ray bursts and their afterglows, laying down the framework for the interplay between the jet dynamics and the external as well as internal shocks which determine the observational aspects of these sources. He is also known in the cosmological community for the Mészáros effect, or Mészáros equation, which quantifies the influence of dark matter in the evolution of the initial perturbations leading to large scale structures in cosmology. He was active in the study of the interstellar medium as well as the astrophysics of black holes, and contributed broadly to the study of magnetized neutron stars, e.g. He served as the science-theory lead of the NASA Neil Gehrels Swift Observatory space mission. His current interests include calculations of theoretical models of cosmic high energy cosmic ray and neutrino sources, e.g., as well as exploring various aspects of multimessenger astrophysics.

== Positions ==
Mészáros is a Member of the US National Academy of Sciences (2021), Fellow of the American Academy of Arts and Sciences (2010), Member of the Hungarian Academy of Sciences (2010), Fellow of the American Physical Society (1996) and Fellow of the American Astronomical Society (2019). He is the Eberly Chair Professor Emeritus of Astronomy and Astrophysics and of Physics at Penn State, and Director Emeritus of its Center for Multimessenger Astrophysics. He is currently a member of the Space Studies Board of the National Academy of Sciences.

== Awards ==
- 2020 - Legacy Fellow, American Astronomical Society in 2020.
- 2013 – Einstein Professorship of the Chinese Academy of Sciences
- 2009 – Thomson Reuters scienceWATCH: Highest ranked in citations on gamma-ray bursts during 1999–2009
- 2007 – Bruno Rossi Prize (shared with Neil Gehrels and the Swift team)
- 2000 – Bruno Rossi Prize (shared with B. Paczynski and M.J. Rees)
- 1999 – Fellow, John Simon Guggenheim Foundation
- 1996 - Fellow, American Physical Society
- 1976 – First Prize, Gravity Research Foundation (shared with P. Kafka)

== Personal life ==
Mészáros is married to Deborah Mészáros, and they have an adult son, Andor Mészáros.
