= Descartes Prize =

European Union award in science

The Descartes Prize was an annual award in for outstanding scientific and technological achievements resulting from collaborative research in Europe, given between 2000 and 2007 by the European Union. The prize was named in honour of the French mathematician and philosopher, René Descartes. The Descartes Prize was discontinued in 2007, when the EU funding framework FP7 (Seventh Framework Programme) led to a reorganisation and creation of new funding schemes such as the European Research Council (ERC) grants.

The Descartes Prize was awarded to teams of researchers who had "achieved outstanding scientific or technological results through collaborative research in any field of science, including the economic, social science and humanities." Nominations were submitted by the research teams themselves or by suitable national bodies.

A science communication prize was also started in 2004 as part of the Descartes Prize but in 2007 was separated to the Science Communication Prize.

Proposals (also referred to as submissions) received were judged and a shortlist of nominees were announced, from which five Laureates (finalists) and five Winners were announced at a prize ceremony in December each year.

== Laureates ==
Where a project coordinator was named, only that person was included here and none of the team members who are also "winners" or "laureates". (Full project members are included on the Descartes Prize website individual award pages.) Where no project "coordinator" was named, the team members are individually named.

- 2000 Winners: "Chemistry close to the absolute zero" (Ian Smith project coordinator); "The XPD gene: one gene, two functions, three diseases" (Alan Lehmann, project coordinator); "Plastic transistors operating at 50 kHz for low-end high-volume electronic circuits" (Dago de Leeuw, project coordinator)
- 2001 Winners: "Development of novel drugs against human immunodeficiency virus (HIV)" (Jan Balzarini, project coordinator); "Development of new asymmetric catalysts for chemical manufacturing" (Michael North, project coordinator)
- 2002 Winners: "Towards new drugs for Multiple Sclerosis patients" (Lars Fugger, Rikard Holmdahl, Yvonne Jones); "The universe's biggest explosions since the Big Bang" (Ed van den Heuvel, project coordinator)
- 2003 Winners: "Pinpoint positioning in a wobbly world" (Veronique Dehant, project coordinator); "Paving the way for roll-up screens and switch-on wallpaper" (Richard Friend, project coordinator)
- 2004 Winners: "Project MBAD" (Howard Trevor Jacobs, project coordinator); "Project IST-QuComm", Anders Karlsson)
- 2005 Winners: the EXEL (DALHM) team for "Extending electromagnetism through novel artificial methods" (Costas Soukoulis, Eleftherios Economou, Ekmel Ozbay, John Brian Pendry, Martin Wegener, David R. Smith, project members); the CECA (="Climate and environmental change in the Arctic") team for "breakthrough findings on climate and environmental change in the Arctic" (Ola M. Johannessen, Lennart Bengtsson, Leonid Bobylev, project members); the PULSE team for "demonstrating the impact of European pulsar science on modern physics" (Andrew Lyne, Nicolo D'amico, Axel Jessner, Ben Stappers, John Seiradakis, Marta Burgay); the ESS (European Social Survey) project, for "radical innovations in cross-national surveys; and the EURO-PID project for cutting-edge research on a group of over 130 rare genetically determined diseases known as primary immunodeficiencies".
- 2007 Winners:
  - ""H.E.S.S. project": High Energy Stereoscopic System of telescopes for very-high-energy gamma-ray cosmic source detection" (Werner Hofmann, Michael Punch, Paula Chadwick, Thomas Lohse, Philippe Goret, Goetz Heinzelmann, Stefan Wagner, Helene Sol, Reinhard Schlickeiser, Luke O'Connor Drury, Ladislav Rob, Ocker Cornelis de Jager, Christian Stegmann, Andrea Santangelo, Michael Ostrowski, Rudak Bronislaw, Ashot Akhperjanian)
  - "SynNanoMotors – The realisation of some of the world's first working synthetic molecular motors and mechanical nanomachines" (David Leigh, project coordinator, François Kajzar, Fabio Biscarini, Francesco Zerbetto, Wybren Jan Buma and Petra Rudolf)
  - "EPICA – European Project for Ice Coring in Antarctica" (Hubertus Fischer, Jean-Louis Tison, Thomas Stocker, Dorthe Dahl-Jensen, Valerie Masson-Delmotte, Massimo Frezzotti, Gérard Jugle, Valter Maggi, Michiel van den Broeke, Elisabeth Isaksson, Margareta Hansson, Eric Wolff)
