= Alice Harding =

American astrophysicist

Alice K. Harding
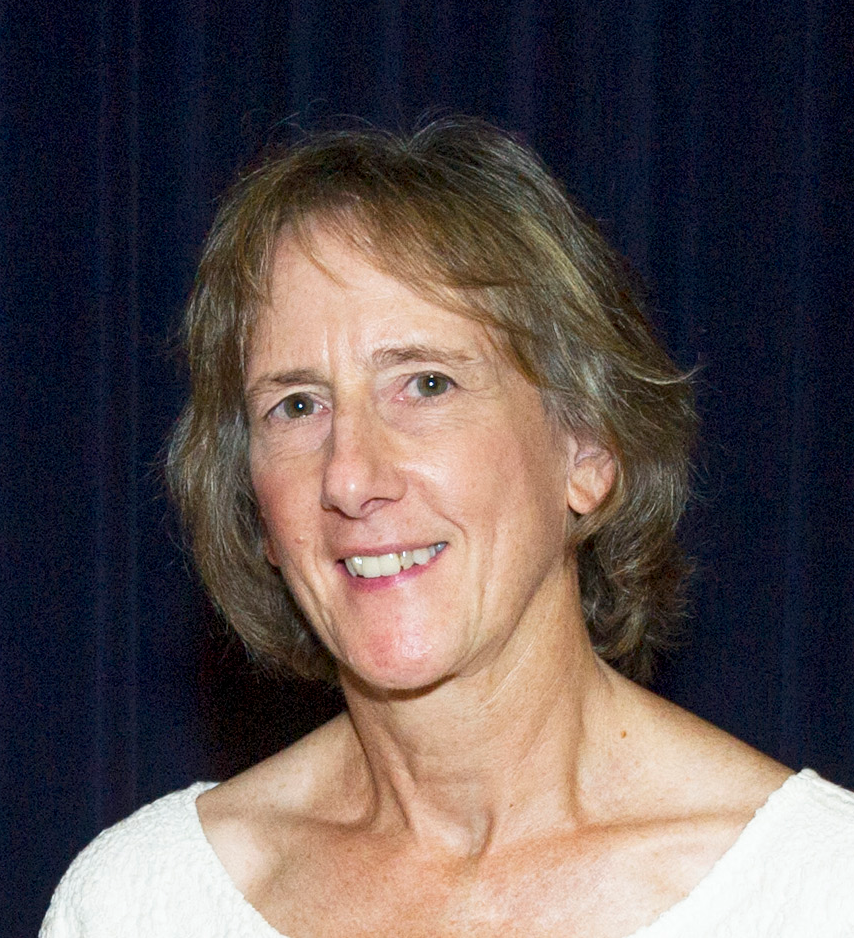
- Harding in 2012
- Education: Bryn Mawr College (BA), University of Massachusetts-Amherst (PhD)
- Awards: Bruno Rossi Prize 2013
- Scientific career
- Fields: Astrophysics
- Workplaces: NASA Goddard Space Flight Center
- Thesis: Propagation in Pulsar Magnetospheres: Effects of A Shearing Plasma (1979)

Alice Kust Harding is an American astrophysicist at the NASA Goddard Space Flight Center, Greenbelt, Maryland.

== Early life and education ==
Harding earned a B.A. from Bryn Mawr College, Pennsylvania, in 1973, and a Ph.D. from the University of Massachusetts-Amherst, in 1979. It was there that Alice met David Scott Harding, and they got married on Long Island in 1977. Alice K Harding researches the theory of high energy particle acceleration and radiation process in pulsars, highly magnetized neutron stars, gamma ray bursts and supernova remnants.

== Career and research ==
In 1980, Harding was appointed as astrophysicist in the Astrophysics Science Division at Goddard Space Flight Center, a post she has held since then. Her main research interests consist of high-energy particle acceleration and radiation processes in pulsars, highly magnetized neutron stars (magnetars), gamma-ray bursts, and supernova remnants.

Harding works as part of astrophysics collaborations including the NICER Science Team, the Fermi Collaboration and AMEGO. Part of her research involves the use of NASA's Fermi Gamma-ray Space Telescope. In 2007, Harding and her colleagues predicted that Fermi would find a dozens of millisecond Pulsars as gamma-ray sources. Additionally she is a member of the American Physical Society as well as a Legacy member of the American Astronomical Society.

In the 2020s, Harding has been a part of various research projects concerning Pulsars and their plasmas in conjunction with her job at the NASA Goddard Space Flight Center. Her physics commentary about the ability of photons in Pulsars to produce pairs capable of radiating more photons, hence being responsible for the density of Pulsars, was also recently published in APS Physics. She currently works at Los Alamos National Laboratory as a Visiting Scientist in the Theoretical Division.

== Awards and honours ==
Harding was awarded the status of Fellow in the American Physical Society, after being nominated by their Division of Astrophysics in 1991, for pioneering investigation of the theory of pulsar atmospheres, including the pulsar wind and its role in accelerating particles to high energies, and for contributions to the theory of basic electromagnetic interactions in the presence of super-strong magnetic fields.

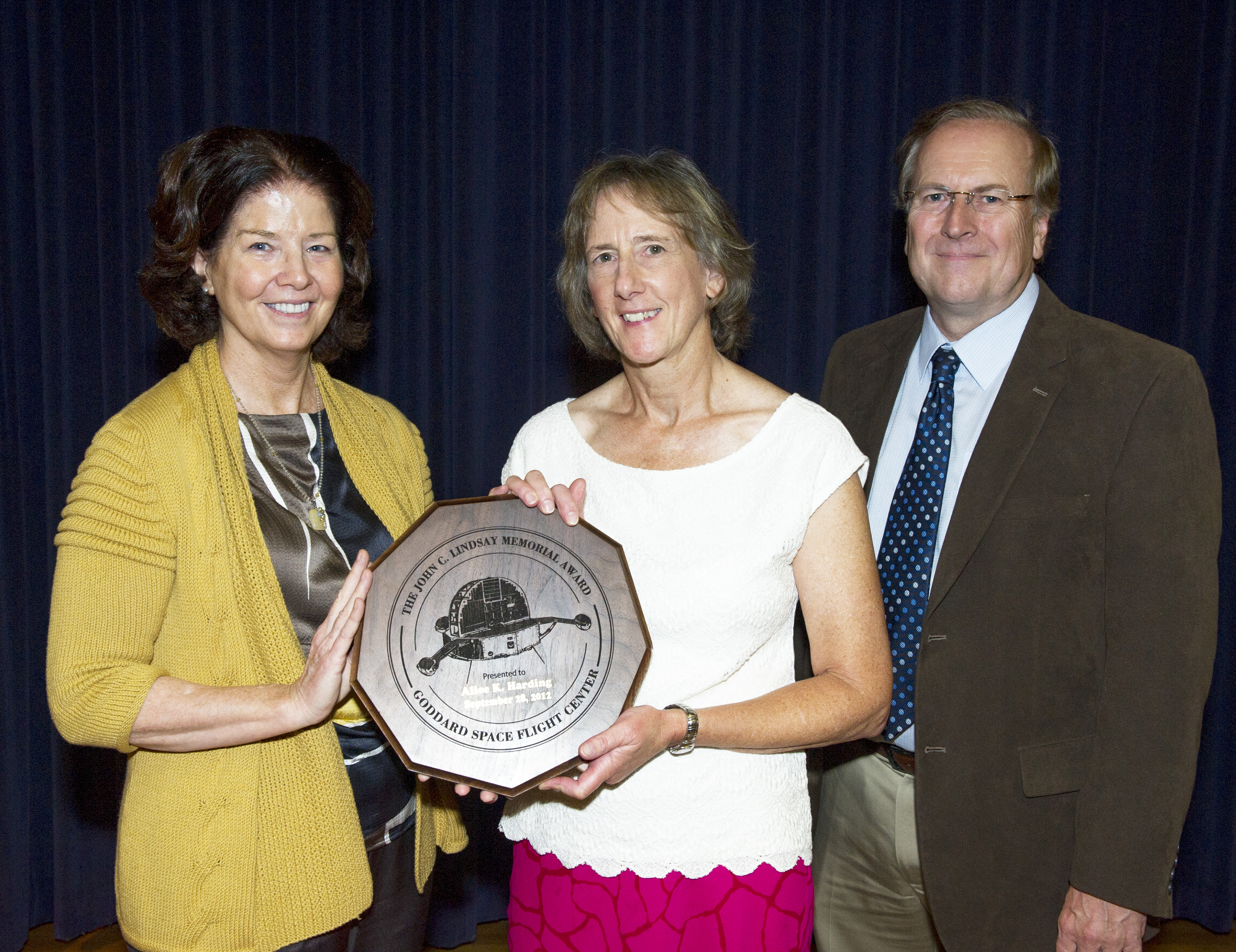
2012 John C. Lindsay Memorial Award is presented to Dr. Alice Harding. The award is presented by Deputy Director Dr. Colleen Hartman and Dr. Nicholas White.

In 1994, Harding received a NASA Exceptional Scientific Achievement Medal in 1994. In 2012, she was awarded the John C. Lindsay Memorial Award in recognition of her scientific achievements at Goddard.

Harding was awarded the 2013 Bruno Rossi Prize together with Roger W. Romani for establishing a theoretical framework for understanding gamma-ray pulsars. She was elected a Legacy Fellow of the American Astronomical Society in 2020.

Based on a research made in 2026, Harding published in average 13.6 papers a year from the year 1978 to 2025.
