= Fritz Zwicky Prize for Astrophysics and Cosmology =

- Awarded for: Obtaining fundamental and outstanding results related to the fields of astrophysics and/or cosmology
- Presented by: European Astronomical Society
- Reward: CHF 5000 (2020)
- First award: 2020
- Website: eas.unige.ch/zwicky_prize.jsp

The Fritz Zwicky Prize for Astrophysics and Cosmology is awarded biennially to a living person who, in the estimation of the judges, "has obtained fundamental and outstanding results related to astrophysics and/or cosmology". These results may constitute a body of work over a period of time or may be a single specific result. The Prize was established in 2020 and is awarded by the European Astronomical Society (EAS) on behalf of the Fritz Zwicky Foundation, located in Glarus, Switzerland.

Recipients are invited to deliver a plenary lecture at the following EAS Annual Meeting.

== Recipients ==
Year	Recipient		Citation	Ref(s)
2020	Martin Rees portrait facing the camera	Martin Rees	For outstanding contributions to astrophysics and cosmology including seminal papers on active galaxies and black holes, the origin of gamma-ray bursts, the large-scale structure of the Universe, and the cosmic microwave background. This exceptionally broad oeuvre has been both prescient and enormously influential.	
2022	Ewine van Dishoeck three-quarter body portrait facing the camera	Ewine van Dishoeck	For her groundbreaking, decades-spanning, work in observational astrochemistry and molecular spectroscopy, revealing the secrets of molecules from interstellar clouds to star and planet formation, and for her leadership within the astronomical community.	
2024	Catherine Cesarsky quarter body portrait facing the camera	Catherine Cesarsky	For outstanding contributions to the understanding of the evolution of galaxies via space infrared observations and for her leadership in shaping the observational infrastructure of contemporary astronomy.	

== See also ==
- List of astronomy awards
