= Leon Van Speybroeck =

American astronomer

Leon P. Van Speybroeck (Wichita (Kansas), August 27, 1935 - Newton, Massachusetts, December 25, 2002) was an American astronomer who served as Telescope Scientist for the Chandra X-Ray Observatory, which was launched into space aboard the Space Shuttle Columbia in 1998. Van Speybroek designed the mirrors that made possible its spectacular X-ray images of nearby and remote magical objects, including comets, exploding stars, jets of gas spewing from nearby black holes, and powerful quasars more than 10 billion light years from Earth. The data from Chandra prompted new discoveries about the evolution of galaxies, the nature of the black holes, dark matter, and the dimensions of the universe.

== Contributions to Chandra X-Ray Observatory ==
The Chandra mirrors designed by Van Speybroeck are the smoothest and most precise ever made, with tolerances measured within just a few atoms. The telescope's angular resolution, at 0.5 arcsecond, is ten times better than its predecessor and equivalent to being able to read newspaper text from half a mile away. The x-ray mirror assembly, with its four pairs of cylinders coated with highly reflective iridium, lies at Chandra's core. The mirrors deflect x-rays at very shallow angles, like skipping pebbles across a pond; in order to make an image, each x-ray is reflected twice – once from each member of a pair of cylinders. Four pairs of cylinders are nested inside one another to increase the size of the telescope, in order to collect more x-rays. Pending further identification, the first images received by the telescope were dubbed "Leon X-1" as a tribute to the quality of the mirrors.

The Chandra x-ray mirrors resulted from over two decades of collaboration between Van Speybroeck and colleagues at the Smithsonian Astrophysical Observatory and scientists and engineers affiliated with NASA's Marshall Space Flight Center, TRW Inc., Hughes-Danbury (now BF Goodrich Aerospace), Optical Coating Laboratories, Inc. and Eastman-Kodak. The Columbia Space Shuttle, piloted by Commander Eileen Collins, launched Chandra during STS-93 in July, 1999. It remains the heaviest payload ever handled by the shuttle program.

== Contributions to Early X-Ray Astronomy ==
After completing his PhD in nuclear physics at MIT, Van Speybroeck joined a team at American Science and Engineering headed by eventual Nobel Prize in Physics laureate Riccardo Giacconi on the first X-ray telescopes, built as part of Skylab (launched in 1970), the first US space station, and Uhuru (launched in 1973), the first x-ray astronomy space observatory. The team ultimately designed the mirrors for the Einstein Observatory, Chandra's predecessor, which launched in 1978 and represented a several hundredfold improvement in resolution. Van Speybroeck also played a role in developing the Corrective Optics Space Telescope Axial Replacement; COSTAR was used to correct the spherical aberrations on the original Hubble Space Telescope mirrors.

In recognition of his contributions to x-ray optics, Van Speybroeck was elected a Fellow of the American Physical Society in 1989 for "continued contributions to the development of x-ray optics and other instruments for x-ray astronomy, and for pioneering studies of the x-ray emissions from normal galaxies" He was also awarded the 2002 Bruno Rossi Prize of the High Energy Astrophysics Division of the American Astronomical Society.

Leon Van Speybroeck died unexpectedly December 25, 2002 at age 67. At the time of his death, Van Speybroeck was generally acknowledged as the world's premier designer of x-ray telescopes. The "Six Years of Science with Chandra, Dedicated to Leon Van Speybroeck" Symposium was held in Cambridge, Mass., November 2–4, 2005. Topics of X-ray astronomy included: Supernova Remnants, X-ray Optics, Young Stars and the Chandra Orion Ultra-Deep Project, Comets, AGNs, Clusters and Feedback, Galaxies, Jets and Their Environments, Dark Matter, Ultraluminous X-ray Sources, and X-ray Binary Populations.

Van Speybroeck intended to use his Chandra observation time, in part, to independently verify the Hubble Constant, which is key to understanding the universe's size, shape and age. Colleagues completed the work successfully and published their findings in August, 2006 edition of The Astrophysical Journal.

== Publications ==
- Exploring the universe: A Festschrift in Honor of Riccardo Giacconi, edited by H Gursky (Naval Research Laboratory, USA), R. Ruffini (University of Roma La Sapienza, Italy) & L. Stella (Osservatorio Astronomico di Roma, Italy) Italy October 1997 World Scientific 2000 ISBN 981-02-4423-1
- Revealing the universe: the making of the Chandra X-ray Observatory, Wallace Tucker and Karen Tucker Cambridge, MA: Harvard University Press, 2001, ISBN 0-674-00497-3
- The restless universe: Understanding X-Ray Astronomy in the Age of Chandra and Newton, Eric M. Schlegel, Oxford University Press, 2002 ISBN 0-19-514847-9
- The violent universe: Joyrides Through the X-ray Cosmos, Kimberly Weaver, The Johns Hopkins University Press, 2005. ISBN 0-8018-8115-3
