= Rudy Wijnands =

Dutch astrophysicist

- Born: 1971
- Education: University of Amsterdam (PhD)
- Awards: Bruno Rossi Prize (2006)
- Scientific career
- Fields: Astrophysics
- Workplaces: University of Amsterdam; University of St Andrews; MIT
- Doctoral advisor: Michiel van der Klis

Rudy Wijnands (born 1971) is a Dutch astrophysicist. He is professor of Observational High-Energy Astrophysics at the University of Amsterdam.

== Academic career ==
Since 2004 Wijnands has been part of the faculty with the Anton Pannekoek Institute for Astronomy at the University of Amsterdam in the Netherlands. In 2008 he was appointed associate professor, and in 2017 full professor. Before that, he worked at the University of St Andrews in Scotland, and MIT in the United States. He received his PhD from the University of Amsterdam in 1999 with a thesis entitled "Millisecond phenomena in X-ray binaries".

== Research ==
His research focuses on the accretion of matter onto neutron stars and black holes, which are very compact stellar remnants. He uses X-ray space telescopes such as Chandra X-ray Observatory and XMM-Newton to observe the X-ray emission from these objects. In particular he studies neutron stars and black holes when they are accreting at very low rates. He also investigates the rate at which neutron stars cool after they have been heated by accretion, in order to learn about their interior composition. Furthermore, Wijnands has been involved in research into quasi-periodic oscillations.

In 1998, Wijnands and his PhD advisor Michiel van der Klis discovered coherent millisecond X-ray pulsations in the persistent flux of the X-ray binary SAX J1808.4-3658. This was strong evidence for the model in which radio millisecond pulsars are spun up to periods of a few milliseconds by the accretion of matter from a companion star in an X-ray binary.

== Awards ==
In 2006 Wijnands received the Bruno Rossi Prize along with Deepto Chakrabarty and Tod Strohmayer "for their pioneering research which revealed millisecond spin periods and established the powerful diagnostic tool of kilohertz intensity oscillations in accreting neutron star binary systems".
