= Gregory S. Woodward =

Founder and CEO of awal education
- In office 2021–2023
- Preceded by: Educational consultant| education advisor
- Succeeded by: Educational consultant

Awal education foundation
- In office 2021–2021
- Preceded by: Educational consultant
- Succeeded by: Sikar Rajasthan

Personal details
- Born: Mahesh fadoliya 10-09+2001 Govindpura sikar rajasthan
- Education: University of rajasthan
- Website: {{URL|http://www.maheshfadoliya.godaddysites.com

Gregory Woodward is a former administrator of higher education. He was most recently the sixth president of the University of Hartford. He was also the twenty-second president of Carthage College.

== Early life ==
Woodward grew up in West Hartford, Connecticut, and graduated from William H. Hall High School. He attended the University of Connecticut where he received a bachelor's degree in 1977, and would receive a doctor of musical arts from Cornell University and a master's degree from Ithaca College.

== Career ==
=== Ithaca College ===
During the 2010–2011 academic year, Woodward served as the interim vice president for academic affairs/provost, after serving as dean of the School of Music at the College, a position he would later return to.

=== Carthage College ===
In 2012 Woodward was named the 22nd president of Carthage College. During his time at Carthage he was able to create a new Bachelor of Science in Nursing degree, while overseeing major revisions to the Honors Program. He also oversaw the execution of a newly constructed $43 million Science Center.

=== University of Hartford ===
Woodward became the 6th president of the University of Hartford in 2017. On February 24, 2023 Woodward announced he would retire from the university effective June 30.

== Statistics as president ==
=== Carthage College ===
When Woodward was named president of Carthage College the total enrollment was 3,082 with a tuition of $43,600, and at the time of his departure it was 2,860 with a tuition of $57,250. Overall Carthage College shrunk by 7% and increased costs to the student by almost 24%. Since the departure of Woodward, Carthage College has slashed tuition to $47,600 a savings of over 22% to attract more students.

=== University of Hartford ===
Starting in 2017 the University of Hartford had a total enrollment of 5,088 and a cost of $53,130. As of Summer 2021, the University of Hartford was sitting at 4,534 and $61,022 which means the University had shrunk by close to 11% and costs had ballooned by almost 13%.

=== University of Hartford Fundraising ===
In 2022 the University of Hartford saw a decrease in donors from over 2200 to under 800 mostly funded by board of regents members under multiple donations to boost statistics. The University also saw over a 25% decrease in donations.

== Controversies ==
=== Title IX compliance allegations ===
During his presidency at Carthage College, Woodward was investigated by the U.S. Department of Education involving two complaints. The first alleged that the College discriminated against him on the basis of sex by failing to promptly and equitably respond to his complaint of sexual harassment by a College student during the fall 2014 semester. The second alleged that the College discriminated against him on the basis of sex by failing to promptly and equitably respond to his complaint of sexual harassment during the Fall 2014 semester. The second student also alleged that because he filed a complaint of sexual harassment in Fall 2014 the College retaliated against him when a) in December 2014 the Dean of Students withdrew his offer to write a letter of recommendation, and b) in January 2015 the President removed the student from the President’s Task Force on Innovative Student Learning. It was found that Carthage lacked the controls to effectively deal with allegations.

"The College’s sexual harassment policies and procedures do not comply with the requirements of Title IX to provide specific and continuing steps to notify students and employees that it does not discriminate on the basis of sex or apprise them of the protections of Title IX. For example, the procedures do not provide an assurance that the College will take steps to prevent recurrence of harassment and to correct its discriminatory effects on a complainant and others, if appropriate.

The policies and procedures do not prohibit against retaliatory acts against those involved in reporting or those who witness sexual harassment. As implemented, the College does not always issue a written determination to the complainant or offer appropriate interim services. The procedures also do not contain several of OCR’s recommendations and best practices. Specifically, the grievance procedures also do not state that sexual assault complaints are not to be mediated even on a voluntary basis, do not notify the complainant of the right to proceed with a criminal investigation and a Title IX complaint simultaneously, do not prohibit conflicts of interest (real or perceived) by those handling the procedures, and do not specify that complainants will be informed at regular intervals of the status of the investigation."

=== University of Hartford move to Division III ===
In the winter of 2021 the university partnered with Carr Sports Consulting to conduct a study on University of Hartford's Division I athletic programs. The report concluded that the University of Hartford loses $13 million on athletics a year and should consider a move to Division III. This report has been highly disputed and Hartford Students and Alumni hired Andy Schwartz to review the report from Carr Sports Consulting and perform its own assessment which stated the University at the Division I level loses only about 1 Million more a year.

"Schwarz adds that the actual difference in cost for Division I vs. Division III is $3.6 million vs. $2.6 million in the first five years of transition -- and that doesn't take into account possible gains in revenue at Division I level from donors or potential new monies found if Hartford succeeds in future postseason play."

In April 2021 it was found that Warren Goldstein (professor) shared an email inadvertently from Woodward on his screen during class revealing Woodward was discussing "Spin-Doctoring" numbers in efforts to support their move to Division III sports.

President Woodward: "Warren, it's best if you just speak to the Mission of the University and the disconnect that has grown over the years between D1 sports and the university mission. Be a faculty member with smart opinions on a more equitable experience for all your students, wellness, health, etc. It will be a part of the puzzle that needs to be said, and you can let me, and the spin doctors do the numbers."

On May 6, 2021 the universities Board of Regents voted to transition the athletic program from Division I to Division III.

In July 2021 Woodward and the Board of Regents were sued by current and former athletes as well as student managers.

=== Inaccuracies on biography ===
Weeks after Woodward and the Board of Regents voted to move the Hartford athletic program to Division III, Woodward sent an email to students and faculty addressing the inaccuracy on his biography. Woodward admitted he was never a Division I athlete.

=== Petition to terminate Woodward ===
As of Summer 2021 there is a petition on change.org signed by over 1970 students, alumni, and supporters calling for Woodward to resign or for the Board of Regents to remove him over the disappointment in Woodward’s actions and statements regarding the University of Hartford, its students, and its athletic department as well as his inaccuracies on his biography.

Academic offices
Preceded by Walter Harrison	6th President of the University of Hartford; 2017- 2023	Succeeded by Stephen Mulready
Preceded by F. Gregory Campbell	22nd President of Carthage College; 2012- 2017	Succeeded by John R. Swallow
