= Jan van Paradijs =

Dutch high-energy astrophysicist

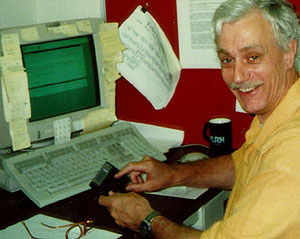
- Jan van Paradijs in 1993
- Born: 9 June 1946; Haarlem, Netherlands
- Died: 2 November 1999 (aged 53); Amsterdam, Netherlands
- Education: University of Amsterdam
- Spouse: Chryssa Kouveliotou (m. 1992)
- Awards: Bruno Rossi Prize (1998)
- Scientific career
- Fields: Astrophysics
- Workplaces: University of Amsterdam; University of Alabama in Huntsville; Massachusetts Institute of Technology

Johannes A. van Paradijs (9 June 1946 – 2 November 1999) was a Dutch high-energy astrophysicist. He is best known for discovering the first optical afterglow of a gamma-ray burst, GRB 970228, in February 1997, together with two of his students, and for establishing that gamma-ray bursts are extragalactic events. He was married to the astrophysicist Chryssa Kouveliotou.

== Research ==
Van Paradijs determined the first mass of a neutron star, the X-ray pulsar Vela X-1 in 1975. In 1978 he showed that X-ray bursters are neutron stars in binary systems. Using spectroscopic mapping, he was the first to spatially resolve an accretion disk.

== Academic career ==
Van Paradijs obtained his PhD at the University of Amsterdam, Netherlands, in 1975, working on cool giant stars. His thesis was entitled "Studies of line spectra of G- and K-type stars" and his supervisor was David Koelbloed. Afterwards he started working on X-ray binaries. In 1988 he was appointed full professor at the University of Amsterdam, and later he worked part-time at the University of Alabama in Huntsville, U.S. He published over 400 scientific papers, including many with long-time collaborator Walter Lewin of MIT.

The minor planet 9259 Janvanparadijs was named after him.
