= Bursting Pulsar =

Star in the constellation Sagittarius

Observation data Epoch J2000 Equinox ICRS
- Constellation: Sagittarius
- Right ascension: 17^{h} 44^{m} 33.1^{s}
- Declination: −28° 44′ 29″

Details
Rotation	2.141 second^{−1}

Other designations
- 2EG J1746-2852, 3EG J1746-2851, INTREF 820, AX J1744.5-2844

Database references
SIMBAD	data

The Bursting Pulsar (GRO J1744-28) is a low-mass x-ray binary with a period of 11.8 days. It was discovered in December 1995 by the Burst and Transient Source Experiment on the Compton Gamma-Ray Observatory, the second of the NASA Great Observatories. The pulsar is unique in that it has a "bursting phase" where it emits gamma rays and X-rays peaking at approximately 20 bursts per hour after which the frequency of bursts drops off and the pulsar enters a quiescent phase. After a few months, the bursts reappear, though not yet with predictable regularity.

The Bursting Pulsar is the only known X-ray pulsar that is also a Type II X-ray burster.
