= Stefan Wagner (professor) =

German management scientist

- Born: Germany
- Occupations: Academic, management researcher

Academic background
- Education: LMU Munich

Academic work
- Institutions: European School of Management and Technology
- Main interests: Technological change and economics of innovation

Stefan Wagner is a German management researcher focusing on technological change and the economics of innovation and new technology. He is a professor at European School of Management and Technology, where he also serves as Director of PhD Studies.

== Career ==
Stefan Wagner got his doctorate (Dr. oec. publ.) and his habilitation at LMU Munich. Afterwards, he became a professor at the European School of Management and Technology (ESMT Berlin). He has been a founding member and also the president (2018/2019) of EPIP European Policy for Intellectual Property Association, where he currently serves on the board. Stefan also is a board member of the Berlin School of Economics.

His scholarly work has been published in a wide range of top academic journals in management and economics such as the Academy of Management Journal, Management Science, Strategic Management Journal or The Review of Economics and Statistics. In addition to his scholarly work, Stefan frequently serves as a keynote speaker and has delivered a TEDx talk on how institutional uncertainty affects R&D investments in 2021.

== Books ==
- Fischl, B. and S. Wagner (2016). Der perfekte Businessplan: So überzeugen Sie Banken und Investoren. 3rd Edition. Beck München.
- Wagner, S. (2007). Economic Analyses of the European Patent System. DUV Gabler.

== Recognition ==
- Fulbright Scholarship (2001/2002)
- TUSIAD – TCCI Chair: European Economic Integration (2014–2016)
- Recipient of Jürgen-Hauschildt-Award of the Technology, Innovation and Entrepreneurship section of the VHB - German Academic Association for Business Research for the best research publication in innovation management, 2018.
