= Peter Michelson =

American physicist

Peter F. Michelson is an American physicist who focuses on high energy astrophysics, particularly X-ray and gamma-ray observations and instrument development. He is currently the Luke Blossom Professor in the School of Humanities and Sciences at Stanford University.

Michelson is the Principal Investigator of the Fermi Gamma-ray Space Telescope's main instrument, the Large Area Telescope (LAT) and spokesman for the LAT collaboration.
