= Vibjörn Karlén =

Swedish geologist (1937–2021)

Vibjörn (Wibjörn) Karlén
- Born: 26 August 1937; Kristine, Kopparberg County, Sweden
- Died: 22 October 2021 (aged 84)
- Education: Stockholm University
- Scientific career
- Fields: Natural geography, Quaternary geology, Paleoclimatology
- Workplaces: Stockholm University

Vibjörn (Wibjörn) Karlén (born 26 August 1937 in Kristine, Kopparberg County, Sweden; died 22 October 2021) was a Swedish geologist who was professor emeritus of physical geography and quaternary geology at Stockholm University.

In an article which describes Karlén as a paleoclimatologist, he is quoted as saying: "One of the big problems with trying to determine long-term temperature changes, is that weather records only go back to about 1860. By relying on statistical reconstruction of the last 1000 years, using only the temperature patterns of the last 140 years instead of actual temperature readings, the IPCC report and Summary missed both a major cooling period as well as a significant warming trend during that millennium." Karlén has also criticized the mainstream media for "spreading the exaggerated views of a human impact on climate." He was also named in a 2007 minority report of the U.S. Senate Environment and Public Works Committee as one of 400 "prominent scientists" who were said to dispute global warming. In 2010, he predicted that natural climate changes, caused to a large degree by the sun's activity, would more likely make the climate colder than warmer in the next decades.

He was a contributing author to the Fraser Institute 2007 Independent Summary for Policymakers.

Karlén was a member of the Royal Swedish Academy of Sciences and editor-in-chief of the journal Geografiska Annaler Series A, Physical Geography from 2004 to 2010.
