= Robert C. Duncan (astrophysicist) =

American astrophysicist (born 1955)

- Born: September 2, 1955 (age 71); Pensacola, Florida, U.S.

Academic background
- Education: Dartmouth College (AB); Cambridge University (CPGS); Cornell University (PhD)

Academic work
- Discipline: Astrophysics
- Institutions: Princeton University; University of Texas at Austin

Robert C. Duncan (Jr.) (born September 2, 1955) is an American astrophysicist now retired from the University of Texas at Austin.

Duncan was born in Pensacola, Florida, in 1955. He grew up in Houston and Boston, where his father played a key role in NASA's Apollo Project. Duncan (Jr.) later earned a Bachelor of Arts degree in physics from Dartmouth College in 1977 and a PhD in physics from Cornell University in 1986. He also studied at the University of Cambridge. As a student, Duncan was a competitive runner and marathoner.

From 1986 to 1988, Duncan worked as a postdoctoral researcher at Princeton University. With Christopher Thompson, he proposed and developed the theory of magnetars, and was awarded the Bruno Rossi Prize for this work in 2003. Duncan has written scientific research papers about neutron stars, supernovae, intergalactic gas clouds, neutrino emissions of very dense matter and related topics.
