= Christopher Thompson (astronomer) =

Canadian astronomer and astrophysicist

Arthur Christopher Thompson
- Born: 1961 (age 64–65)
- Education: Princeton University
- Known for: Astrophysicist
- Awards: Bruno Rossi Prize (2003)
- Scientific career
- Doctoral advisor: Jeremiah P. Ostriker

Christopher Thompson (born 1961) is a Canadian astronomer and astrophysicist. He is a professor of astronomy at the University of Toronto Canadian Institute for Theoretical Astrophysics (CITA).

Thompson received his Ph.D. from Princeton University in 1988. His thesis discussed the cosmological effects of superconducting strings. His advisor was Jeremiah P. Ostriker.

He is a former faculty member of University of North Carolina at Chapel Hill.

In 1992, Thompson first proposed the existence of magnetars with Robert Duncan. They were awarded the Bruno Rossi Prize for their work in 2003.

In 2018, Thompson was inducted into the Royal Society of Canada Academy of Science, Division of Mathematical and Physical Sciences.
