= Netherlands Research School for Astronomy =

Graduate school in the Netherlands that specializes in Astronomy, founded in 1992

The Netherlands Research School for Astronomy (Dutch: Nederlandse Onderzoekschool voor Astronomie, also known as NOVA) is a graduate school specializing in astronomy, based in the Netherlands. This graduate school was founded in 1992.

== Formation and partners ==
NOVA was formed by a federated partnership of the following institutions:

- Anton Pannekoek Institute for Astronomy (of the University of Amsterdam),
- Kapteyn Institute (of the University of Groningen),
- the Leiden Observatory (of Leiden University), and
- Radboud University (in the city of Nijmegen).

The astronomical institute of Utrecht University was also part of NOVA until it closed in 2012.

Three of the top research institutions that NOVA collaborates with internationally are the Max Planck Society, Harvard University, and Center for Astrophysics | Harvard & Smithsonian (CfA).

== Goals, activities, and research areas ==
This graduate school has two main goals. The first goal is to conduct advanced astronomical research, and the second is to educate young astronomers at the highest international level.

=== Education ===
NOVA is involved in, among other things, distributing funds for hiring PhD students, as well as communicating astronomical research results to the press, the general public and primary and secondary education. NOVA also organizes the annual autumn school in which every astronomical PhD student participates at least once.

NOVA possesses three inflatable mobile planetariums that visit approximately 200 primary and secondary schools annually, reaching about 30,000 students per year. After an initial stop in activities during 2020 due to the COVID-19 pandemic in the Netherlands, NOVA resumed classroom visits with a high quality flat screen, pending resumption of the inflatable technique.

=== Support for research ===
Coordinating national scientific policy in the field of astronomy is among NOVA's tasks. NOVA also helps to fund telescope projects, for example the Africa Millimetre Telescope.

Astronomical research is divided by NOVA into three parts:

- Origin and evolution of galaxies: from the big bang to the present
- Formation and evolution of stars and planets
- Astrophysics of Neutron Stars and Black Holes

== Leaders, facilities, and discoveries ==
Since 2007, Ewine van Dishoeck has been scientific director of NOVA, and from 2017 Huub Röttgering has been chairman of the board.

NOVA astronomers rely heavily on the European Southern Observatory (ESO), most notably the Very Large Telescope (VLT) and the Atacama Large Millimeter Array (ALMA). A large fraction of the instrument projects that NOVA participates in are targeted at these facilities, as well as the future Extremely Large Telescope.

Among recent discoveries made by NOVA astronomers, one pertains to NGC 2005 which is a spherical globular cluster in the Large Magellanic Cloud (LMC). NOVA announced in 2021 proof that NGC 2005 is a relic from the merger of a smaller galaxy into the LMC, i.e. one galaxy got eaten by another.
