= Anton Pannekoek Institute for Astronomy =

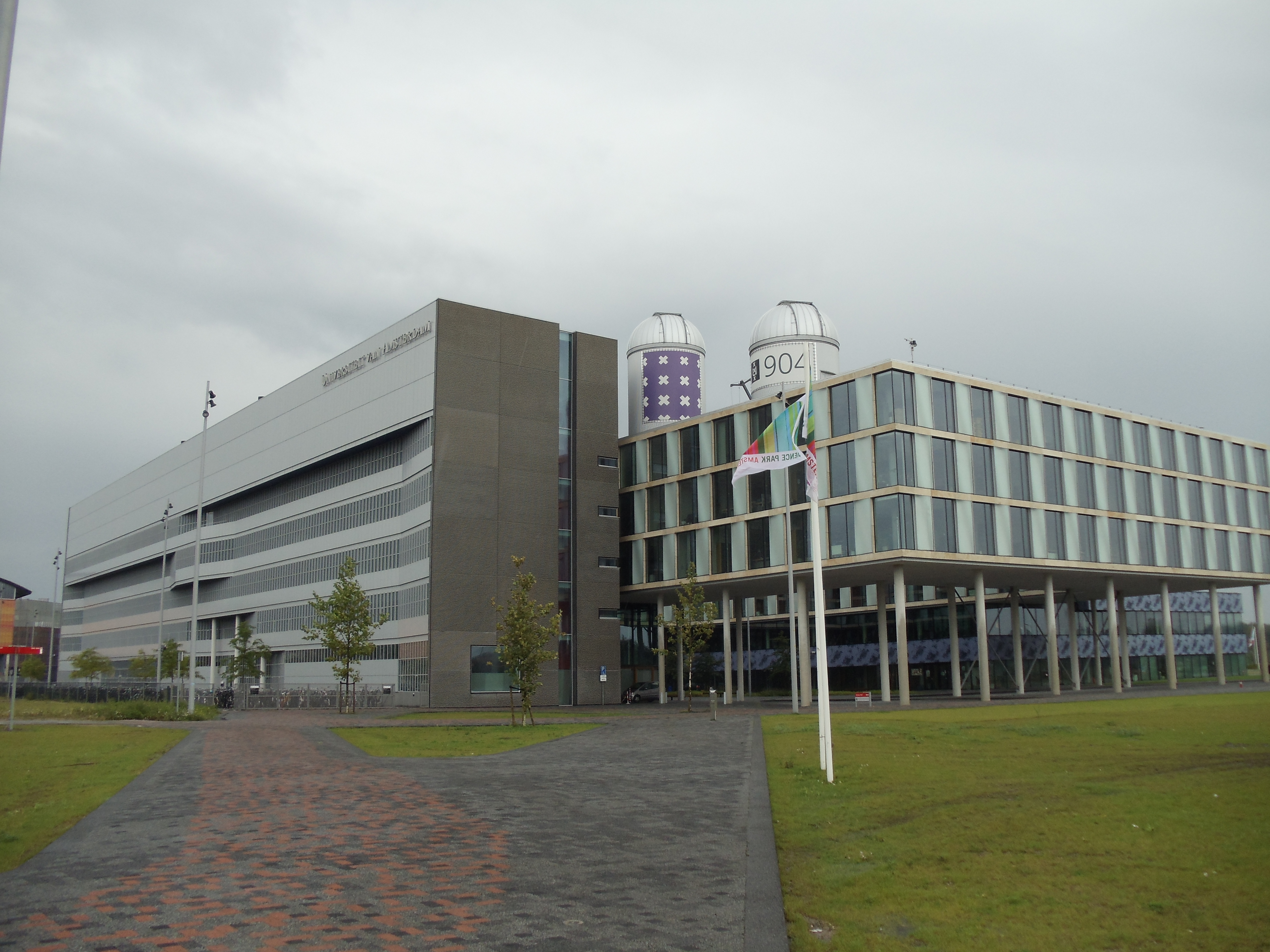
- Other name: Anton Pannekoek Instituut
- Parent institution: Faculty of Science (FNWI)
- Established: 1921
- Head: Carsten Dominik
- Owner: University of Amsterdam
- Location: Amsterdam, Netherlands
- Website: api.uva.nl

Anton Pannekoek Institute for Astronomy is one of the research institutes of the Faculty of Science of the University of Amsterdam. It is named after the Dutch astronomer and Marxist Anton Pannekoek.
