= 1806-20 =

1806-20 may refer to:

- a position in the sky, 18^{h} 06^{m} −20°
  - 1806-20 cluster, the star cluster containing SGR 1806-20
  - LBV 1806-20, a luminous blue variable star
  - SGR 1806-20, a soft gamma repeater pulsar
- A range of years from 1806 to 1820
