= Quake (natural phenomenon) =

Surface shaking on interstellar bodies in general

A quake is the result when the surface of a planet, moon or star begins to shake, usually as the consequence of a sudden release of energy transmitted as seismic waves, and potentially with great violence. The types of quakes include earthquake, moonquake, marsquake, venusquake, sunquake, starquake, and mercuryquake. They can also all be referred to generically as earthquakes.

== Earthquake ==
An earthquake is a phenomenon that results from the sudden release of stored energy in the Earth's crust that creates seismic waves. At the Earth's surface, earthquakes may manifest themselves by a shaking or displacement of the ground and sometimes cause tsunamis, which may lead to loss of life and destruction of property. An earthquake is caused by tectonic plates (sections of the Earth's crust) getting stuck and putting a strain on the ground. The strain becomes so great that rocks give way and fault lines occur.

== Moonquake ==
A moonquake is the lunar equivalent of an earthquake (i.e., a quake on the Moon) although moonquakes are caused in different ways. They were first discovered by the Apollo astronauts. The largest moonquakes are much weaker than the largest earthquakes, though their shaking can last for up to an hour, due to fewer attenuating factors to damp seismic vibrations.

Information about moonquakes comes from seismometers placed on the Moon from 1969 through 1972. The instruments placed by the Apollo 12, 14, 15 and 16 missions functioned perfectly until they were switched off in 1977.

There are at least four kinds of moonquake:

- Deep moonquakes (~700 km below the surface, probably tidal in origin)
- Meteorite impact vibrations
- Thermal moonquakes (the frigid lunar crust expands when sunlight returns after the two-week lunar night)
- Shallow moonquakes (50–220 kilometers below the surface)

The first three kinds of moonquakes mentioned above tend to be mild; however, shallow moonquakes can register up to m_{B}=5.5 on the body-wave magnitude scale. Between 1972 and 1977, 28 shallow moonquakes were observed. Deep moonquakes tend to occur within isolated kilometer-scale patches, sometimes referred to as nests or clusters.

== Marsquake ==
A marsquake is a quake that occurs on the planet Mars. A 2012 study suggests that marsquakes may occur every million years. This suggestion is related to evidence found then of Mars's tectonic boundaries. NASA's InSight lander, which was active between early 2019 and late 2022, recorded over 1,300 individual seismic events. Of these, many were marsquakes resembled terrestrial earthquakes, and several events were confirmed to be meteorite impacts.

== Venusquake ==
A venusquake is a quake that occurs on the planet Venus.

A venusquake may have caused a new scarp and a landslide to form. An image of the landslides was taken in November 1990 during the first flight around Venus by the Magellan spacecraft. Another image was taken on July 23, 1991 as the Magellan revolved around Venus for the second time. Each image was 24 kilometres (15 mi) across and 38 kilometres (24 mi) long, and was centered at 2° south latitude and 74° east longitude. The pair of Magellan images shows a region in Aphrodite Terra, within a steeply sloping valley that is cut by many fractures (faults).

== Sunquake ==
A sunquake is a quake that occurs on the Sun.

Seismic waves produced by sunquakes occur in the photosphere and can travel at velocities of 35,000 kilometres per hour (22,000 mph) for distances up to 400,000 kilometres (250,000 mi) before fading away.

On July 9, 1996, a sunquake was produced by an X2.6 class solar flare and its corresponding coronal mass ejection. According to researchers who reported the event in Nature, this sunquake was comparable to an earthquake of a magnitude 11.3 on the Richter scale. That represents a release of energy approximately 40,000 times greater than that of the devastating 1906 San Francisco earthquake, and far greater than that of any earthquake ever recorded. Such an event contains the energy of 100–110 billion tons of TNT or 2 million modest sized nuclear bombs. It is unclear how such a relatively modest flare could have liberated sufficient energy to generate such powerful seismic waves.

The ESA and NASA spacecraft SOHO records sunquakes as part of its mission to study the Sun.

== Starquake ==
A starquake is an astrophysical phenomenon that occurs when the crust of a neutron star undergoes a sudden adjustment, analogous to an earthquake on Earth. Starquakes are thought to result from two different mechanisms. One is the huge stresses exerted on the surface of the neutron star produced by twists in the ultra-strong interior magnetic fields. A second cause is a result of spindown. As the neutron star loses linear velocity due to frame-dragging and by the bleeding off of energy due to it being a rotating magnetic dipole, the crust develops an enormous amount of stress. Once that exceeds a certain level, it adjusts itself to a shape closer to non-rotating equilibrium: a perfect sphere. The actual change is believed to be on the order of micrometers or less, and occurs in less than a millionth of a second.

The largest recorded starquake was detected on December 27, 2004 from the ultracompact stellar corpse SGR 1806-20. The quake, which occurred 50,000 light years from Earth, released gamma rays equivalent to 10^{37} kW. Had it occurred within a distance of 10 light years from Earth, the quake could have triggered a mass extinction.

== Mercuryquake ==
A mercuryquake is a quake that occurs on Mercury. In 2016 it has been suggested that quakes might happen on Mercury due to the planet's contraction as the interior cools, impact vibrations or from heat or possibly magma rising from the core and mantle. It has not been measured or proven yet due to the fact that no probes have landed on its surface.

== Ice quake ==
An ice quake, also known as a cryoseism or frost quake, is a non-tectonic seismic event typically caused by a sudden cracking action in water-saturated frozen soil or rock, or by stresses generated at frozen lakes. These events often occur when water drains into the ground and freezes, expanding and putting intense stress on its surroundings until it is relieved explosively in the form of tremors, ground cracking, and thundering sounds.

Within the glacial cryosphere, glacial cryoseisms arise from internal cracking, ocean calving, or basal processes where subglacial water reduces friction, allowing a glacier to suddenly shift. Vibrations can also be induced by ocean gravity waves and transoceanic infragravity waves that flex ice shelves across hundreds of kilometers, creating seismic signals detectable by broadband stations. While often localized, very large calving events in Greenland and Antarctica have been observed to generate significant seismic events with magnitudes of 5 or larger.

== Labquake ==
A labquake occurs when a normal stress and a driving shear force are applied across an interface between two solid blocks, generating stick-slip instabilities. This experimental configuration is utilized to simulate and analyze the foundational physical mechanisms of seismic slip events, such as natural earthquakes and icequakes, under highly controlled conditions

== See also ==
- Magnetar
- Neutron star
- Pulsar
- Soft gamma repeater
