= GRB 790305b =

1979 gamma-ray bursts event in the constellation Dorado

GRB 070714B
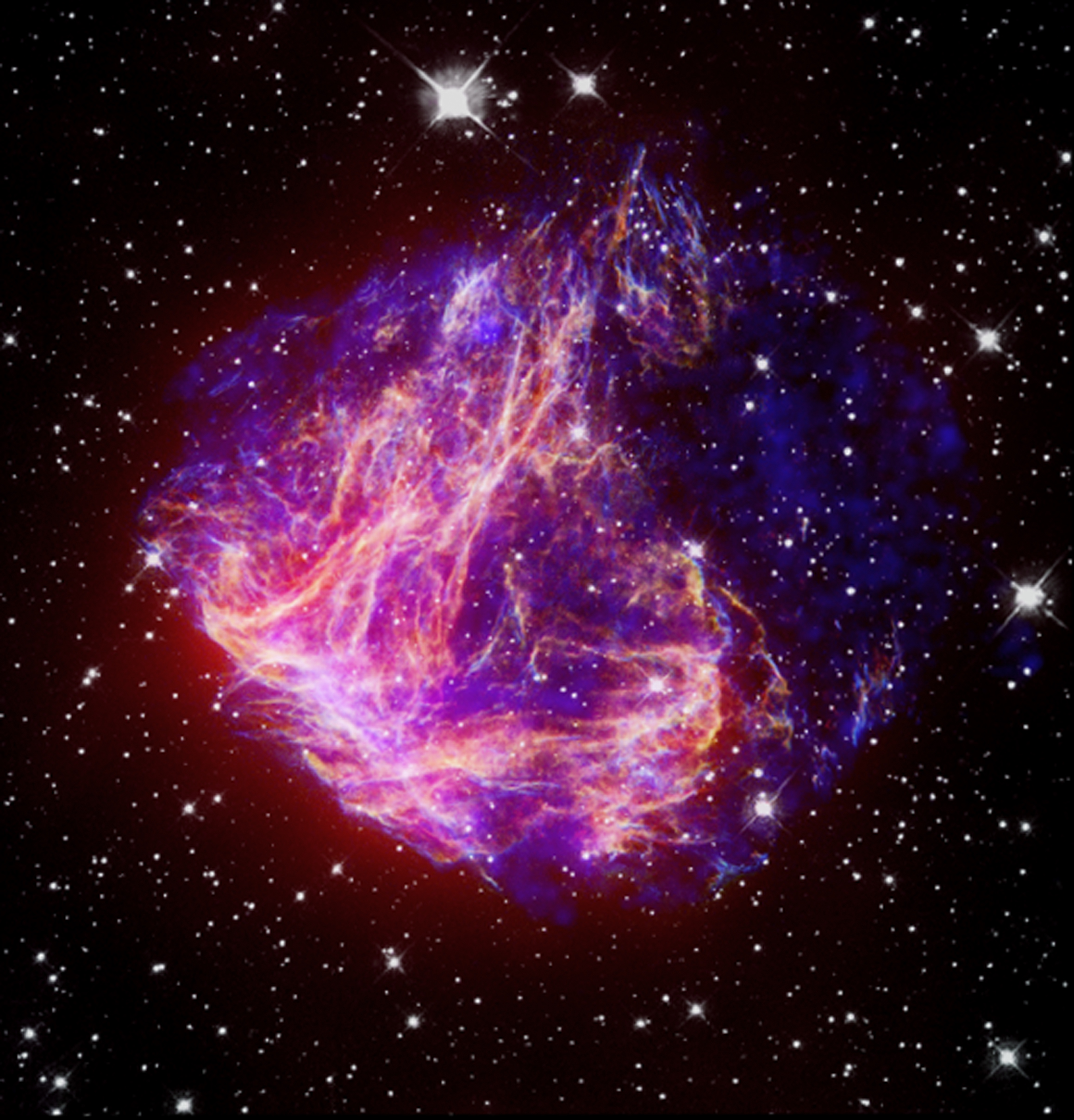
- Event type: Soft gamma repeater
- Date: c. 165,000 years ago (detected 5 March 1979)
- Instrument: Venera 11
- Constellation: Dorado
- Distance: c. 165,000 ly
- Host: Large Magellanic Cloud
- Progenitor: SGR 0526−66
- Progenitor type: Magnetar

GRB 790305b was a gamma-ray burst that was discovered on 5 March 1979. It was an extremely bright burst that was successfully localized to supernova remnant N49 in the Large Magellanic Cloud. This event is now interpreted as a magnetar giant flare, more related to soft gamma repeater (SGR) flares than "true" gamma-ray bursts. It is the first observed SGR megaflare, a specific type of short GRB. It has been associated with the magnetar SGR 0526-66.

== The event ==
On 5 March 1979, Soviet spacecraft Venera 11 and Venera 12, then in heliocentric orbit, were hit by a blast of gamma radiation at around 10:51 EST. This contact raised the radiation readings on both the probes from a normal 100 counts per second to over 200,000 counts a second in only a fraction of a millisecond.

11 seconds later, Helios 2, a NASA probe, also in helio-orbit, was saturated by the blast of radiation. It soon hit Venus, and the Pioneer Venus Orbiter's detectors were overcome by the wave. Seconds later, Earth received the wave of radiation, where the powerful output of gamma rays inundated the detectors of three U.S. Department of Defense Vela satellites, the Soviet Prognoz 7 satellite, and the Einstein Observatory. The Earth's ionosphere expanded. The blast was also detected by the International Sun-Earth Explorer in distant halo orbit.

This event was over 100 times more intense than any known previous extra-solar burst. Because gamma rays travel at the speed of light and the exact time of the detection pulse was recorded by several distant, widely dispersed spacecraft as well as on Earth, the source of the gamma radiation could be triangulated to within an accuracy of around 2 arcseconds. The direction of the source corresponded with SGR 0526-66, the remnant of a star in the Large Magellanic Cloud that had exploded as a supernova around 3000 BC.

== Sources ==
- Kouveliotou, Chryssa; Duncan, Robert C.; Thompson, Christopher (February 2003). "Magnetars" (PDF). Scientific American. Vol. 288, no. 2. pp. 35–41. Archived from the original (PDF) on 11 June 2007.
