= Gamma-ray burst progenitors =

Types of celestial objects that can emit gamma-ray bursts

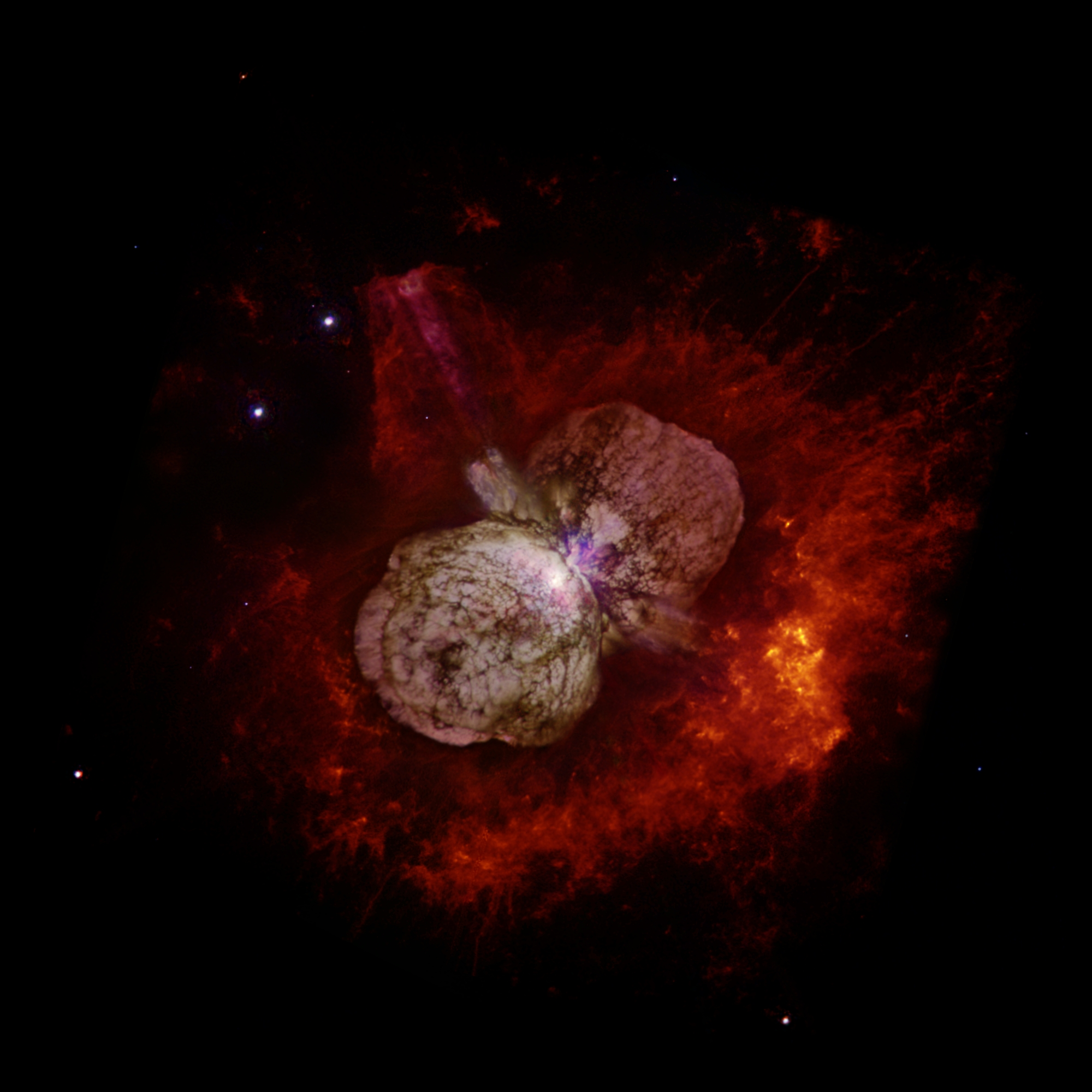
Eta Carinae, in the constellation of Carina, one of the nearer candidates for a hypernova

Gamma-ray burst progenitors are the types of celestial objects that can emit gamma-ray bursts (GRBs). GRBs show an extraordinary degree of diversity. They can last anywhere from a fraction of a second to many minutes. Bursts could have a single profile or oscillate wildly up and down in intensity, and their spectra are highly variable unlike other objects in space. The near complete lack of observational constraint led to a profusion of theories, including evaporating black holes, magnetic flares on white dwarfs, accretion of matter onto neutron stars, antimatter accretion, supernovae, hypernovae, and rapid extraction of rotational energy from supermassive black holes, among others.

There are at least two different types of progenitors (sources) of GRBs: one responsible for the long-duration, soft-spectrum bursts and one (or possibly more) responsible for short-duration, hard-spectrum bursts. The progenitors of long GRBs are believed to be massive, low-metallicity stars exploding due to the collapse of their cores. The progenitors of short GRBs are thought to arise from mergers of compact binary systems like neutron stars, which was confirmed by the GW170817 observation of a neutron star merger and a kilonova.

== Long GRBs: massive stars ==
=== Collapsar model ===
As of 2007, there is almost universal agreement in the astrophysics community that the long-duration bursts are associated with the deaths of massive stars in a specific kind of supernova-like event commonly referred to as a collapsar or hypernova. Very massive stars are able to fuse material in their centers all the way to iron, at which point a star cannot continue to generate energy by fusion and collapses, in this case, immediately forming a black hole. Matter from the star around the core rains down towards the center and (for rapidly rotating stars) swirls into a high-density accretion disk. The infall of this material into the black hole drives a pair of jets out along the rotational axis, where the matter density is much lower than in the accretion disk, towards the poles of the star at velocities approaching the speed of light, creating a relativistic shock wave at the front. If the star is not surrounded by a thick, diffuse hydrogen envelope, the jets' material can pummel all the way to the stellar surface. The leading shock actually accelerates as the density of the stellar matter it travels through decreases, and by the time it reaches the surface of the star it may be traveling with a Lorentz factor of 100 or higher (that is, a velocity of 0.9999 times the speed of light). Once it reaches the surface, the shock wave breaks out into space, with much of its energy released in the form of gamma-rays.

Three very special conditions are required for a star to evolve all the way to a gamma-ray burst under this theory: the star must be very massive (probably at least 40 Solar masses on the main sequence) to form a central black hole in the first place, the star must be rapidly rotating to develop an accretion torus capable of launching jets, and the star must have low metallicity in order to strip off its hydrogen envelope so the jets can reach the surface. As a result, gamma-ray bursts are far rarer than ordinary core-collapse supernovae, which only require that the star be massive enough to fuse all the way to iron.

=== Evidence for the collapsar view ===
This consensus is based largely on two lines of evidence. First, long gamma-ray bursts are found without exception in systems with abundant recent star formation, such as in irregular galaxies and in the arms of spiral galaxies. This is strong evidence of a link to massive stars, which evolve and die within a few tens or hundred million years and are never found in regions where star formation has long ceased. This does not necessarily prove the collapsar model (other models also predict an association with star formation) but does provide significant support.

Second, there are now several observed cases where a supernova has immediately followed a gamma-ray burst. While most GRBs occur too far away for current instruments to have any chance of detecting the relatively faint emission from a supernova at that distance, for lower-redshift systems there are several well-documented cases where a GRB was followed within a few days by the appearance of a supernova. These supernovae that have been successfully classified are type Ib/c, a rare class of supernova caused by core collapse. Type Ib and Ic supernovae lack hydrogen absorption lines, consistent with the theoretical prediction of stars that have lost their hydrogen envelope. The GRBs with the most obvious supernova signatures include GRB 060218 (SN 2006aj), GRB 030329 (SN 2003dh), and GRB 980425 (SN 1998bw), and a handful of more distant GRBs show supernova "bumps" in their afterglow light curves at late times.

Possible challenges to this theory emerged recently, with the discovery of two nearby long gamma-ray bursts that lacked the signature of any type of supernova: both GRB060614 and GRB 060505 defied predictions that a supernova would emerge despite intense scrutiny from ground-based telescopes. Both events were, however, associated with actively star-forming stellar populations. One possible explanation is that during the core collapse of a very massive star a black hole can form, which then 'swallows' the entire star before the supernova blast can reach the surface.

== Short GRBs: degenerate binary systems ==
Short gamma-ray bursts appear to be an exception. Until 2007, only a handful of these events have been localized to a definite galactic host. However, those that have been localized appear to show significant differences from the long-burst population. While at least one short burst has been found in the star-forming central region of a galaxy, several others have been associated with the outer regions and even the outer halo of large elliptical galaxies in which star formation has nearly ceased. All the hosts identified so far have also been at low redshift. Furthermore, despite the relatively nearby distances and detailed follow-up study for these events, no supernova has been associated with any short GRB.

=== Neutron star and neutron star/black hole mergers ===
While the astrophysical community has yet to settle on a single, universally favored model for the progenitors of short GRBs, the generally preferred model is the merger of two compact objects as a result of gravitational inspiral: two neutron stars, or a neutron star and a black hole. While thought to be rare in the Universe, a small number of cases of close neutron star - neutron star binaries are known in the Milky Way galaxy, and neutron star - black hole binaries are believed to exist as well. According to Einstein's theory of general relativity, systems of this nature will slowly lose energy due to gravitational radiation and the two degenerate objects will spiral closer and closer together, until in the last few moments, tidal forces rip the neutron star (or stars) apart and an immense amount of energy is liberated before the matter plunges into a single black hole. The whole process is believed to occur extremely quickly and be completely over within a few seconds, accounting for the short nature of these bursts. Unlike long-duration bursts, there is no conventional star to explode and therefore no supernova.

This model has been well-supported so far by the distribution of short GRB host galaxies, which have been observed in old galaxies with no star formation (for example, GRB050509B, the first short burst to be localized to a probable host) as well as in galaxies with star formation still occurring (such as GRB050709, the second), as even younger-looking galaxies can have significant populations of old stars. However, the picture is clouded somewhat by the observation of X-ray flaring in short GRBs out to very late times (up to many days), long after the merger should have been completed, and the failure to find nearby hosts of any sort for some short GRBs.

=== Magnetar giant flares ===
One final possible model that may describe a small subset of short GRBs are the so-called magnetar giant flares (also called megaflares or hyperflares). Early high-energy satellites discovered a small population of objects in the Galactic plane that frequently produced repeated bursts of soft gamma-rays and hard X-rays. Because these sources repeat and because the explosions have very soft (generally thermal) high-energy spectra, they were quickly realized to be a separate class of object from normal gamma-ray bursts and excluded from subsequent GRB studies. However, on rare occasions these objects, now believed to be extremely magnetized neutron stars and sometimes termed magnetars, are capable of producing extremely luminous outbursts. The most powerful such event observed to date, the giant flare of 27 December 2004, originated from the magnetar SGR 1806-20 and was bright enough to saturate the detectors of every gamma-ray satellite in orbit and significantly disrupted Earth's ionosphere. While still significantly less luminous than "normal" gamma-ray bursts (short or long), such an event would be detectable to current spacecraft from galaxies as far as the Virgo Cluster and, at this distance, would be difficult to distinguish from other types of short gamma-ray burst on the basis of the light curve alone. To date, three gamma-ray bursts have been associated with SGR flares in galaxies beyond the Milky Way: GRB 790305b in the Large Magellanic Cloud, GRB 051103 from M81 and GRB 070201 from M31.

== Diversity in the origin of long GRBs ==
HETE II and Swift observations reveal that long gamma-ray bursts come with and without supernovae, and with and without pronounced X-ray afterglows. It gives a clue to a diversity in the origin of long GRBs, possibly in- and outside of star-forming regions, with otherwise a common inner engine. The timescale of tens of seconds of long GRBs hereby appears to be intrinsic to their inner engine, for example, associated with a viscous or a dissipative process.

The most powerful stellar mass transient sources are the above-mentioned progenitors (collapsars and mergers of compact objects), all producing rotating black holes surrounded by debris in the form of an accretion disk or torus. A rotating black hole carries spin-energy in angular momentum as does a spinning top:

$$E_{spin} = \frac{1}{2} I \Omega_H^2$$

where $I=4M^3(\cos(\lambda/2)/\cos(\lambda/4))^2$ and $\Omega_H=(1/2M)\tan(\lambda/2)$ denote the moment of inertia and the angular velocity of the black hole in the trigonometric expression $\sin\lambda=a/M$ for the specific angular momentum $a$ of a Kerr black hole of mass $M$. With no small parameter present, it has been well-recognized that the spin energy of a Kerr black hole can reach a substantial fraction (29%) of its total mass-energy $M$, thus holding promise to power the most remarkable transient sources in the sky. Of particular interest are mechanisms for producing non-thermal radiation by the gravitational field of rotating black holes, in the process of spin-down against their surroundings in aforementioned scenarios.

By Mach's principle, spacetime is dragged along with mass-energy, with the distant stars on cosmological scales or with a black hole in close proximity. Thus, matter tends to spin-up around rotating black holes, for the same reason that pulsars spin down by shedding angular momentum in radiation to infinity. A major amount of spin-energy of rapidly spinning black holes can thereby be released in a process of viscous spin-down against an inner disk or torus—into various emission channels.

Spin-down of rapidly spinning stellar mass black holes in their lowest energy state takes tens of seconds against an inner disk, representing the remnant debris of the merger of two neutron stars, the break-up of a neutron star around a companion black hole or formed in core-collapse of a massive star. Forced turbulence in the inner disk stimulates the creation of magnetic fields and multipole mass-moments, thereby opening radiation channels in radio, neutrinos and, mostly, in gravitational waves with distinctive chirps shown in the diagram with the creation of astronomical amounts of Bekenstein-Hawking entropy.

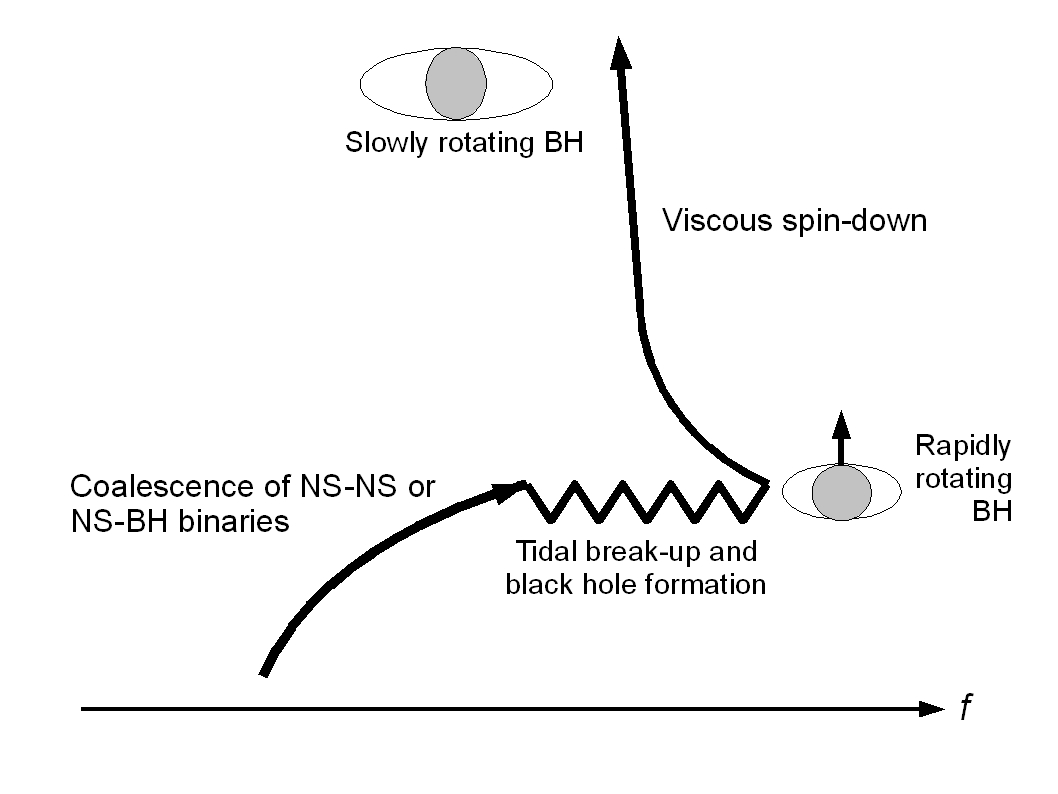
Diagram of van Putten (2009) showing the gravitational radiation produced in binary coalescence of neutron stars with another neutron star or black hole and, post-coalescence or following core-collapse of a massive star, the expected radiation by high-density turbulent matter around stellar mass Kerr black holes. As the ISCO (ellipse) relaxes to that around a slowly rotating, nearly Schwarzschild black hole, the late-time frequency of gravitational radiation provides accurate metrology of the black hole mass.

Transparency of matter to gravitational waves offers a new probe to the inner-most workings of supernovae and GRBs. The gravitational-wave observatories LIGO and Virgo are designed to probe stellar mass transients in a frequency range of tens to about fifteen hundred Hz. The above-mentioned gravitational-wave emissions fall well within the LIGO-Virgo bandwidth of sensitivity; for long GRBs powered by "naked inner engines" produced in the binary merger of a neutron star with another neutron star or companion black hole, the above-mentioned magnetic disk winds dissipate into long-duration radio-bursts, that may be observed by the novel Low Frequency Array (LOFAR).

== See also ==
- Gamma-ray burst emission mechanisms
- Quark-nova
