= Westerhout 31 =

Complex of star formation regions of the Milky Way

Emission nebula
- H II region
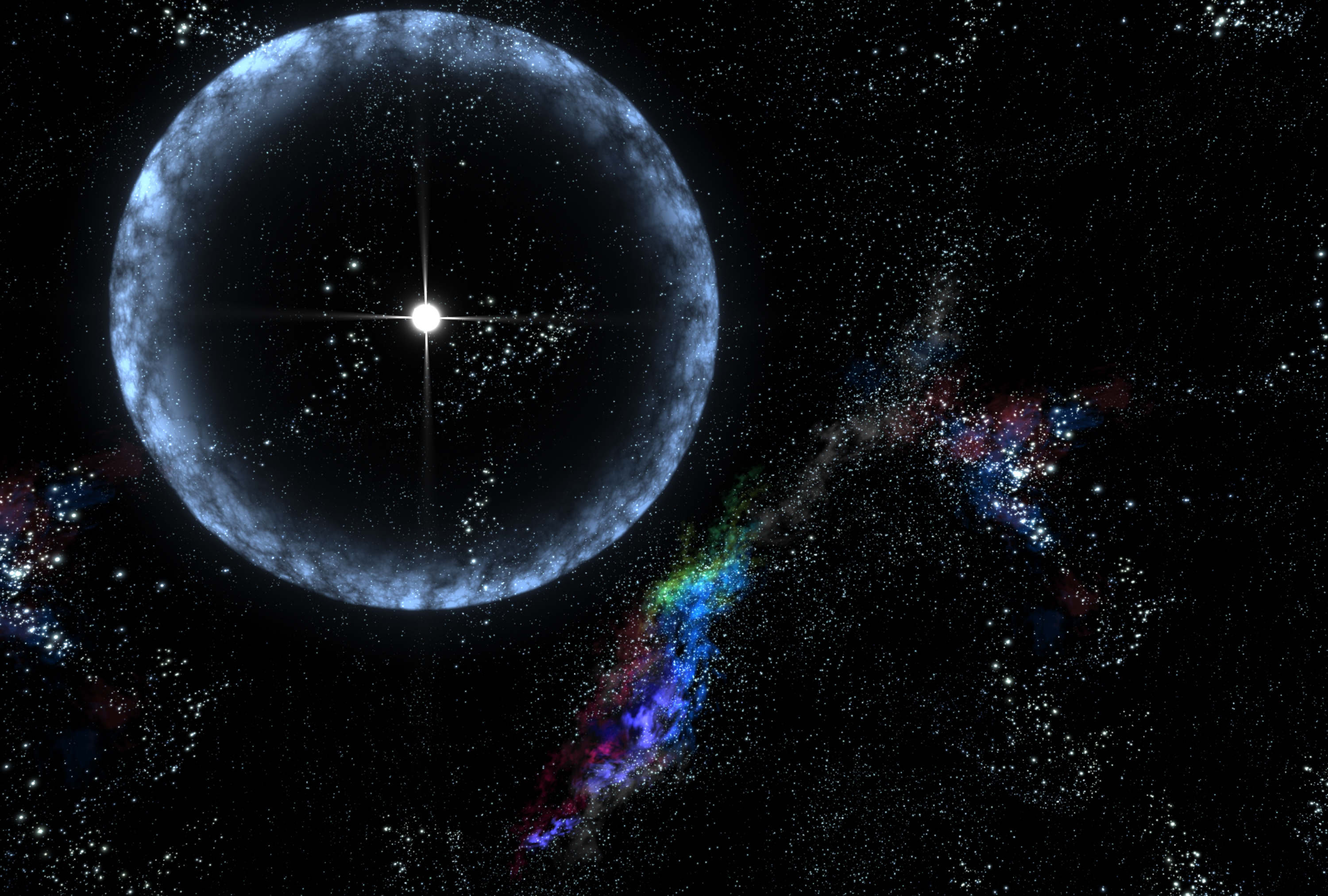
- Artist's impression of SGR 1806-20, a magnetar located in 1806-20 cluster

Observation data: J2000 epoch
- Right ascension: 18^{h} 10^{m} 28.6^{s}
- Declination: −19° 55′ 51″
- Distance: 11,000–15,000 ly (3,300–4,500 pc)
- Constellation: Sagittarius
- Notable features: massive H II region Star-forming regions
- Designations: GRS G010.47 +00.03

Westerhout 31, also known as W31, is a complex of star formation regions of the Milky Way located in the constellation of Sagittarius.

== Characteristics ==
As happens with other similar star-forming regions, Westerhout 31's location in the Milky Way obscures it so much due to the interstellar dust located between it and the Solar System that it cannot be studied with optical telescopes and for its observation infrared telescopes such as Spitzer, radiotelescopes, or instruments able to detect X-Rays and gamma rays are needed.

Westerhout 31 seems to be actually formed of several star-forming regions at very different distances that from our line of sight appear together: one (formed by the radio-emitting nebulae G10.2-0.3 and G10.6-0.4) at a distance of 3.3 or 4.5 kiloparsecs from the Sun and other (the radio-emitting nebula G10.3-0.1) much farther away, at a distance between 11.8 and 14.5 kiloparsecs (in the other side of the galaxy respect to the Sun, with the former distance more likely due to its stellar content).

G10.3-0.1 is the most notable as it contains the star cluster 1806-20 that includes the famous luminous blue variable star LBV 1806-20, the magnetar SGR 1806-20, two blue hypergiant stars, a supergiant O star, three Wolf-Rayet stars, two of them carbon-rich, and other young, massive stars.

The closest complex, formed by G10.2-0.3 and G10.6-0.4, includes a very young (0.6 Myr) star cluster with at least four O stars and five massive YSOs.

== See also ==
- 1806-20 cluster
