= N49 =

N49 may refer to:

- N49 (Long Island bus)
- Escadrille N.49, a unit of the French Air Force
- LMC N49, a supernova remnant the Large Magellanic Cloud
- HNoMS Brage (N49), a minesweeper of the Royal Norwegian Navy
