= SGR 0526−66 =

Star in the constellation Dorado

Observation data Epoch J2000.0 Equinox ICRS
- Constellation: Dorado
- Right ascension: 05^{h} 26^{m} 00.7^{s}
- Declination: −66° 04′ 35″
- Apparent magnitude (V): 24.0

Characteristics
- Spectral type: M

Astrometry
| Distance | 165,000 ly |

Other designations
- PSR B0526−66

Database references
| SIMBAD | data |

SGR 0526−66 (also known as PSR B0565−66) is a soft gamma repeater (SGR), located in the supernova remnant LMC N49, in the Large Magellanic Cloud. It was the first soft gamma repeater discovered, and as of 2015, the only known located outside our galaxy. First detected in March 1979, it was located by using the measurement of the arrival time differences of the signal by the set of artificial satellites equipped with gamma ray detectors. It is not certain that the explosion that gave birth to SGR 0525-66 is also the one that produced the remnant N49.

== Discovery ==
On March 5, 1979, two Soviet spacecraft that were then drifting through the Solar System were hit by a blast of gamma radiation at 15:51 UTC. This contact raised the radiation readings on both the probes from a normal 100 counts per second to over 200,000 counts a second, in only a fraction of a millisecond.

This burst of gamma rays quickly continued to spread. Eleven seconds later, Helios 2, a NASA probe, which was in orbit around the Sun, was saturated by the blast of radiation. It soon hit Venus, and the Pioneer Venus Orbiter's detectors were overcome by the wave. Seconds later, Earth received the wave of radiation, where the powerful output of gamma rays inundated the detectors of three U.S. Department of Defense Vela satellites, the Soviet Prognoz 7 satellite, and the Einstein Observatory. Just before the wave exited the Solar System, the blast also hit the International Sun–Earth Explorer. This extremely powerful blast of gamma radiation constituted the strongest wave of extra-solar gamma rays ever detected; it was over 100 times more intense than any known previous extra-solar burst. Because gamma rays travel at the speed of light and the time of the pulse was recorded by several distant spacecraft as well as on Earth, the source of the gamma radiation could be calculated to an accuracy of about 2 arcseconds. The direction of the source corresponded with the remnants of a star that had gone supernova around 3000 B.C.E. The event was named GRB 790305b, the first observed SGR megaflare.
