= Swift J1822.3−1606 =

Soft gamma repeater in the constellation Sagittarius

SWIFT J1822.3−1606
- Object type: Star

Observation data (Epoch J2000)
- Constellation: Sagittarius
- Right ascension: 18^{h} 22^{m} 18.32^{s}
- Declination: −16° 04′ 27.2″

SWIFT J1822.3−1606 is a soft gamma repeater discovered by the Swift observatory. It is believed to be a magnetar, albeit one with a relatively weak magnetic field of 3.4×10^{13} G, similar to that of SGR 0418+5729. As of January 2016, it was the magnetar with the second-weakest magnetic field yet found.

The magnetar is estimated at 1.6 kiloparsecs from Earth and has a bolometric luminosity of 2.5×10^{31}–2.6×10^{33} erg/s while in its quiescent state. It has a spin period of ~8.4 seconds, which is within the typical range for magnetars.
