= W31 (disambiguation) =

W31 is an American nuclear warhead.

W 31 or W31 may also refer to:

- Mercedes-Benz W31, a German off-road vehicle
- Nagayama Station (Hokkaido), station code W31
- SS W 31, a British dredger hopper barge
- Westerhout 31, an H II region in the Milky Way
