= SWIFT J1818.0−1607 =

Young magnetar in the Sagittarius Constellation

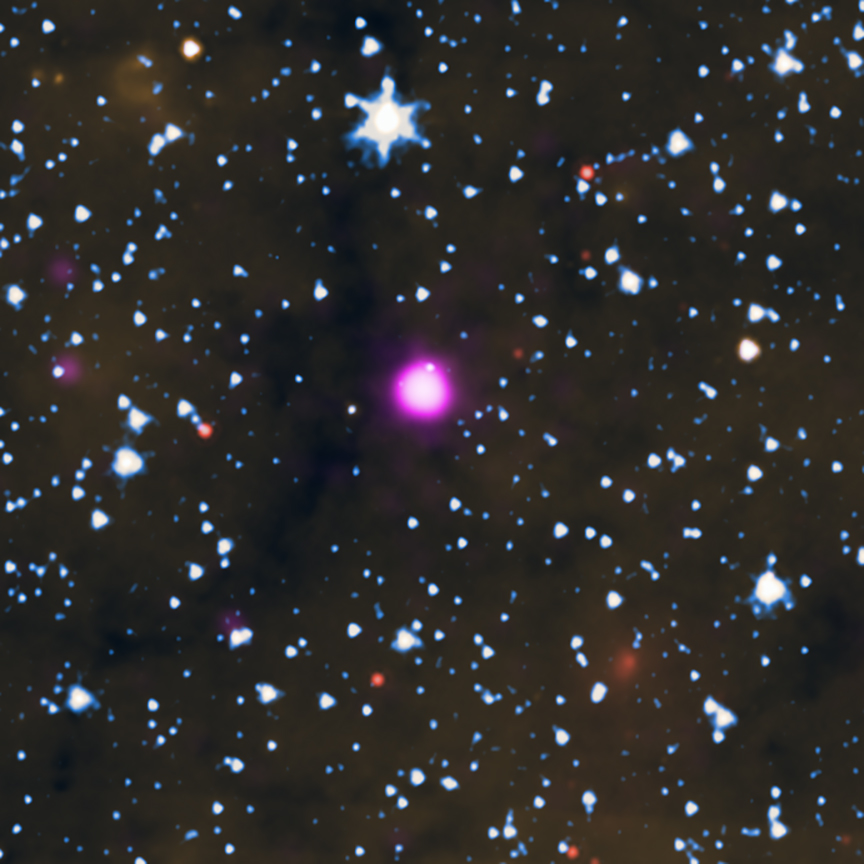
- Chandra X-ray Observatory image of Swift J1818.0–1607 (pink) composited with an infrared photograph of its location in the sky

Observation data Epoch J2000.0 Equinox ICRS
- Constellation: Sagittarius
- Right ascension: 18^{h} 18^{m} 00.23^{s}
- Declination: −16° 07′ 53.0″

Characteristics
- Spectral type: Magnetar

Astrometry
Distance	4800–8100 pc

Details
Rotation	1.363489(3) s (X-ray); 1.3635273(4) s (radio)
Age	500 years or 240 years

Other designations
- SWIFT J1818−1607, PSR J1818−1607

Database references
SIMBAD	data

SWIFT J1818.0−1607 is a young magnetar and soft gamma repeater, with an estimated age between 240 and 500 years. For context, other magnetars have a characteristic age of less than 200,000 years. This means that this neutron star could be one of the youngest neutron stars and magnetars detected so far. It is located at a distance of 4800-8100 parsecs from Earth in the Constellation of Sagittarius. It has a mass of about two solar masses packed into a region of space more than a trillion times smaller making it extremely dense. Observations revealed that SWIFT J1828.0−1607 had a spin period of 1.36 seconds.

SWIFT J1828.0−1607 has a very dynamic magnetosphere which is inferred from its variability in its shape and polarization properties. It may also provide a crucial link between High-magnetic field radio pulsars and magnetars.

== Discovery ==
It was discovered by NASA's Neil Gehrels Swift Observatory when it exhibited an X-ray burst on 12 March 2020. Further observations detected pulsed radio emissions making SWIFT J1828.0−1607 only the fifth radio-loud magnetar discovered.
