= SGR 1627−41 =

Soft gamma repeater located in the constellation of Ara

Observation data Epoch J2000 Equinox ICRS
- Constellation: Ara
- Right ascension: 16^{h} 35^{m} 52.0^{s}
- Declination: −47° 35′ 12″

Database references
SIMBAD	data

SGR 1627−41, is a soft gamma repeater (SGR), located in the constellation of Ara. It was discovered June 15, 1998, using the Burst and transient Source Experiment (BATSE) and was the first soft gamma repeater to be discovered since 1979. During a period of 6 weeks, the star burst approximately 100 times, and then went quiet. The measured bursts lasted an average of 100 milliseconds but ranged from 25 ms to 1.8 seconds. SGR 1627−41 is a persistent X-ray source. It is located at a distance of 11 kpc in the radio complex CTB 33, a star forming region that includes the supernova remnant G337.0-0.1.

This object is believed to be a neutron star that undergoes random outbursts of hard and soft X-rays. This may be caused by the loss of angular momentum of a highly magnetized neutron star, or magnetar. Alternatively, it may be a quark star, although this is considered less likely. After the 1998 outburst and the 40-day afterglow, SGR 1627−41 has remained dormant and is steadily cooling down from the peak during the event.
