= Anomalous X-ray pulsar =

Highly magnetized neutron star

Anomalous X-ray pulsars (AXPs) are an observational manifestation of magnetars—young, isolated, highly magnetized neutron stars. These energetic X-ray pulsars are characterized by slow rotation periods of ~2–12 seconds and large magnetic fields of ~10^{13}–10^{15} gauss (1 to 100 gigateslas). As of 2017, there were 12 confirmed and 2 candidate AXPs known. The identification of AXPs with magnetars was motivated by their similarity to soft gamma repeaters.

The AXP candidates and their estimated rotation period in seconds, as of 2003, were:
AXP 1E 2259+586	6.98
AXP 1E 1048-59	6.45
AXP 4U 0142+61	8.69
AXP 1RXS 1708-40	11.0
AXP 1E 1841-045	11.8
AXP AXJ1844-0258	6.97
AXP CXJ0110-7211	5.44
The second, fourth, and last names have been abbreviated.

== Sources ==
- Van Paradijs, J.; Taam, R. E.; Van Den Heuvel, E. P. J. (1995). "On the nature of the 'anomalous' 6-s X-ray pulsars". Astronomy and Astrophysics. 299: L41. Bibcode:1995A&A...299L..41V.
- Duncan, Robert C.; Thompson, Christopher (1996). "Magnetars". AIP Conference Proceedings. Vol. 366. p. 111. doi:10.1063/1.50235.
- Kouveliotou, Chryssa; Duncan, Robert C.; Thompson, Christopher (2003). "Magnetars". Scientific American. 288 (2): 34–41. Bibcode:2003SciAm.288b..34K. doi:10.1038/scientificamerican0203-34. PMID 12561456.
