= LBV 1806−20 =

Likely binary star in the constellation Sagittarius

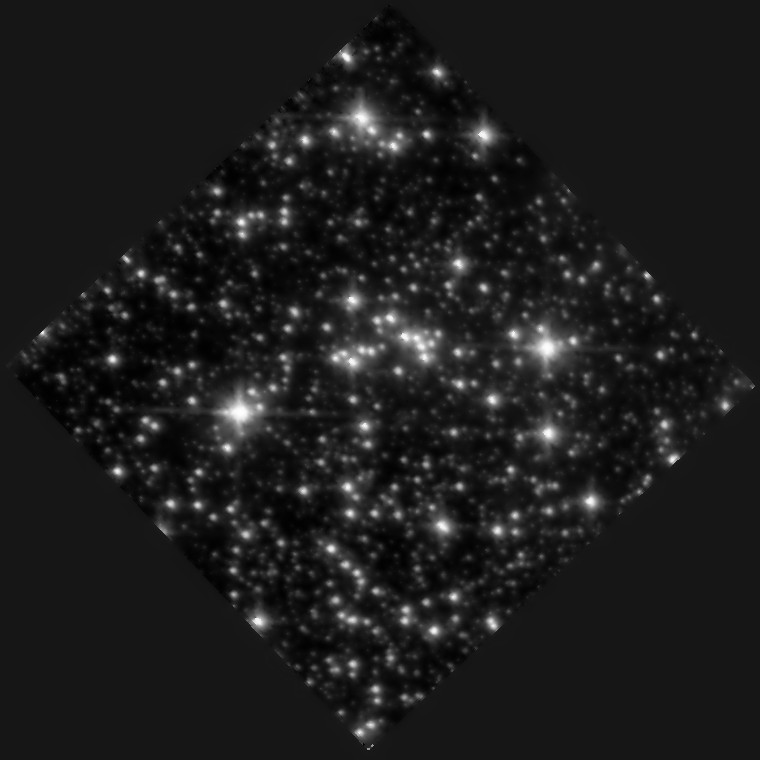
- Infrared image of Cluster 1806−20. LBV 1806−20 is the brightest star, on the left. Credit: Hubble Space Telescope

Observation data Epoch J2000 Equinox ICRS
- Constellation: Sagittarius
- Right ascension: 18^{h} 08^{m} 40.31^{s}
- Declination: −20° 24′ 41.1″

Characteristics
- Evolutionary stage: candidate LBV
- Spectral type: O9 - B2
- Apparent magnitude (J): 13.93
- Apparent magnitude (H): 10.75
- Apparent magnitude (K): 8.89

Astrometry
Distance	8.7k pc

Details
Mass	36 M_{☉}
Radius	213 R_{☉}
Luminosity	~2,000,000 L_{☉}
Temperature	18,000–32,000 K
Age	3.0 – 4.5 Myr

Other designations
- 2MASS J18084031-2024411

Database references
SIMBAD	data

LBV 1806−20 is a candidate luminous blue variable (LBV) and likely binary star located around 28,000 light-years (8,700 pc) from the Sun, towards the center of the Milky Way. It has an estimated mass of around 36 solar masses and an estimated variable luminosity of around two million times that of the Sun. It is highly luminous but is invisible from the Solar System at visual wavelengths because less than one billionth of its visible light reaches us.

When first discovered, LBV 1806−20 was considered both the most luminous and most massive star known, which challenged scientific understanding of the formation of massive stars. Recent estimates place it somewhat nearer to Earth, which when combined with its binary nature mean that it is now well within the expected range of parameters for extremely luminous stars in the galaxy. It is estimated at 2 million times as luminous as the sun which makes it one of the most luminous stars in the galaxy.

== Location ==
LBV 1806−20 lies at the core of radio nebula G10.0–0.3, which is believed to be primarily powered by its stellar wind. It is a member of the 1806−20 open cluster, itself a component of W31, one of the largest H II regions in the Milky Way. Cluster 1806−20 is made up of some highly unusual stars, including four Wolf–Rayet stars, several OB stars, and a magnetar (SGR 1806−20).

== Spectrum ==
The spectral type of LBV 1806−20 is uncertain and possibly variable. It has been constrained to between O9 and B2 on the basis of an infrared He_{I} line equivalent width. The spectrum shows strong emission in the Paschen and Brackett series of hydrogen, but also emission lines of helium, Fe_{II}, Mg_{II}, and Na_{I}. The lines are broad and have uneven profiles, some showing P Cygni profiles. High resolution spectra show that some He_{I} absorption lines are doubled.

== Properties ==
Intervening dust in the direction of the Galactic Center absorb an estimated 35 magnitudes at visual wavelengths, and so most observations are conducted using infrared telescopes. On the basis of its luminosity and spectral type it is suspected of being an LBV, but despite the name the characteristic photometric and spectroscopic variations have not yet been observed so it remains just a candidate.

== Binary ==
To account for the doubled He_{I} lines in its spectrum and the inconsistent mass, luminosity and age estimates, LBV 1806−20 has been proposed to be a binary. The emission lines are single, so only one star appears to have a dense stellar wind as might be expected from an LBV.
