= David Louis Band =

American astronomer (1957–2009)

- Born: January 9, 1957; Boston, United States
- Died: March 16, 2009 (aged 52); Potomac, Maryland, United States
- Resting place: Garden of Remembrance cemetery, Clarksburg, Maryland
- Education: Harvard University, Physics Ph.D. 1985, M.A. 1980; MIT, Physics B.S. 1979
- Spouse: Debra Band
- Children: 2
- Scientific career
- Fields: Astronomy
- Workplaces: University of Maryland, Baltimore, Goddard Space Flight Center, Los Alamos National Laboratory, Lawrence Livermore National Laboratory
- Thesis: Non-thermal Radiation Mechanisms and Processes in SS 433 and Active Galactic Nuclei (1985)
- Doctoral advisor: Jonathan Grindlay
- Website: universe.gsfc.nasa.gov/staff/CVs/David.Band

David Louis Band or David L. Band (9 January 1957 – 16 March 2009) was an astronomer who studied the theory of gamma-ray bursts.

== Life ==
David Band was born January 9, 1957, in Boston, Massachusetts to a Jewish family. His father was Arnold Band, professor of Jewish and Hebrew literature at University of California, Los Angeles (UCLA), and his mother was Ora Band, Hebrew teacher.

After graduating from Massachusetts Institute of Technology (MIT) in Physics (1979), David continued as a graduate student in Physics at Harvard. He got his MA in 1980 and his Ph.D. Physics at Harvard in 1985 in the title of "Non-thermal Radiation Mechanisms and Processes in SS 433 and Active Galactic Nuclei", supervised by Prof. Jonathan Grindlay.

== Scientific work ==
After he received his Ph.D. Dr. Band held postdoctoral positions at the Lawrence Livermore Laboratory, the University of California at Berkeley, and the Center for Astronomy and Space Sciences at the University of California, San Diego. He worked on the Burst and Transient Source Experiment (BATSE) that was part of the Compton Gamma Ray Observatory (CGRO), launched in 1991.

He also proposed the functional form (termed the Band-function) for the description of the prompt spectra of the gamma-ray bursts.

After the CGRO mission ended, Dr. Band moved to the Los Alamos National Laboratory (LANL) where he worked mainly on classified research and continued to work on GRB energetics and spectra. When NASA planned two new follow-up missions to CGRO, the Swift Gamma-Ray Burst Mission and Fermi Gamma-ray Space Telescope (formerly named Gamma-ray Large Area Space Telescope (GLAST)) observatories, David Band seized an opportunity in 2001 to join the staff the Fermi Science Support Center at the NASA Goddard Space Flight Center (GSFC).
