= 1E 1048−59 =

Star in the constellation Carina and closest magnetar to Earth

1E 1048.1−5937
Observation data Epoch J2000.0 Equinox ICRS
- Constellation: Carina
- Right ascension: 10^{h} 50^{m} 08.93^{s}
- Declination: −59° 53′ 19.9″

Other designations
- 1RXS J105007.2−595329

Database references
SIMBAD	data

AXP 1E 1048.1−5937 was the first anomalous X-ray pulsar ever observed to emit an SGR-like X-ray burst. It is also the closest magnetar to Earth located 2,759 parsecs (9,000 light-years) away in the constellation Carina.
