= SGR 1900+14 =

Soft gamma repeater in the constellation Aquila

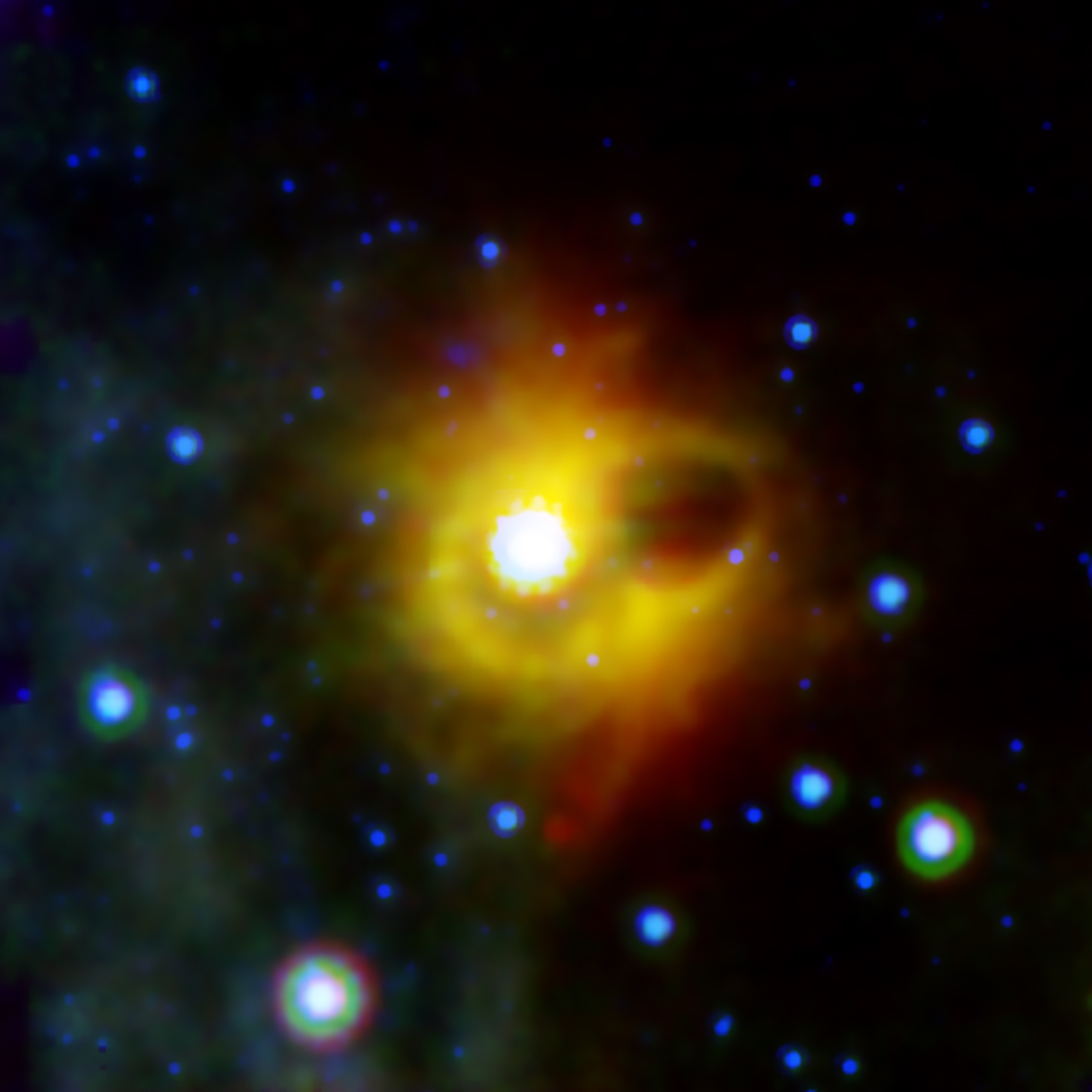
- SGR 1900+14

Observation data Epoch J2000 Equinox J2000
- Constellation: Aquila
- Right ascension: 19^{h} 07^{m} 16.85^{s}
- Declination: +09° 18′ 50.4″

Characteristics
- Variable type: Gamma ray burst

Astrometry
Distance	20 kly (6.1 kpc)

Details
Mass	? M_{☉}
Rotation	5.2

Other designations
- GRB 990110, GRB 980908, KONUS 24.03.79, TGRS 757, GBS 1900+14, GRB 790327A, KONUS 27.03.79a, TGRS 756, GRB 981022, GRB 790327, KONUS 25.03.79a, Trigger 7171, GRB 790324, GRB 790325A, Trigger 7124, GRB 980927, GRB 980827, RX J190714.1+091919, Trigger 7073.

Database references
SIMBAD	data

Data sources:

Hipparcos Catalogue, CCDM (2002), Bright Star Catalogue (5th rev. ed.)

SGR 1900+14 is a soft gamma repeater (SGR), located in the constellation of Aquila about 20,000 light-years away. It is assumed to be an example of an intensely magnetic star, known as a magnetar. It is thought to have formed after a fairly recent supernova explosion.

An intense gamma-ray burst from this star was detected on August 27, 1998; shortly thereafter a new radio source appeared in that region of the sky. Despite the large distance to this SGR, estimated at 20,000 light years, the burst had large effects on the Earth's atmosphere. The atoms in the ionosphere, which are usually ionized by the Sun's radiation by day and recombine to neutral atoms by night, were ionized at nighttime at levels not much lower than the normal daytime level. The Rossi X-ray Timing Explorer (RXTE), an X-ray satellite, received its strongest signal from this burst at this time, even though it was directed at a different part of the sky, and should normally have been shielded from the radiation.

NASA's Spitzer Space Telescope detected a mysterious ring around SGR 1900+14 at two narrow infrared frequencies in 2005 and 2007. The 2007 Spitzer image showed no discernible change in the ring after two years. The ring measures seven light-years across. The origin of the ring is currently unknown and is the subject of an article in the May 29, 2008 issue of the journal Nature.
