= SGR 1806−20 =

Magnetar in the constellation Sagittarius

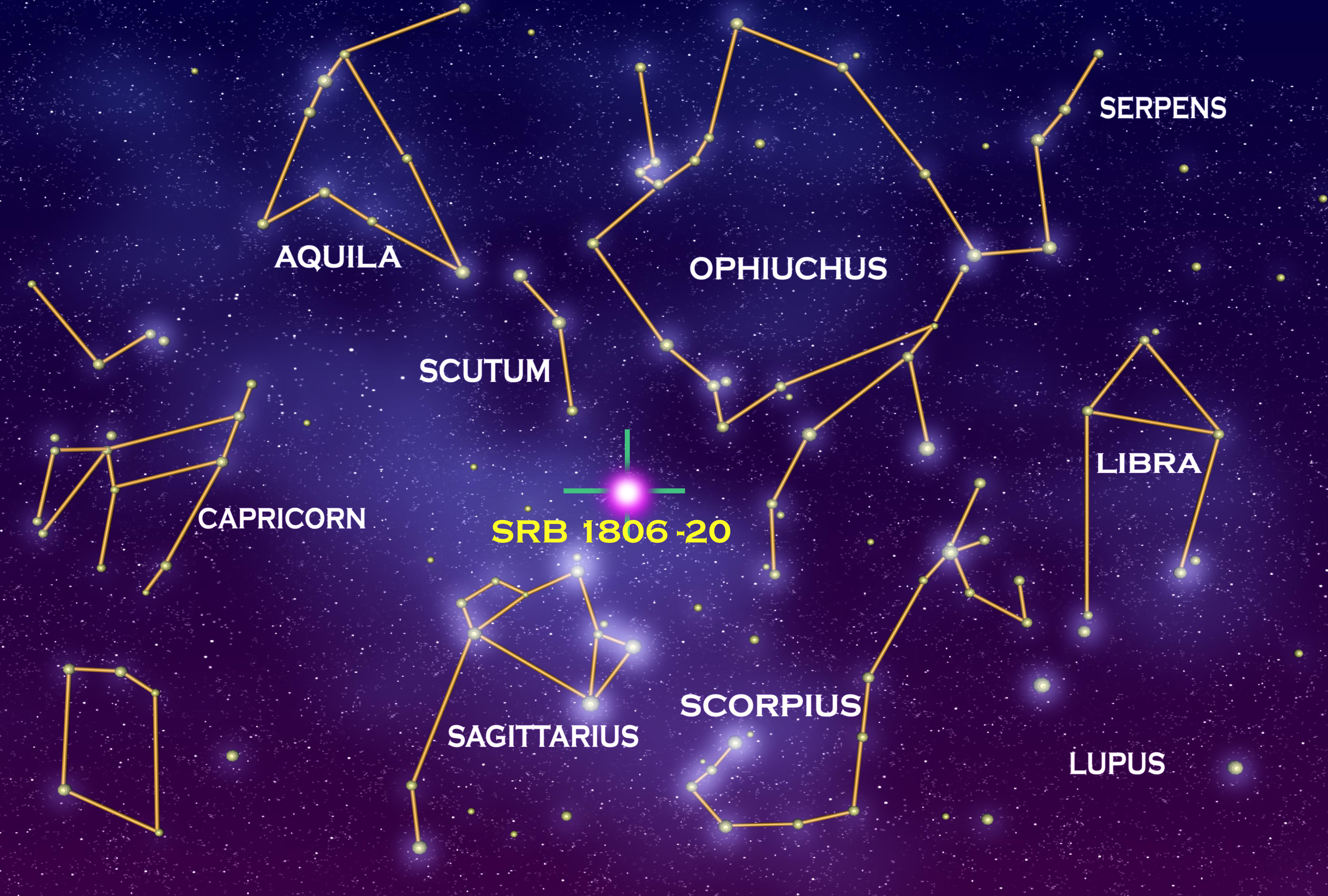
- SGR 1806-20 is located in the constellation Sagittarius.

Observation data Epoch J2000 Equinox ICRS
- Constellation: Sagittarius
- Right ascension: 18^{h} 08^{m} 39.32^{s}
- Declination: −20° 24′ 39.5″
- Apparent magnitude (V): totally obscured

Astrometry
Distance	42,000 ly (13,000 pc)

Details
Rotation	7.55592 s

Other designations
- GRB 790107, INTEGRAL1 84, AX 1805.7-2025 GRB 970912, INTREF 882, CXOU J180839.3-202439, HETE Trigger 1566, KONUS 07.01.79, EQ 1805.7-2025, HETE Trigger 3801, PSR J1808−2024, GBS 1806-20, HETE Trigger 3800, RX J1808.6−2024

Database references
SIMBAD	data

SGR 1806−20 is a magnetar, a type of neutron star with a very powerful magnetic field, that was discovered in 1979 and identified as a soft gamma repeater. SGR 1806−20 is located about 13 kiloparsecs (42,000 light-years) from Earth on the far side of the Milky Way in the constellation of Sagittarius. It has a diameter of no more than 20 kilometres (12 mi) and rotates on its axis every 7.5 seconds (30,000 kilometres per hour (19,000 mph) rotation speed at the equator on the surface). As of 2016, SGR 1806-20 is the most highly magnetized object ever observed, with a magnetic field of over 10^{15} gauss (G) (10^{11} tesla) intensity (compared to the Sun's 1–5 G and Earth's 0.25–0.65 G).

== Explosion ==
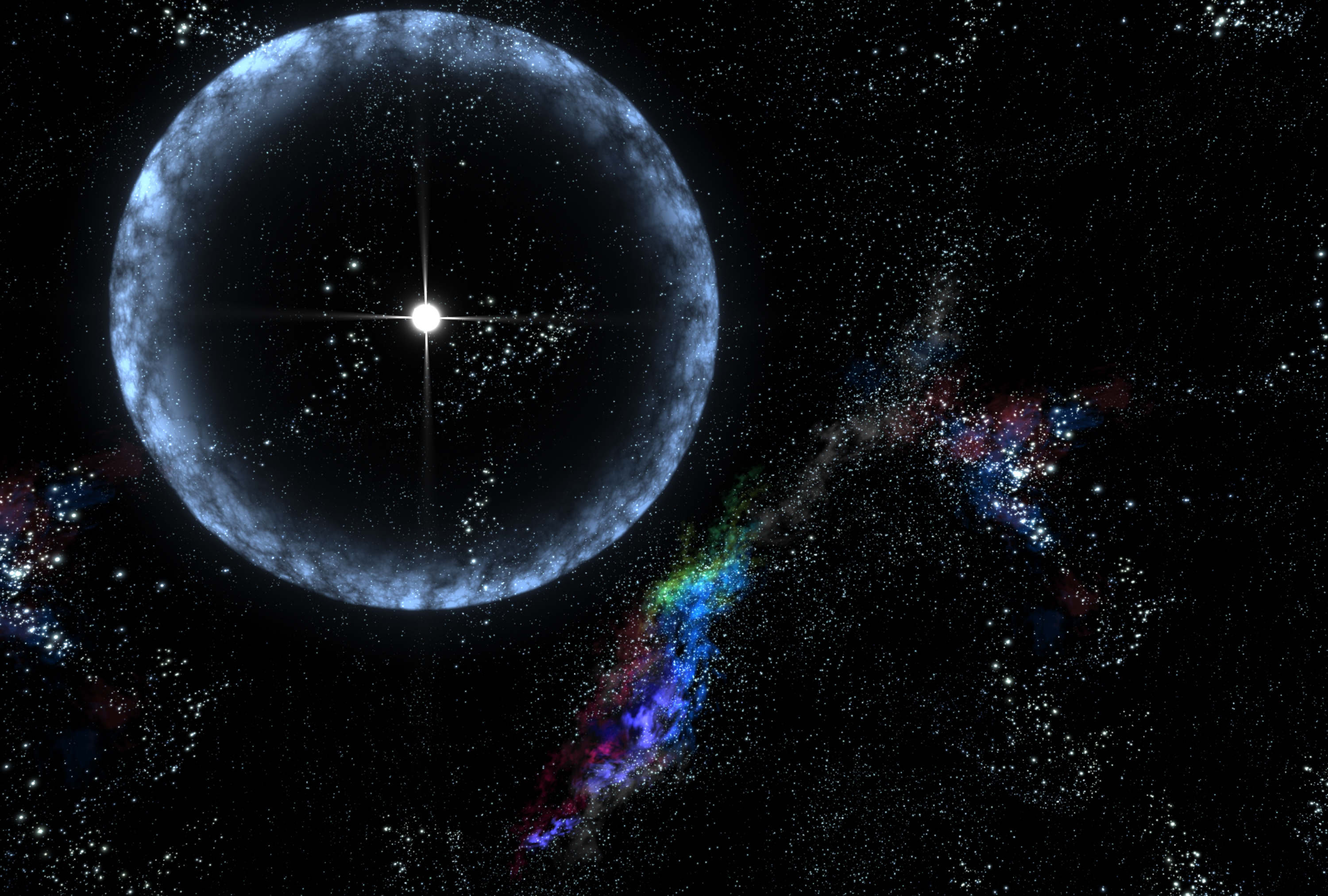
Artist's impression of the surrounding cloud bubble

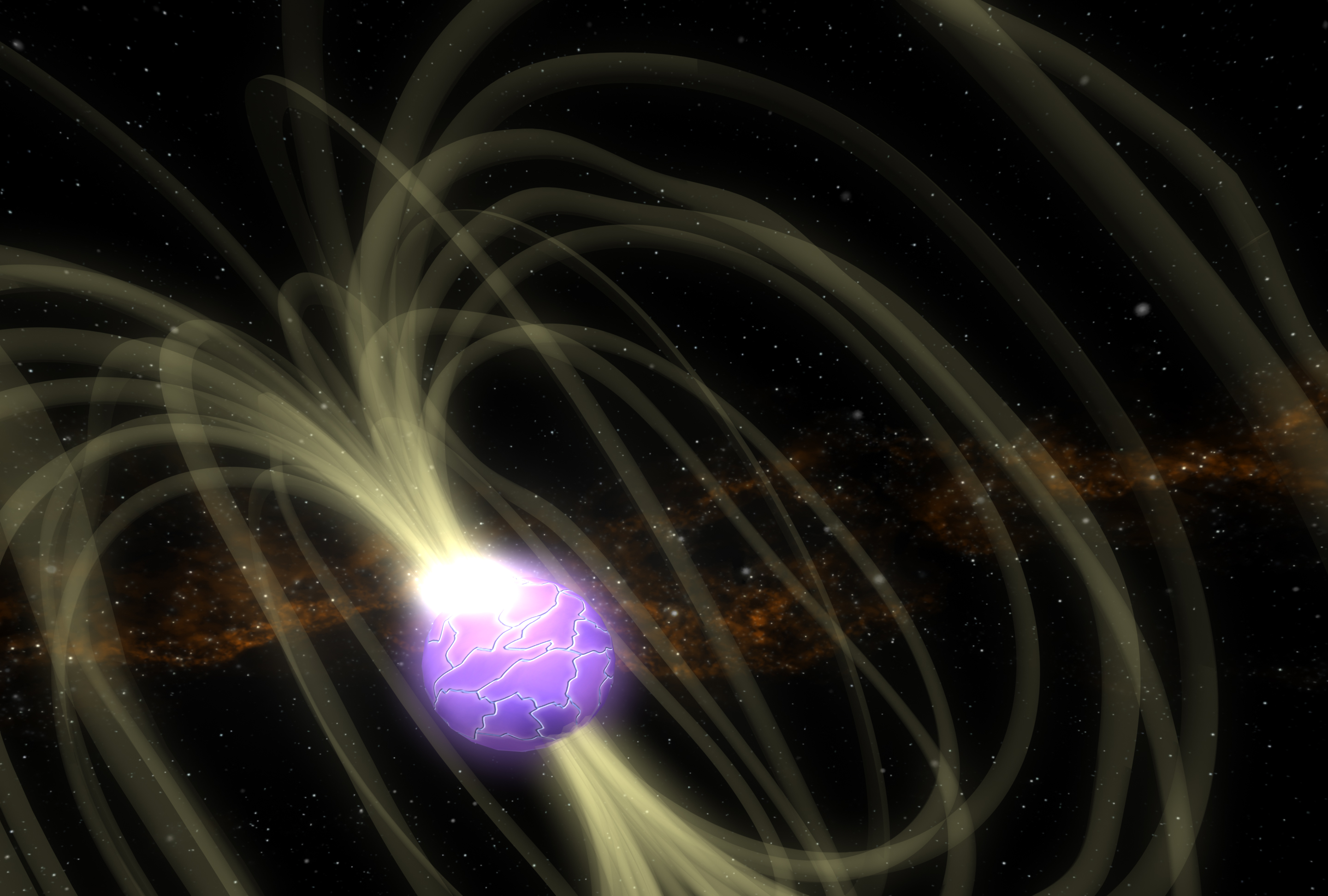
Artist rendering of central neutron star

42,000 years after a starquake occurred on the surface of SGR 1806-20, the radiation from the resultant explosion reached Earth on December 27, 2004 (GRB 041227). In terms of gamma rays, the burst had an absolute magnitude of around −29. (Note: As measured by various space-based and land-based astronomical observatories, including the Swift spacecraft.) It was the brightest event known to have been sighted on this planet from an origin outside the Solar System until GRB 080319B. The magnetar released more energy in one-tenth of a second (1.0×10^{40} J) than the Sun releases in 150,000 years (4×10^{26} W × 4.8×10^{12} s = 1.85×10^{39} J). Such a burst is thought to be the largest explosion observed in this galaxy by humans since the SN 1604, a supernova observed by Johannes Kepler in 1604. The gamma rays struck Earth's ionosphere and created more ionization, which briefly expanded the ionosphere. The quake was equivalent to a magnitude 32 on the Richter scale.

A similar blast within 3 parsecs (10 light years) of Earth would severely affect the atmosphere, by destroying the ozone layer and causing mass extinction, and be similar in effect to a 12-kiloton nuclear blast at 7.5 kilometres (4.7 mi). The nearest known magnetar to Earth is 1E 1048.1-5937, located 9,000 light-years away in the constellation Carina.

== Location ==
SGR 1806−20 lies at the core of radio nebula G10.0-0.3 and is a member of an open cluster named after it, itself a component of W31, one of the largest H II regions in the Milky Way. Cluster 1806-20 is made up of some highly unusual stars, including at least two carbon-rich Wolf–Rayet stars (WC9d and WCL), two blue hypergiants, and LBV 1806-20, one of the brightest/most massive stars in the galaxy.

== Planetary system ==
A 2024 paper posited that periodic gamma-ray and X-ray bursts from the pulsar are caused by a planet orbiting SGR 1806-20. This SGR 1806-20 b would be some kind of rocky world with a mass between 10-18 Earth masses with an orbital period of 398 days and a semi-major axis of 1.18 astronomical units. SGR 1806-20 b is notable for its eccentricity of 0.994, which would make it the most eccentric exoplanet known.

== See also ==
- LBV 1806−20 – luminous blue variable
