= 1806−20 cluster =

Heavily obscured star cluster on the far side of the Milky Way

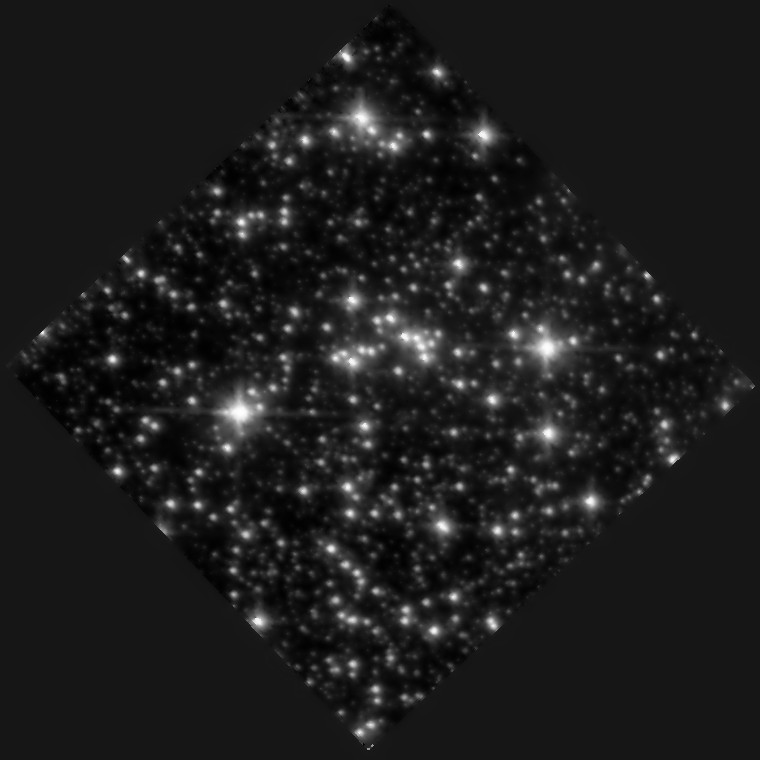
- H-band infrared image of 1806−20 cluster

Observation data (J2000 epoch)
- Right ascension: 18^{h} 08^{m} 39.33^{s}
- Declination: −20° 24′ 40.0″
- Distance: ~28000 ly (~8700 pc)

Physical characteristics
- Contains SGR 1806−20 and LBV 1806−20.
- Other designations: G10.0-0.3, W31

Associations
- Constellation: Sagittarius

1806−20 (originally named the SGR 1806−20 cluster) is a heavily obscured star cluster on the far side of the Milky Way, approximately 28,000 light-years distant. Some sources claim as far as 50,000. It contains the soft gamma repeater SGR 1806−20 and the luminous blue variable hypergiant LBV 1806−20, a candidate for the most luminous star in the Milky Way. LBV 1806−20 and many of the other massive stars in the cluster are thought likely to end as supernovas in a few million years, leaving only neutron stars or black holes as remnants.

The cluster is heavily obscured by intervening dust, and mostly visible in the infrared. It is part of the larger W31 H II region and giant molecular cloud. It has a compact core of ~0.2 pc in diameter with a more extended halo of ~2 pc in diameter containing the LBV and at least three Wolf–Rayet stars (of types WC8, WN6, and WN7) and an OB supergiant, plus other young massive stars.

== See also ==
- Charles Wolf
- Georges Rayet
