= Labquake =

A laboratory earthquake, commonly referred to as a labquake, is a small-scale failure event in rock (or other experimental materials) generated and studied within controlled environments. These non-hazardous events are engineered to mimic the physical conditions of the Earth's crust, allowing experimentalists to directly observe fault nucleation, rupture propagation, and friction dynamics that are observationally inaccessible at natural seismogenic depths. Labquakes occur with low magnitudes, sometimes measuring as low as -7.9.

== Motivation ==
=== Scaling and geophysical significance ===
Laboratory experiments facilitate the downscaling of vast geophysical processes into controlled environments, allowing for the isolation of the fundamental physics governing earthquake rupture. Since natural seismic events occur at depths that often preclude direct observation, labquakes provide a primary methodology for obtaining high-resolution, direct constraints on dynamic processes that are otherwise inaccessible in the field. This downscaling enables the systematic measurement and manipulation of critical variables, such as fracture energy, pore pressure, and asperity tracking across repeatable seismic cycles. Furthermore, these experiments provide an empirical foundation for testing conceptual models and material-science-based theories regarding fault zone behavior.

=== Key observed phenomena ===
==== Nucleation ====
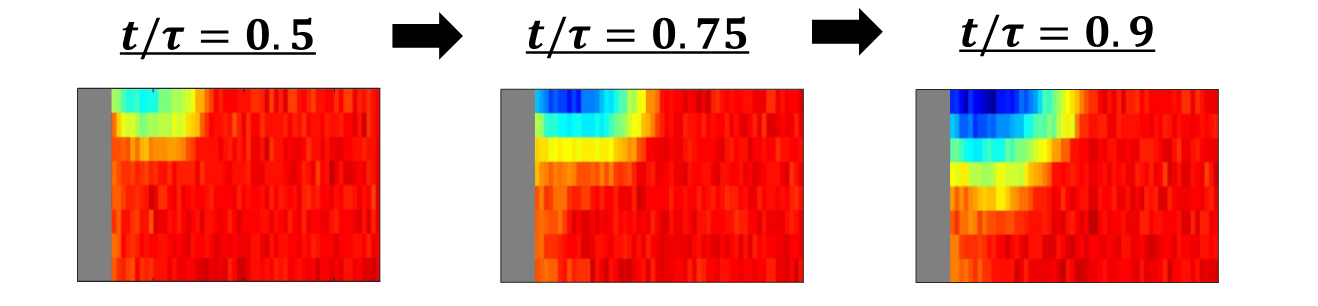
Evolution of rupture nucleation at a frictional interface. Color gradient shows real contact area: warm tones denote high contact, while cool tones track the slow nucleation patch.

Laboratory experiments utilize dense sensor arrays and high-resolution optical imaging to monitor earthquake nucleation, tracking the expansion of slip patches and the transition to accelerating rupture. Such observations are rarely possible in natural settings due to the depth and unpredictability of seismic events. Furthermore, laboratory instrumentation provides significantly higher resolution and sensitivity than field-based tools, such as borehole strainmeters, which often fail to detect the early, small-scale slow slip preceding a major event.

==== Rupture propagation ====
Laboratory experiments facilitate the high-resolution observation of complex rupture dynamics, including the transition from subsonic to supershear velocities, by tracking the evolution of the real contact area during failure. These setups provide empirical validation for fracture mechanics models that predict rupture speeds based on the interplay between driving stress and frictional interface properties. Furthermore, labquakes enable the identification of critical rupture lengths required for sustained propagation and the study of mechanisms governing rupture arrest and daughter-crack nucleation within nonuniform systems.

== Experimental setups ==
=== Experiment type ===
==== Translational loading apparatuses ====
Common translational loading configurations for labquake experiments. From left to right: (a) Direct Shear, utilizing a single interface monitored by strain gauges; (b) Double Direct Shear, shearing two symmetric gouge layers using a central block; and (c) Uniaxial Loading, where an inclined fault resolves vertical pressure into both normal and shear stresses.

Translational loading apparatuses apply normal and shear stresses to planar interfaces or gouge layers to monitor slip under controlled conditions. While direct shear and biaxial systems utilize independent mechanisms for each stress component, uniaxial setups resolve a single compressive load into both components by using an inclined fault plane. Experimental configurations range from two-block single interfaces to three-block double-direct shear assemblies. These systems are instrumented with high-resolution stress, displacement, and acoustic sensors, occasionally optical imaging, to track variables such as stress drops, dilation, and the spatiotemporal evolution of the real area of contact throughout the experiment.

==== Rotary shear ====
Rotary shear apparatuses utilize cylindrical or annular rock specimens to achieve high slip velocities and unlimited slip distances, facilitating the study of frictional behavior at co-seismic rates. These configurations typically feature a rotating block driven by a high-torque motor and a stationary block, often employing flywheels and electromagnetic clutches to simulate rapid earthquake acceleration. This type of apparatus allows for the systematic observation of high-velocity phenomena such as friction-induced melting.

=== Materials and fault anatomy ===
The choice of experimental materials and fault properties depends on the specific experiment objective. Bulk material will vary whether the goal is to mimic complex, uneven surfaces of tectonic faults or if to image the interface and track ruptures as they happen.

==== Host rocks ====
Natural rocks such as granite, marble, sandstone, metagabbro, and diabase are selected as host materials to replicate the high stiffness and multi-scale roughness characteristic of natural faults in the brittle crust. Additionally using natural rock specimens allows researchers to study the spontaneous production of granular gouge from surface wear, providing a direct physical analogue for the dynamic weakening mechanisms observed in geological earthquakes.

==== Analogue materials ====
Glassy polymers such as PMMA, polycarbonate, and Homalite-100, are frequently used as host materials because their low stiffness relative to natural rock increases critical nucleation lengths and slows down propagation velocities, making rupture processes easier to observe. Their transparency allows researchers to utilize high-speed imaging to directly visualize the fault interface and surrounding stress dynamics.

==== Interface properties ====
By directly modifying and investigating the fault surface, researchers can use these laboratory apparatuses to isolate specific frictional phenomena and localized interface processes within a highly controlled environment. For instance, simulating induced seismicity via rapid fluid injection allows for the observation of swarm triggering, while tracking the evolution of slow nucleation fronts helps establish the stress thresholds required to initiate dynamic frictional motion. Additionally, experimental oiling of the interface reveals complex boundary-lubricated regimes where the lubricant counterintuitively reduces static friction while increasing the fracture energy required to break contacts. Finally, embedding granular patches into the interface demonstrates how uncoupled, slowly slipping zones interact with locked regions to act as nucleation centers for seismic events.
