= SGR J1745−2900 =

Magnetar located near the black hole Sagittarius A*

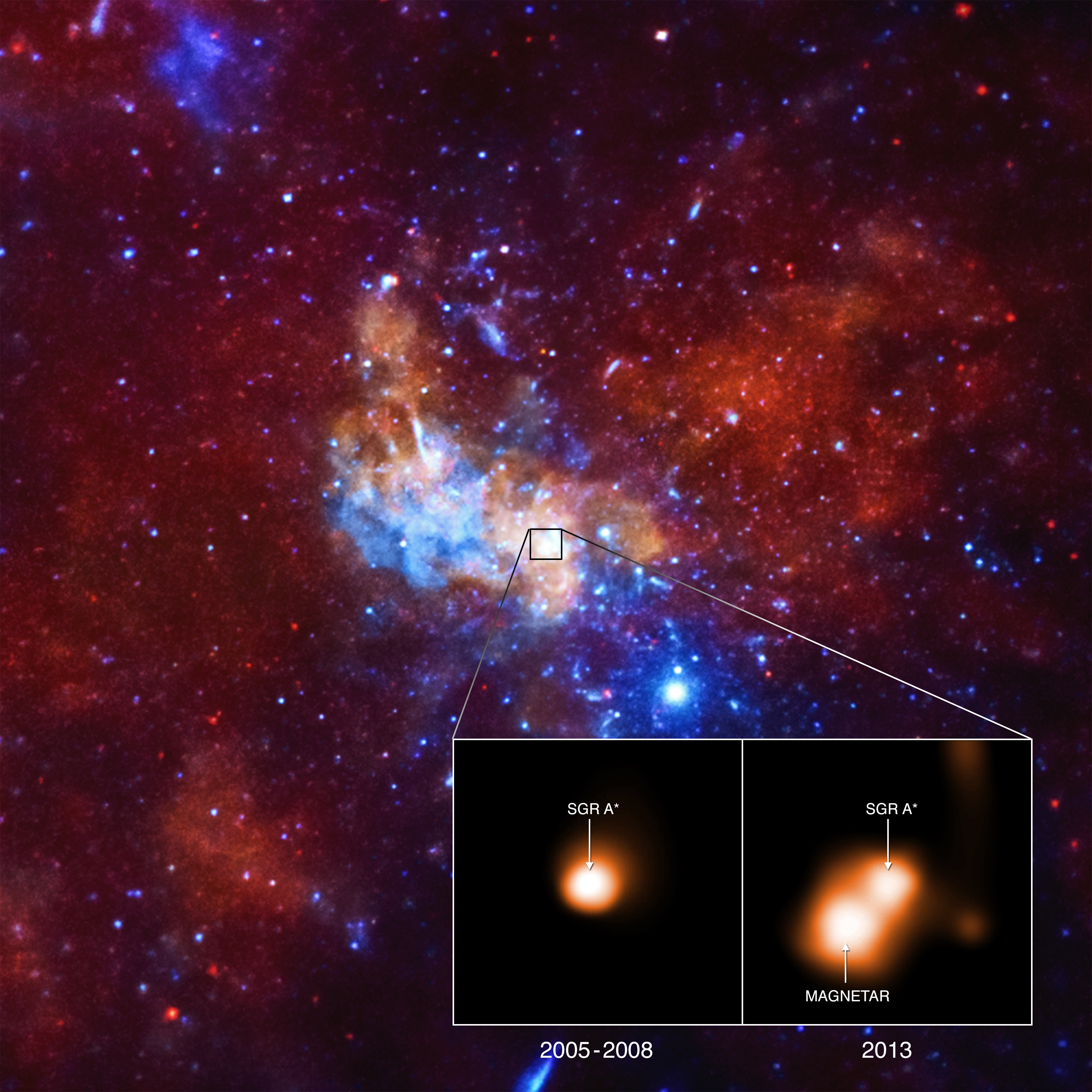
- Image of SGR J1745−2900 produced by the Chandra X-ray Observatory

Observation data Epoch J2000 Equinox ICRS
- Constellation: Sagittarius
- Right ascension: 17^{h} 45^{m} 40.21^{s}
- Declination: −29° 00′ 29.2″

Other designations
- PSR J1745−2900

Database references
SIMBAD	data

SGR J1745−2900, or PSR J1745−2900, is the first-discovered magnetar orbiting the black hole Sagittarius A*, in the center of the Milky Way. The magnetar was discovered in 2013 using the Effelsberg 100-m Radio Telescope, the Nancay Decimetric Radio Telescope, and the Jodrell Bank Lovell Telescope. The magnetar has a period of 3.76 s and a magnetic flux density of ~ 10^{10} T (10^{14} G). The magnetar, which is also a pulsar, is 0.33 ly from the central black hole.

The object helps researchers probe the ionized interstellar medium (ISM) toward the Galactic Center (GC), and could be useful in testing quantum gravity effects.
