= Magnetar =

Type of neutron star with a strong magnetic field

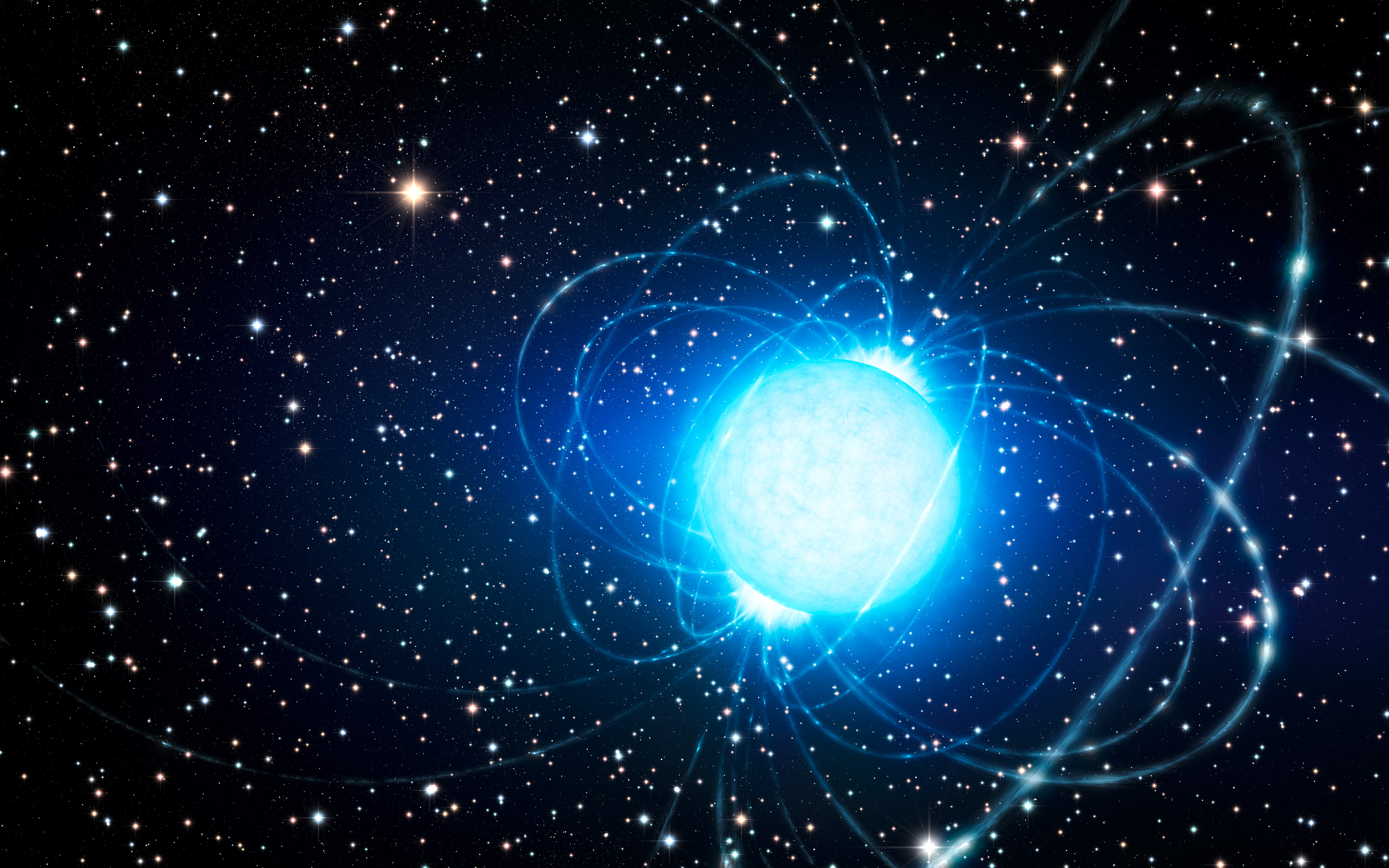
Artist's conception of a powerful magnetar in a star cluster

A magnetar is a type of neutron star with an extremely powerful magnetic field (~10^{9} to 10^{11} T, ~10^{13} to 10^{15} G). The magnetic-field decay (or dissipation) powers the emission of high-energy electromagnetic radiation, particularly X-rays and gamma rays.

The existence of magnetars was proposed in 1992 by Robert Duncan and Christopher Thompson, who sought to explain the properties of transient sources of gamma rays, now known as soft gamma repeaters (SGRs). Over the following decade, the magnetar hypothesis became widely accepted, and was extended to explain anomalous X-ray pulsars (AXPs). Out of approximately 3,000 neutron stars, there are 31 confirmed magnetars of which five are both magnetars and pulsars, as of January 2021.

It has been suggested that magnetars are the source of fast radio bursts (FRB), in particular as a result of findings in 2020 by scientists using the Australian Square Kilometre Array Pathfinder (ASKAP) radio telescope.

== Description ==
Like other neutron stars, magnetars are around 20 kilometres (12 mi) in diameter, and have a mass of about 1.4 solar masses. They are formed by the collapse of a star with a mass 10–25 times that of the Sun. The density of a magnetar's interior is such that a tablespoon of its material would have a mass of over 100 million tons. Magnetars are distinguished from other neutron stars by having even stronger magnetic fields and rotating more slowly. Most observed magnetars rotate once every two to ten seconds, whereas typical neutron stars, observed as radio pulsars, rotate one to ten times per second. A magnetar's magnetic field gives rise to very strong and characteristic bursts of X-rays and gamma rays. The active life of a magnetar is short compared to other celestial bodies. Their strong magnetic fields decay after about 10,000 years, after which activity and strong X-ray emission cease. Given the number of magnetars observable today, one estimate puts the number of inactive magnetars in the Milky Way at 30 million or more.

Starquakes triggered on the surface of the magnetar disturb the magnetic field that encompasses it, often leading to extremely powerful gamma-ray flare emissions which have been recorded on Earth in 1979, 1998, and 2004.

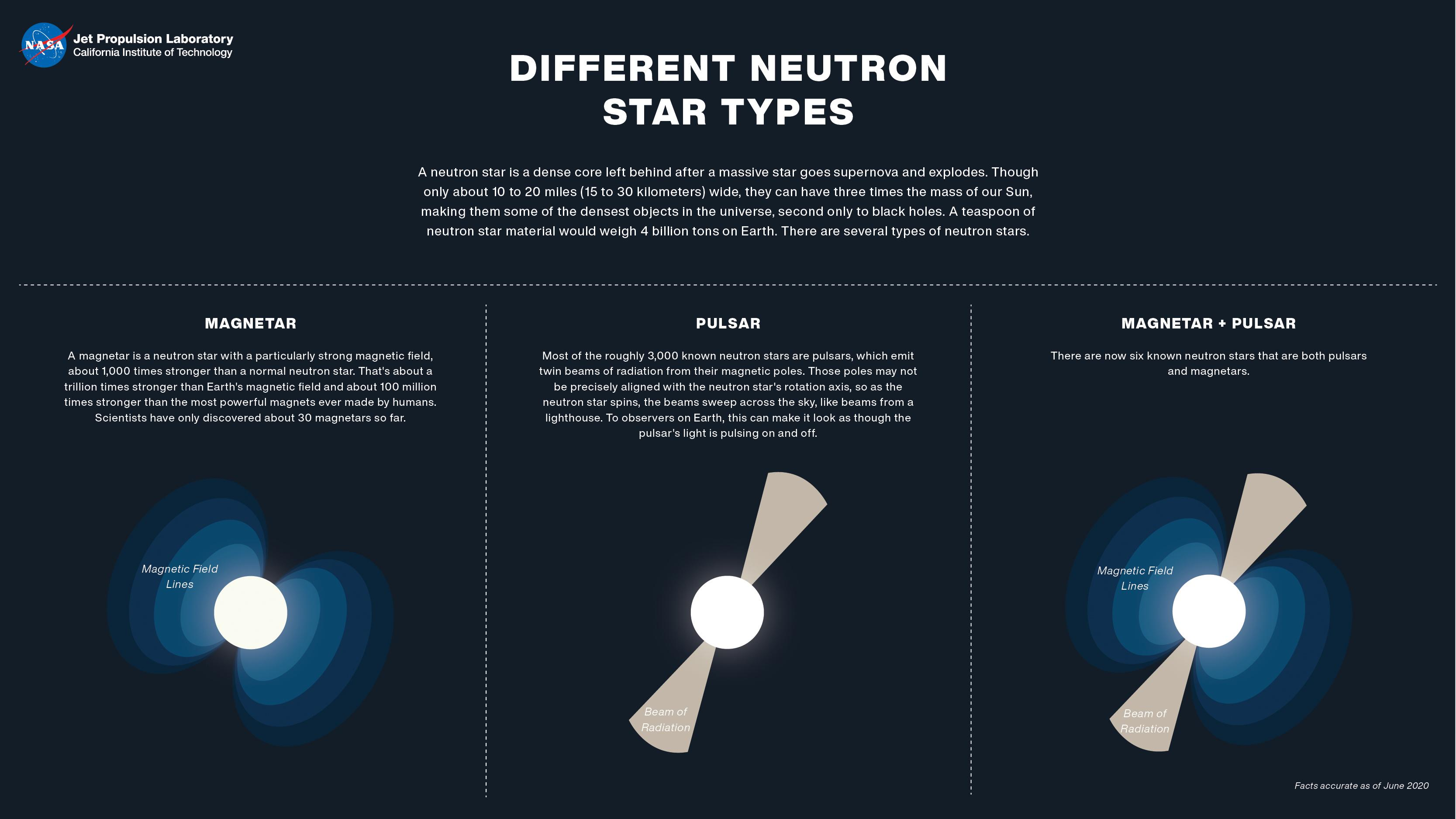
Infographic of Different Neutron Star Types produced by JPL (24 June 2020), describing magnetars (left), pulsars (center), and neutron stars with the qualities of both (right)

=== Magnetic field ===
Magnetars are characterized by their extremely powerful magnetic fields of ~10^{9} to 10^{11} T. These magnetic fields are ten million times stronger to a hundred thousand times stronger than the strongest man-made magnet, and about a trillion times more powerful than the field surrounding Earth. Earth has a geomagnetic field of 30–60 microteslas, and a neodymium-based, rare-earth magnet has a field of about 1.25 tesla, with a magnetic energy density of 4.0 × 10^{5} J/m^{3}. A magnetar's 10^{10} tesla field, by contrast, has an energy density of 4.0×10^{25} J/m^{3}, with an E/c^{2} mass density more than 10,000 times that of lead. The magnetic field of a magnetar would be lethal even at a distance of 1,000 km due to the strong magnetic field distorting the electron clouds of the subject's constituent atoms, rendering the chemistry of sustaining life impossible. At a distance of halfway from Earth to the Moon, an average distance between the Earth and the Moon being 384,400 km (238,900 miles), a magnetar could wipe information from the magnetic stripes of all credit cards on Earth. As of 2020, they are the most powerful magnetic objects detected throughout the universe.

As described in the February 2003 Scientific American cover story, remarkable things happen within a magnetic field of magnetar strength. "X-ray photons readily split in two or merge. The vacuum itself is polarized, becoming strongly birefringent, like a calcite crystal. Atoms are deformed into long cylinders thinner than the quantum-relativistic de Broglie wavelength of an electron." In a field of about 10^{5} teslas atomic orbitals deform into rod shapes. At 10^{10} teslas, a hydrogen atom becomes 200 times as narrow as its normal diameter.

==== Origins of magnetic fields ====
The dominant model of the strong fields of magnetars is that it results from a magnetohydrodynamic dynamo process in the turbulent, extremely dense conducting fluid that exists before the neutron star settles into its equilibrium configuration. These fields then persist due to persistent currents in a proton-superconductor phase of matter that exists at an intermediate depth within the neutron star (where neutrons predominate by mass). A similar magnetohydrodynamic dynamo process produces even more intense transient fields during coalescence of a pair of neutron stars. An alternative model is that they simply result from the collapse of stars with unusually strong magnetic fields.

=== Formation ===
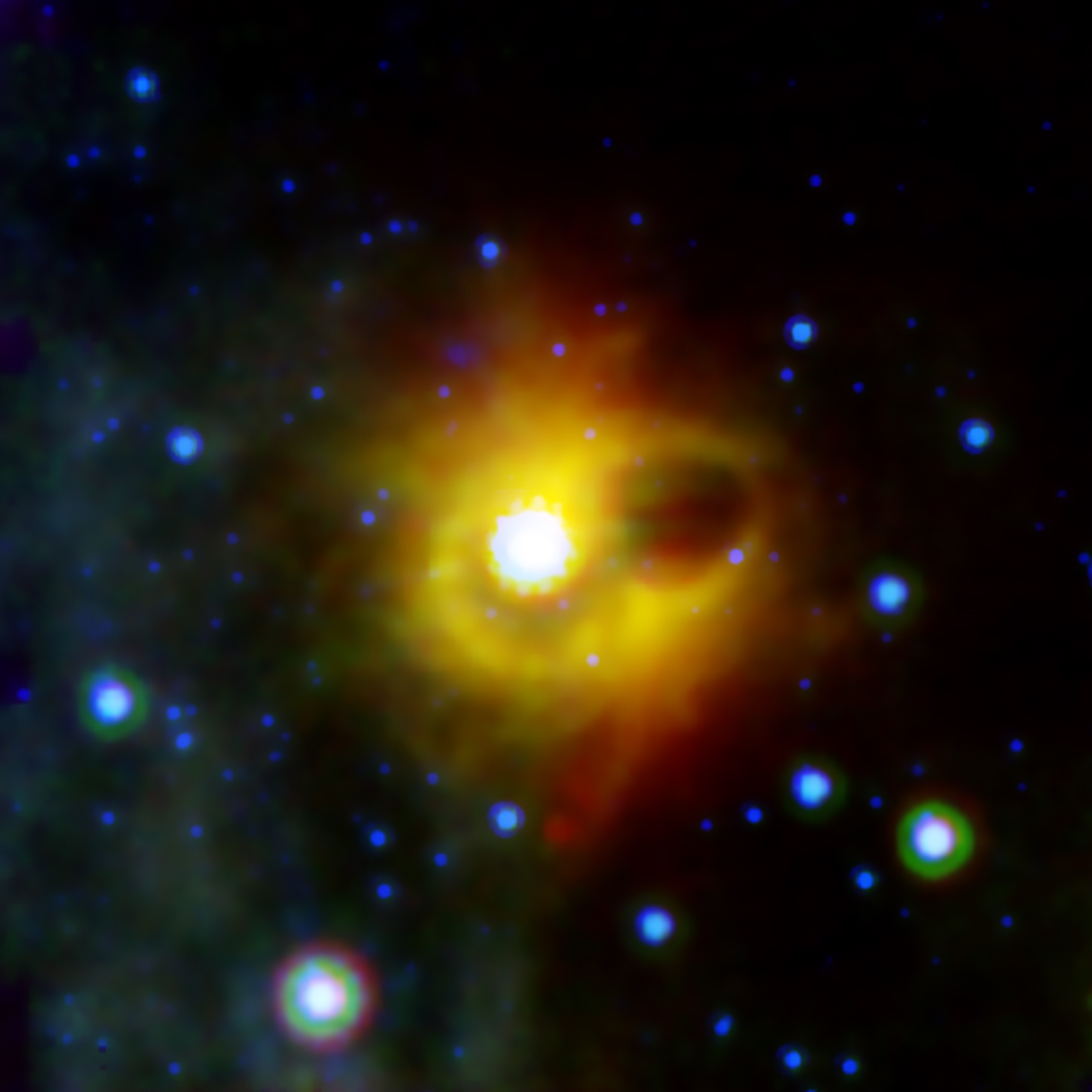
Magnetar SGR 1900+14 (center of image) showing a surrounding ring of gas 7 light-years across in infrared light, as seen by the Spitzer Space Telescope. The magnetar itself is not visible at this wavelength but has been seen in X-ray light.

In a supernova, a star collapses to a neutron star, and its magnetic field increases dramatically in strength through conservation of magnetic flux. Halving a linear dimension increases the magnetic field strength fourfold. Duncan and Thompson calculated that when the spin, temperature and magnetic field of a newly formed neutron star falls into the right ranges, a dynamo mechanism could act, converting heat and rotational energy into magnetic energy and increasing the magnetic field, normally an already enormous 10^{8} teslas, to more than 10^{11} teslas (or 10^{15} gauss). The result is a magnetar. It is estimated that about one in ten supernova explosions results in a magnetar rather than a more standard neutron star or pulsar.

=== 1979 discovery ===
On March 5, 1979, a few months after the successful dropping of landers into the atmosphere of Venus, the two uncrewed Soviet spaceprobes Venera 11 and 12, then in heliocentric orbit, were hit by a blast of gamma radiation at approximately 10:51 EST. This contact raised the radiation readings on both probes from a normal 100 counts per second to over 200,000 counts per second in only a fraction of a millisecond.

Eleven seconds later, Helios 2, a NASA probe, itself in orbit around the Sun, was saturated by the blast of radiation. It soon hit Venus, where the Pioneer Venus Orbiter's detectors were overcome by the wave. Shortly thereafter, the gamma rays inundated the detectors of three U.S. Department of Defense Vela satellites, the Soviet Prognoz 7 satellite, and the Einstein Observatory, all orbiting Earth. Before exiting the Solar System, the radiation was detected by the International Sun–Earth Explorer in halo orbit.

At the time, this was the strongest wave of extra-solar gamma rays ever detected, at over 100 times as intense as any previously known burst. Given the speed of light and its detection by several widely dispersed spacecraft, the source of the gamma radiation could be triangulated to within an accuracy of approximately 2 arcseconds. The direction of the source corresponded with SGR 0525−66, the remnant of a star that had exploded as a supernova around 3000 BCE. It was in the Large Magellanic Cloud and the event was named GRB 790305b, the first-observed SGR megaflare.

=== Recent discoveries ===
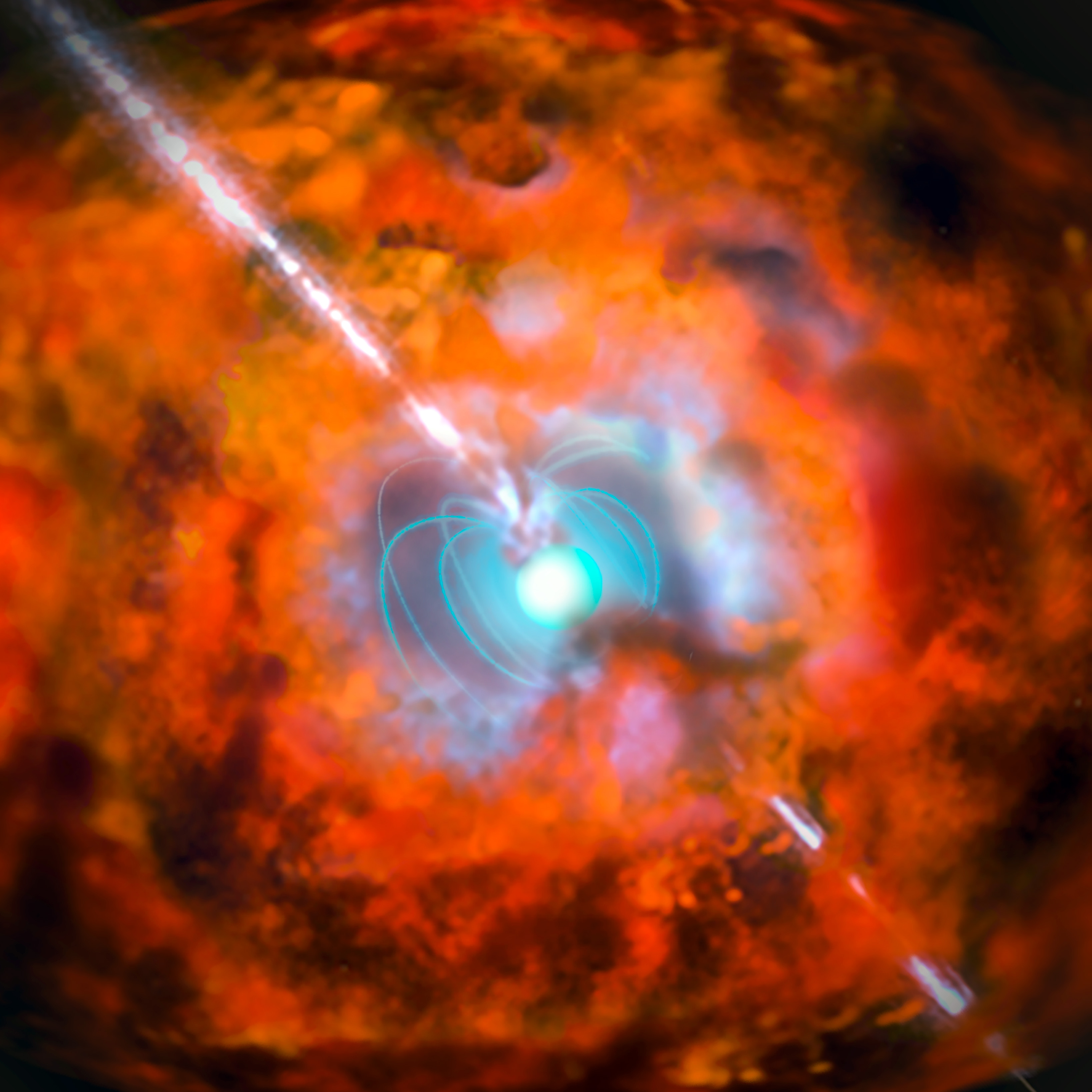
Artist's impression of a gamma-ray burst and supernova powered by a magnetar

On February 21, 2008, it was announced that NASA and researchers at McGill University had discovered a neutron star with the properties of a radio pulsar that emitted some magnetically powered bursts, like a magnetar. This suggests that magnetars are not merely a rare type of pulsar but may be a (possibly reversible) phase in the lives of some pulsars. On September 24, 2008, ESO announced what it ascertained was the first optically active magnetar-candidate yet discovered, using ESO's Very Large Telescope. The newly discovered object was designated SWIFT J195509+261406. On September 1, 2014, ESA released news of a magnetar close to supernova remnant Kesteven 79. Astronomers from Europe and China discovered this magnetar, named 3XMM J185246.6+003317, in 2013 by looking at images that had been taken in 2008 and 2009. In 2013, a magnetar PSR J1745−2900 was discovered, which orbits the black hole in the Sagittarius A* system. This object provides a valuable tool for studying the ionized interstellar medium toward the Galactic Center. In 2018, the temporary result of the merger of two neutron stars was determined to be a hypermassive magnetar, which shortly collapsed into a black hole.

In April 2020, a possible link between fast radio bursts (FRBs) and magnetars was suggested, based on observations of SGR 1935+2154, a likely magnetar located in the Milky Way galaxy.

== Known magnetars ==
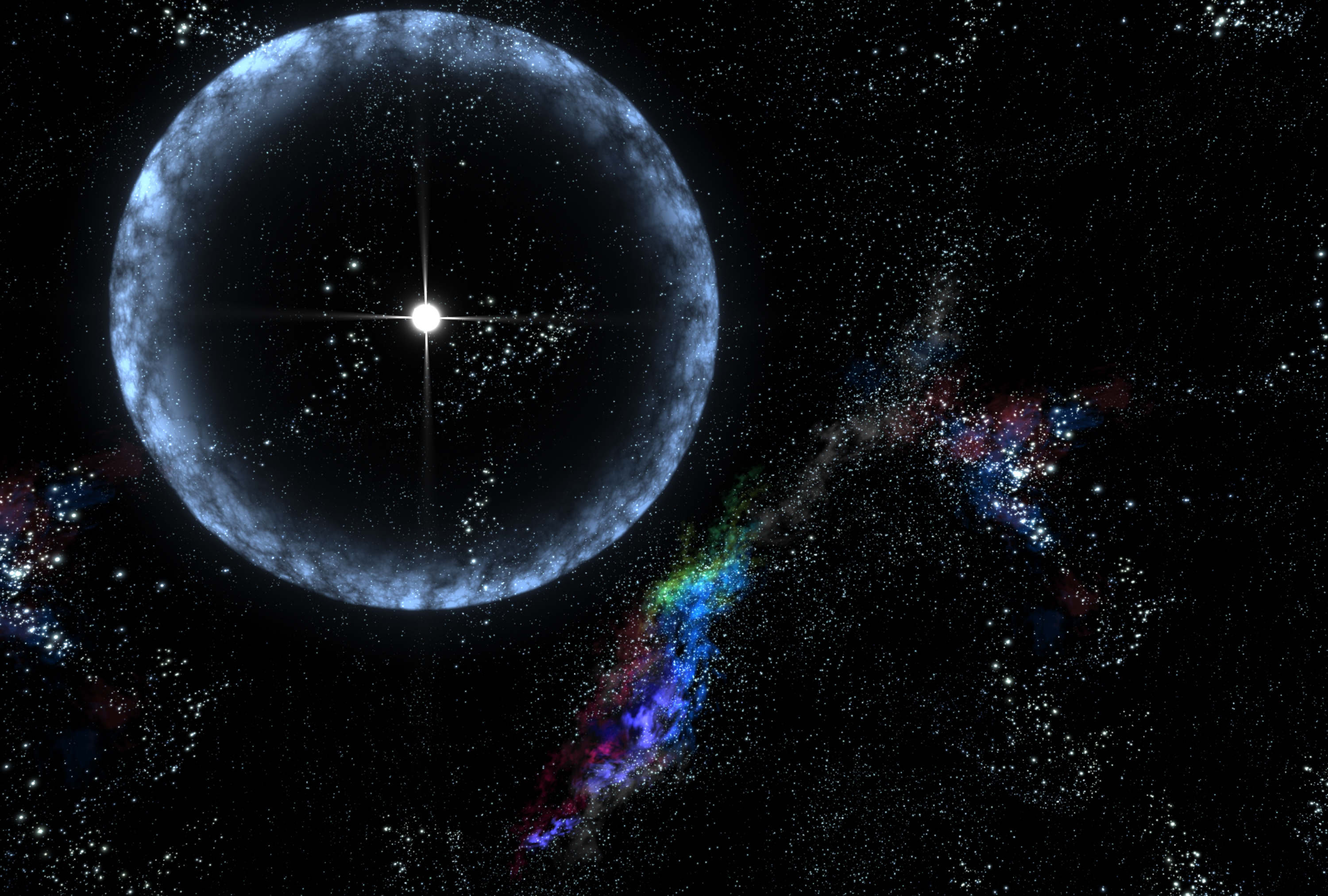
On 27 December 2004, a burst of gamma rays from SGR 1806−20 passed through the Solar System (artist's conception shown). The burst was so powerful that it had effects on Earth's atmosphere, at a range of about 50,000 light-years.

As of July 2021, 24 magnetars are known, with six more candidates awaiting confirmation. (30 to 31 as of July 19, 2026) A full listing is given in the McGill SGR/AXP Online Catalog. Examples of known magnetars include:

- SGR 0525−66, in the Large Magellanic Cloud, located about 163,000 light-years from Earth, was the first found (in 1979)
- SGR 1806−20, located 50,000 light-years from Earth on the far side of the Milky Way in the constellation of Sagittarius and the most magnetized object known.
- SGR 1900+14, located 20,000 light-years away in the constellation Aquila. After a long period of low emissions (significant bursts only in 1979 and 1993) it became active in May–August 1998, and a burst detected on August 27, 1998, was of sufficient power to force NEAR Shoemaker to shut down to prevent damage and to saturate instruments on BeppoSAX, WIND and RXTE. On May 29, 2008, NASA's Spitzer Space Telescope discovered a ring of matter around this magnetar. It is thought that this ring formed in the 1998 burst.
- SGR 0501+4516 was discovered on 22 August 2008.
- 1E 1048.1−5937, located 9,000 light-years away in the constellation Carina. The original star, from which the magnetar formed, had a mass 30 to 40 times that of the Sun.
- As of September 2008, ESO reports identification of an object which it has initially identified as a magnetar, SWIFT J195509+261406, originally identified by a gamma-ray burst (GRB 070610).
- CXO J164710.2-455216, located in the massive galactic cluster Westerlund 1, which formed from a star with a mass in excess of 40 solar masses.
- Swift J1822.3−1606 discovered on 14 July 2011 by Italian and Spanish researchers of CSIC at Madrid and Catalonia. This magnetar, contrary to predictions, has a low external magnetic field, and it might be as young as half a million years.
- 3XMM J185246.6+003317, discovered by an international team of astronomers, looking at data from ESA's XMM-Newton X-ray telescope.
- SGR 1935+2154 emitted a pair of luminous radio bursts on 28 April 2020. There was speculation that these may be galactic examples of fast radio bursts.
- Swift J1818.0-1607, X-ray burst detected in March 2020, is one of five known magnetars that are also radio pulsars. By the time of discovery, it may be only 240 years old.

Magnetar—SGR J1745-2900
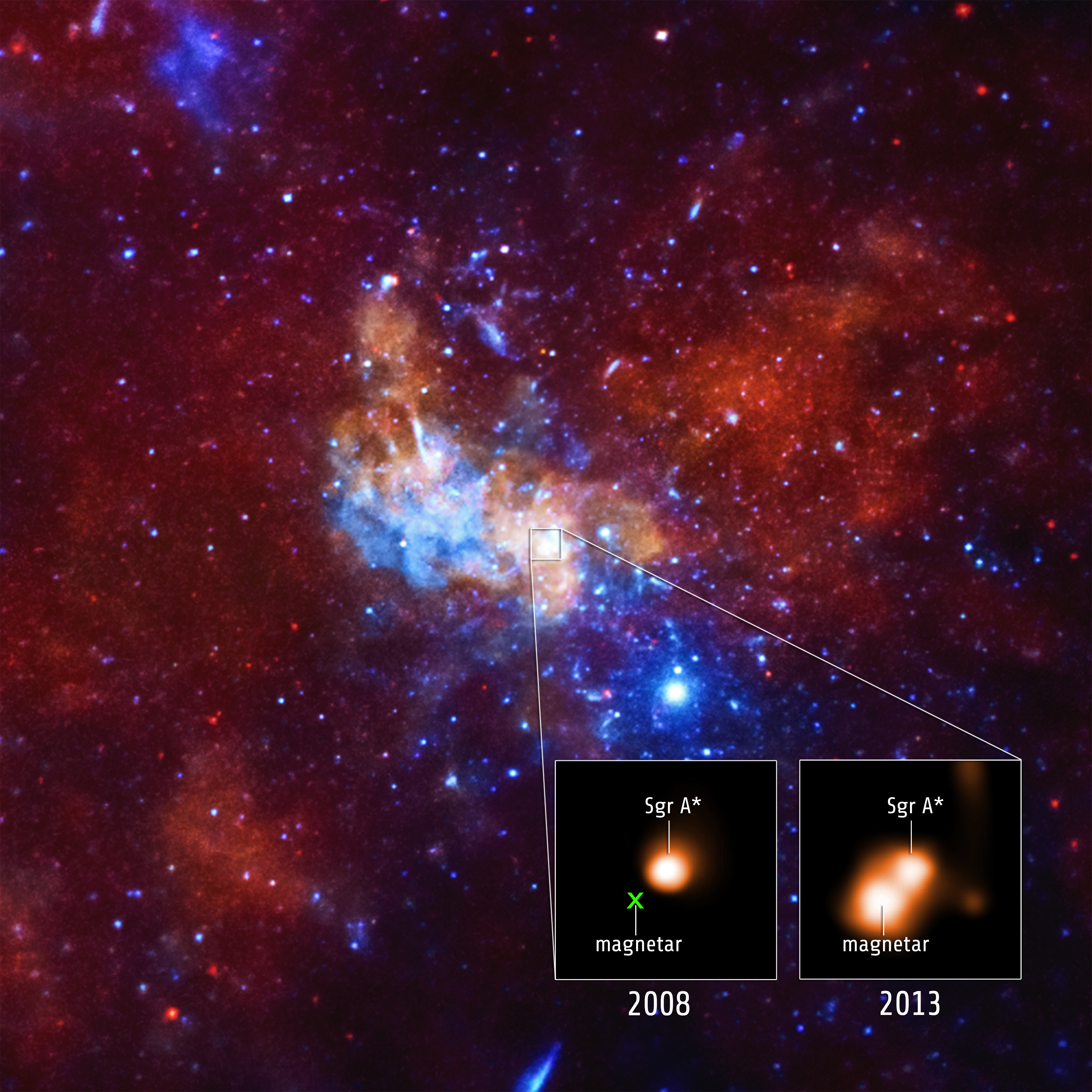
Magnetar found very close to the supermassive black hole, Sagittarius A*, at the center of the Milky Way galaxy

== Bright supernovae ==
Unusually bright supernovae are thought to result from the death of very large stars as pair-instability supernovae (or pulsational pair-instability supernovae). However, recent research by astronomers has postulated that energy released from newly formed magnetars into the surrounding supernova remnants may be responsible for some of the brightest supernovae, such as SN 2005ap and SN 2008es.
