= LMC N49 =

Supernova remnant in the constellation Dorado

LMC N49, The Brasil Nebula
Supernova remnant
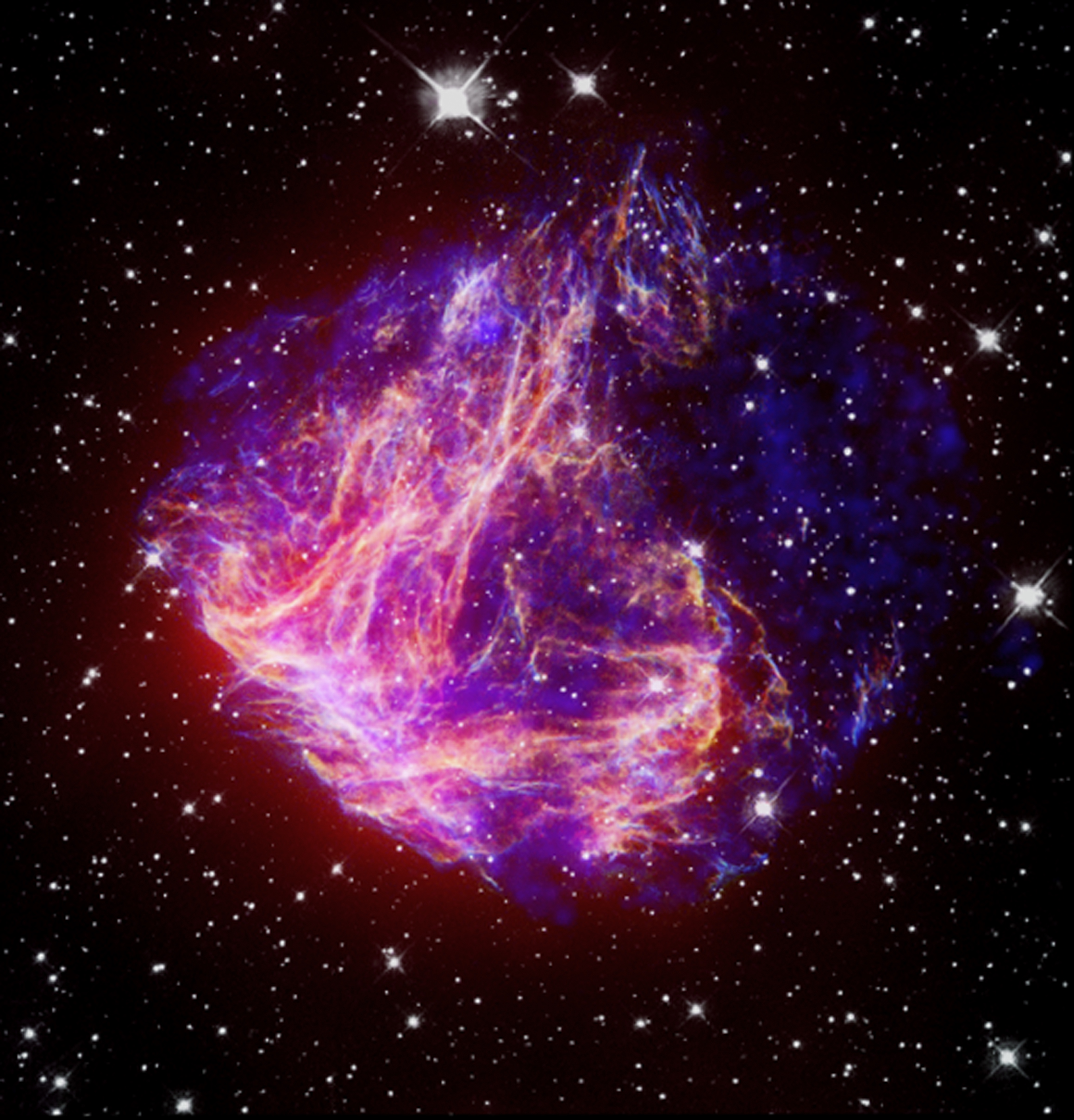

Observation data: J2000.0 epoch
- Right ascension: 05^{h} 26^{m} 01.00^{s}
- Declination: −66° 05′ 06.0″
- Distance: 160,000 ly
- Apparent magnitude (V): 12.71
- Constellation: Dorado

Physical characteristics
- Dimensions: 75 ly across
- Designations: LMC N49, PKS 0525-66, PKS B0525-661, PKS J0525-6604, SNR J052559-660453

N49 or LMC N49 (PKS 0525-66, PKS B0525-661, PKS J0525-6604, SNR J052559-660453), also known as Brasil Nebula, is a supernova remnant in the Large Magellanic Cloud.

On March 5, 1979, Venera 11, Venera 12, and seven other spacecraft detected a massive burst of Gamma-ray and X-ray emissions from LMC N49, confirmed to be particularly strong by the first X-ray telescope, the Einstein Observatory. The N49 supernova remnant is also known as the Brasil Nebula, due to its shape resembling the outline of Brazil in some images.
