= Gauss (unit) =

Unit of magnetic induction

gauss
- Unit system: Gaussian and emu-cgs
- Unit of: magnetic flux density (also known as magnetic induction, or the B-field, or magnetic field)
- Symbol: G or Gs
- Named after: Carl Friedrich Gauss

Conversions
1 G or Gs in ...	... is equal to ...
- SI derived units: 10^{−4} tesla (Note: The electromagnetic Gaussian and SI quantities correspond (symbol '≘') rather than being equal (symbol '='). (This relationship was exact, prior to 2019.))
- Gaussian base units: 1 cm^{−1/2}⋅g^{1/2}⋅s^{−1}
- esu-cgs: 1/c_{cgs} esu (Note: c_{cgs} = 2.99792458×10^{10} is the numeric part of the speed of light when expressed in cgs units.)

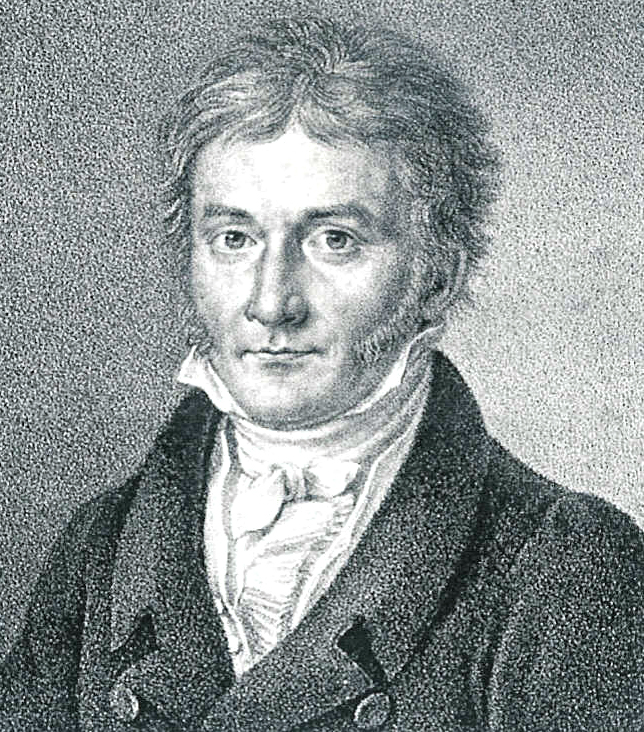
Carl Friedrich Gauß in 1828, aged 50 years old

The gauss (symbol: G, sometimes Gs) is a unit of measurement of magnetic flux density, B (also known as magnetic induction or magnetic field). The unit is part of the Gaussian system of units, which inherited it from the older centimetre–gram–second electromagnetic units (CGS-EMU) system. It was named after the German mathematician and physicist Carl Friedrich Gauss in 1936. One gauss is defined as one maxwell per square centimetre.

As the centimetre–gram–second system of units (cgs system) has been superseded by the International System of Units (SI), the use of the gauss has been deprecated by the standards bodies, but is still regularly used in various subfields of science, and preferred in astrophysics. The SI unit for magnetic flux density is the tesla (symbol T), which corresponds to 10,000gauss.

== Name, symbol, and metric prefixes ==
Although not a component of the International System of Units, the usage of the gauss generally follows the rules for SI units. Since the name is derived from a person's name, its symbol is the uppercase letter "G". When the unit is spelled out, it is written in lowercase ("gauss"), unless it begins a sentence. The gauss may be combined with metric prefixes, such as in milligauss, mG (or mGs), or kilogauss, kG (or kGs).

== Unit conversions ==
$$\begin{align}
1\,{\rm G} &= {\rm Mx}{\cdot}{\rm cm}^{-2} = \frac{\rm g}{{\rm Bi}{\cdot}{\rm s}^2}\\
&\text{ corresponds to } 10^{-4}\,{\rm T} = 10^{-4}\frac{\rm kg}{{\rm A}{\cdot}{\rm s^2}}
\end{align}$$

The gauss is the unit of magnetic flux density B in the system of Gaussian units and is equal to Mx/cm^{2} or g/Bi/s^{2}, while the oersted is the unit of H-field. One tesla (T) corresponds to 10^{4} gauss, and one ampere (A) per metre corresponds to 4π × 10^{−3} oersted, both with an uncertainty of 8 × 10^{−11}.

The 8th edition of the International System of Units specified that 1 gauss equalled 10^{−4} tesla. After the 2019 revision of the SI included a change to the definition of the base unit ampere, the 9th edition of the standard did not list any conversion factor between gauss and tesla.

== Typical values ==
- 10^{−9}–10^{−8} G – the magnetic field of the human brain
- 10^{−6}–10^{−3} G – the magnetic field of Galactic molecular clouds. Typical magnetic field strengths within the interstellar medium of the Milky Way are ~5 μG.
- 0.25–0.60 G – the Earth's magnetic field at its surface
- 4 G – near Jupiter's equator
- 25 G – the Earth's magnetic field in its core
- 50 G – a typical refrigerator magnet
- 100 G – an iron magnet
- 1500 G – within a sun spot
- 10000 to 13000 G – remanence of a neodymium-iron-boron (NIB) magnet
- 16000 to 22000 G – saturation of high permeability iron alloys used in transformers
- 3000–70000 G – a medical magnetic resonance imaging machine
- 10^{12}–10^{13} G – the surface of a neutron star
- 4 × 10^{13} G – the Schwinger limit
- 10^{14} G – the magnetic field of SGR J1745-2900, orbiting the supermassive black hole Sgr A* in the center of the Milky Way.
- 10^{15} G – the magnetic field of some newly created magnetars
- 10^{17} G – the upper limit to neutron star magnetism

== See also ==
- Centimetre–gram–second system of units
- Gaussian units
- Tesla (unit)
