= Soft gamma repeater =

Astronomical object which emits bursts of gamma or x-rays at irregular intervals

A soft gamma repeater (SGR) is an astronomical object which emits large bursts of gamma-rays and X-rays at irregular intervals. It is conjectured that they are a type of magnetar or, alternatively, neutron stars with fossil disks around them.

== History ==
On March 5, 1979 a powerful gamma-ray burst was noted. As a number of receivers at different locations in the Solar System saw the burst at slightly different times, its direction could be determined, and it was shown to originate from near a supernova remnant in the Large Magellanic Cloud.

Over time it became clear that this was not a normal gamma-ray burst. The photons were less energetic in the soft gamma-ray and hard X-ray range, and repeated bursts came from the same region.

Astronomer Chryssa Kouveliotou of the Universities Space Research Association (USRA) at NASA's Marshall Space Flight Center decided to test the hypothesis that soft gamma repeaters were magnetars. According to the hypothesis, the bursts would cause the object to slow down its rotation. In 1998, she made careful comparisons of the periodicity of soft gamma repeater SGR 1806-20. The period had increased by 0.008 seconds since 1993, and she calculated that this would be explained by a magnetar with a magnetic-field strength of 8×10^{10} teslas (8×10^{14} gauss). This was enough to convince the international astronomical community that soft gamma repeaters are indeed magnetars.

An unusually spectacular soft gamma repeater burst was SGR 1900+14 observed on August 27, 1998. Despite the large distance to this SGR, estimated at 20,000 light years, the burst had large effects on the Earth's atmosphere. The atoms in the ionosphere, which are usually ionized by the Sun's radiation by day and recombine to neutral atoms by night, were ionized at nighttime at levels not much lower than the normal daytime level. The Rossi X-Ray Timing Explorer (RXTE), an X-ray satellite, received its strongest signal from this burst at this time, even though it was directed at a different part of the sky, and should normally have been shielded from the radiation.

== List of SGR ==
Known soft gamma repeaters include:

Object	Discovery	Notes
SGR 0525−66	1979	
SGR 1806−20	1979/1986	The most powerful soft gamma repeater burst yet recorded was observed coming from this object on December 27, 2004.
SGR 1900+14	1979/1986	20,000 lyr away; powerful, affected the Earth's atmosphere.
SGR 1627−41	1998	
SGR J1550−5418	2008	Rotates once every 2.07 seconds, holds the record for the fastest-spinning magnetar.
SGR 0501+4516	2008	15,000 lyr away; X-ray outburst detected by Swift satellite 22 August 2008.
SGR J1745−2900	2013	A soft gamma repeater orbiting the black hole in Sagittarius A*.
SGR 1935+2154	2014	30,000 lyr away; First ever detected fast radio burst inside the Milky Way, and the first ever to be linked to a known source.

The numbers give the position in the sky, for example, SGR 0525-66 has a right ascension of 5h25m and a declination of −66°. The date of discovery sometimes appears in a format such as 1979/1986 to refer to the year the object was discovered, in addition to the year soft gamma repeaters were recognized as a separate class of objects rather than "normal" gamma-ray bursts.
