= History of gamma-ray burst research =

The history of gamma-ray burst research began with the serendipitous detection of a gamma-ray burst (GRB) on July 2, 1967, by the U.S. Vela satellites. After these satellites detected fifteen other GRBs, Ray Klebesadel of the Los Alamos National Laboratory published the first paper on the subject, Observations of Gamma-Ray Bursts of Cosmic Origin. Hundreds of models were developed in an attempt to explain GRB origins.

== Discovery ==
Gamma-ray bursts were discovered in the late 1960s by the U.S. Vela nuclear test detection satellites. The Velas were built to detect gamma radiation pulses emitted by nuclear weapon tests in space. The United States suspected that the USSR might attempt to conduct secret nuclear tests after signing the Nuclear Test Ban Treaty in 1963. While most satellites orbited at about 500 miles above Earth's surface, the Vela satellites orbited at an altitude of 65,000 miles. At this height, the satellites orbited above the Van Allen radiation belt, which reduced the noise in the sensors. The extra height also meant that the satellites could detect explosions behind the Moon, a location where the United States government suspected the Soviet Union would try to conceal nuclear weapon tests. The Vela system generally had four satellites operational at any given time such that a gamma-ray signal could be detected at multiple locations. This made it possible to localize the source of the signal to a relatively compact region of space. While these characteristics were incorporated into the Vela system to improve the detection of nuclear weapons, these same characteristics were what made the satellites capable of detecting gamma-ray bursts.

On July 2, 1967, at 14:19 UTC, the Vela 4 and Vela 3 satellites detected a flash of gamma radiation that were unlike any known nuclear weapons signatures. Nuclear bombs produce a very brief, intense burst of gamma rays less than one millionth of a second. The radiation then steadily fades as the unstable nuclei decay. The signal detected by the Vela satellites had neither the intense initial flash nor the gradual fading, but instead there were two distinct peaks in the light curve. Solar flares and new supernovas were the two other possible explanations for the event, but neither had occurred on that day. Unclear on what had happened, but not considering the matter particularly urgent, the team at the Los Alamos Scientific Laboratory, led by Ray Klebesadel, filed the data away for later investigation.

Vela 5 was launched on May 23, 1969. Because the sensitivity and time resolution on these satellites were significantly more accurate than the instruments on Vela 4, the Los Alamos team expected these new satellites to detect more gamma-ray bursts. Despite an enormous amount of background signals picked up by the new detectors, the research team found twelve events which had not coincided with any solar flares or supernovas. Some of the new detections also showed the same double-peak pattern that had been observed by Vela 4.

Although their instrumentation offered no improvement over those on Vela 5, the Vela 6 satellites were launched on April 8, 1970, with the intention of determining the direction from which the gamma rays were arriving. The orbits for the Vela 6 satellites were chosen to be as far away from Vela 5 as possible, generally on the order of 10000 kilometers apart. This separation meant that, despite gamma rays traveling at the speed of light, a signal would be detected at slightly different times by different satellites. By analyzing the arrival times, Klebesadel and his team successfully traced sixteen gamma-ray bursts. The random distribution of bursts across the sky made it clear that the bursts were not coming from the Sun, Moon, or other planets in the Solar System.

In 1973, Ray Klebesadel, Roy Olson, and Ian Strong of the University of California Los Alamos Scientific Laboratory published Observations of Gamma-Ray Bursts of Cosmic Origin, identifying a cosmic source for the previously unexplained observations of gamma-rays. Shortly thereafter, Klebesadel presented his findings at the 140th meeting of the American Astronomical Society. Although he was interviewed only by The National Enquirer, news of the discovery quickly spread through the scientific community. Between 1973 and 2001 more than 5300 papers were published on GRBs.

== Early research missions ==
Shortly after the discovery of gamma-ray bursts, a general consensus arose within the astronomical community that in order to determine what caused them, they would have to be identified with astronomical objects at other wavelengths, particularly visible light, as this approach had been successfully applied to the fields of radio X-ray astronomy. This method would require far more accurate positions of several gamma-ray bursts than the Vela system could provide. Greater accuracy required the detectors to be spaced farther apart. Instead of launching satellites only into Earth's orbit, it was deemed necessary to spread the detectors throughout the Solar System.

By the end of 1978, the first Inter-Planetary Network (IPN) had been completed. In addition to the Vela satellites, the IPN included 5 new space probes: the Soviet Prognoz 7, in orbit around the Earth, the German Helios 2, in elliptical orbit around the Sun, and NASA's Pioneer Venus Orbiter, Venera 11, and Venera 12, each of which orbited Venus. The research team at the Russian Institute for Space Research in Moscow, led by Kevin Hurley, was able to use the data collected by the IPN to accurately determine the position of gamma-ray bursts with an accuracy of a few minutes of arc. However, even when using the most powerful telescopes available, nothing of interest could be found within the determined regions.

To explain the existence of gamma-ray bursts, many speculative theories were advanced, most of which posited nearby galactic sources. Little progress was made, however, until the 1991 launch of the Compton Gamma Ray Observatory and its Burst and Transient Source Explorer (BATSE) instrument, an extremely sensitive gamma-ray detector. This instrument provided crucial data indicating that GRBs are isotropic (not biased towards any particular direction in space, such as toward the galactic plane or the Galactic Center). Because the Milky Way galaxy has a very flat structure, if gamma-ray bursts were to originate from within the Milky Way, they would not be distributed isotropically across the sky, but instead concentrated in the plane of the Milky Way. Although the luminosity of the bursts suggested that they had to be originating within the Milky Way, the distribution provided very strong evidence to the contrary.

BATSE data also showed that GRBs fall into two distinct categories: short-duration, hard-spectrum bursts ("short bursts"), and long-duration, soft-spectrum bursts ("long bursts"). Short bursts are typically less than two seconds in duration and are dominated by higher-energy photons; long bursts are typically more than two seconds in duration and dominated by lower-energy photons. The separation is not absolute and the populations overlap observationally, but the distinction suggests two different classes of progenitors. However, some believe there is a third type of GRBs. The three kinds of GRBs are hypothesized to reflect three different origins: mergers of neutron star systems, mergers between white dwarfs and neutron stars, and the collapse of massive stars.

For decades after the discovery of GRBs, astronomers searched for a counterpart: any astronomical object in positional coincidence with a recently observed burst. Astronomers considered many distinct objects, including white dwarfs, pulsars, supernovae, globular clusters, quasars, Seyfert galaxies, and BL Lac objects. Researchers specifically looked for objects with unusual properties which might relate to gamma-ray bursts: high proper motion, polarization, orbital brightness modulation, fast time scale flickering, extreme colors, emission lines, or an unusual shape. From the discovery of GRBs through the 1980s, GRB 790305b (Note: GRBs are named after the date on which they are discovered: the first two digits being the year, followed by the two-digit month and two-digit day, then a letter corresponding to the order upon which it was detected (A for first of that day, B for second, and so on). Before 2010 this was only signified if two or more GRBs were detected on a given day.) was the only event to have been identified with a candidate source object: nebula N49 in the Large Magellanic Cloud. All other attempts failed due to poor resolution of the available detectors. The best hope seemed to lie in finding a fainter, fading, longer wavelength emission after the burst itself, the "afterglow" of a GRB.

As early as 1980, a research group headed by Livio Scarsi at the University of Rome began working on Satellite per Astronomia X, an X-ray astronomy research satellite. The project developed into a collaboration between the Italian Space Agency and the Netherlands Agency for Aerospace Programmes. Though the satellite was originally intended to serve the sole purpose of studying X-rays, Enrico Costa of the Istituto di Astrofisica Spaziale suggested that the satellite's four protective shields could easily serve as gamma-ray burst detectors. After 10 years of delays and a final cost of approximately $350 million, the satellite, renamed BeppoSAX in honor of Giuseppe Occhialini, was launched on April 30, 1996.

In 1983, a team composed of Stan Woosley, Don Lamb, Ed Fenimore, Kevin Hurley, and George Ricker began discussing plans for a new GRB research satellite, the High Energy Transient Explorer (HETE). Although many satellites were already providing data on GRBs, HETE would be the first satellite devoted entirely to GRB research. The goal was for HETE to be able to localize gamma-ray bursts with much greater accuracy than the BATSE detectors. The team submitted a proposal to NASA in 1986 under which the satellite would be equipped with four gamma ray detectors, an X-ray camera, and four electronic cameras for detecting visible and ultraviolet light. The project was to cost $14.5 million, and the launch was originally planned for the summer of 1994. The Pegasus XL rocket, which launched HETE on November 4, 1996, did not release its two satellites, so the HETE and SAC-B, an Argentinian research satellite also on board, missions were attached to the rocket and unable to direct their solar panels towards the sun, and within one day of the launch, all radio contact with the satellites was lost. The eventual successor to the mission, HETE 2, was successfully launched on 9 October 2000. It observed its first GRB on 13 February 2001.

== Observations and analysis ==
BeppoSAX spacecraft detected its first gamma-ray burst GRB960720 on July 20, 1996 from an X-ray burst in one of the two Wide Field Cameras (WFCs), but it was only discovered in the data six weeks later, by a Dutch duty scientist systematically checking WFC-bursts coinciding in time with BATSE-triggers from the same direction. Follow-up radio observations with the Very Large Array by Dale Frail did not find an afterglow at the derived position from the deconvolved data, but a routine procedure for finding gamma-ray bursts with BeppoSAX could be established. This led to the detection of a gamma-ray burst on January 11, 1997, and one of its Wide Field Cameras also detected X-rays at the same moment coinciding with a BATSE-trigger. John Heise, Dutch project scientist for BeppoSAX's WFCs, quickly deconvolved the data from the WFCs using software by Jean in 't Zand, a Dutch former gamma-ray spectroscopist at the Goddard Space Flight Center, and in less than 24 hours, produced a sky position with an accuracy of about 10 arcminutes. Although this level of accuracy had already been surpassed by the interplanetary networks, they were unable to produce the data as quickly as Heise could. In the following days, Dale Frail, working with the Very Large Array, detected a single fading radio source within the error box, a BL Lac object. An article was written for Nature stating that this event proved that GRBs originated from active galaxies. However, Jean in 't Zand rewrote the WFC deconvolution software to produce a position with an accuracy of 3 arcminutes, and the BL Lac object was no longer within the reduced error box. Despite BeppoSAX having observed both X-rays and a GRB and the position being known within that same day, the source of the burst was not identified.

Success for the BeppoSAX team came in February 1997, less than one year after it had been launched. A BeppoSAX WFC detected a gamma-ray burst (GRB 970228), and when the X-ray camera onboard BeppoSAX was pointed towards the direction from which the burst had originated, it detected a fading X-ray emission. Ground-based telescopes later identified a fading optical counterpart as well. The location of this event having been identified, once the GRB faded, deep imaging was able to identify a faint, very distant host galaxy in the GRB's location. Within only a few weeks the long controversy about the distance scale ended: GRBs were extragalactic events originating inside faint galaxies at enormous distances. (Note: For more on galaxies hosting GRBs, see the GHostS database http://www.grbhosts.org) By finally establishing the distance scale, characterizing the environments in which GRBs occur, and providing a new window on GRBs both observationally and theoretically, this discovery revolutionized the study of GRBs.

Two major breakthroughs also occurred with the next event registered by BeppoSAX, GRB 970508. This event was localized within 4 hours of its discovery, allowing research teams to begin making observations much sooner than any previous burst. By comparing photographs of the error box taken on May 8 and May 9 (the day of the event and the day after), one object was found to have increased in brightness. Between May 10 and May, Charles Steidel recorded the spectrum of the variable object from the W. M. Keck Observatory. Mark Metzger analyzed the spectrum and determined a redshift of z=0.835, placing the burst at a distance of roughly 6 billion light years. This was the first accurate determination of the distance to a GRB, and it further proved that GRBs occur in extremely distant galaxies.

Prior to the localization of GRB 970228, opinions differed as to whether or not GRBs would emit detectable radio waves. Bohdan Paczyński and James Rhoads published an article in 1993 predicting radio afterglows, but Martin Rees and Peter Mészáros concluded that, due to the vast distances between GRBs and the Earth, any radio waves produced would be too weak to be detected. Although GRB 970228 was accompanied by an optical afterglow, neither the Very Large Array nor the Westerbork Synthesis Radio Telescope were able to detect a radio afterglow. However, five days after GRB 970508, Dale Frail, working with the Very Large Array in New Mexico, observed radio waves from the afterglow at wavelengths of 3.5 cm, 6 cm, and 21 cm. The total luminosity varied widely from hour to hour, but not simultaneously in all wavelengths. Jeremy Goodman of Princeton University explained the erratic fluctuations as being the result of scintillation caused by vibrations in the Earth's atmosphere, which no longer occurs when the source has an apparent size larger than 3 micro-arcseconds. After several weeks, the luminosity fluctuations had dissipated. Using this piece of information and the distance to the event, it was determined that the source of radio waves had expanded almost at the speed of light. Never before had accurate information been obtained regarding the physical characteristics of a gamma-ray burst explosion.

Also, because GRB 970508 was observed at many different wavelengths, it was possible to form a very complete spectrum for the event. Ralph Wijers and Titus Galama attempted to calculate various physical properties of the burst, including the total amount of energy in the burst and the density of the surrounding medium. Using an extensive system of equations, they were able to compute these values as 3×10^{52} ergs and 30,000 particles per cubic meter, respectively. Although the observation data was not accurate enough for their results to be considered particularly reliable, Wijers and Galama did show that, in principle, it would be possible to determine the physical characters of GRBs based on their spectra.

The next burst to have its redshift calculated was GRB 971214 with a redshift of 3.42, a distance of roughly 12 billion lightyears from Earth. Using the redshift and the accurate brightness measurements made by both BATSE and BeppoSAX, Shrinivas Kulkarni, who had recorded the redshift at the W. M. Keck Observatory, calculated the amount of energy released by the burst in half a minute to be 3×10^{53} ergs, several hundred times more energy than is released by the Sun in 10 billion years. The burst was proclaimed to be the most energetic explosion to have ever occurred since the Big Bang, earning it the nickname Big Bang 2. This explosion presented a dilemma for GRB theoreticians: either this burst produced more energy than could possibly be explained by any of the existing models, or the burst did not emit energy in all directions, but instead in very narrow beams which happened to have been pointing directly at Earth. While the beaming explanation would reduce the total energy output to a very small fraction of Kulkarni's calculation, it also implies that for every burst observed on Earth, several hundred occur which are not observed because their beams are not pointed towards Earth.

In November 2019, astronomers reported a notable gamma ray burst explosion, named GRB 190114C, initially detected in January 2019, that, so far, has been determined to have had the highest energy, 1 Tera electron volts (Tev), ever observed for such a cosmic event.

== Current missions ==
Konus-Wind is flown on board Wind spacecraft. It was launched on 1 November 1994. Experiment consists of two identical gamma ray spectrometers mounted on opposite sites of the spacecraft so all sky is observed.

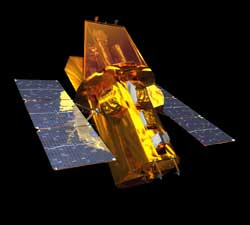
Swift Spacecraft

INTEGRAL, the European Space Agency's International Gamma-Ray Astrophysics Laboratory, was launched on October 17, 2002. It is the first observatory capable simultaneously observing objects at gamma ray, X-ray, and visible wavelengths.

NASA's Swift satellite launched in November 2004. It combines a sensitive gamma-ray detector with the ability to point on-board X-ray and optical telescopes towards the direction of a new burst in less than one minute after the burst is detected. Swift's discoveries include the first observations of short burst afterglows and vast amounts of data on the behavior of GRB afterglows at early stages during their evolution, even before the GRB's gamma-ray emission has stopped. The mission has also discovered large X-ray flares appearing within minutes to days after the end of the GRB.

On June 11, 2008 NASA's Gamma-ray Large Area Space Telescope (GLAST), later renamed the Fermi Gamma-ray Space Telescope, was launched. The mission objectives include "crack[ing] the mysteries of the stupendously powerful explosions known as gamma-ray bursts."

Another gamma-ray burst observation mission is AGILE. Discoveries of GRBs are made as they are detected via the Gamma-ray Burst Coordinates Network so that researchers may promptly focus their instruments on the source of the burst to observe the afterglows.

== Bibliography ==
- Vigliano, A.; Longo, F. (2024). "Gamma-ray Bursts: 50 Years and Counting!". Universe. 10 (2): 57. Bibcode:2024Univ...10...57V. doi:10.3390/universe10020057. hdl:11368/3075305. 57.
- Chattopadhyay, T.; et al. (2007). "Statistical Evidence for Three Classes of Gamma-Ray Bursts". Astrophysical Journal. 667 (2): 1017–1023. arXiv:0705.4020. Bibcode:2007ApJ...667.1017C. doi:10.1086/520317. S2CID 14923248.
- Fishman, C. J.; Meegan, C. A. (1995). "Gamma-Ray Bursts". Annual Review of Astronomy and Astrophysics. 33 (1): 415 458. Bibcode:1995ARA&A..33..415F. doi:10.1146/annurev.aa.33.090195.002215.
- Frontera, F.; Piro, L. (1998). Proceedings of Gamma-Ray Bursts in the Afterglow Era. Astronomy and Astrophysics Supplement Series. Archived from the original on 2006-08-08.
- Gehrels, N.; et al. (2004). "The Swift Gamma-Ray Burst Mission". Astrophysical Journal. 611 (2): 1005–1020. arXiv:astro-ph/0405233. Bibcode:2004ApJ...611.1005G. doi:10.1086/422091. S2CID 17871491.
- Hakkila, J.; et al. (2003). "How Sample Completeness Affects Gamma-Ray Burst Classification". Astrophysical Journal. 582 (1): 320–329. arXiv:astro-ph/0209073. Bibcode:2003ApJ...582..320H. doi:10.1086/344568. S2CID 14606496.
- Horvath, I. (1998). "A Third Class of Gamma-Ray Bursts?". Astrophysical Journal. 508 (2): 757–759. arXiv:astro-ph/9803077. Bibcode:1998ApJ...508..757H. doi:10.1086/306416. S2CID 119395213.
- Horvath, I.; et al. (2006). "A new definition of the intermediate group of gamma-ray bursts". Astronomy and Astrophysics. 447 (1): 23–30. arXiv:astro-ph/0509909. Bibcode:2006A&A...447...23H. doi:10.1051/0004-6361:20041129. S2CID 15216537.
- Hurley, K. (2003). "A Gamma-Ray Burst Bibliography, 1973-2001" (PDF). In G. R. Ricker; R. K. Vanderspek (eds.). Gamma-Ray Burst and Afterglow Astronomy, 2001: A Workshop Celebrating the First Year of the HETE Mission. American Institute of Physics. pp. 153–155. ISBN 0-7354-0122-5.
- Katz, Johnathan I. (2002). The Biggest Bangs. Oxford University Press. ISBN 0-19-514570-4.
- Klebesadel, R.; et al. (1973). "Observations of Gamma-Ray Bursts of Cosmic Origin". Astrophysical Journal. 182: L85. Bibcode:1973ApJ...182L..85K. doi:10.1086/181225.
- Kouveliotou, C.; et al. (1993). "Identification of two classes of gamma-ray bursts". Astrophysical Journal. 413: L101. Bibcode:1993ApJ...413L.101K. doi:10.1086/186969.
- Liang, Edison P.; Vahé Petrosian, eds. (1986). AIP Conference Proceedings No. 141. New York: American Institute of Physics. ISBN 0-88318-340-4.
- Meegan, C. A.; et al. (1992). "Spatial distribution of gamma-ray bursts observed by BATSE". Nature. 355 (6356): 143–145. Bibcode:1992Natur.355..143M. doi:10.1038/355143a0. S2CID 4301714.
- Mukherjee, S.; et al. (1998). "Three Types of Gamma-Ray Bursts". Astrophysical Journal. 508 (1): 314–327. arXiv:astro-ph/9802085. Bibcode:1998ApJ...508..314M. doi:10.1086/306386. S2CID 17983432.
- Paczyński, Bohdan (1999). "Gamma-Ray Burst–Supernova relation". In M. Livio; N. Panagia; K. Sahu (eds.). Supernovae and Gamma-Ray Bursts: The Greatest Explosions Since the Big Bang. Space Telescope Science Institute. pp. 1–8. ISBN 0-521-79141-3.
- Schilling, Govert (2002). Flash! The hunt for the biggest explosions in the universe. Cambridge: Cambridge University Press. ISBN 0-521-80053-6.
- van Paradijs, J.; et al. (1997). "Transient optical emission from the error box of the gamma-ray burst of 28 February 1997" (PDF). Nature. 386 (6626): 686–689. Bibcode:1997Natur.386..686V. doi:10.1038/386686a0. S2CID 4248753.
- Aptekar, R.; et al. (1995). "Konus-W gamma-ray burst experiment for the GSS Wind spacecraft". Space Science Reviews. 71 (1–4): 265–272. Bibcode:1995SSRv...71..265A. doi:10.1007/BF00751332. S2CID 121420345.
