= GRB 970228 =

Gamma-ray burst detected on 28 Feb 1997, the first for which an afterglow was observed

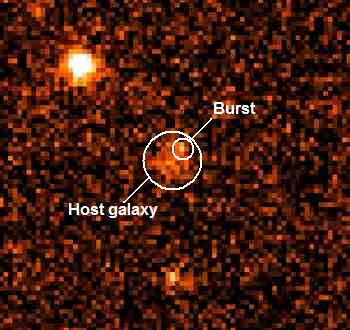
- Event type: Gamma-ray burst
- Constellation: Orion
- Right ascension: 05^{h} 01^{m} 46.7^{s}
- Declination: +11° 46′ 53.0″
- Epoch: J2000
- Distance: 8,123,000,000 ly (2.491×10^{9} pc)
- Redshift: 0.695, 0.695
- Total energy output: 5.2×10^{44} J
- Other designations: GRB 970228
- Related media on Commons

GRB 970228 was the first gamma-ray burst (GRB) for which an afterglow was observed. It was detected on 28 February 1997 at 02:58 UTC. Since 1993, physicists had predicted GRBs to be followed by a lower-energy afterglow (in wavelengths such as radio waves, x-rays, and even visible light), but until this event, GRBs had only been observed in highly luminous bursts of high-energy gamma rays (the most energetic form of electromagnetic radiation); this resulted in large positional uncertainties which left their nature very unclear.

The burst had multiple peaks in its light curve and lasted approximately 80 seconds. Peculiarities in the light curve of GRB 970228 suggested that a supernova may have occurred as well. The position of the burst coincided with a galaxy about 8.1 billion light-years away (a redshift of z = 0.695), providing early evidence that GRBs occur well beyond the Milky Way; this was proven decisively two months later with a subsequent burst GRB 970508.

== Observations ==
A gamma-ray burst (GRB) is a highly luminous flash of gamma rays, the most energetic form of electromagnetic radiation. GRBs were first detected in 1967 by the Vela satellites, a series of spacecraft designed to detect nuclear explosions.

GRB 970228 was detected on 28 February 1997 at 02:58 UTC by the Gamma-Ray Burst Monitor (GRBM) and one of the Wide Field Cameras (WFCs) on board BeppoSAX, an Italian–Dutch satellite originally designed to study X-rays. The burst lasted around 80 seconds and had multiple peaks in its light curve. Gamma-ray bursts have very diverse time profiles, and it is not fully understood why some bursts have multiple peaks and some have only one. One possible explanation is that multiple peaks are formed when the source of the gamma-ray burst undergoes precession. Within a few hours, the BeppoSAX team used the X-ray detection to determine the burst's position with an error box—a small area around the specific position to account for the error in the position—of 3 arcminutes. The burst was also detected by the Ulysses space probe.

About one and nine days later, optical images of the error box were taken with the William Herschel Telescope on La Palma; comparison of the images revealed a fading point source located at a right ascension of 05^{h} 01^{m} 46.7^{s} and a declination of +11° 46′ 53.0″, providing the first arcsecond-accuracy localization of any Gamma-ray burst.

Later images after the point source faded revealed a faint galaxy at almost the same position, the presumed host galaxy of the burst; a chance position coincidence was unlikely but possible, so the cosmological origin of GRBs was not conclusive until observations of GRB 970508 about two months later.

== Afterglow ==
In 1993, Bohdan Paczyński and James E. Rhoads published an article arguing that, regardless of the type of explosion that causes GRBs, the extreme energetics of GRBs meant that matter from the host body must be ejected at relativistic speeds during the explosion. They predicted that the interaction between the ejecta and interstellar matter would create a shock front. Should this shock front occur in a magnetic field, accelerated electrons in it would emit long-lasting synchrotron radiation in the radio frequencies, a phenomenon that would later be referred to as a radio afterglow. Jonathan Katz later concluded that this lower-energy emission would not be limited to radio waves, but should range in frequency from radio waves to x-rays, including visible light.

The Narrow Field Instruments on board BeppoSAX began making observations of the GRB 970228's position within eight hours of its detection. A transient x-ray source was detected which faded with a power-law slope in the days following the burst. This x-ray afterglow was the first GRB afterglow ever detected. Power-law decays have since been recognized as a common feature in GRB afterglows, although most afterglows decay at differing rates during different phases of their lifetimes.

Optical images were taken of GRB 970228's position on 1 and 8 March using the William Herschel Telescope and the Isaac Newton Telescope. Comparison of the images revealed an object which had decreased in luminosity in both visible light and infrared light. This was the burst's optical afterglow. Deeper follow-up observations using the New Technology Telescope showed that the afterglow coincided with a distant, small galaxy: the first evidence of the extragalactic, cosmological nature of Gamma-ray bursts. After the gamma-ray bursts itself had faded away, very deep observations taken with the Keck telescopes showed the underlying galaxy to have a redshift of 0.695. The predicted radio afterglow was never detected for this burst. At the time of this burst's discovery, GRBs were believed to emit radiation isotropically. The afterglows from this burst and several others—such as GRB 970508 and GRB 971214—provided early evidence that GRBs emit radiation in collimated jets, a characteristic which lowers the total energy output of a burst by several orders of magnitude.

== Supernova relation ==
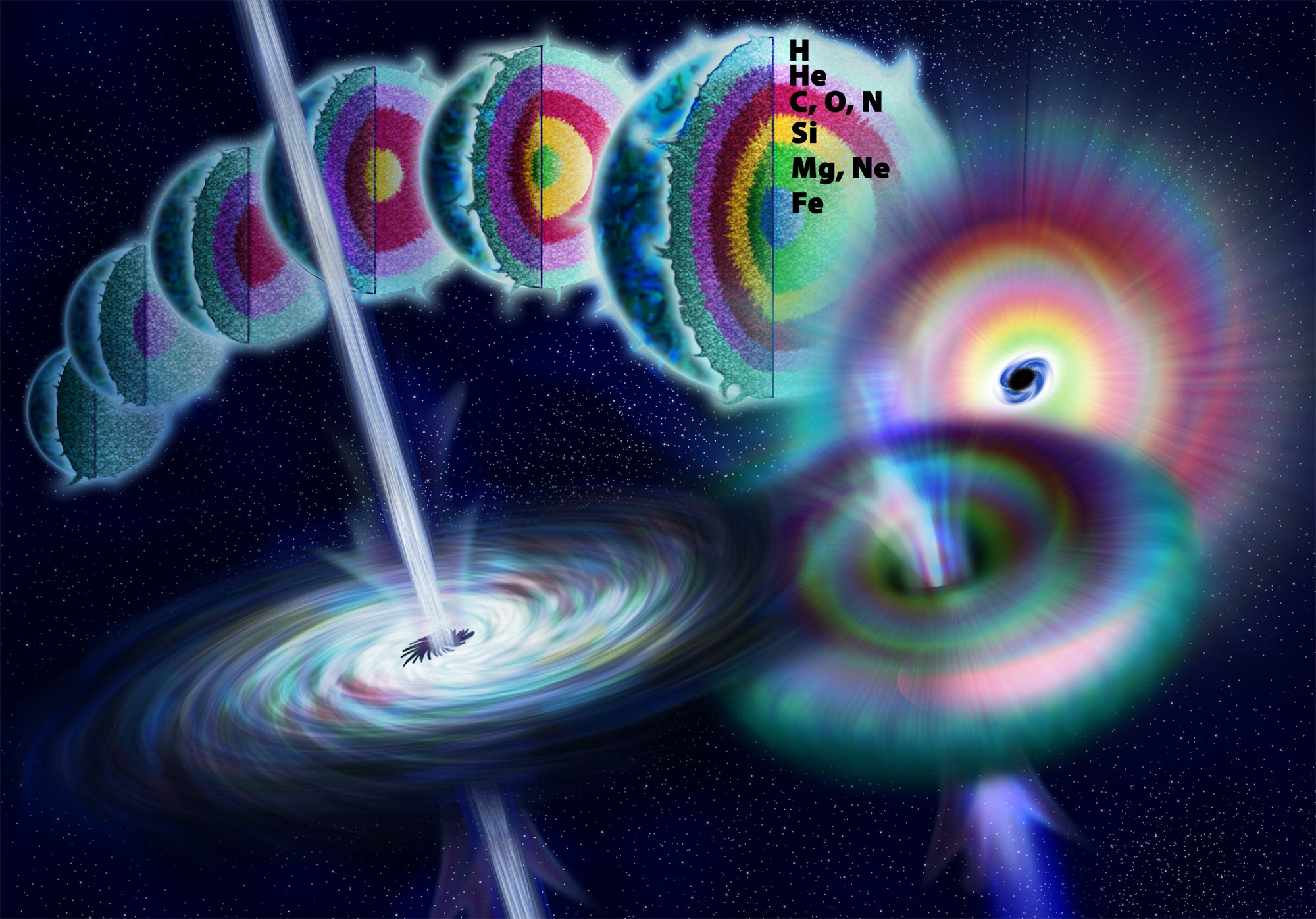
Artist's illustration showing the life of a massive star as it goes supernova, collapses into a black hole, and emits a gamma-ray burst along its axis of rotation Credit: Nicolle Rager Fuller/NSF

Daniel Reichart of the University of Chicago and Titus Galama of the University of Amsterdam independently analyzed GRB 970228's optical light curve, both concluding that the host object may have undergone a supernova explosion several weeks before the gamma-ray burst occurred.

Galama analyzed the light curve of the burst and found that its luminosity decayed at different rates at different times. The luminosity decayed more slowly between March 6 and April 7 than it did before and after these dates. Galama concluded that the earlier light curve had been dominated by the burst itself, whereas the later light curve was produced by the underlying Type Ic supernova. Reichart noted that the late afterglow was redder than the early afterglow, an observation which conflicted with the then-preferred relativistic fireball model for the gamma-ray burst emission mechanism. He also observed that the only GRB with a similar temporal profile was GRB 980326, for which a supernova relation had already been proposed by Joshua Bloom.

An alternative explanation for the light curves of GRB 970228 and GRB 980326 involved dust echoes. Although GRB 980326 did not provide enough information to definitively rule out this explanation, Reichart showed that the light curve of GRB 970228 could only have been caused by a supernova. Definitive evidence linking gamma-ray bursts and supernovae was eventually found in the spectrum of GRB 020813 and the afterglow of GRB 030329. However, supernova-like features only become apparent in the weeks following a burst, leaving the possibility that very early luminosity variations could be explained by dust echoes.

== Host galaxy ==
During the night between 12 and 13 March, Jorge Melnick made observations of the region with the New Technology Telescope. He discovered a faint nebular patch at the burst's position, almost certainly a distant galaxy. Although there was a remote chance that the burst and this galaxy were unrelated, their positional coincidence provided strong evidence that GRBs occur in distant galaxies rather than within the Milky Way. This conclusion was later supported by observations of GRB 970508, the first burst to have its redshift determined.

The position of the burst's afterglow was measurably offset from the centroid of the host galaxy, effectively ruling out the possibility that the burst originated in an active galactic nucleus. The redshift of the galaxy was later determined to be z = 0.695, which corresponds to a distance of approximately 8.123×10^{9} ly. At this distance, the burst would have released a total of 5.2×10^{44} J assuming isotropic emission.
