= SROSS-C2 =

Satellite by Indian Space Research Organisation

- Mission type: Astronomy
- Operator: ISRO
- COSPAR ID: 1994-027A
- SATCAT no.: 23099
- Website: www.isro.gov.in
- Mission duration: Mission life: 6 months Orbital life: 2 years planned, 4 years achieved

Spacecraft properties
- Spacecraft: SROSS-C2
- Manufacturer: Indian Space Research Organisation
- Launch mass: 115 kg (254 lb)
- Dimensions: 0.32 m diameter, 0.86 m tall
- Power: 45 W

Start of mission
- Launch date: 04 May 1994 5:30 hrs IST
- Rocket: Augmented Satellite Launch Vehicle, ASLV-4
- Launch site: Satish Dhawan Space Centre
- Contractor: Indian Space Research Organisation
- Entered service: May 1994

End of mission
- Disposal: atmospheric re-entry
- Deactivated: 2001 July 12

Orbital parameters
- Reference system: Geocentric orbit
- Regime: Low Earth orbit
- Perigee altitude: 437 km (272 mi)
- Apogee altitude: 938 km (583 mi)
- Inclination: 46.3°

Instruments
- 20-3000 keV Gamma-ray Burst Experiment (GRB) Retarding Potential Analyser (RPA)

SROSS-C2 or Stretched Rohini Satellite Series C2 was a satellite developed by the Indian Space Research Organisation. It conducted research on Gamma Ray Bursts in Low Earth Orbit. It was launched on 4 May 1994 using an ASLV rocket from Satish Dhawan Space Centre.

The first two satellites in the SROSS series failed to attain orbit. The third one attained a much lower orbit than planned. SROSS-C2 is thus the first fully successful, and the last satellite in the series.

== Design ==
Magnetic Torquer and Magnetic Bias Control Sensors, Magnetometer, Twin-slit Sun sensor and Temperature sensors helped the satellite to be spin stabilized. This was done using monopropellant, Hydrazine based with six thrusters each capable of delivering 1 Newton force. It has an octagonal structure. Body mounted and deployable solar panels provided 45 watts of power, with NiCd battery of 12-amp hours. S-band and VHF bands were used for communication. The SROSS C2 satellite also used an RCA CDP1802 microprocessor for the GRB experiment.

== Science data ==
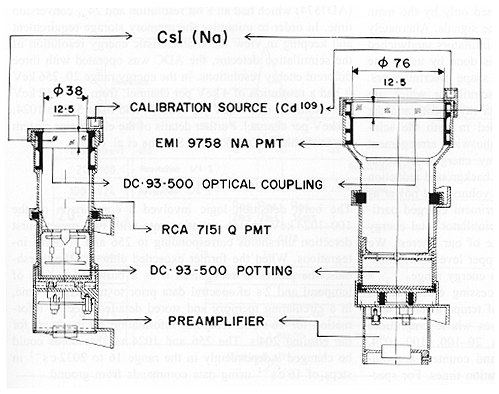
Diagram of the Gamma Ray Burst detectors onboard SROSS-C. The one which flew on SROSS-C2 are a modified version of these.

The gamma ray burst experiments on board the satellite are an improved version of the payload on the SROSS-C satellite. The improvements include increased on-board memory and a better measurement of the background spectra after a burst event. These modifications led to the discovery of twelve candidate events detected up to 15 February 1995, out of a total of 993 triggers. The SROSS-C2 spacecraft is one of the satellites included in the Interplanetary Network.

The mission also contained a Retardating Potential Analyser (RPA). It measured temperature, density and characteristics of electrons in the Earth's ionosphere, mainly in situ measurements of F-region ionospheric plasma. The instrument consisted of an electron RPA, ion RPA and a potential probe (PP), designed and developed at the National Physical Laboratory, New Delhi. It simultaneously sampled electron and ion plasma in the altitude range of 420–620 km for more than half a solar cycle from minima to maxima of the 23rd solar cycle activity. Measurements were made in a higher orbit for a limited period of two months during the initial phase, while the satellite apogee was at 930 km keeping the perigee same.
