= InterPlanetary Network =

The InterPlanetary Network (IPN) is a group of spacecraft equipped with gamma ray burst (GRB) detectors. By timing the arrival of a burst at several spacecraft, its precise location can be found. The precision for determining the direction of a GRB in the sky is improved by increasing the spacing of the detectors, and also by more accurate timing of the reception. Typical spacecraft baselines of about one AU (astronomical unit) and time resolutions of tens of milliseconds can determine a burst location within several arcminutes, allowing follow-up observations with other telescopes.

== Rationale ==
Gamma rays are too energetic to be focused with mirrors. The rays penetrate mirror materials instead of reflecting. Because gamma rays cannot be focused into an image in the traditional sense, a unique location for a gamma ray source cannot be determined as it is done with less energetic light.

In addition, gamma ray bursts are brief flashes (often as little as 0.2 seconds) that occur randomly across the sky. Some forms of gamma ray telescope can generate an image, but they require longer integration times, and cover only a fraction of the sky.

Once three spacecraft detect a GRB, their timings are sent to the ground for correlation. A sky position is derived, and distributed to the astronomical community for follow-up observations with optical, radio, or spaceborne telescopes.

== Iterations of the IPN ==
Note that, since any IPN must consist of several spacecraft, the boundaries between networks are defined differently by different commentators.

Spacecraft naturally join or leave service as their missions unfold, and some modern spacecraft are far more capable than prior IPN members.

=== A "planetary network" ===
The Vela group of satellites was originally designed to detect covert nuclear tests, possibly at the Moon's altitude. Thus, the Velas were placed in high orbits, so that a time delay would occur between spacecraft triggers. In addition, each satellite had multiple gamma-ray detectors across their structures; the detectors facing a blast would register a higher gamma count than the detectors facing away.

A gamma-ray burst was detected by the Vela group on June 3, 1969, and thus referred to as GRB 690603. The location was determined to be clearly outside of the satellites' orbit, and probably outside of the Solar System. After reviewing archived Vela data, a previous burst was determined to have occurred on July 2, 1967. Public reports of initial GRBs were not disclosed until the early 1970s.

=== Further missions ===
Additional spacecraft were given gamma-ray detectors. The Apollo 15 and 16 missions carried detectors to study the Moon; middle-to-late Venera spacecraft carried detectors to Venus. The relatively long baselines of these missions again showed that bursts originated at great distances. Other spacecraft (such as the OGO, OSO, and IMP series) had detectors for Earth, Solar, or all-sky gamma radiation, and also confirmed the GRB phenomenon.

=== The first true IPN ===
Scientists began to tailor instruments specifically for GRBs. The Helios-2 spacecraft carried a detector with precision time resolution to a Solar orbit that took it over one AU from Earth. Helios-2 was launched in 1976.

In 1978, multiple spacecraft were launched, forming the necessary baselines for a position determination. The Pioneer Venus Orbiter and its Soviet counterparts, Venera 11 and 12, took gamma detectors to the orbit of Venus. In addition, the spacecraft Prognoz-7 and ISEE-3 remained in Earth orbit. These formed an Earth-Venus-Sun triangle, and the probes at Venus formed a smaller triangle. 84 bursts were detected, until the network degraded in 1980. The Pioneer Venus Orbiter continued until it entered the Venus atmosphere in 1992, but not enough other spacecraft were functioning to form the required baselines.

On March 5 and 6, 1979, two bursts of hard X-rays were detected from the same source in the constellation Dorado by the γ-ray burst detector Konus, on the Venera 11 and Venera 12 spacecraft. These X-ray bursts were detected by several other spacecraft. As part of the InterPlanetary Network (IPN), Venera 11, Venera 12 were hit by the March 5, 1979, hard X-ray burst at ~10:51 EST, followed 11 s later by Helios 2 in orbit around the Sun, then the Pioneer Venus Orbiter at Venus. Seconds later the Vela satellites, Prognoz 7, and the Einstein Observatory in orbit around Earth were inundated. The last satellite hit was the ISEE-3 before the burst exited the Solar System.

=== The second IPN ===
Pioneer Venus Orbiter was rejoined by Ulysses in 1990. The launch of the Compton Gamma-Ray Observatory in 1991 again formed triangular baselines with PVO and Ulysses. Ulysses continued until June 2009, and the PVO mission ended in August 1992.

Compton once again brought directional discrimination with the BATSE instrument. Like the Velas, BATSE placed detectors at the spacecraft corners. Thus, Compton alone could determine a coarse burst location, to within 1.6 to 4 degrees. Baselines with other spacecraft were then used to sharpen Compton's position solutions. In addition, almost half the sky from Compton was blocked by the Earth, just as Venus blocked part of the sky for PVO. Detection or non-detection by Compton or PVO added another element to the location algorithms.

Compton also had high-precision, low-field-of-view gamma instruments. Occasionally, GRBs would occur where Compton happened to be pointing. The use of multiple, sensitive instruments would provide much more accuracy than BATSE alone.

=== The "third" IPN ===
Compton and Ulysses were joined briefly by Mars Observer in late 1992, before that spacecraft failed. Some feel that Compton provided sufficient continuity, and that the distinction between 2nd, 3rd, and subsequent IPNs is semantic.

=== "Additional" IPNs ===
Compton and Ulysses were joined by Wind in 1994. Although Wind was in Earth orbit, like Compton, its altitude was very high, thus forming a short but usable baseline. The high altitude also meant that Earth blockage was negligible. In addition, Wind carried a top and bottom detector. Interpolation between the two units usually gave a general sky direction for bursts, which in many cases could augment the IPN algorithm. The addition of RXTE in 1995 also helped. Although RXTE was an X-ray mission in Earth orbit, it could detect those gamma-ray bursts which also shone in X-rays, and give a direction (rather than merely a time trigger) for them.

Two important developments occurred in 1996. NEAR was launched; its trajectory to an asteroid again formed a triangular IPN measured in AUs. The IPN was also joined by BeppoSAX. BeppoSAX had wide-field gamma detectors, and narrow-field X-ray telescopes. Once a GRB was detected, operators could spin the spacecraft within hours to point the X-ray telescopes at the coarse location. The X-ray afterglow would then give a fine location. In 1997, the first fine location allowed detailed study of a GRB and its environ.

Compton was deorbited in 2000; the NEAR mission was shut down in early 2001. In late 2001, the Mars Odyssey spacecraft again formed an interplanetary triangle.

Other members of the network include or have included the Indian SROSS-C2 spacecraft, the US Air Force's Defense Meteorological Satellites, the Japanese Yohkoh spacecraft, and the Chinese SZ-2 mission. These have all been Earth orbiters, and the Chinese and Indian detectors were operational for only a few months.

Of all the above, Ulysses is the only spacecraft whose orbit takes it large distances away from the ecliptic plane. These deviations from the ecliptic plane allow more precise 3-D measurements of the apparent positions of the GRBs.

== The 21st century: staring spacecraft ==
New techniques and designs in high-energy astronomy spacecraft are challenging the traditional operation of the IPN. Because distant probes require sensitive ground antennas for communication, they introduce a time lag into GRB studies. Large ground antennas must split time between spacecraft, rather than listen continuously for GRB notifications. Typically, GRB coordinates determined by deep space probes are distributed many hours to a day or two after the GRB. This is very frustrating for studies of events which are measured in seconds.

A new generation of spacecraft are designed to produce GRB locations on board, then relay them to the ground within minutes or even seconds. These positions are based not on time correlation, but on X-ray telescopes, as on BeppoSAX but much faster. HETE-2, launched in 2000, stares at a large region of sky. Should a GRB trigger the gamma detectors, X-ray masks report sky coordinates to ground stations. Because HETE is in a low, consistent orbit, it can use many inexpensive ground stations. There is almost always a ground station in view of the spacecraft, which reduces latency to seconds.

The Swift spacecraft, launched in 2004, is similar in operation but much more powerful. When a GRB triggers the gamma detectors, generating a crude position, the spacecraft spins relatively rapidly to use its focusing X-ray and optical telescopes. These refine the GRB location to within arcminutes, and often within arcseconds. The fine position is reported to the ground in approximately an hour.

INTEGRAL is a successor to Compton. INTEGRAL can similarly determine a coarse position by comparing gamma counts from one side to another. It also possesses a gamma-ray telescope with an ability to determine positions to under a degree. INTEGRAL cannot pivot rapidly like the small HETE and Swift spacecraft. But should a burst happen to occur in its telescope field of view, its position and characteristics can be recorded with high precision.

RHESSI was launched in 2002 to perform solar studies. However, its gamma instrument could detect bright gamma sources from other regions of the sky, and produce coarse positions through differential detectors. Occasionally, a GRB would appear next to the Sun, and the RHESSI instrument would determine its properties without IPN assistance.

Note however, that all these spacecraft suffer from Earth blockage to varying degrees. Also, the more sophisticated the "staring" instrument, the lower the sky coverage. Randomly occurring GRBs are more likely to be missed, or detected at low resolution only. The use of non-directional deep space probes, such as MESSENGER and BepiColombo, will continue.

== Current IPN developments ==
In 2007 AGILE was launched and in 2008 the Fermi Gamma-ray Space Telescope and although these are Earth orbiters, their instruments provide directional discrimination. The Fermi Space Telescope uses both wide-area burst detectors and a narrow-angle telescope, and has a limited ability to spin itself to place a GRB within the telescope field. MESSENGER's Gamma Ray Neutron Spectrometer was able to add data to the IPN, before the end of MESSENGER's mission in 2015. Due to falling power from its RTG, Ulysses was decommissioned on June 30, 2009.

== See also ==
- Gamma-ray Burst Coordinates Network
