= GRB 971214 =

Gamma-ray burst

- Event type: Gamma-ray burst
- Constellation: Ursa Major
- Redshift: 3.418
- Other designations: GRB 971214

GRB 971214 (1SAX J1156.4+6513) is a gamma-ray burst observed in 1997. It originated 12 billion light years away. For a brief period this was thought by some researchers to have been the most energetic event observed in the universe, but this was before it was established that gamma-ray bursts are beamed towards the Earth. Thus, at the time of the discovery it was hypothesized by G. Djorgovski and his collaborators that the outburst put out more energy than several hundred typical supernovae, or the energy our galaxy puts out over a couple of centuries. However, a couple of years later it was realized that this was an upper limit as it is likely that the burst was directed towards Earth. If the jet had an opening angle of only a few degrees, the burst energy could have been thousands of times lower. The X-ray afterglow and the host galaxy of the GRB have also been observed, using BeppoSAX and Keck II respectively. The host galaxy lies at redshift z=3.4.

Since the beaming phenomenon was not yet established at the time of the discovery, the media responded by giving GRB 971214 the nickname Big Bang 2.

Records
Preceded by GRB 970508	Most distant gamma-ray burst 1997 — 2000	Succeeded by GRB 000131
