= General Coordinates Network =

System distributing location information about gamma-ray bursts

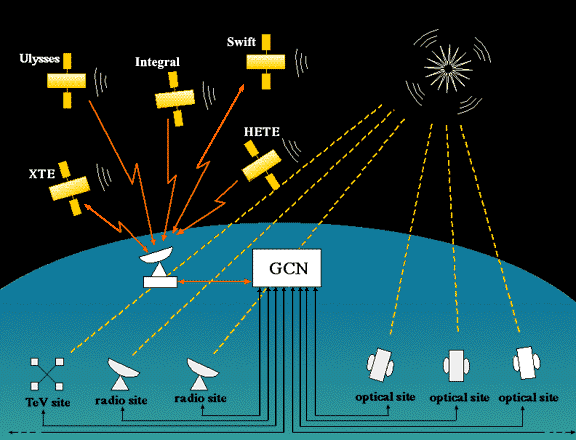
Diagram of the Gamma ray burst Coordinates Network. (NASA/GSFC)

The General Coordinates Network (GCN), formerly known as the Gamma-ray burst Coordinates Network, is an open-source platform created by NASA to receive and transmit alerts about astronomical transient phenomena. This includes neutrino detections by observatories such as IceCube or Super-Kamiokande, gravitational wave events from the LIGO, Virgo and KAGRA interferometers, and gamma-ray bursts observed by Fermi, Swift or INTEGRAL. One of the main goals is to allow for follow-up observations of an event by other observatories, in hope to observe multi-messenger events.

GCN has its origins in the BATSE coordinates distribution network (BACODINE). The Burst And Transient Source Experiment (BATSE) was a scientific instrument on the Compton Gamma-Ray Observatory (CGRO), and BACODINE monitored the BATSE real-time telemetry from CGRO. The first function of BACODINE was calculating the right ascension (RA) and declination (dec) locations for GRBs that it detected, and distributing those locations to sites around the world in real-time. Since the de-orbiting of the CGRO, this function of BACODINE is no longer operational. The second function of BACODINE was collecting right ascension and declination locations of GRBs detected by spacecraft other than CGRO, and then distributing that information. With this functionality, the original BACODINE name was changed to the more general name GCN. It later evolved to include alerts from non-GRB observatories and was sometimes referred to as GCN/TAN (for Transient Astronomy Network).

== Design ==
The GCN relies on two types of alerts: notices and circulars. Notices are machine-readable alerts, which are distributed in real time; they typically include only basic information about the event. Circulars are brief human-readable alerts, which are distributed (typically by e-mail) with a low latency but not in real time; they can also contain predictions, requests for follow-up observations from other observatories, or advertise observing plans.

The current version of the GCN relies on Kafka to distribute the alerts, improving on previous versions which used three separate protocols.

The infrastructure for sending the alerts towards the GCN is managed by the respective observatories. For the historical gamma-ray burst observatories, which are based on spacecraft, this involves sending the information to a ground station; NASA Goddard Space Flight Center was the center in charge of sending the notices from GRB observatories.

== Current participants ==
As of April 2023, 14 missions are sending alerts to the GCN :

- INTErnational Gamma-Ray Astrophysics Laboratory (INTEGRAL), a gamma-ray telescope
- Swift, a gamma-ray telescope, which provides data products not previously available from prior missions, including spectra, images, and lightcurves.
- Fermi, an American gamma-ray telescope
- AGILE, an Italian gamma-ray telescope
- HAWC, a ground-based gamma-ray and cosmic ray observatory in Mexico
- Calorimetric Electron Telescope, a Japanese electron and gamma-ray detector based on the International Space Station
- InterPlanetary Network (IPN) Position Notices from WIND (Konus), a Russian gamma-ray telescope
- MAXI, a Japanese x-ray telescope mounted on the International Space Station
- SuperNova Early Warning System (SNEWS), a consortium of neutrino facilities for alerts from core-collapse supernovae
- IceCube, a neutrino experiment based in the South Pole
- Super-Kamiokande, a Japanese neutrino observatory
- LIGO-Virgo-KAGRA, an international network of gravitational wave detectors
- GECAM, a group of two Chinese x-ray and gamma-ray observatories designed for follow-up of gravitational wave events
- Microlensing Observations in Astrophysics (MOA) project, with alerts on microlensing events

Past spacecraft and instruments that participated in GCN include Array of Low Energy X-ray Imaging Sensors (ALEXIS), BeppoSAX, the Imaging Compton Telescope (COMPTEL) on CGRO, the X-Ray/Gamma-Ray Spectrometer (XGRS) on NEAR Shoemaker, the High Energy Transient Explorer (WMM and SXC), the Rossi X-ray Timing Explorer (PCA and ASM) and Ulysses.
