= MRB constant =

Mathematical constant described by Marvin Ray Burns

First 100 partial sums of $(-1)^k (k^{1/k} - 1)$

The MRB constant is a mathematical constant, with decimal expansion 0.187859… (sequence A037077 in the OEIS). The constant is named after its discoverer, Marvin Ray Burns, who published his discovery of the constant in 1999. Burns had initially called the constant "rc" for root constant but, at Simon Plouffe's suggestion, the constant was renamed the 'Marvin Ray Burns's Constant', or "MRB constant".

The MRB constant is defined as the upper limit of the partial sums

$$s_n = \sum_{k=1}^n (-1)^k k^{1/k}$$

As $n$ grows to infinity, the sums have upper and lower limit points of −0.812140... and 0.187859..., separated by an interval of length 1. The constant can also be explicitly defined by the following infinite sums:

$$0.187859\ldots = \sum_{k=1}^{\infty} (-1)^k (k^{1/k} - 1) = \sum_{k=1}^{\infty} \left((2k)^{1/(2k)} - (2k-1)^{1/(2k-1)}\right).$$

The constant relates to the divergent series:

$$\sum_{k=1}^{\infty} (-1)^k k^{1/k}.$$

There is no known closed-form expression of the MRB constant, nor is it known whether the MRB constant is algebraic, transcendental or even irrational.
