= Stretched Rohini Satellite Series =

Series of satellites developed by the Indian Space Research Organisation

- Manufacturer: ISRO
- Country of origin: India
- Operator: ISRO
- Applications: Gamma ray astronomy

Specifications
- Launch mass: 106–150 kilograms (234–331 lb)
- Power: ~100 watts
- Batteries: Ni-Cd
- Equipment: Gamma-Ray Burst; Retarded Potential Analyser
- Regime: Low Earth
- Design life: 2 years

Production
- Status: Retired
- Built: 4
- Launched: 4
- Retired: 1
- Lost: 3
- Maiden launch: SROSS-A/SROSS-1; 24 March 1987
- Last launch: SROSS-C2; 4 May 1994

Related spacecraft
- Derived from: Rohini

The Stretched Rohini Satellite Series (SROSS) are a series of satellites developed by the Indian Space Research Organisation as follow ons to the Rohini Satellites for conducting astrophysics, Earth Remote Sensing, and upper atmospheric monitoring experiments as well as for new and novel application-oriented missions. These satellites were the payload of the developmental flights of the Augmented Satellite Launch Vehicle.

== Satellites in series ==
=== SROSS A and SROSS B ===
The first two satellites in the series did not make it into orbit due to launch vehicle failure. SROSS-A carried two retro-reflectors for laser tracking. SROSS-B carried two instruments; a West German Monocular Electro Optical Stereo Scanner (MEOSS) and ISRO's 20-3000keV Gamma-ray Burst Experiment (GRB).

=== SROSS C ===
The third, SROSS 3 (also known as SROSS C), attained a lower-than-planned orbit on 20 May 1992. The GRB monitored celestial gamma ray bursts in the energy range 20–3000 keV. SROSS C and C2 carried a gamma-ray burst (GRB) experiment and a Retarded Potential Analyzer (RPA) experiment. The GRB experiment operated from 25 May 1992 until reentry on 14 July 1992. The instrument consisted of a main and a redundant CsI(Na) scintillator operating in the energy range 20–3000 keV. The crystals were 76 mm (main) and 37 mm (redundant) in diameter. Each had a thickness of 12.5 mm. A 'burst mode' was triggered by the 100–1024 keV count rate exceeding a preset limit during a 256 or 1024 ms time integration. In this mode, 65 s of temporal and 2 s of spectral data prior to the trigger are stored, as well as the subsequent 16 s of spectral data and 204 s of temporal data. The low resolution data consists of two energy channels (20–100 keV and 100–1024 keV) from 65 s before the trigger to 204 s after the trigger in 256 ms integrations. The 20–1024 keV rates are also recorded with a 2 ms resolution for 1 s prior to 1 s after trigger and a 16 ms resolution for 1s prior to 8 s after the trigger. Energy spectra are conducted with a 124 channel PHA. Four pre-trigger spectra and 32 post-trigger spectra are recorded for every burst with a 512 ms integration time. The RPA measured temperature, density and characteristics of electrons in the Earth's ionosphere. The GRB experiment computer system used the RCA CDP1802 microprocessor.

=== SROSS C2 ===
SROSS-C2 was launched on 4 May 1994. The gamma ray burst experiments on board SROSS-C2 are an improved version of the GRB payload flown successfully on the SROSS-C satellite. The improvements include enhancements of the on-board memory and a better measurement of the background spectra after a burst event. These improvements led to the discovery of twelve candidate events detected up to 15 February 1995, out of a total of 993 triggers. The SROSS-C2 spacecraft is one of the satellites included in the Interplanetary Network. The SROSS C2 satellite also used an RCA CDP1802 microprocessor for the GRB experiment.

== See also ==
- List of Indian satellites
