= Davie Poplar =

Large poplar tree in North Carolina

Coordinates: 35.9128°N 79.0517°W

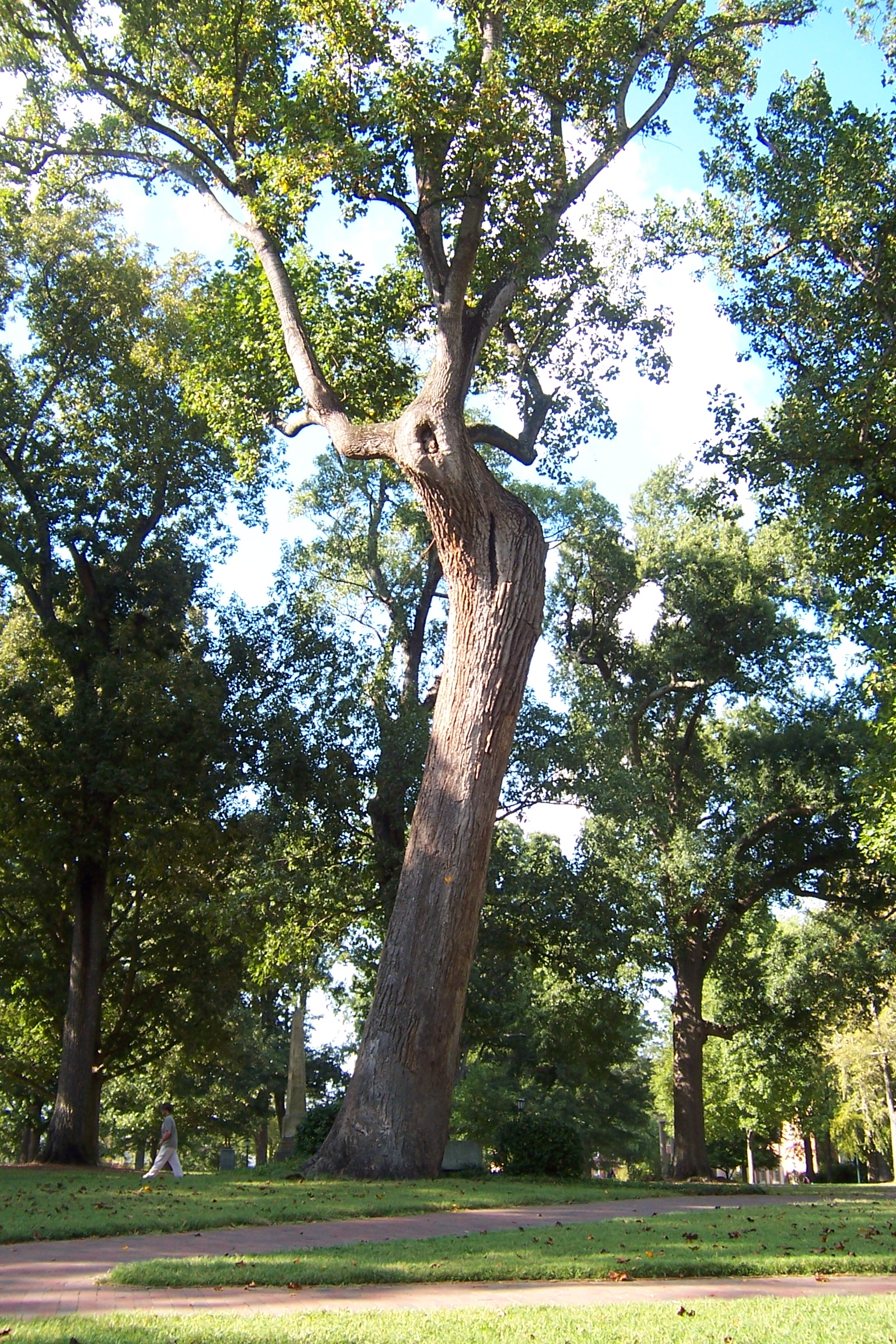
- Davie Poplar in spring 2004
- Location: McCorkle Place, University of North Carolina, Chapel Hill, North Carolina
- Established: c. 1650
- Website: Davie Poplar

Davie Poplar is a large tulip poplar tree located in McCorkle Place on the campus of the University of North Carolina at Chapel Hill. Named in honor of Revolutionary War general and university founder William Richardson Davie, the tree is approximately 300 to 375 years old.

== History and legends ==
As plans were being drawn up for the university in 1792, it was already a large tree, and legend has it that Davie personally chose to locate the school lands around the tree after having a pleasant summer lunch underneath it. The story is not true – the university's location was chosen by a six-man committee in November 1792 – and the tree was named by Cornelia Phillips Spencer in the late 1800s to commemorate the legend.

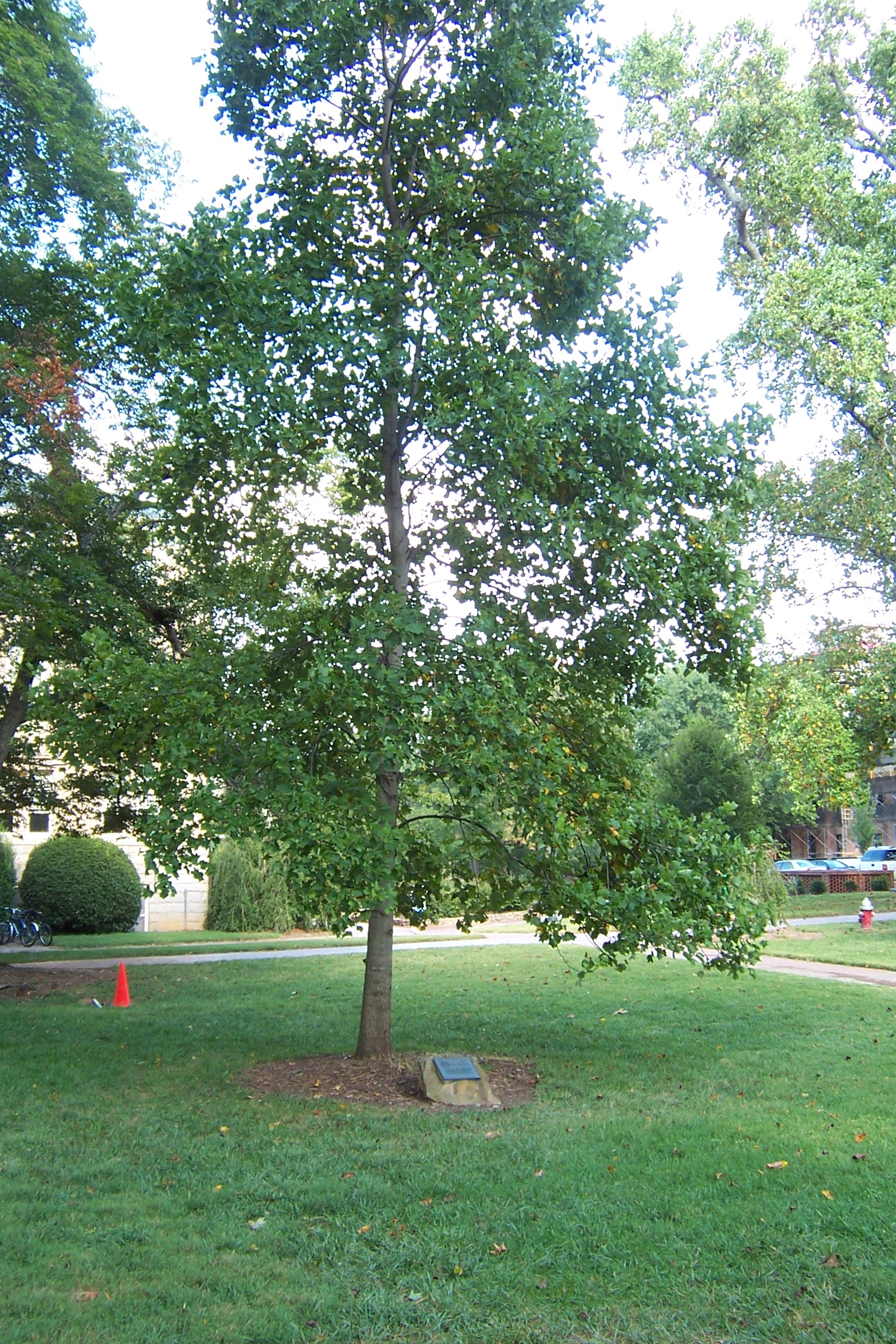
Davie Poplar III, planted in 1993 from the original tree's seeds

The most enduring legend associated with the tree is that as long as Davie Poplar remains standing, the university will thrive; if it falls, the university will crumble. As such, many steps have been taken to preserve the tree. In 1918, after the tree was struck by lightning and fear that the tree was dying, UNC grafted a new tree, called Davie Poplar Jr. A second Davie Poplar Jr. was planted near Hinton James Hall. Later, another tree, called Davie Poplar III, was planted nearby with a seed from the original tree. A steel band was added to Davie Poplar in 1953 to attach cables to other trees, and the base has been filled with concrete and pruned to keep it upright.

As part of the university's bicentennial celebration in 1993, 100 seedlings from the tree were given to 100 children planted across North Carolina's 100 counties. Where the trees were planted is not known, except for the Burke County seedling, which is in front of Table Rock Middle School. In 1996, Davie Poplar was damaged by Hurricane Fran.

A fire was set and a small device was detonated at the base of Davie Poplar on November 2, 2017, producing a small fire ball and scorching the side of the tree. The explosion caused minor injuries to Dr. Daniel Reichart who tried to stomp out the fire.

In 2024, a large population of chimney swifts was documented to use the tree as a roosting site. This marks one of the only known modern cases of swifts roosting in large, hollow trees, which were their ancestral roosting sites prior to mass logging of such trees after European settlement.

== See also ==
- List of individual trees
