= GRB 970508 =

Gamma-ray burst detected on May 8, 1997

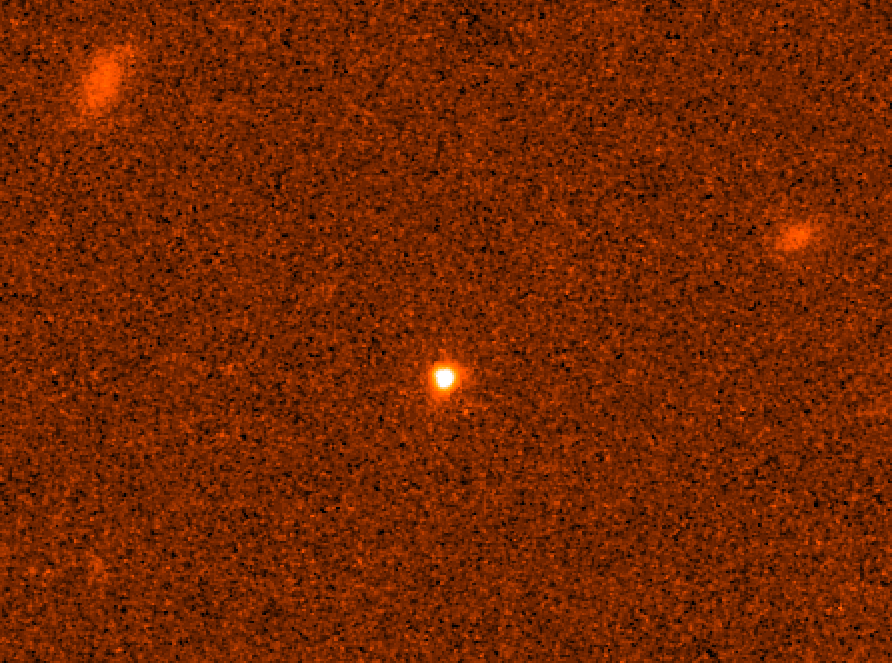
- Image of the optical afterglow of GRB 970508 taken one month after the burst was detected
- Event type: Gamma-ray burst
- Date: 21:24 UTC; May 8, 1997
- Constellation: Camelopardalis
- Right ascension: 06^{h} 53^{m} 49^{s}
- Declination: +79° 16′ 19.6″
- Distance: 6,000,000,000 ly (1.8×10^{9} pc)
- Redshift: 0.835 ≤ z ≤ 2.3
- Peak apparent magnitude: 19.6
- Total energy output: 5 × 10^{50} erg (5 × 10^{43} J)
- Other designations: GRB 970508
- Related media on Commons

GRB 970508 was a gamma-ray burst (GRB) detected on May 8, 1997, at 21:42 UTC. It is historically important as the second GRB (after GRB 970228) with a detected afterglow at other wavelengths, the first to have a direct redshift measurement of the afterglow, and the first to be detected at radio wavelengths.

A gamma-ray burst is a highly luminous flash associated with an explosion in a distant galaxy and producing gamma rays, the most energetic form of electromagnetic radiation, and often followed by a longer-lived "afterglow" emitted at longer wavelengths (X-ray, ultraviolet, optical, infrared, and radio).

GRB 970508 was detected by the Gamma Ray Burst Monitor on the Italian–Dutch X-ray astronomy satellite BeppoSAX. Astronomer Mark Metzger determined that GRB 970508 occurred at least 6 billion light years from Earth; this was the first measurement of the distance to a gamma-ray burst.

Until this burst, astronomers had not reached a consensus regarding how far away GRBs occur from Earth. Some supported the idea that GRBs occur within the Milky Way, but are visibly faint because they are not highly energetic. Others concluded that GRBs occur in other galaxies at cosmological distances and are extremely energetic. Although the possibility of multiple types of GRBs meant that the two theories were not mutually exclusive, the distance measurement unequivocally placed the source of the GRB outside the Milky Way, effectively ending the debate.

GRB 970508 was also the first burst with an observed radio frequency afterglow. By analyzing the fluctuating strength of the radio signals, astronomer Dale Frail calculated that the source of the radio waves had expanded almost at the speed of light. This provided strong evidence that GRBs are relativistically expanding explosions.

== Discovery ==
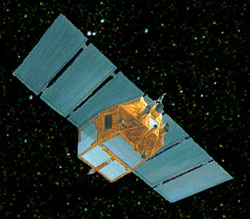
Artist's conception of BeppoSAX in orbit

A gamma-ray burst (GRB) is a highly luminous flash of gamma rays—the most energetic form of electromagnetic radiation. GRBs were first detected in 1967 by the Vela satellites (a series of spacecraft designed to detect nuclear explosions in space). The initial burst is often followed by a longer-lived "afterglow" emitted at longer wavelengths (X-ray, ultraviolet, optical, infrared, and radio). The first GRB afterglow to be discovered was the X-ray afterglow of GRB 970228, which was detected by BeppoSAX, an Italian–Dutch satellite originally designed to study X-rays.

On Thursday May 8, 1997, at 21:42 UTC, BeppoSAX's Gamma Ray Burst Monitor registered a gamma-ray burst that lasted approximately 15 seconds. It was also detected by Ulysses, a robotic space probe designed to study the Sun, and by the Burst and Transient Source Experiment (BATSE) on board the Compton Gamma Ray Observatory. The burst also occurred within the field of view of one of BeppoSAX's two X-ray Wide Field Cameras. Within a few hours, the BeppoSAX team localized the burst to an error box—a small area around the specific position to account for the error in the position—with a diameter of approximately 10 arcminutes.

== Observations ==
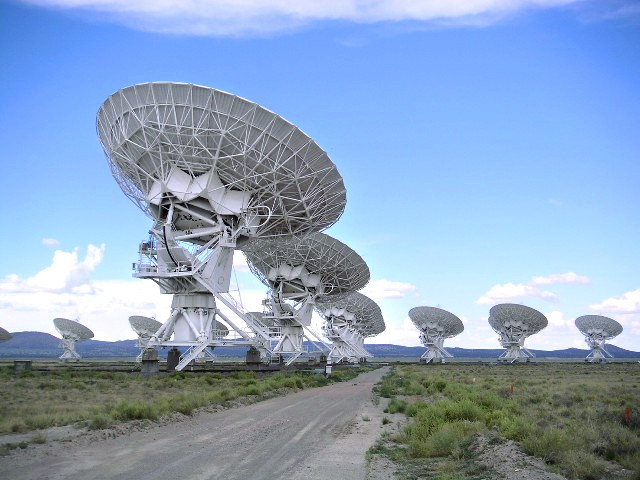
The Very Large Array in New Mexico

After a rough position of the burst had been determined, Enrico Costa of the BeppoSAX team contacted astronomer Dale Frail at the National Radio Astronomy Observatory's Very Large Array. Frail began making observations at a wavelength of 20 centimeters at 01:30 UTC, less than four hours after the discovery. While preparing for his observations Frail contacted astronomer Stanislav Djorgovski, who was working with the Hale Telescope. Djorgovski immediately compared his images of the region with older images from the Digitized Sky Survey, but he found no new sources of light within the error box. Mark Metzger, a colleague of Djorgovski at the Caltech observatory, conducted a more extensive analysis of the data, but was also unable to identify any new light sources.

The following evening Djorgovski again observed the region. He compared the images from both nights but the error box contained no objects that had decreased in luminosity between May 8 and May 9. Metzger noticed one object that had increased in luminosity, but he assumed it was a variable star rather than the GRB afterglow. Titus Galama and Paul Groot, members of a research team in Amsterdam led by Jan van Paradijs, compared images taken by the WIYN Telescope on May 8 and the William Herschel Telescope on May 9. They were also unable to find any light sources which had faded during that time.

After discovering the burst's X-ray afterglow, the BeppoSAX team provided a more accurate localization, and what Metzger had assumed to be a variable star was still present in this smaller error box. Both the Caltech team and the Amsterdam team were hesitant to publish any conclusions on the variable object. On May 10 Howard Bond of the Space Telescope Science Institute published his discovery, which was later confirmed to be the burst's optical afterglow.

On the night between May 10 and May 11, 1997, Metzger's colleague Charles Steidel recorded the spectrum of the variable object at the W. M. Keck Observatory. He then sent the data to Metzger, who after identifying a system of absorption lines associated with magnesium and iron determined a redshift of z = 0.8349 ± 0.0002, indicating that light from the burst had been absorbed by matter roughly 6 billion light-years from Earth. Although the redshift of the burst itself had not been determined, the absorbent matter was necessarily located between the burst and the Earth, implying that the burst itself was at least as far away. The absence of Lyman-alpha forest features in the spectra constrained the redshift to z ≤ 2.3, while further investigation by Daniel E. Reichart of the University of Chicago suggested a redshift of z ≈ 1.09. This was the first instance in which scientists were able to measure the redshift of a GRB. Several optical spectra were also obtained at the Calar Alto Observatory at wavelength ranges of 4,300–7,100 Å (430–710 nm) and 3,500–8,000 Å (350–800 nm), but no emission lines were identified.

On May 13, five days after the first detection of GRB 970508, Frail resumed his observations with the Very Large Array. He made observations of the burst's position at a wavelength of 3.5 cm and immediately detected a strong signal. After 24 hours, the 3.5 cm signal became significantly stronger, and he also detected signals at the 6 and 21 cm wavelengths. This was the first confirmed observation of a radio afterglow of a GRB.

Over the next month, Frail observed that the luminosity of the radio source fluctuated significantly from day to day but increased on average. The fluctuations did not occur simultaneously along all of the observed wavelengths, which Jeremy Goodman of Princeton University explained as being the result of the radio waves being bent by interstellar plasma in the Milky Way. Such radio scintillations (rapid variations in the radio luminosity of an object) occur only when the source has an apparent diameter of less than 3 microarcseconds.

== Characteristics ==
BeppoSAX's Gamma-Ray Burst Monitor, operating in the energy range of 40–700 keV, recorded a fluence of (1.85 ± 0.3) × 10^{−6} erg/cm^{2} (1.85 ± 0.3 nJ/m^{2}), and the Wide Field Camera (2–26 keV) recorded a fluence of (0.7 ± 0.1) × 10^{−6} erg/cm^{2} (0.7 ± 0.1 nJ/m^{2}). BATSE (20–1000 keV) recorded a fluence of (3.1 ± 0.2) × 10^{−6} erg/cm^{2} (3.1 ± 0.2 nJ/m^{2}).

About 5 hours after the burst the apparent magnitude of the object—a logarithmic measure of its brightness with a higher number indicating a fainter object—was 20.3 ± 0.3 in the U-band (the ultraviolet region of the spectrum) and 21.2 ± 0.1 in the R-band (the red region of the spectrum). The afterglow reached its peak luminosity in both bands approximately 2 days after the burst was first detected—19.6 ± 0.3 in the U-band at 02:13 UTC on May 11, and 19.8 ± 0.2 in the R-band at 20:55 UTC on May 10.

James E. Rhoads, an astronomer at the Kitt Peak National Observatory, analyzed the burst and determined that it was not strongly beamed. Further analysis by Frail and his colleagues indicated that the total energy released by the burst was approximately 5×10^{50} ergs (5×10^{43} J), and Rhoads determined that the total gamma-ray energy was approximately 3×10^{50} erg (3×10^{43} J). This implied that the gamma-ray and kinetic energy of the burst's ejecta were comparable, effectively ruling out those GRB models which are relatively inefficient at producing gamma rays.

== Distance scale and emission model ==
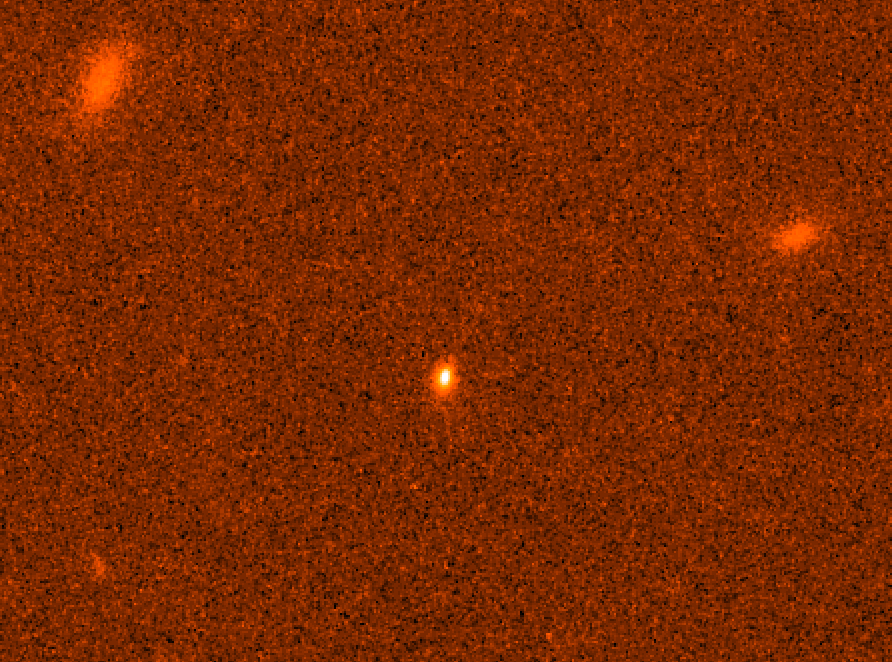
Image of GRB 970508's host galaxy taken in August 1998

Prior to this burst, astronomers had not reached consensus regarding how far away GRBs occur from Earth. Although the isotropic distribution of bursts suggested that they do not occur within the disk of the Milky Way, some astronomers supported the idea that they occur within the Milky Way's halo, concluding that the bursts are visibly faint because they are not highly energetic. Others concluded that GRBs occur in other galaxies at cosmological distances and that they can be detected because they are extremely energetic. The distance measurement and the calculations of the burst's total energy release unequivocally supported the latter theory, effectively ending the debate.

Throughout the month of May the radio scintillations became less noticeable until they ceased altogether. This implies that the radio source significantly expanded in the time that had passed since the burst was detected. Using the known distance to the source and the elapsed time before the scintillation ended, Frail calculated that the radio source had expanded at almost the speed of light. While various existing models already encompassed the notion of a relativistically expanding fireball, this was the first strong evidence to support such a model.

== Host galaxy ==
The afterglow of GRB 970508 reached a peak total luminosity 19.82 days after the burst was detected. It then faded with a power law slope over about 100 days. The afterglow eventually disappeared, revealing the burst's host, an actively star-forming dwarf galaxy with an apparent magnitude of V = 25.4 ± 0.15. The galaxy was well fitted by an exponential disk with an ellipticity of 0.70 ± 0.07. The redshift of GRB 970508's optical afterglow, z = 0.835, agreed with the host galaxy's redshift of z = 0.83, suggesting that, unlike previously observed bursts, GRB 970508 may have been associated with an active galactic nucleus.

== See also ==
- List of gamma-ray bursts
