= Ray Klebesadel =

American astronomer

Ray Klebesadel is a retired scientist who was a member of the gamma-ray astronomy group at the Los Alamos National Laboratory (LANL) in New Mexico that discovered cosmic gamma-ray bursts using data from the Vela satellites. These were deployed by the United States after the signing of the Nuclear Test Ban Treaty of 1963 to enforce the ban of nuclear tests in outer space. The unexplained gamma-ray flashes were first found in 1969, in data collected in 1967. Klebesadel indicated that contrary to popular belief, the data was never classified. Klebesadel, Ian Strong, and Roy Olson (also of LANL) published this discovery was published as an Astrophysical Journal letter with the title "Observations of Gamma-Ray Bursts of Cosmic Origin" in June 1973. They published it again in the October 1976 issue of the Scientific American.

Klebesadel was selected as a fellow of the LANL in 1989.
