= Venera 11 =

1978 Soviet uncrewed spacecraft which successfully landed on Venus

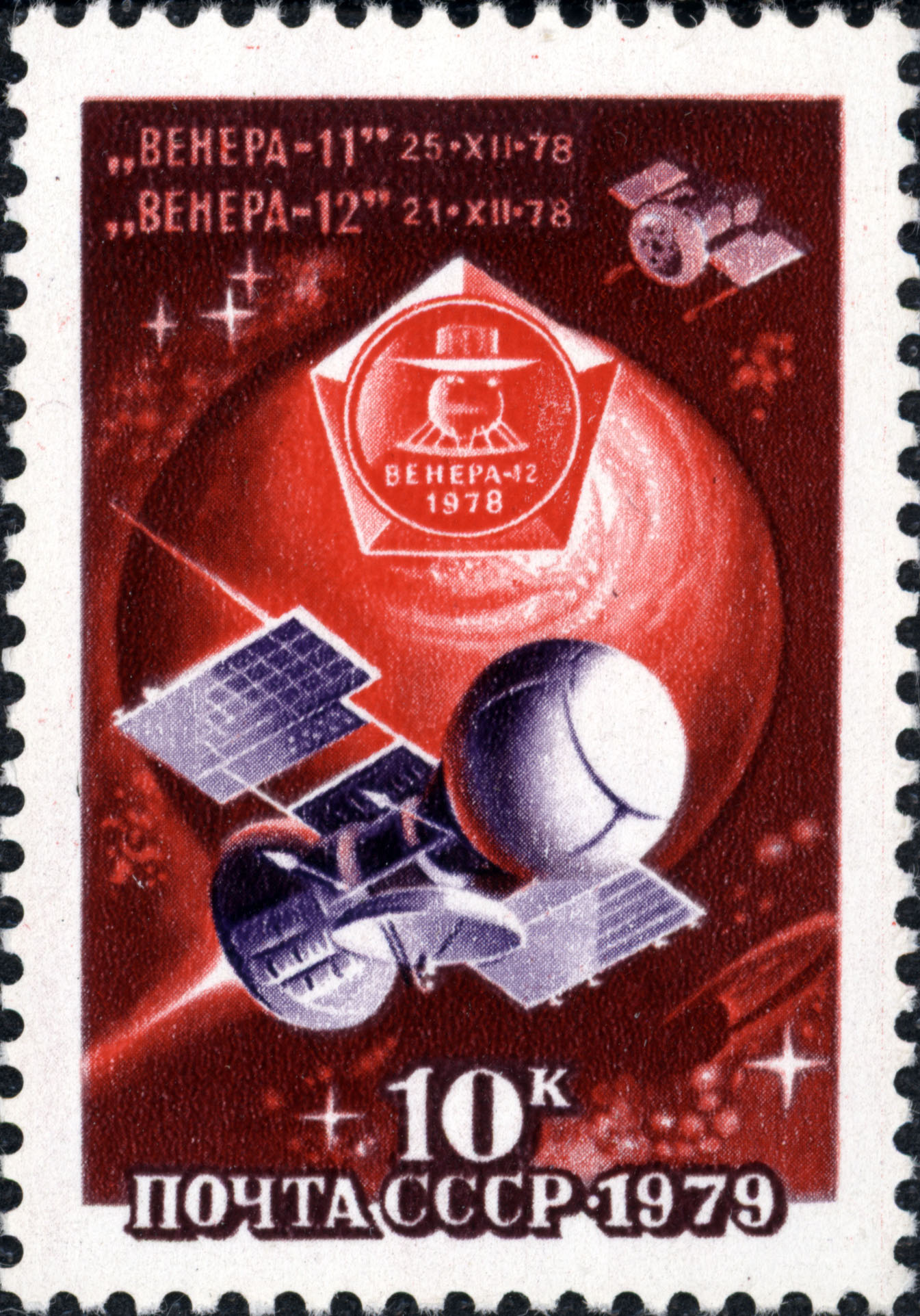
- Seal of Venera 11
- Operator: Soviet Academy of Sciences
- COSPAR ID: 1978-084A; 1978-084D
- SATCAT no.: 11020; 11027
- Mission duration: Travel: 3 months and 16 days Lander: 95 minutes

Spacecraft properties
- Spacecraft: 4V-1
- Spacecraft type: 4V-1 No. 360
- Bus: 4MV
- Launch mass: 4,447.3 kg (9,805 lb)
- BOL mass: 4,715 kg (10,395 lb)
- Landing mass: 760 kg (1,680 lb)
- Dimensions: 2.7 m × 2.3 m × 5.7 m (8.9 ft × 7.5 ft × 18.7 ft)

Start of mission
- Launch date: September 9, 1978, 03:25:39 UTC
- Rocket: Proton-K/D-1 8K82K
- Launch site: Baikonur 81/23

End of mission
- Last contact: February 1, 1980

Orbital parameters
- Reference system: Geocentric
- Regime: Low Earth
- Semi-major axis: 6,569 kilometers (4,082 mi)
- Eccentricity: 0.0312
- Perigee altitude: 177 kilometers (110 mi)
- Apogee altitude: 205 kilometers (127 mi)
- Inclination: 51.5°

Flyby of Venus
- Spacecraft component: Venera 11 flight platform
- Closest approach: 25 December 1978
- Distance: ~35,000 kilometers (22,000 mi)

Venus lander
- Spacecraft component: Venera 11 descent craft
- Landing date: 25 December 1978, 03:24
- Landing site: 14°S 299°E (near Phoebe Regio)

The Venera 11 (Russian: Венера-11 meaning Venus 11) was a Soviet uncrewed space mission which was part of the Venera program to explore the planet Venus. Venera 11 was launched on 9 September 1978 at 03:25:39 UTC.

Separating from its flight platform on December 23, 1978 the lander entered the Venus atmosphere two days later on December 25 at 11.2 km/s. During the descent, it employed aerodynamic braking followed by parachute braking and ending with atmospheric braking. It made a soft landing on the surface at 06:24 Moscow Time (03:24 UT) on 25 December after a descent time of approximately 1 hour. The touchdown speed was 7 to 8 m/s. Information was transmitted to the flight platform for retransmittal to Earth until it moved out of range 95 minutes after touchdown. Landing coordinates are 14°S 299°E.

== Flight platform ==
After ejection of the lander probe, the flight platform continued on past Venus in a heliocentric orbit. Near encounter with Venus occurred on December 25, 1978, at approximately 35,000 km altitude. The flight platform acted as a data relay for the descent craft for 95 minutes until it flew out of range and returned its own measurements on interplanetary space.

Venera 11 flight platform carried solar wind detectors, ionosphere electron instruments and two gamma ray burst detectors – the Soviet-built KONUS and the French-built SIGNE 2. The SIGNE 2 detectors were simultaneously flown on Venera 12 and Prognoz 7 to allow triangulation of gamma ray sources. Before and after Venus flyby, Venera 11 and Venera 12 yielded detailed time-profiles for 143 gamma-ray bursts, resulting in the first ever catalog of such events. The last gamma-ray burst reported by Venera 11 occurred on January 27, 1980.

List of flight platform instruments and experiments:

- 30–166 nm Extreme UV spectrometer
- Compound plasma spectrometer
- KONUS Gamma-ray burst detector
- SNEG Gamma-ray Burst detector
- Magnetometer
- 4 Semiconductor counters
- 2 Gas-discharge counters
- 4 Scintillation counters
- Hemispherical proton telescope

The mission ended in February, 1980. Venera 11 is currently in heliocentric orbit, with perihelion of 0.69 AU, aphelion of 1.01 AU, eccentricity of 0.19, inclination of 2.3 degrees and orbital period of 284 days.

== Lander ==
The lander carried instruments to study the temperature and atmospheric and soil chemical composition. A device called Groza was intended to search for lightning on Venus. Both Venera 11 and Venera 12 had landers with two cameras, each designed for color imaging, though Soviet literature does not mention them. Each failed to return images when the lens covers did not separate after landing due to a design flaw. The soil analyzer also failed. A gas chromatograph was on board to measure the composition of the Venus atmosphere, as well as instruments to study scattered solar radiation. Results reported included some evidence of lightning, a high Ar^{36}/Ar^{40} ratio, and the discovery of carbon monoxide at low altitudes.

List of lander experiments and instruments:

- Backscatter Nephelometer
- Mass spectrometer – MKh-6411
- Gas chromatograph – Sigma
- X-Ray fluorospectrometer
- 360° Scanning photometer – IOAV
- Spectrometer (430–1170 nm)
- Microphone/anemometer
- Low-frequency radio sensor
- 4 Thermometers
- 3 Barometers
- Accelerometer – Bizon
- Penetrometer – PrOP-V
- Soil analysis device
- 2 Color cameras
- Small solar batteries – MSB

== See also ==
- List of missions to Venus
- Timeline of artificial satellites and space probes
