= Dale Frail =

Canadian astronomer

Dale A. Frail (b. 1961) is a Canadian astronomer working at the National Radio Astronomy Observatory (NRAO) in Socorro, New Mexico.

== Early life ==
He was born in Canada, spent much of his childhood in Europe, and his professional career has been based in the United States.

== Career ==
Frail received his university education in Canada: first an undergraduate degree in Physics from Acadia University in Nova Scotia, followed by MSc and PhD degrees in Astrophysics from the University of Toronto. In 1989 he moved to the United States as an NSERC Postdoctoral Fellow. After completing a prized Jansky Postdoctoral Fellowship in 1993, he joined the research staff of the National Radio Astronomy Observatory, where he remained throughout his career. He was awarded Astronomer Emeritus status by Associated Universities, Inc. upon retirement in 2021, and continues active research programs.

He is the author of over 250 peer-reviewed research papers, including more than 30 articles in the prestigious journal Nature. He has made contributions to numerous sub-fields of astrophysics including multi-wavelength electromagnetic counterparts of gravitational-wave events, gamma-ray bursts, extrasolar planets, soft gamma-ray repeaters, the interstellar medium, pulsars, masers, and supernova remnants. To the public he is best known for discoveries in extrasolar planets and gamma-ray bursts. In 2010, he was awarded a Guggenheim fellowship. From August 2011 through September 2015, he was NRAO's Assistant Director for the Karl G. Jansky Very Large Array and the Very Long Baseline Array, and site director for New Mexico operations. In 2016, he received an honorary Doctor of Science degree from Acadia University.

== Key discoveries ==
In early 1992, Frail and Polish astronomer Aleksander Wolszczan announced their discovery of the existence of two planets and a possible third around the pulsar PSR B1257+12. Their discovery was confirmed in mid-1992. In addition to being the first confirmed discovery of pulsar planets, the find is also generally considered to be the first confirmed discovery of extrasolar planets of any kind.

Beginning in 1997, Frail was part of a Caltech-NRAO team that helped unravel the long-standing mystery of the origin of gamma-ray bursts. They used an optical spectrum taken with the Keck Telescope toward the optical afterglow of GRB 970508 to establish that gamma-ray bursts were at cosmological distances. They then used the Very Large Array radio telescope discovery of radio afterglow emission from this same burst to measure the object's size and infer that the source was expanding relativistically. These two observations have remained cornerstones in the cosmological fireball model for gamma-ray bursts. In 2009 Thomson ISI listed Frail as the third-most cited researcher in the field of gamma-ray bursts over the period from 1999 to February 2009.

In 2026, the American Institute of Physics (AIP) published an article on the history of the pulsar planets discovery, based on interviews with Wolszczan and Frail. There are many other popular science accounts of the discovery of extra-solar planets as well as those of gamma-ray bursts and their afterglows. Links to a few of these and other relevant articles can be found below.
