= Augmented Satellite Launch Vehicle =

Retired Indian small-lift launch vehicle

- ASLV liftoff
- Function: Small-lift launch vehicle
- Manufacturer: ISRO
- Country of origin: India

Size
- Height: 23.5 m (77 ft)
- Diameter: 1 m (3 ft 3 in)
- Mass: 41,000 kg (90,000 lb)

Capacity

Payload to 400 km LEO
- Mass: 150 kg (330 lb)

Associated rockets
- Family: SLV, PSLV

Launch history
- Status: Retired
- Launch sites: Satish Dhawan Space Centre
- Total launches: 4
- Success(es): 1
- Failure: 2
- Partial failure: 1
- First flight: 24 March 1987
- Last flight: 4 May 1994
- Carries passengers or cargo: SROSS

First stage
- Powered by: 2 solid
- Maximum thrust: 502.6 kN (113,000 lbf) each
- Specific impulse: 253 seconds (2.48 km/s)
- Burn time: 49 seconds
- Propellant: Solid

Second stage
- Powered by: 1 solid
- Maximum thrust: 702.6 kN (158,000 lbf)
- Specific impulse: 259 seconds (2.54 km/s)
- Burn time: 45 seconds
- Propellant: Solid

Third stage
- Powered by: 1 solid
- Maximum thrust: 304 kN (68,000 lbf)
- Specific impulse: 276 seconds (2.71 km/s)
- Burn time: 36 seconds
- Propellant: Solid

Fourth stage
- Powered by: 1 solid
- Maximum thrust: 90.7 kN (20,400 lbf)
- Specific impulse: 277 seconds (2.72 km/s)
- Burn time: 45 seconds
- Propellant: Solid

Fifth stage
- Powered by: 1 solid
- Maximum thrust: 35 kN (7,900 lbf)
- Specific impulse: 281 seconds (2.76 km/s)
- Burn time: 33 seconds
- Propellant: Solid

The Augmented Satellite Launch Vehicle (ASLV) was a small-lift launch vehicle five-stage solid-fuel rocket developed by ISRO to place 150 kg satellites into LEO. This project was started by India during the early 1980s to develop technologies needed for a payload to be placed into a geostationary orbit. Its design was based on Satellite Launch Vehicle with two additional booster stages deried from the SLV-3 boosters. ISRO did not have sufficient funds for both the Polar Satellite Launch Vehicle programme and the ASLV programme at the same time and the ASLV programme was terminated after the initial developmental flights. The payloads of ASLV were Stretched Rohini Satellites.

== Vehicle ==
The ASLV was a five-stage vehicle. Two strap-on boosters acted as a first stage, with the core stage igniting after booster burn out. The payload capacity of the ASLV was approximately 150 kg (330 lb) to an orbit of 400 km (250 mi) with a 47-degree inclination.

At liftoff, the ASLV generated 909.9 kN (204,500 lbf) of thrust. It was a 41,000-kilogram (90,000 lb) rocket, measuring 23.5 metres (77 ft) in length with a core diameter of one metre (3 ft 3 in). Small liquid engine thrusters that had developed by ISRO for SLV-3 called the Secondary Injection Thrust Vector Control system were also used on the ASLV. The height to diameter ratio of ASLV was very large which resulted in the vehicle being unstable in flight. This was compounded by the fact that many of the critical events during a launch like the core ignition and the booster separation happened at the Tropopause where the dynamic loads on the launcher was at the maximum. The aerodynamic characterization research was conducted at the National Aerospace Laboratories' 1.2m Trisonic Wind Tunnel Facility.

== History ==
The ASLV made four launches, of which one was successful, two failed to achieve orbit, and a third achieved a lower than planned orbit which decayed quickly. The type made its maiden flight on 24 March 1987, and its final flight on 4 May 1994.

== Launch history ==
All four ASLV launches occurred from the ASLV Launch Pad at the Sriharikota Range. For vertically integrated ASLV, many SLV-3 ground facilities were reused but a new launch pad with retractable Mobile Service Structure was constructed within the same launch complex.

Flight No.	Date / time (UTC)	Rocket, Configuration	Launch site	Payload	Payload mass	Orbit	User	Launch outcome
D1	24 March 1987	ASLV	Satish Dhawan Space Centre	SROSS-A	150 kg (330 lb)			Failure
D1	First stage failed to ignite after launch							
D2	13 July 1988	ASLV	Satish Dhawan Space Centre	SROSS-B	150 kg (330 lb)			Failure
D2	Control problems caused launcher to disintegrate							
D3	20 May 1992	ASLV	Satish Dhawan Space Centre	SROSS-C	106 kg (234 lb)			Partial failure
D3	Orbit lower than expected and incorrect spin-stabilization. Decayed quickly.							
D4	5 May 1994	ASLV	Satish Dhawan Space Centre	SROSS-C2	113 kg (249 lb)			Success

== Launch statistics ==
- Failure
- Partial failure
- Success

Decade-wise summary of ASLV launches

Decade	Successful	Partial success	Failure	Total
1980s	0	0	2	2
1990s	1	1	0	2
Total	1	1	2	4

== See also ==
- Launch vehicles of ISRO
- Comparison of orbital launchers families
