= INTEGRAL =

European space telescope for observing gamma rays

INTErnational Gamma-Ray Astrophysics Laboratory (INTEGRAL)
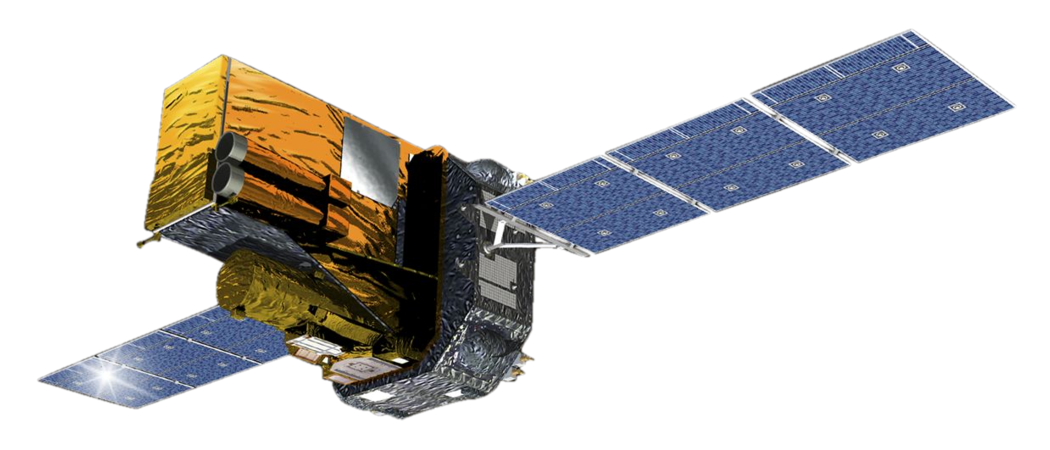
- Artist's impression of the INTEGRAL spacecraft
- Mission type: Astronomy
- Operator: ESA / RKA / NASA
- COSPAR ID: 2002-048A
- SATCAT no.: 27540
- Website: sci.esa.int/integral/
- Mission duration: 10 years (planned); 22 years, 4 months, 11 days (total)

Spacecraft properties
- Manufacturer: Alenia Spazio
- Launch mass: ~ 4,000 kg (8,800 lb)
- Dry mass: ~ 3,450 kg (7,610 lb)
- Payload mass: ~ 2,000 kg (4,400 lb)
- Dimensions: 5.0 × 2.8 × 3.2 m (16.4 × 9.2 × 10.5 ft)

Start of mission
- Launch date: 17 October 2002, 01:33 UTC
- Rocket: Proton-K Blok DM2
- Launch site: Baikonur Site 200/39
- Contractor: Roscosmos

End of mission
- Disposal: Deorbit (planned)
- Declared: 28 February 2025
- Decay date: 2029 (planned)

Orbital parameters
- Reference system: Geocentric
- Regime: Highly elliptical
- Semi-major axis: 81,131 kilometres (50,412 mi)
- Perigee altitude: 3,642 kilometres (2,263 mi)
- Apogee altitude: 145,864 kilometres (90,636 mi)
- Inclination: 88.6962 degrees
- Period: 3,833 minutes
- Epoch: 21 October 2026, 02:01 UTC

Main telescope
- Type: Coded mask telescope
- Diameter: 3.7 metres (12 ft)
- Focal length: ~ 4 metres (13 ft)
- Collecting area: 500 cm^{2} (78 sq in) (SPI, JEM-X); 3,100 cm^{2} (480 sq in) (IBIS)
- Wavelengths: 15 keV to 10 MeV (main); 3 to 35 keV (JEM-X); 500 to 580 nm (OMC)

Instruments
- ACS — AntiCoincidence Shield; IBIS — Imager on-Board the INTEGRAL Satellite; IREM — INTEGRAL Radiation Environment Monitor; JEM-X — Joint European X-Ray Monitor; OMC — Optical Monitor Camera; SPI — SPectrometer for INTEGRAL
- Contemporary ESA insignia (2000s) Horizon 2000 (Science Programme)

Animation of INTEGRAL spacecraft orbit trajectory Earth · INTEGRAL

The INTErnational Gamma-Ray Astrophysics Laboratory (INTEGRAL) was a space telescope for observing gamma rays of energies up to 8 MeV. It was launched by the European Space Agency (ESA) into Earth orbit in 2002, and is designed to provide imaging and spectroscopy of cosmic sources. In the MeV energy range, it is the most sensitive gamma ray observatory in space. It is sensitive to higher energy photons than X-ray instruments such as NuSTAR, the Neil Gehrels Swift Observatory, XMM-Newton, and lower than other gamma-ray instruments such Fermi and HESS.

Photons in INTEGRAL's energy range are emitted by relativistic particles in violent sources, radioactivity from unstable isotopes produced during nucleosynthesis, X-ray binaries, and astronomical transients of all types, including gamma-ray bursts. The spacecraft's instruments have very wide fields of view, which is particularly useful for detecting gamma-ray emission from transient sources as they can continuously monitor large parts of the sky.

INTEGRAL was an ESA mission with additional contributions from European member states including Italy, France, Germany, and Spain. Cooperation partners are the Russian Space Agency with IKI (military CP Command Punkt KW), NASA as well as institutions in Czech Republic and Poland. INTEGRAL was the first astrophysical satellite of ESA with Czech participation.

From June 2023 until the spacecraft's retirement in 2025 INTEGRAL was able to operate despite the loss of its thrusters through the use of its reaction wheels and solar radiation pressure.

== Mission ==
Radiation more energetic than optical light, such as ultraviolet, X-rays, and gamma rays, cannot penetrate Earth's atmosphere, and direct observations must be made from space. INTEGRAL is an observatory, scientists can propose for observing time of their desired target regions, data are public after a proprietary period of up to one year.

INTEGRAL was launched from the Russian Baikonur spaceport, in Kazakhstan. The 2002 launch aboard a Proton-DM2 rocket achieved a 3-day elliptical orbit with an apogee of nearly 160,000 km and a perigee of above 2,000 km, hence mostly beyond radiation belts which would otherwise lead to high instrumental backgrounds from charged-particle activation. The spacecraft and instruments are controlled from ESOC in Darmstadt, Germany, ESA's control centre, through ground stations in Belgium (Redu) and California (Goldstone).

2015: Fuel usage is much lower than predictions. INTEGRAL has far exceeded its 2+3-year planned lifetime, and is set to enter Earth atmosphere in 2029 as a definite end of the mission. Its orbit was adjusted in Jan/Feb 2015 to cause such a safe (southern) reentry (due to lunar/solar perturbations, predicted for 2029), using half the remaining fuel then.

In July 2020 INTEGRAL put itself in safe-mode, and it seemed the thrusters had failed. Since then alternative algorithms to slew and unload the reaction wheels have been developed and tested.

In September 2021 a single event upset triggered a sequence of events that put INTEGRAL into an uncontrolled tumbling state, considered to be a 'mission critical anomaly'. The operations team used the reaction wheels to recover attitude control.

In March 2023, INTEGRAL science operations were extended to the end of 2024, which will be followed by a two-year post-operations phase and further monitoring of the spacecraft until its estimated reentry in February 2029.

Also in March 2023, a new software based safe mode was tested that would use reaction wheels (rather than the failed thrusters).

On 28 February 2025, science observations with the INTEGRAL spacecraft were officially ended.

== Spacecraft ==
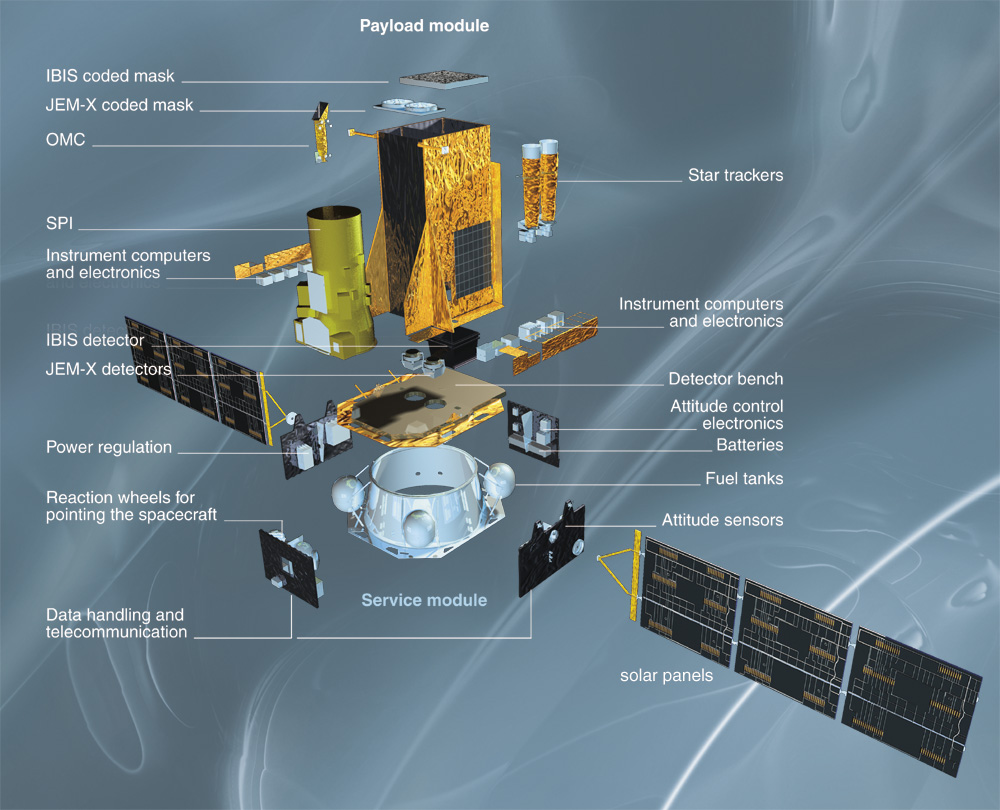
Integral instruments

The spacecraft body ("service module") is a copy of the XMM-Newton body. This saved development costs and simplified integration with infrastructure and ground facilities. An adapter was necessary to mate with the different launch vehicle. The denser instruments used for gamma rays and hard X-rays make INTEGRAL the heaviest scientific payload ever flown by ESA.

The body is constructed largely of composites. Propulsion is by a hydrazine monopropellant system, containing 544 kg of fuel in four exposed tanks. The titanium tanks were charged with gas to 24 bar (2.4 MPa) at 30 °C, and have tank diaphragms. Attitude control is via a star tracker, multiple Sun sensors (ESM), and multiple momentum wheels. The dual solar arrays, spanning 16 meters when deployed and producing 2.4 kW at beginning of life (BoL), are backed up by dual nickel-cadmium battery sets.

The instrument structure ("payload module") is also composite. A rigid base supports the detector assemblies, and an H-shaped structure holds the coded masks approximately 4 meters above their detectors. The payload module can be built and tested independently from the service module, reducing cost.

Alenia Spazio (now Thales Alenia Space Italia) was the spacecraft prime contractor.

== Instruments ==
Four instruments with large fields-of-view are co-aligned on this platform, to study targets across such a wide energy range of almost two orders of magnitude in energy (other astronomy instruments in X-rays or optical cover much smaller ranges of factors of a few at most). Imaging is achieved by coded masks casting a shadowgram onto pixelised cameras; the tungsten masks were provided by the University of Valencia, Spain.

The INTEGRAL imager, IBIS (Imager on-Board the INTEGRAL Satellite) observes from 15 keV (hard X-rays) to 10 MeV (gamma rays). Angular resolution is 12 arcmin, enabling a bright source to be located to better than 1 arcmin. A 95 x 95 mask of rectangular tungsten tiles sits 3.2 meters above the detectors. The detector system contains a forward plane of 128 x 128 Cadmium-Telluride tiles (ISGRI- Integral Soft Gamma-Ray Imager), backed by a 64 x 64 plane of Caesium-Iodide tiles (PICsIT- Pixellated Caesium-Iodide Telescope). ISGRI is sensitive up to 1 MeV, while PICsIT extends to 10 MeV. Both are surrounded by passive shields of tungsten and lead. IBIS was provided by PI institutes in Rome/Italy and Paris/France.

Simplified principle of operation of a HURA hexagonal coded aperture mask used in SPI

The spectrometer aboard INTEGRAL is SPI, the SPectrometer of INTEGRAL. It was conceived and assembled by the French Space Agency CNES, with PI institutes in Toulouse/France and Garching/Germany. It observes radiation between 20 keV and 8 MeV. SPI has a coded mask of hexagonal tungsten tiles, above a detector plane of 19 germanium crystals (also packed hexagonally). The high energy resolution of 2 keV at 1 MeV is capable to resolve all candidate gamma-ray lines. The Ge crystals are actively cooled with a mechanical system of Stirling coolers to about 80K.

IBIS and SPI use active detectors to detect and veto charged particles that lead to background radiation. The SPI ACS (AntiCoincidence Shield) consists of a BGO scintillator blocks surrounding the camera and aperture, detecting all charged particles, and photons exceeding an energy of about 75 keV, that would hit the instrument from directions different from the aperture. A thin layer of plastic scintillator behind the tungsten tiles serves as additional charged-particle detector within the aperture.

The large effective area of the ACS turned out to be useful as an instrument in its own right. Its all-sky coverage and sensitivity make it a natural gamma-ray burst detector, and a valued component of the IPN (InterPlanetary Network).

Dual JEM-X units provide additional information on sources at soft and hard X-rays, from 3 to 35 keV. Aside from broadening the spectral coverage, imaging is more precise due to the shorter wavelength. Detectors are gas scintillators (xenon plus methane) in a microstrip layout, below a mask of hexagonal tiles.

INTEGRAL includes an Optical Monitor (OMC) instrument, sensitive from 500 to 580 nm. It acts as both a framing aid, and can note the activity and state of some brighter targets, e.g. it had been useful to monitor supernova light over months from SN2014J.

The spacecraft also includes a radiation monitor, INTEGRAL Radiation Environment Monitor (IREM), to note the orbital background for calibration purposes. IREM has an electron and a proton channel, though radiation up to cosmic rays can be sensed. Should the background exceed a preset threshold, IREM can shut down the instruments.

== Scientific results ==
INTEGRAL contributes to multi-messenger astronomy, detecting gamma rays from the first merger of two neutron stars observed in gravitational waves, and from a fast radio burst.

Due to IBIS's high sensitivity, a detailed time-resolved spectroscopy of a GRB with a fluence in range of 20-200 keV was made possible for the first time with the observation of GRB 030131 by INTEGRAL.

By 2025, 2258 refereed papers were published that benefit from INTEGRAL data which corresponds on average to one paper every 3.5 days.

== See also ==
- BOOTES
- List of X-ray space telescopes
- High-energy astronomy
