= Upper limit =

Upper limit may refer to:

- Limit superior
- Confidence interval
- One-sided limit
- Maximum
