= Daniel E. Reichart =

American astronomer

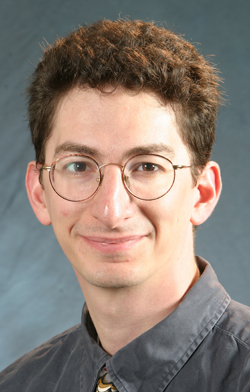
- Education: University of Chicago, Ph.D 2000; Pennsylvania State University, B.S. 1996
- Known for: robotic telescopes, optical and radio; genetic algorithm-based model fitting; image processing and measurement algorithms; gamma-ray bursts; introductory astronomy education
- Scientific career
- Fields: Astronomy
- Workplaces: University of North Carolina at Chapel Hill; California Institute of Technology; University of Chicago
- Doctoral advisor: Donald Q. Lamb

Daniel E. Reichart is an American astronomer. Reichart's dissertation research on distant, cosmic explosions called gamma-ray bursts was ranked by Science Magazine as one of the top ten discoveries in science in 1999, and in 2003 earned him the Robert J. Trumpler Award, for top astrophysics dissertation research in North America. In 2005, he and his students discovered the most distant explosion in the universe yet known, a gamma-ray burst that occurred 12.9 billion years ago, when the universe was only 6% its current age.

Reichart received B.S. degrees in Astronomy & Astrophysics, Physics, and Mathematics, and a minor in History, from the Pennsylvania State University in 1996. He received M.S. and Ph.D. degrees in Astronomy & Astrophysics from the University of Chicago in 1998 and 2000. He then won a prestigious Hubble Postdoctoral Fellowship, which he took to the California Institute of Technology. He joined the University of North Carolina at Chapel Hill in 2002, where he is now a professor of Physics and Astronomy.

To date, Reichart has published 136 journal articles, including five in Nature and Science magazines, and has raised over $12 million for his research. He is also the recipient of the Carl Sagan Award for Excellence in Teaching, the Nathan Sugarman Award for Excellence in Research, the Donn MacMinn Award for Service beyond the Walls of the university, and Ernest F. Fullam Award of Dudley Observatory.

Since arriving at the University of North Carolina at Chapel Hill, Reichart has been building “Skynet”. Funded primarily by the National Science Foundation, Skynet is an ever-growing collection of fully automated, or robotic, professional-quality telescopes under the control of software developed by Reichart's team. Currently, Skynet spans four continents and five countries, and consists of nearly twenty optical telescopes, with mirrors ranging in size from 14 inches to 1 meter in diameter, as well as a 20-meter diameter radio telescope. Skynet publishes in peer-reviewed journals, on average, once every three weeks, and simultaneously serves tens of thousands of students, of all ages, graduate school through elementary school.

Reichart suffered first and second-degree burns to his arms and face on November 2, 2017, while trying to put out a fire at the base of Davie Poplar when a small explosion engulfed Reichart.
