= Venera 12 =

1978 Soviet uncrewed mission which successfully touched down on Venus

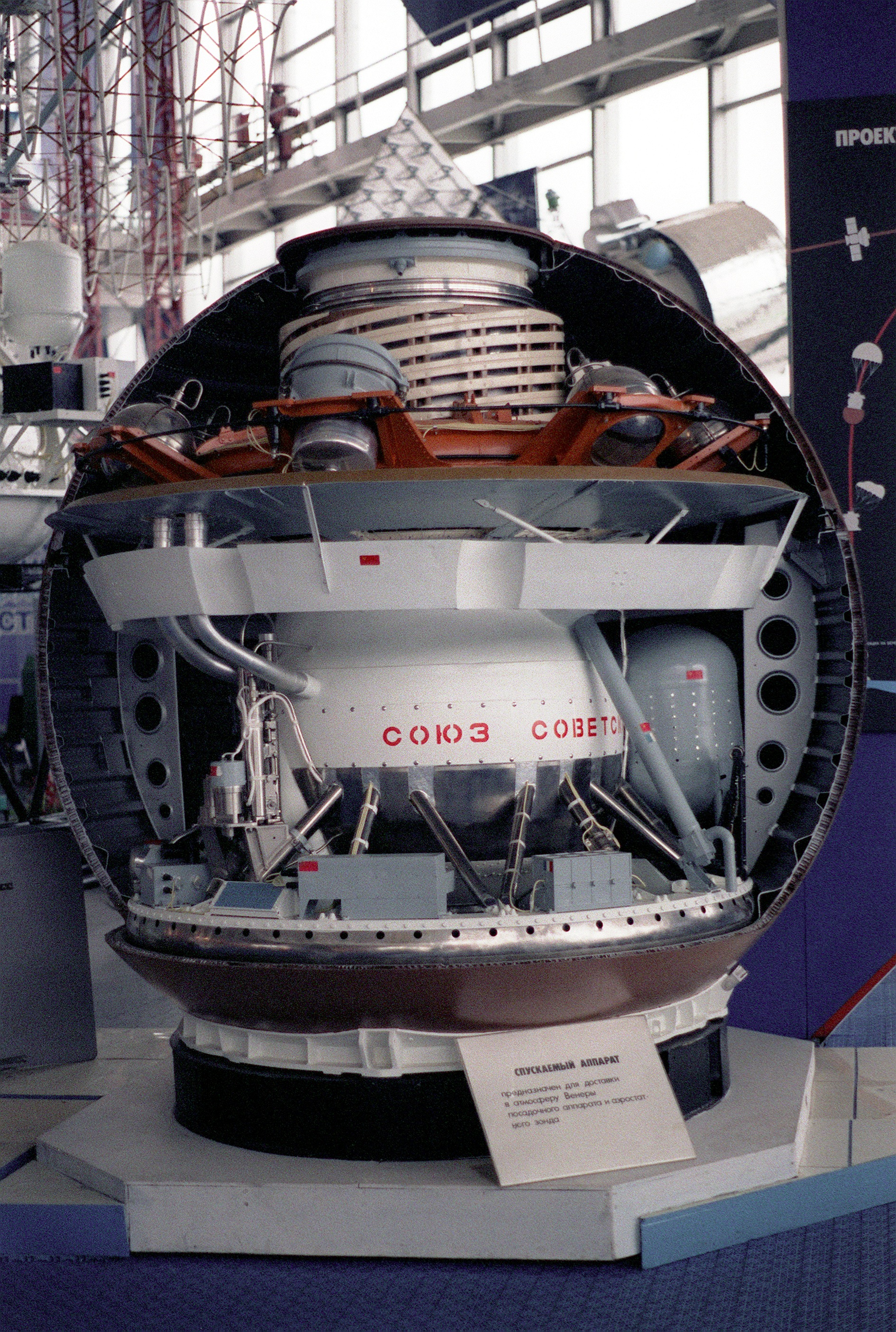
- Venera 12 model
- Operator: Soviet Academy of Sciences
- COSPAR ID: 1978-086A; 1978-086C
- SATCAT no.: 11025; 12028
- Mission duration: Travel: 3 months and 6 days Lander: 110 minutes

Spacecraft properties
- Spacecraft type: 4V-1
- Bus: 4MV
- Launch mass: 4,457.9 kg (9,828 lb)
- Dry mass: 1,600 kg (3,500 lb)
- Dimensions: 2.3 m × 2.7 m × 5.7 m (7.5 ft × 8.9 ft × 18.7 ft)

Start of mission
- Launch date: 14 September 1978, 02:25:13 UTC
- Rocket: Proton-K/D-1 8K82K
- Launch site: Baikonur 81/23

End of mission
- Last contact: 18 April 1980

Orbital parameters
- Reference system: Geocentric
- Regime: Low Earth
- Semi-major axis: 6,569 kilometres (4,082 mi)
- Perigee altitude: 177 kilometres (110 mi)
- Apogee altitude: 205 kilometres (127 mi)
- Inclination: 51.5°

Flyby of Venus
- Spacecraft component: Venera 12 flight platform
- Closest approach: 19 December 1978
- Distance: ~35,000 kilometers (22,000 mi)

Venus lander
- Spacecraft component: Venera 12 descent craft
- Landing date: 21 December 1978, 03:30
- Landing site: 7°S 294°E

The Venera 12 (Russian: Венера-12 meaning Venus 12) was an uncrewed Soviet space mission designed to explore the planet Venus. Venera 12 was launched on 14 September 1978 at 02:25:13 UTC.

After separating from its flight platform on 19 December 1978, the Venera 12 lander entered the Venus atmosphere two days later at 11.2 kilometres per second (7.0 mi/s). During its descent, the lander employed aerodynamic braking followed by parachute braking, ending with atmospheric braking. After a nearly one-hour descent, a soft landing was made at 06:30 Moscow time (0330 UT) on 21 December. Touchdown speed was 7–8 metres per second (23–26 ft/s); landing coordinates are 7°S 294°E. After touchdown, the lander transmitted data to the flight platform for about 110 minutes until the flight platform, which remained in a heliocentric orbit, moved out of range. Venera 11 and 12 carried identical instruments.

== Flight platform ==
The Venera 12 flight platform carried solar wind detectors, ionosphere electron instruments, and two gamma ray burst detectors – the Soviet-built KONUS and the French-built SIGNE 2. The SIGNE 2 detectors were simultaneously flown on Venera 12 and Prognoz 7 to allow for triangulation of gamma ray sources. Before and after the Venus flyby, Venera 11 and Venera 12 yielded detailed time-profiles for 143 gamma-ray bursts, resulting in the first ever catalog of such events. The last gamma-ray burst reported by Venera 12 occurred on 5 January 1980. Venera 12 used its ultraviolet spectrometer to study comet Bradfield (C/1979 Y1) on 13 February 1980, and reported spectrophotometric data until 19 March 1980.

The list of flight platform instruments and experiments are:

- 30–166 nm Extreme UV spectrometer
- Compound plasma spectrometer
- KONUS Gamma-ray burst detector
- SNEG Gamma-ray burst detector
- Magnetometer
- 4 Semiconductor counters
- 2 Gas-discharge counters
- 4 Scintillation counters
- Hemispherical proton telescope

The active phase of the science mission for the flight platform ended in April 1980. Venera 12 is currently in heliocentric orbit, with perihelion of 0.69 AU, aphelion of 1.01 AU, eccentricity of 0.19, inclination of 2.3 degrees and orbital period of 284 days.

== Lander ==
The Venera 12 descent craft carried instruments designed to study the detailed chemical composition of the atmosphere, the nature of the clouds, and the thermal balance of the atmosphere. These instruments included a gas chromatograph to measure the composition of the Venus atmosphere, instruments to study scattered solar radiation and soil composition, and a device named Groza which was designed to measure atmospheric electrical discharges. Results reported included evidence of lightning and thunder, a high ^{36}Ar/^{40}Ar ratio, and the discovery of carbon monoxide at low altitudes.

Each of the Venera 11 and Venera 12 included landers with a pair of cameras, each of which was designed for color imaging. A design flaw prevented the lens caps from separating, resulting in all cameras failing to capture and return images.

The list of lander experiments and instruments are:

- Backscatter nephelometer
- Mass spectrometer – MKh-6411
- Gas chromatograph – Sigma
- X-ray fluorospectrometer
- 360° scanning photometer – IOAV
- Spectrometer (430–1170 nm)
- Microphone / anemometer
- Low-Frequency radio sensor
- 4 Thermometers
- 3 Barometers
- Accelerometer – Bizon
- Penetrometer – PrOP-V
- Soil Analysis Device
- 2 Color Cameras
- Small solar batteries – MSB

== See also ==
- List of missions to Venus
- Timeline of artificial satellites and space probes
