= BeppoSAX =

Italian-Dutch satellite used for X-ray astronomy

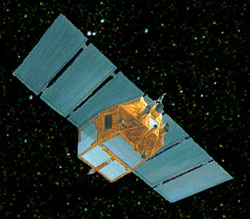
- Artist's conception of BeppoSax in space (credit: the Italian Space Agency (ASI) and BeppoSAX Science Data Center (SDC))
- Names: Satellite per Astronomia X
- Mission type: X-ray astronomy
- Operator: ASI / NIVR
- COSPAR ID: 1996-027A
- SATCAT no.: 23857
- Website: www.asdc.asi.it/bepposax/
- Mission duration: 7 years

Spacecraft properties
- Manufacturer: Alenia; CNR
- Launch mass: 3,100 lb (1,400 kg)
- Payload mass: 1,060 lb (480 kg)
- Dimensions: 3.6 m × 2.7 m (11.8 ft × 8.9 ft)
- Power: 800 W

Start of mission
- Launch date: 04:31, April 30, 1996 (UTC)
- Rocket: Atlas-Centaur AC-78
- Launch site: LC-36B, Cape Canaveral

End of mission
- Disposal: decommissioned
- Deactivated: 13:38, April 30, 2002 (UTC)
- Decay date: 22:06, April 29, 2003 (UTC)

Orbital parameters
- Reference system: Geocentric
- Regime: Low Earth
- Eccentricity: 0.00136
- Perigee altitude: 575 km (357 mi)
- Apogee altitude: 594 km (369 mi)
- Inclination: 4 degrees
- Period: 96.4 minutes
- Epoch: 30 April 1996, 03:31 UTC

Main telescope
- Type: approximated Wolter type I Coded mask telescope (WFC)
- Diameter: 6.8 to 16.2 cm (2.7 to 6.4 in)
- Focal length: 1.85 m (6.1 ft)
- Collecting area: 22 to 600 cm^{2} (3.4 to 93.0 sq in)
- Wavelengths: X-ray to gamma ray, 12 nm–4 pm (0.1–300 keV)

Instruments
LECS	Low Energy Concentrator Spectrometer
MECS	Medium Energy Concentrator Spectrometer
HPGSPC	High Pressure Gas Scintillation Proportional Counter
PDS	Phoswich Detector System
WFC	Wide Field Camera

BeppoSAX was an Italian–Dutch satellite for X-ray astronomy which played a crucial role in resolving the origin of gamma-ray bursts (GRBs), the most energetic events known in the universe. It was the first X-ray mission capable of simultaneously observing targets over more than 3 orders-of-magnitude of energy, from 0.1 to 300 kiloelectronvolts (keV) with relatively large area, good (for the time) energy resolution and imaging capabilities (with a spatial resolution of 1 arc minute between 0.1 and 10 keV). BeppoSAX was a major programme of the Italian Space Agency (ASI) with the participation of the Netherlands Agency for Aerospace Programmes (NIVR). The prime contractor for the space segment was Alenia while Nuova Telespazio led the development of the ground segment. Most of the scientific instruments were developed by the Italian National Research Council (CNR) while the Wide Field Cameras were developed by the Netherlands Institute for Space Research (SRON) and the LECS was developed by the astrophysics division of the European Space Agency's ESTEC facility.

BeppoSAX was named in honour of the Italian physicist Giuseppe "Beppo" Occhialini. SAX stands for "Satellite per Astronomia a raggi X" or "Satellite for X-ray Astronomy".

X-ray observations cannot be performed from ground-based telescopes, since Earth's atmosphere blocks most of the incoming radiation. One of BeppoSAX's main achievements was the identification of numerous gamma-ray bursts with extra-galactic objects.

Launched by an Atlas-Centaur on 30 April 1996 into a low inclination (<4 degree) low-Earth orbit, the expected operating life of two years was extended to April 30, 2002, due to high scientific interest in the mission and the continued good technical status. After this date, the orbit started to decay rapidly and various subsystems were starting to fail making it no longer worthwhile to conduct scientific observations.

On April 29, 2003, the satellite ended its life falling into the Pacific Ocean.

== Spacecraft characteristics ==
BeppoSAX was a three axes stabilized satellite, with a pointing accuracy of 1'. The main attitude constraint derived from the need to maintain the normal to the solar arrays within 30° from the Sun, with occasional excursions to 45° for some WFC observations. Due to the low orbit the satellite was in view of the ground station of Malindi for only a limited fraction of the time. Data was stored on-board on a tape unit with a capacity of 450 Mbits and transmitted to ground every orbit during station passage. The average data rate available to instruments was about 60 kbit/s, but peak rates of up to 100 kbit/s can be retained for part of each orbit. With the solar panels closed, the spacecraft was 3.6 m in height and 2.7 m in diameter. The total mass amounts to 1400 kg, with a payload of 480 kg.

The structure of the satellite consisted of three basic functional subassemblies:

- the Service Module, in the lower part of the spacecraft, which housed all the subsystems and the electronic boxes of the scientific instruments.
- the Payload Module, which housed the scientific instruments and the star trackers.
- the Thermal Shade Structure, that enclosed the Payload Module.

The primary sub-systems of the satellite are:

- The Attitude Orbital Control System (AOCS), that performed attitude determination and manoeuvred and operated the Reaction Control Subsystem in charge of orbit recovering. It included redundant magnetometers, Sun acquisition sensors, three star trackers, six gyroscopes (three of which are for redundancy), three magnetic torquers and four reaction wheels, all controlled by a dedicated computer. The AOCS ensured a pointing accuracy of 1' during source observations and manoeuvres with a slew rate of 10° per min.
- The On Board Data Handler (OBDH) was the core for data management and system control on the satellite and it also managed the communication interfaces between the satellite and the ground station. Its computer supervised all subsystem processor activities, such as those of each instrument, and the communication busses.

== Instrumentation ==
BeppoSAX contained five science instruments:

- Low Energy Concentrator Spectrometer (LECS)
- Medium Energy Concentrator Spectrometer (MECS)
- High Pressure Gas Scintillation Proportional Counter (HPGSPC)
- Phoswich Detector System (PDS)
- Wide Field Camera (WFC)

The first four instruments (often called Narrow Field Instruments or NFI) point to the same direction, and allow observations of an object in a broad energy band of 0.1 to 300 keV (16 to 48,000 attojoules (aJ)).

The WFC contained two coded aperture cameras operating in the 2 to 30 keV (320 to 4,800 aJ) range and each covering a region of 40 x 40 degrees (20 by 20 degrees full width at half maximum) on the sky. The WFC was complemented by the shielding of PDS which had a (nearly) all-sky view in the 100 to 600 keV (16,000 to 96,000 aJ) band, ideal for detecting gamma-ray bursts (GRB).

The PDS shielding has poor angular resolution. In theory, after a GRB was seen in the PDS, the position was refined first with the WFC. However, due to the many spikes in the PDS, in practice a GRB was found using the WFC, often corroborated by a BATSE-signal. The position up to arcminute precision - depending on the signal to noise ratio of the burst - was found using the deconvoluted WFC-image. The coordinates were speedily sent out as an International Astronomical Union (IAU) and Gamma-ray burst Coordinate Network Circular. After this, immediate follow-up observations with the NFI and optical observatories around the world allowed accurate positioning of the GRB and detailed observations of the X-ray, optical and radio afterglow.

The MECS contained three identical gas scintillation proportional counters operating in the 1.3 to 10 keV (208 to 1602 aJ) range. On 6 May 1997 one of the three identical MECS units was lost when a fault developed in the High Voltage power supply.

The LECS was similar to the MECS units, expect that it had a thinner window that allows photons with lower energies down to 0.1 keV (16 aJ) to pass through and operated in a "driftless" mode which is necessary to detect the lowest energy X-rays as these would be lost in the low field regime near the entrance window of a conventional GSPC. The LECS data above 4 keV (641 aJ) is not usable due to calibration issues probably caused by the driftless design. The LECS and MECS had imaging capability, whereas the high-energy narrow field instruments were non-imaging.

The HPGSPC was also a gas scintillation proportional counter, operating at a high (5 atmospheres) pressure. High pressure equals high density, and dense photon-stopping material allowed detection of photons up to 120 keV (19,000 aJ).

The PDS was a crystal (sodium iodide / caesium iodide) scintillator detector capable of absorbing photons up to 300 keV (48,000 aJ). The spectral resolution of the PDS was rather modest when compared to the gas detectors, but the low background counting rate resulting from the low inclination BeppoSAX orbit and good background rejection capabilities meant that the PDS remains one of the most sensitive high-energy instruments flown.

== Gallery ==
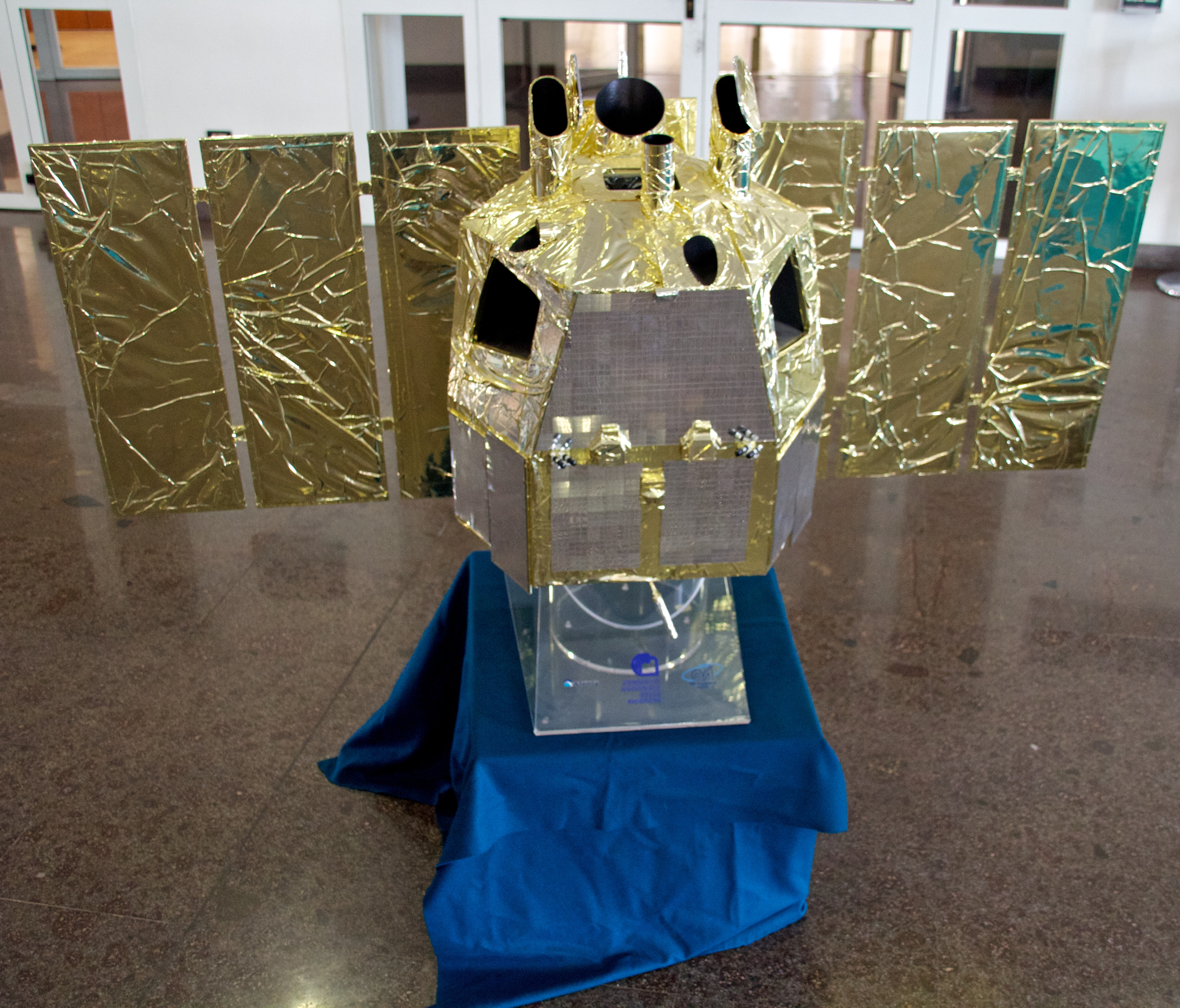
A model of BeppoSAX

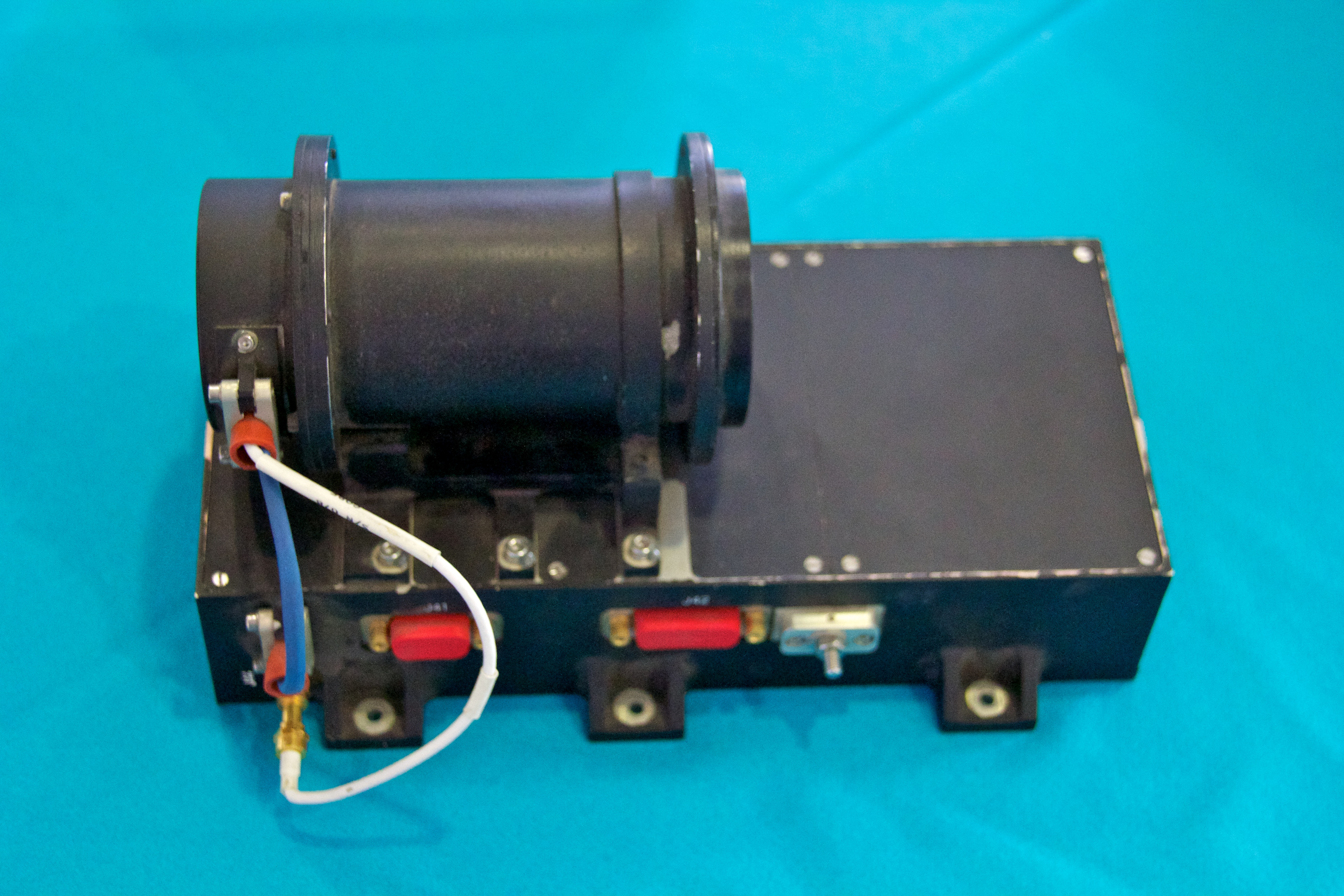
BeppoSAX particle monitor

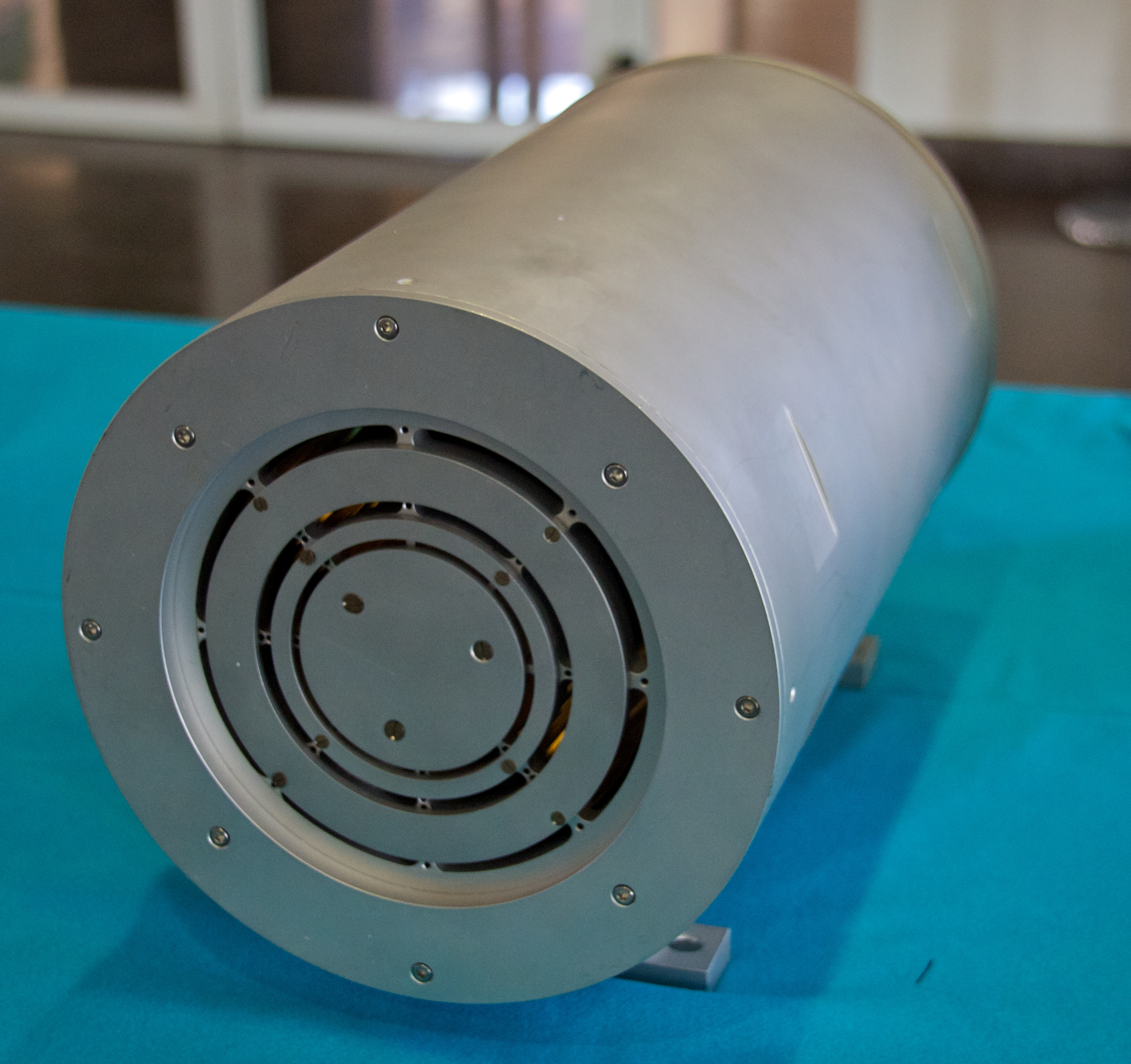
BeppoSAX X-ray concentrator mirror unit

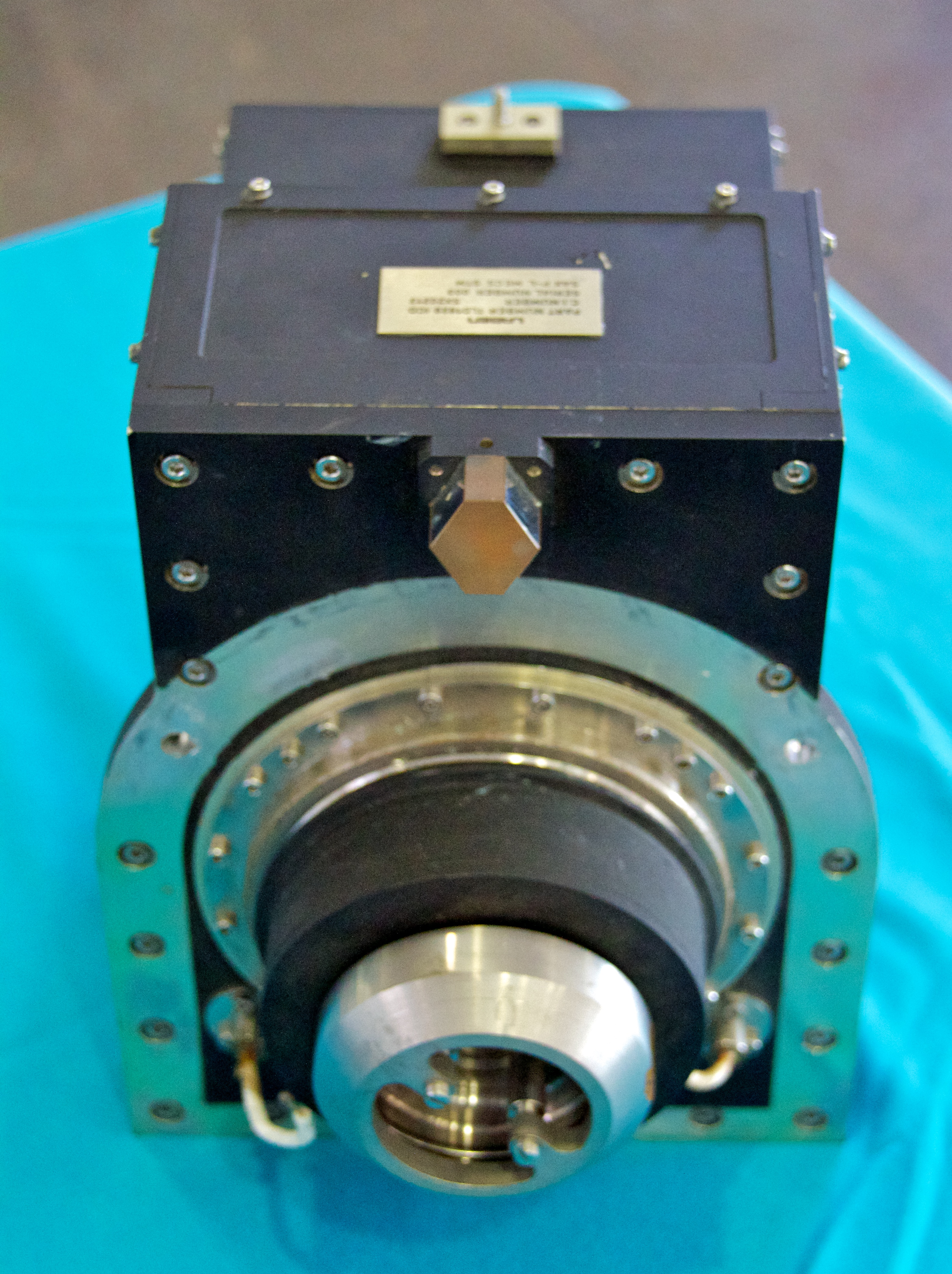
BeppoSAX Medium Energy GAS scintellation Proportional Counter

== Other General References ==
- BeppoSAX Mission Overview, Astronomy & Astrophysics Supplement Series, Vol. 122, April II 1997, 299-307
- De Kort, N., Ruimteonderzoek, de horizon voorbij, Veen/SRON, 2003
- Low Energy Concentrator Spectrometer (LECS) 0.1-10 keV, A&A Supplement series, Vol. 122, April II 1997, 309-326
- Medium Energy Concentrator Spectrometer (MECS) 0.1-10 keV, A&A Supplement series, Vol. 122, April II 1997, 327-340
- High pressure Gas Scintillator Proportional Counter (HPGSPC), A&A Supplement series, Vol. 122, April II 1997, 341-356
- Phoswich Detection System (PDS) 15-300 keV, A&A Supplement series, Vol. 122, April II 1997, 357-369
- Wide Field Camera 2-28 keV, A&A Supplement series, Vol. 125, November 1997, 557-572
- Piro, L. e.a., SAX Observer's Handbook, 1995
