= Peryton (disambiguation) =

The peryton is a mythical creature with features of a stag and a bird.

Peryton may also refer to:

- Peryton (Dungeons & Dragons), a creature in Dungeons & Dragons
- Peryton (astronomy), a type of Fast Radio Burst that was found to originate in microwave ovens
