= Victoria Kaspi =

Canadian astrophysicist

Vicky Kaspi CC FRS FRSC
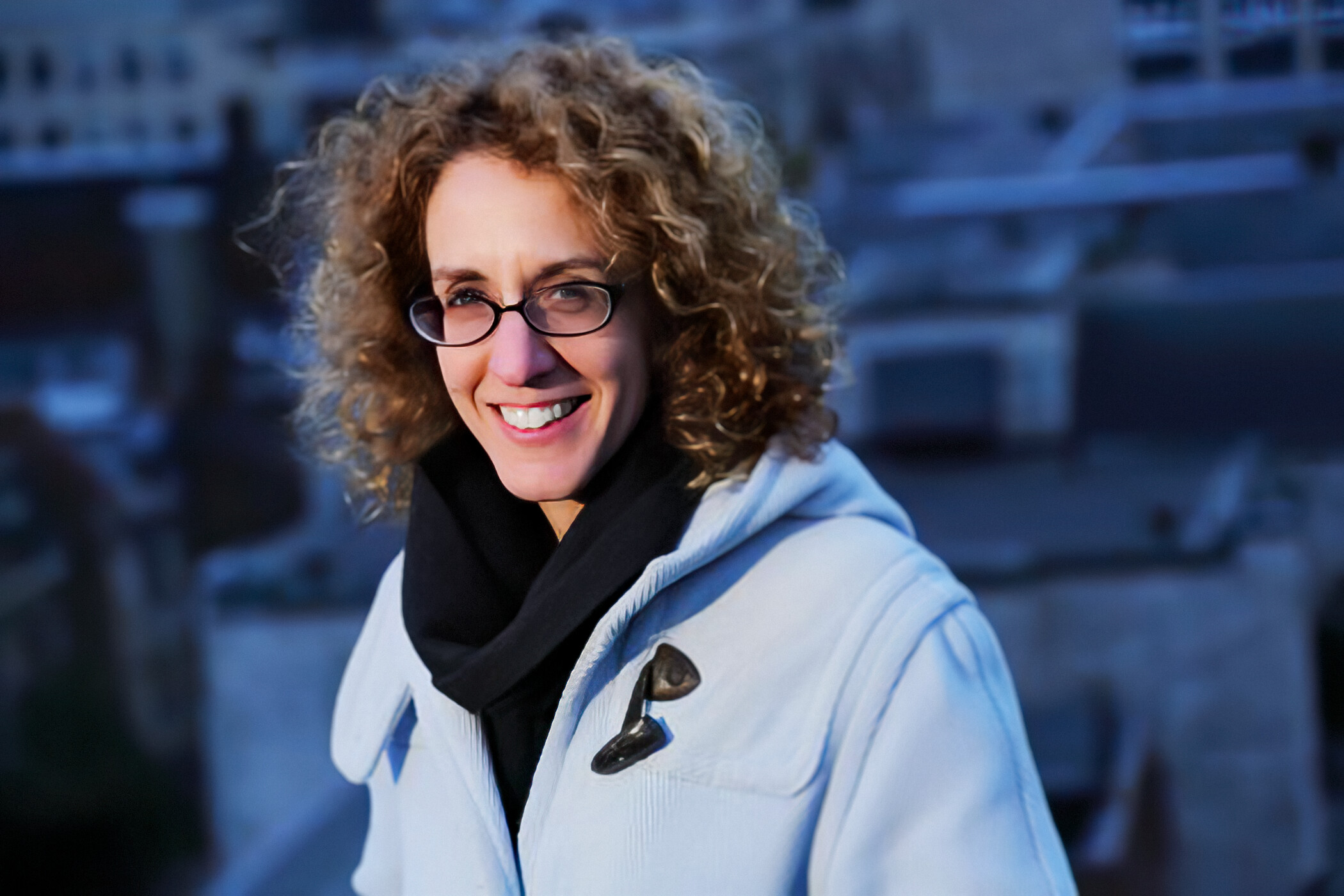
- Born: Victoria Michelle Kaspi; June 30, 1967 (age 59); Austin, Texas
- Education: McGill University (BS); Princeton University (PhD)
- Known for: Canadian Hydrogen Intensity Mapping Experiment
- Spouse: David Langleben
- Awards: Albert Einstein World Award of Science (2022); Nature's 10 (2019); Killam Prize (2015); NAS member (2010); Rutherford Medal (2007); Herzberg Medal (2016); Shaw Prize (2021)
- Scientific career
- Fields: Pulsars; Neutron stars Astrophysics
- Workplaces: McGill University; California Institute of Technology; Jet Propulsion Laboratory; Massachusetts Institute of Technology
- Thesis: Applications of pulsar timing (1993)
- Doctoral advisor: Joseph Taylor
- Doctoral students: Anne Archibald
- Website: www.physics.mcgill.ca/~vkaspi

Victoria Michelle Kaspi (born June 30, 1967) is a Canadian astrophysicist and a professor at McGill University. Her research primarily concerns neutron stars and pulsars.

== Early life and education ==
Kaspi was born in Austin, Texas, but her family moved to Canada when she was seven years old. She completed her undergraduate studies at McGill in 1989, and went to Princeton University for her graduate studies, completing her PhD in 1993 supervised by Nobel Prize-winning astrophysicist Joseph Taylor.

== Career and research ==
After a postdoc position at the California Institute of Technology, the Jet Propulsion Laboratory, and a junior faculty position at Massachusetts Institute of Technology, she took a faculty position at McGill in 1999. At McGill, she held one of McGill's first Canada Research Chairs, and in 2006 she was named the Lorne Trottier Professor of Astrophysics. She is also a Fellow in the Canadian Institute for Advanced Research and the American Astronomical Society.

In 2015, Kaspi founded the McGill Space Institute and serves as its director. She has also served as director of the Gravity and the Extreme Universe program at the Canadian Institute for Advanced Research since 2017, and holds the title of Distinguished James McGill Professor.

Kaspi's observations of the pulsar associated with supernova remnant G11.2–0.3 in the constellation Sagittarius, using the Chandra X-ray Observatory, showed that the pulsar was at the precise center of the supernova, which had been observed in 386 CE by the Chinese. This pulsar was only the second known pulsar to be associated with a supernova remnant, the first being the one in the Crab Nebula, and her studies greatly strengthened the conjectured relationship between pulsars and supernovae. Additionally, this observation cast into doubt previous methods of dating pulsars by their spin rate; these methods gave the pulsar an age that was 12 times too high to match the supernova.

Kaspi's research with the Rossi X-ray Timing Explorer showed that soft gamma repeaters, astronomical sources of irregular gamma ray bursts, and anomalous X-ray pulsars, slowly rotating pulsars with high magnetic fields, could both be explained as magnetars.

She also helped discover the pulsar with the fastest known rotation rate, PSR J1748-2446ad, star clusters with a high concentration of pulsars, and (using the Green Bank Telescope) the "cosmic recycling" of a slow-spinning pulsar into a much faster millisecond pulsar.

As part of her doctoral work with Joseph Taylor, Kaspi conducted high-precision timing of millisecond pulsars B1855+09 and B1937+21 using the Arecibo Observatory. This work produced the first upper limit on the energy density of a stochastic gravitational wave background using pulsar timing array techniques, constraining Ω_{g}h^{2} < 6 × 10^{−8} at 95% confidence. This result established the methodology later adopted by collaborations such as NANOGrav, the European Pulsar Timing Array, and the Parkes Pulsar Timing Array.

In 2013, Kaspi's research group reported the first observation of an "anti-glitch"—a sudden spin-down event—in the magnetar 1E 2259+586, published in Nature. This was contrary to all previously observed pulsar glitches, which involve sudden spin-ups, and provided new constraints on the internal structure of neutron stars.

Kaspi is a lead scientist on the Canadian Hydrogen Intensity Mapping Experiment (CHIME) Fast Radio Burst (FRB) project. Under her leadership, the CHIME/FRB collaboration detected hundreds of FRBs, dramatically expanding the known population and enabling statistical studies of their properties. This work contributed to her recognition as one of Nature's 10 people who mattered in science in 2019.

=== Awards and honours ===
- 1989: Anne Molson Gold Medal in Mathematics and Natural Philosophy, McGill University
- 1998: Annie J. Cannon Award in Astronomy of the American Astronomical Society
- 2004: Herzberg Medal of the Canadian Association of Physicists
- 2006: Steacie Prize
- 2007: Rutherford Memorial Medal of the Royal Society of Canada
- 2009: Prix Marie-Victorin, the highest scientific award of the province of Québec
- 2010: Elected a Fellow of the Royal Society (FRS).
- 2010: Elected a member of the National Academy of Sciences of the United States
- 2010: Natural Sciences and Engineering Research Council (NSERC) John C. Polanyi Award
- 2013: Peter G. Martin Award of Canadian Astronomical Society
- 2013: Queen Elizabeth II Diamond Jubilee Medal
- 2014: Elected a Fellow of American Physical Society
- 2015: Elected member American Academy of Arts & Sciences
- 2015: Izaak Walton Killam Memorial Prize
- 2016: Gerhard Herzberg Canada Gold Medal for Science and Engineering, the first woman to receive this prize.
- 2016: Companion of the Order of Canada, Canada's second highest civilian honour.
- 2017: Fonds de recherche du Québec, Prix d’excellence
- 2019: Kaspi was recognized by Nature as one Nature's 10 for her work on discovering Fast Radio Bursts with the CHIME telescope.
- 2021: Bakerian Medal of the Royal Society
- 2021: Shaw Prize
- 2021: Lancelot M. Berkeley Prize for Meritorious Work in Astronomy, American Astronomical Society
- 2022: Albert Einstein World Award of Science

== Personal life ==
Kaspi is Jewish. Her husband, David Langleben, is a cardiologist at McGill and at the Sir Mortimer B. Davis Jewish General Hospital in Montreal.
