= FRB 180916.J0158+65 =

Fast radio burst from 457 Mly away

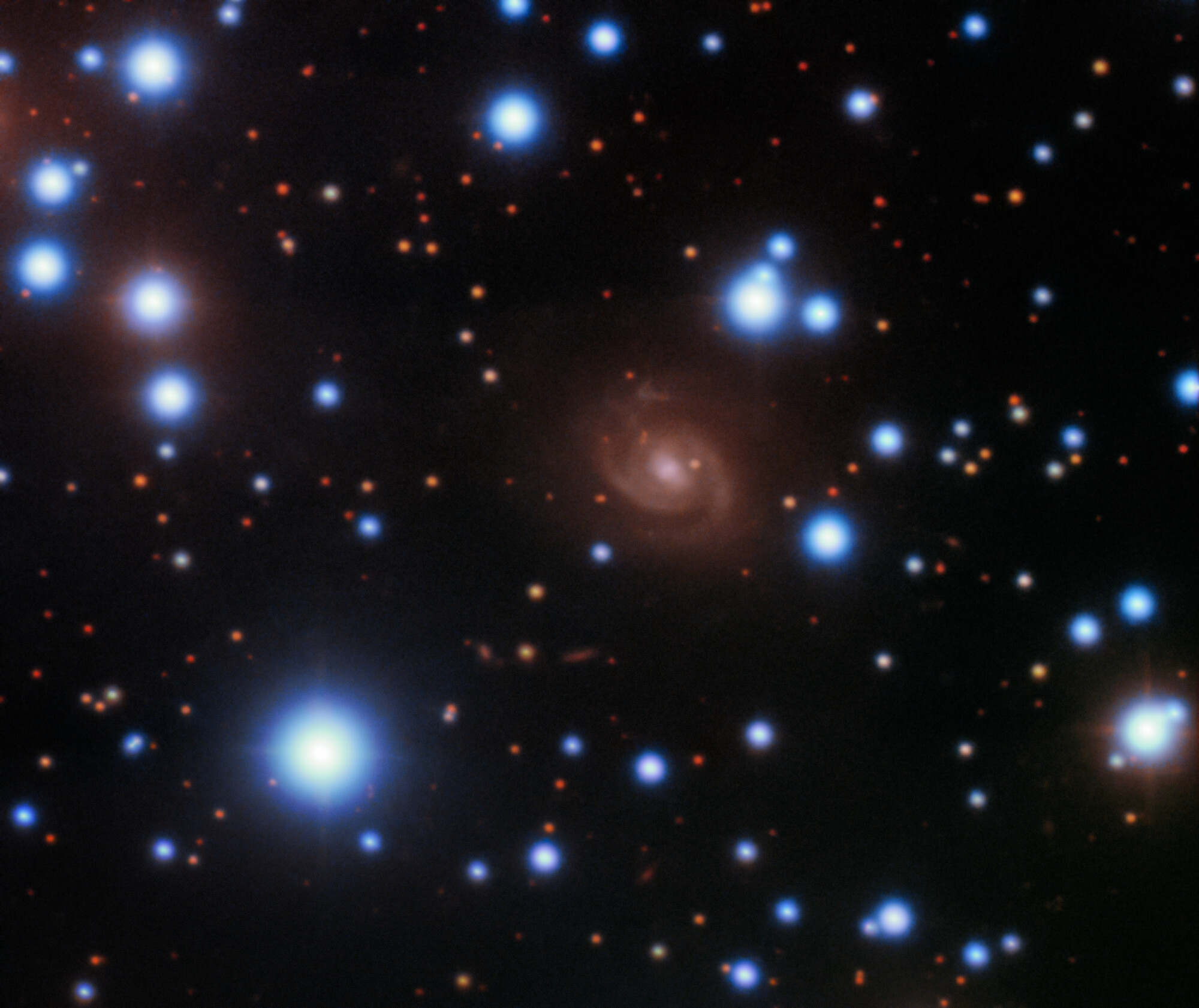
- Event type: FRB 20180916B
- Fast radio burst
- Date: 19 June 2019
- Instrument: CHIME
- Constellation: Cassiopeia
- Right ascension: 01^{h} 58^{m} 00.7502^{s}
- Declination: +65° 43′ 00.3152″
- Epoch: J2000
- Distance: 486.0 ± 2.9 Mly (149.0 ± 0.9 Mpc) (Note: This is the luminosity distance. An angular size-based estimate is also given in the paper, as 454.7 ± 2.6 Mly (139.4 ± 0.8 Mpc).)
- Redshift: 0.0337 ± 0.0002
- Host: SDSS J015800.28+654253.0
- Other designations: FRB 180916.J0158+65

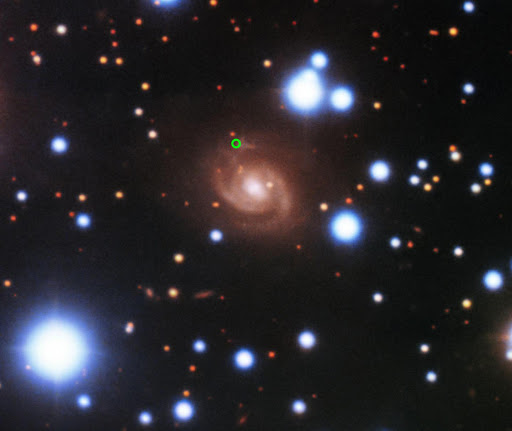
SDSS J015800.28+654253.0., a host galaxy of FRB 20180916B (green circle)

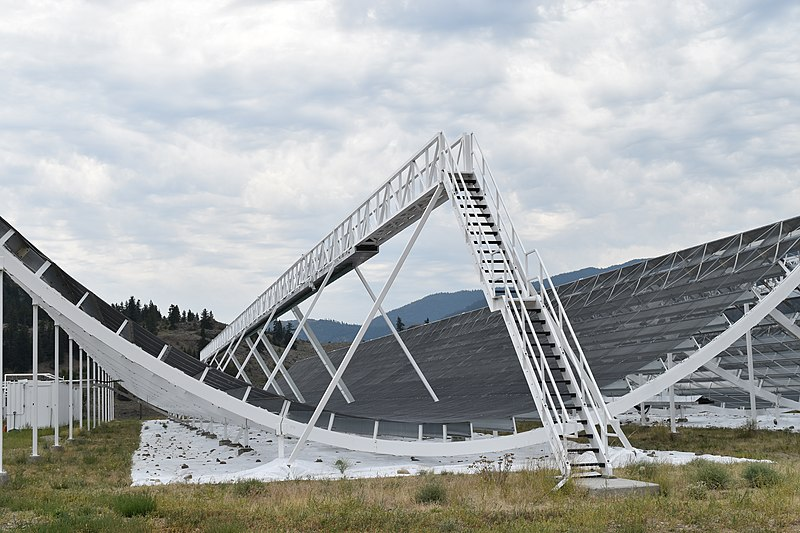
CHIME helped detect FRB 20180916B

FRB 20180916B (previously known as FRB 180916.J0158+65, and less formally known as FRB 180916 or "R3"), is a repeating fast radio burst (FRB) discovered in 2018 by astronomers at the Canadian Hydrogen Intensity Mapping Experiment (CHIME) Telescope. According to a study published in the 9 January 2020 issue of the journal Nature, CHIME astronomers, in cooperation with the radio telescopes at European VLBI Network (VLBI) and the optical telescope Gemini North on Mauna Kea, Hawaii, were able to pinpoint the source of FRB 180916 to a location within a Milky Way-like galaxy named SDSS J015800.28+654253.0. This places the source at redshift 0.0337, approximately 457 million light-years from the Solar System.

== Periodicity ==
Prior to the publication of the study in Nature, only two types of FRBs had been observed: non-repeaters and repeaters. Non-repeaters are 'one-off' FRBs, possibly associated with catastrophic stellar events. In contrast, repeaters are not one-off, but instead manifest recurring unpredictable, sporadic, and irregular radiation bursts; their sources are less well understood. FRB 180916 seems to represent a third and new type of FRB that may be termed periodic repeater. The radiation activity of FRB 180916 repeats over a period of 16.35 +/-0.18 days. Broadly, FRB 180916 emits a burst of radiation for approximately four days followed by an inactive period of about 12 days, then the cycle repeats. Additional follow-up studies of the repeating FRB by the Swift XRT and UVOT instruments were reported on 4 February 2020; by the Sardinia Radio Telescope (SRT) and Medicina Northern Cross Radio Telescope (MNC), on 17 February 2020; and, by the Galileo telescope in Asiago, also on 17 February 2020. Further observations were made by the Chandra X-ray Observatory on 3 and 18 December, 2019, with no significant x-ray emissions detected at the FRB 180916 location, or from the host galaxy SDSS J015800.28+654253.0. On 6 April 2020, follow-up studies by the Global MASTER-Net were reported on The Astronomer's Telegram and, on 4 June 2020, further follow-up studies were reported with the Giant Metrewave Radio Telescope (uGMRT). On 7 June 2020, astronomers from Jodrell Bank Observatory reported possible evidence that FRB 121102 exhibits the same radio burst behavior ("radio bursts observed in a window lasting approximately 90 days followed by a silent period of 67 days") every 157 days, suggesting that the bursts may be associated with "the orbital motion of a massive star, a neutron star or a black hole". This behavior is nearly "10 times longer than the 16-day periodicity" exhibited by FRB 180916. In March 2021, another burst from the FRB was reported. On 25 August 2021, further observations were reported.

== Structure ==
The 4-day radiation burst is not homogeneous but is instead characterized by a pattern of sub-bursts. The pattern of radiation activity within the four-day bursts is never exactly repeated. However, there is enough similarity (i.e. alignment of the sub-bursts from period to period) to suggest that they form part of an original repeating pattern with internal structure of some complexity. In March 2021, astronomers reported that the area producing pulses of FRB 180916 is about 1 kilometre (0.62 miles) in scale, based on studies at extremely short timescales.
