= SGR 1935+2154 =

Soft gamma repeater in the constellation Vulpecula

Observation data Epoch J2000 Equinox ICRS
- Constellation: Vulpecula
- Right ascension: 19^{h} 34^{m} 55.68^{s}
- Declination: 21° 53′ 48.2″

Astrometry
| Distance | 21,500–28,400 ly (6,600–8,800 pc) |

Details
| Radius | 4.35+1.95 −1.35 km |

Database references
| SIMBAD | data |

Other designations

SGR 1935+2154 (or SGR J1935+2154) is a soft gamma repeater (SGR) and ancient stellar remnant, in the constellation Vulpecula, originally discovered in 2014 by the Neil Gehrels Swift Observatory. Currently, the SGR-phenomena and the related anomalous X-ray pulsars (AXP) are explained as arising from magnetars.

On 28 April 2020, this remnant about 30,000 light-years away in our Milky Way galaxy was observed to be associated with a very powerful radio pulse known as a fast radio burst or FRB (designated FRB 200428), and a related X-ray flare. The detection is notable as the first FRB detected inside the Milky Way, and the first to be linked to a known source. Later in 2020, SGR 1935+2154 was found to be associated with repeating fast radio bursts.

== History ==
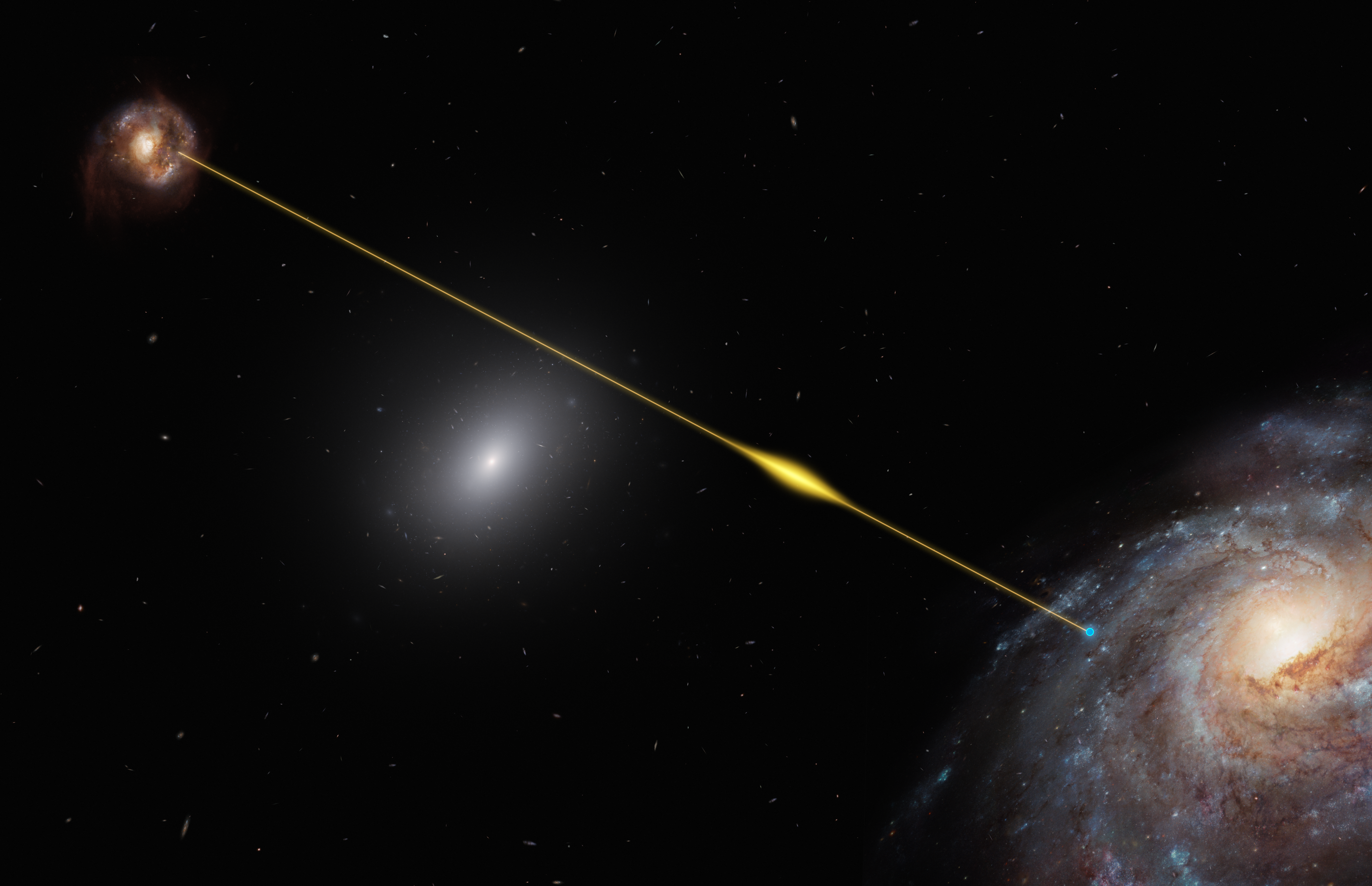
Example of a fast radio burst (FRB) from outer space to Earth (artist concept)

The Swift Burst Alert Telescope first alerted the astronomical community to an increase in activity from the remnant with the detection of a hard X-ray flare on 27 April 2020. The next day, the Canadian Hydrogen Intensity Mapping Experiment (CHIME) first reported the detection of two bright radio bursts from 400 MHz to 800 MHz in the direction of the remnant, establishing the link between radio emission and the remnant. They estimated that the bursts had an energy similar to the brightest giant pulses from the Crab Pulsar, which had never been seen from a magnetar. An independent detection of the bursts at 1.4 GHz by the STARE2 team established that the burst, now named FRB 200428, is similar to the fast radio bursts (FRBs) at extragalactic distances with their report that the spectral fluence of the burst must be >1.5 MJy⋅ms, more than a thousand times that reported by CHIME. At the distance of the closest known fast radio burst, FRB 200428 would have been detected with a spectral fluence of >7 mJy⋅ms. The INTEGRAL, Konus-Wind, Insight-HXMT, and AGILE telescopes then reported the detection of an X-ray burst from SGR 1935+2154 that occurred at the same time as the CHIME and STARE2 bursts, marking the first time an FRB had been associated with an X-ray source.

There was no associated optical counterpart observed in coincidence with the FRB, which greatly constrained the FRB emission model for the first time. To further secure the association of FRB 200428 with the remnant, the Five-hundred-meter Aperture Spherical Telescope (FAST) reported the detection of a much weaker radio burst, which was localized to within a maximal margin of error of a few arcminutes of the position of the remnant with a dispersion measure consistent with those reported by STARE2 and CHIME.

The NuSTAR, Swift, and NICER satellites observed several short X-ray bursts from the remnant on 29 April 2020 and 30 April 2020, confirming the magnetar was still in an active phase. The Very Large Array (VLA) followed the remnant 1–2 days after FRB 200428 and did not find any pulsed radio emission or an afterglow. The Deep Space Network (DSN) observed the remnant 1.5 to 3.5 days after the FRB and did not find evidence of periodic emission. LOFAR searched for other pulses from the remnant 1.5 days after FRB 200428 at 145 MHz and did not find any. Arecibo did not detect any bursts during a period of activity from the remnant in October 2019. Spektr-RG observed the remnant four days prior to FRB 200428 and found no evidence of flaring activity. Follow-up studies and observations have been reported. On 4 June 2020, astronomers reported "periodic radio pulsations" from the remnant with the Medicina Northern Cross (MNC) radio observatory on 30 May 2020. Another study was reported on 6 June 2020 of observations made earlier with the European VLBI Network on 13 May 2020. There have been other reported observations as well.

== Planetary system ==
The repeated X-ray bursts are easily explained by collisions of fragments caused by the partial tidal disruption of a planet orbiting the star. These fragments escape from the planet's surface and fall on SGR 1935+2154, creating the X-ray bursts. This planet should be composed of iron, having a mass of 18.1 M_{🜨} and radius of 1.6 R_{🜨}. It has an orbital period of about 238 days, a semi-major axis of 0.85 astronomical units and a very high orbital eccentricity of 0.992. The X-ray bursts occur when this planet is at periastron, its closest distance to the neutron star.

== See also ==
- SGR J1745−2900 – Magnetar located near the black hole Sagittarius A*: magnetar orbiting the SMBH Sagittarius A*
- SGR 1806−20: another neutron star with an inferred planet by the X-ray bursts
