= Peryton =

Fictional hybrid animal

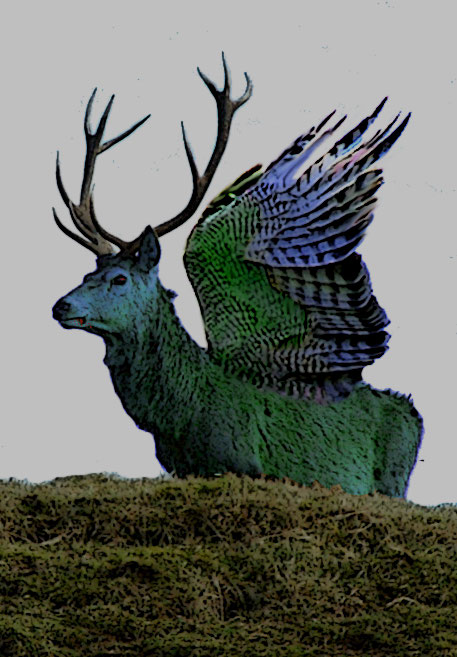
- An artist's impression of a peryton

Creature information
- Other name: Winged stag
- Grouping: Fantasy creatures
- Sub grouping: Hybrid
- Similar entities: Furfur, Hippogriff, Pegasus
- Folklore: Fakelore

Origin
- First attested: 1957
- Country: Atlantis (fictional origin)
- Region: Fictional
- Habitat: Fictional lands, Atlantis, Fantasy realms
- Details: A fictional hybrid combining the features of a stag and a large bird. Said to cast a human shadow until it kills a person, whereupon it begins casting its own shadow.

The peryton is a fictional hybrid animal combining the physical features of a stag and a bird. The peryton was invented by Jorge Luis Borges in his 1957 Book of Imaginary Beings, using the fictional device of a supposedly long-lost medieval manuscript.

== Precursors ==
Some historical versions of the heraldry of King Charles VI of France featured winged stags as heraldic supports, as did some versions of the late medieval battle standard of the Dukes of Bourbon.

== Characteristics ==
The peryton is said to have the head, neck, forelegs and antlers of a stag, combined with the plumage, wings and hindquarters of a large bird, although some interpretations portray the peryton as a deer in all but coloration and bird's wings.

According to Borges, perytons lived in Atlantis until an earthquake destroyed the civilization and the creatures escaped by flight. A peryton casts the shadow of a human until it kills one during its lifetime, at which time it starts to cast its own shadow. Some descriptions of the peryton allege that a sibyl once prophesied that the perytons would lead to the downfall of Rome.

== In science ==
Radio astronomer Sarah Burke-Spolaor gave the name Peryton to a class of radio signals of terrestrial origin that mimic fast radio bursts – pulses that appear to originate outside our galaxy. The signals Burke-Spolaor observed demonstrated some properties that appeared man-made and some that appeared natural. These perytons were found to be the result of premature opening of a microwave oven door, which released a frequency-swept radio pulse, which mimicked a fast radio burst, as the magnetron turned off.

== In popular culture ==
A version of the peryton appears in the tabletop game Dungeons & Dragons and its derivative novel Darkwell, a book in The Moonshae Trilogy where a flock of perytons are among an army of evil monsters summoned by the book's main antagonist.

A variation on the peryton menaces the protagonists of So You Want to Be a Wizard, a 1985 Diane Duane novel. She credits Borges in a 2021 essay.

The peryton features in John and Carole Barrowman's novel Hollow Earth.

Perytons appear in Across the Green Grass Fields, the 6th of the Wayward Children series by Seanan McGuire.

A group of perytons appear in the fourth Fablehaven book by Brandon Mull, Fablehaven: Secrets of the Dragon Sanctuary.

== See also ==
- Hybrid (mythology) – Mythological creature combining body parts of more than one real species
- Furfur – Goetic demon
