= Anne Archibald =

Canadian astronomer

Anne Murray Archibald is a Canadian astronomer known for her observations of pulsars and as one of the developers of SciPy, a scientific programming library for the Python programming language.

== Education and career ==
Archibald did her undergraduate studies in mathematics at the University of Waterloo, including internships involving computer graphics and the image analysis of radar data. After doing a master's degree in pure mathematics at McGill University, she became a doctoral student of astrophysicist Victoria Kaspi at McGill, and won both the Cecilia Payne-Gaposchkin Doctoral Dissertation Award in Astrophysics of the American Physical Society and the J.S. Plaskett Medal of the Canadian Astronomical Society for her 2013 doctoral dissertation, The End of Accretion: The X-ray Binary/Millisecond Pulsar Transition Object PSR J1023+0038.

After postdoctoral research at ASTRON and then at the Anton Pannekoek Institute for Astronomy, both in the Netherlands and supported by a Veni fellowship of the Netherlands Organisation for Scientific Research, she was a senior lecturer at Newcastle University from 2019 to 2023.
