= Bleien Radio Observatory =

Bleien Radio Telescope
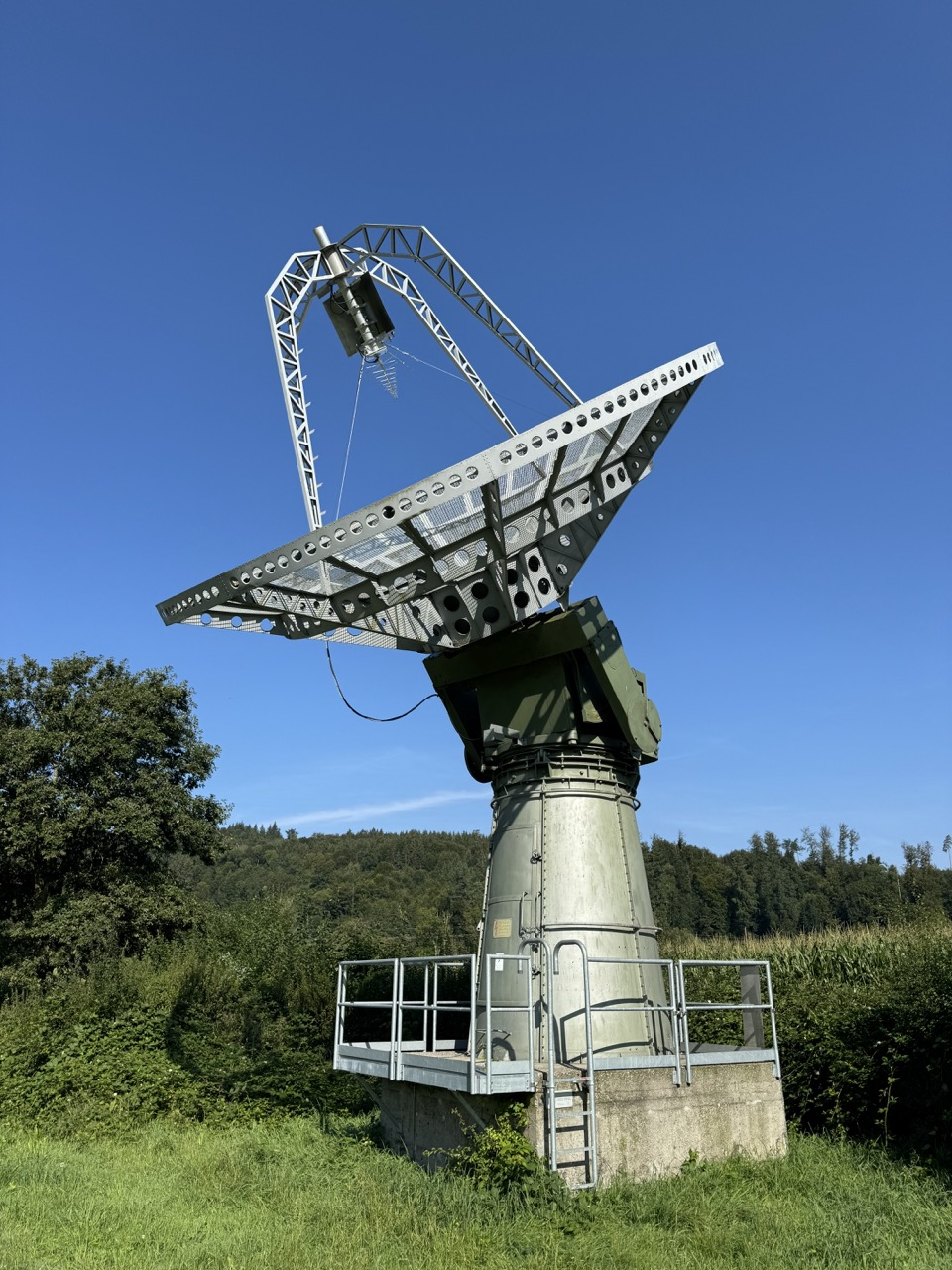
- The 7m telescope in 2025.
- Organization: ETH Zurich
- Location: Gränichen, Aarau District, Aargau, Switzerland
- Coordinates: 47°20′N 8°07′E
- Altitude: 469 m (1,539 ft)
- Website: cosmology.ethz.ch/research/instrumentation/bleien-radio-observatory.html
- Telescopes: Bleien 5m radio telescope; Bleien 7m radio telescope
- Location of Bleien Radio Telescope
- Related media on Commons

Bleien Radio Observatory is a radio astronomy observatory located halfway between Zürich and Bern in Switzerland. Its focus is on large bandwidth radio spectroscopy. The observatory is near the village of Bleien, 5 km south of Gränichen in the Canton of Aargau. The place is in a shallow valley that is relatively well protected against terrestrial interference.

== History ==
The observatory was built in 1979 by the Institute for Astronomy at ETH Zurich under the guidance of Prof. Dr. Arnold O. Benz. Since that time, it has consisted of two parabolic antennae of 7 m and 5 m diameter separated by 100 m, along with a lab building containing the spectrometers and other electronics. For the first time, a fully digitized and remotely controlled receiver was used. Frequency-agile spectrometers were applied initially. Today, digital filter banks and FFT (Fast Fourier transform) spectrometers are in operation. The initial frequency range of 100–1000 MHz was enlarged to 10 MHz – 5 GHz, which remains the largest for solar radio observations since 2005.

Starting in 2014, the observatory was modified by the ETH Zurich Cosmology Group to focus on extragalactic and cosmology research, as well as instrument development and testing. In 2021, Bleien was additionally upgraded with an ICEBoard system for prototyping for the (Hydrogen Intensity and Real-time Analysis eXperiment), notably operating as a two-element interferometer for the first time. It is currently configured to observe in the 400–800 MHz frequency range, consistent with HIRAX. The telescopes’ feeds were upgraded to modern log-periodic antennas in 2023, improving gain and eliminating polarisation squint. The supporting infrastructure, mechanical drives, and lab building were significantly upgraded in 2024 and 2025. Since 2026, Bleien has been in operation for student projects and continued prototyping of radio astronomy hardware and analysis.

== Science ==
The primary goal was the observation of radio emissions of solar flares. The most significant contribution was the survey and classification at decimeter wavelength (ultra high frequency). The data are crucial for investigating the acceleration of energetic electrons in solar flares. The broad bandwidth was also used to study non-solar radio emissions of gamma-ray bursts and to search for fast radio bursts, transients of possibly extragalactic origin.

The solar data since 1979, and the instrument descriptions are stored at the Institute of 4D Technologies at Fachhochschule Nordwestschweiz FHNW in Windisch and are public. The Bleien Radio Observatory was the starting point of the international e-CALLISTO network that surveys solar activity and space weather 24 hours per day in radio waves.

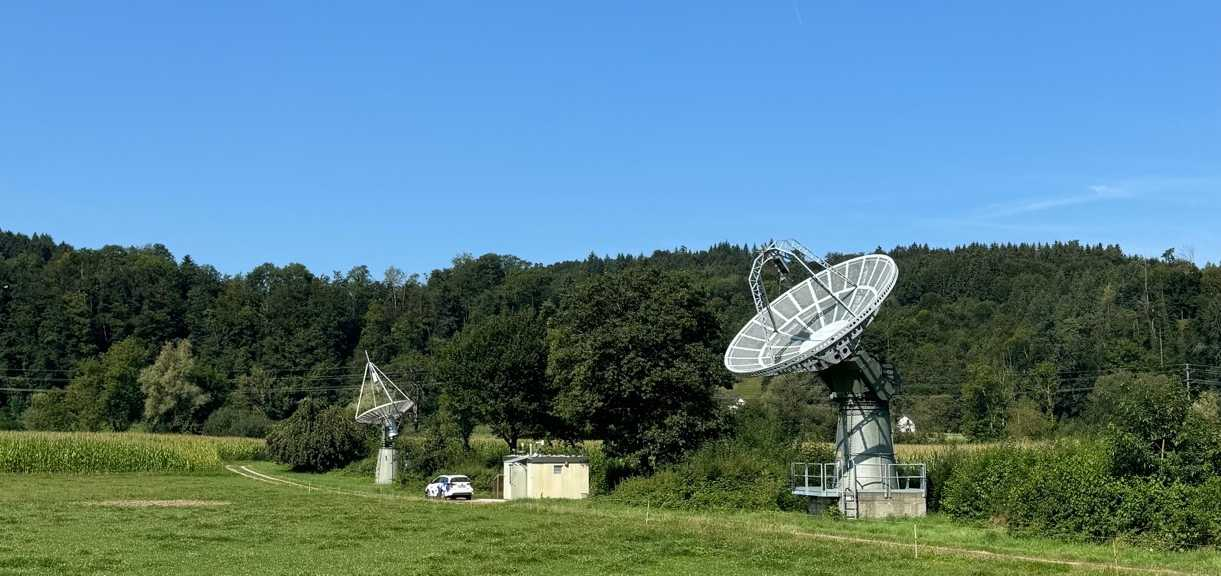
Overview of the Bleien Radio Observatory in 2025
