= Peryton (astronomy) =

Short man-made radio signals

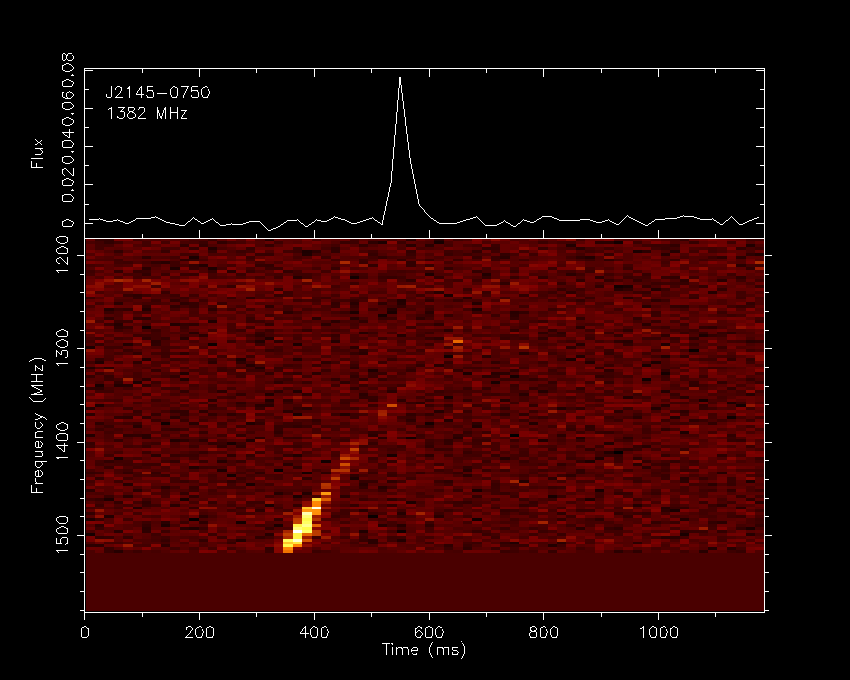
A peryton event detected at the Parkes Observatory.

In radio astronomy, perytons are short man-made radio signals of a few milliseconds resembling fast radio bursts (FRB). A peryton differs from radio frequency interference by the fact that it is a pulse of several to tens of millisecond duration which sweeps down in frequency. They are further verified by the fact that they occur at the same time in many beams, indicating that they come from Earth, whereas FRBs occur in only one or two of the beams, indicating that they are of galactic origin. The first signal occurred in 2001 but was not discovered until 2007. First detected at the Parkes Observatory, data gathered by the telescope also suggested the source was local. The signals were found to be caused by the premature opening of a microwave oven door nearby.

== Naming ==
Due to the unclear origin of the detections at first, the radio signals were named after the peryton, a fictional winged stag that casts the shadow of a man. This interprets into "strangeness made by man". This name was chosen for these signals because they are man-made but have characteristics that mimic the natural phenomenon of FRBs. The name was coined by Sarah Burke-Spolaor et al. in 2011.

== Detection ==
Perytons were observed at the Parkes Observatory and Bleien Radio Observatory. After the discovery of the first FRB in 2007, Dr. Burke-Spolaor searched through old telescope data looking for similar signals. She found what she was looking for, with a small difference. The 16 signals that she found seemed to fill the entire patch of the sky visible to the telescope. The lack of directionality in the new signals led Burke-Spolaor to the considerations that the signals were man-made and of earth. Between 1998 and 2015, old data showed 46 perytons that were identified at the Parkes Observatory. On June 23, 1998, 16 perytons were detected at that same location within seven minutes. In January 2015, three perytons were detected at the Parkes Observatory. As of 2015, 25 perytons had been the subject of scientific publications.

== Origin hypotheses ==
These signals mimicked some aspects of FRBs that appeared to be coming from outside the Milky Way Galaxy, but the possibility of their having an astronomical origin was soon excluded. To track activities near the telescope, the Commonwealth Scientific and Industrial Research Organization (CSIRO) installed a radio frequency interference (RFI) monitor at the Parkes site in December 2014. This form of monitoring became more common as radio-emitting devices became more prevalent on radio telescope sites, including mobile phones, Wi-Fi, and digital televisions. Important information was disclosed by the RFI monitor data, which had not been accessible for earlier peryton discoveries. Each peryton event was accompanied by a period of radio emission at a frequency of 2.5 GHz that was outside the telescope's field of view. These spikes were probably related to the perytons. Hypothesized potential sources of perytons included:

- Flashes in the ionosphere
- Lightning
- Narrow bipolar pulse (electrical discharges between clouds at high altitude with a capacity of several hundred gigawatts)
- Signals from aircraft
- Solar flares
- Terrestrial gamma-ray flashes

== Identification of origin ==
In 2015, perytons were found to be the result of premature opening of microwave oven doors at the Parkes Observatory. On March 17, 2015, three perytons were produced by experimentation by microwaving ceramic mugs filled with water and opening the door before the microwave had stopped operating. The microwave oven releases a frequency-swept radio pulse that mimics an FRB as the magnetron turns off. Two Matsushita microwave ovens were deemed responsible for most of the perytons. Both were functional and over 27 years old. Perytons were found to be produced about 50% of the times that the microwave door was opened before the timer expired.

== See also ==
- Wow! signal
