= Photon epoch =

Period in the evolution of the early universe

In physical cosmology, the photon epoch was the period in the evolution of the early universe in which photons dominated the energy of the universe. The photon epoch started after most leptons and anti-leptons were annihilated at the end of the lepton epoch, about 10 seconds after the Big Bang. Atomic nuclei were created in the process of nucleosynthesis, which occurred during the first few minutes of the photon epoch. For the remainder of the photon epoch, the universe contained a hot dense plasma of nuclei, electrons and photons.

At the start of this period, many photons had sufficient energy to photodissociate deuterium, so those atomic nuclei that formed were quickly separated back into protons and neutrons. By the ten second mark, ever fewer high energy photons were available to photodissociate deuterium, and thus the abundance of these nuclei began to increase. Heavier atoms began to form through nuclear fusion processes: tritium, helium-3, and helium-4. Finally, trace amounts of lithium and beryllium began to appear. Once the thermal energy dropped below 0.03 MeV, nucleosynthesis effectively came to an end. Primordial abundances were now set, with the measured amounts in the modern epoch providing checks on the physical models of this period.

370,000 years after the Big Bang, the temperature of the universe fell to the point where nuclei could combine with electrons to create neutral atoms. As a result, photons no longer interacted frequently with matter, the universe became transparent and the cosmic microwave background radiation was created and then structure formation took place. This is referred to as the surface of last scattering, as it corresponds to a virtual outer surface of the spherical observable universe.

== See also ==
- Timeline of the early universe
- Big Bang nucleosynthesis
- Timeline of the Big Bang
