= Fast radio burst =

Astronomical high energy transient pulse

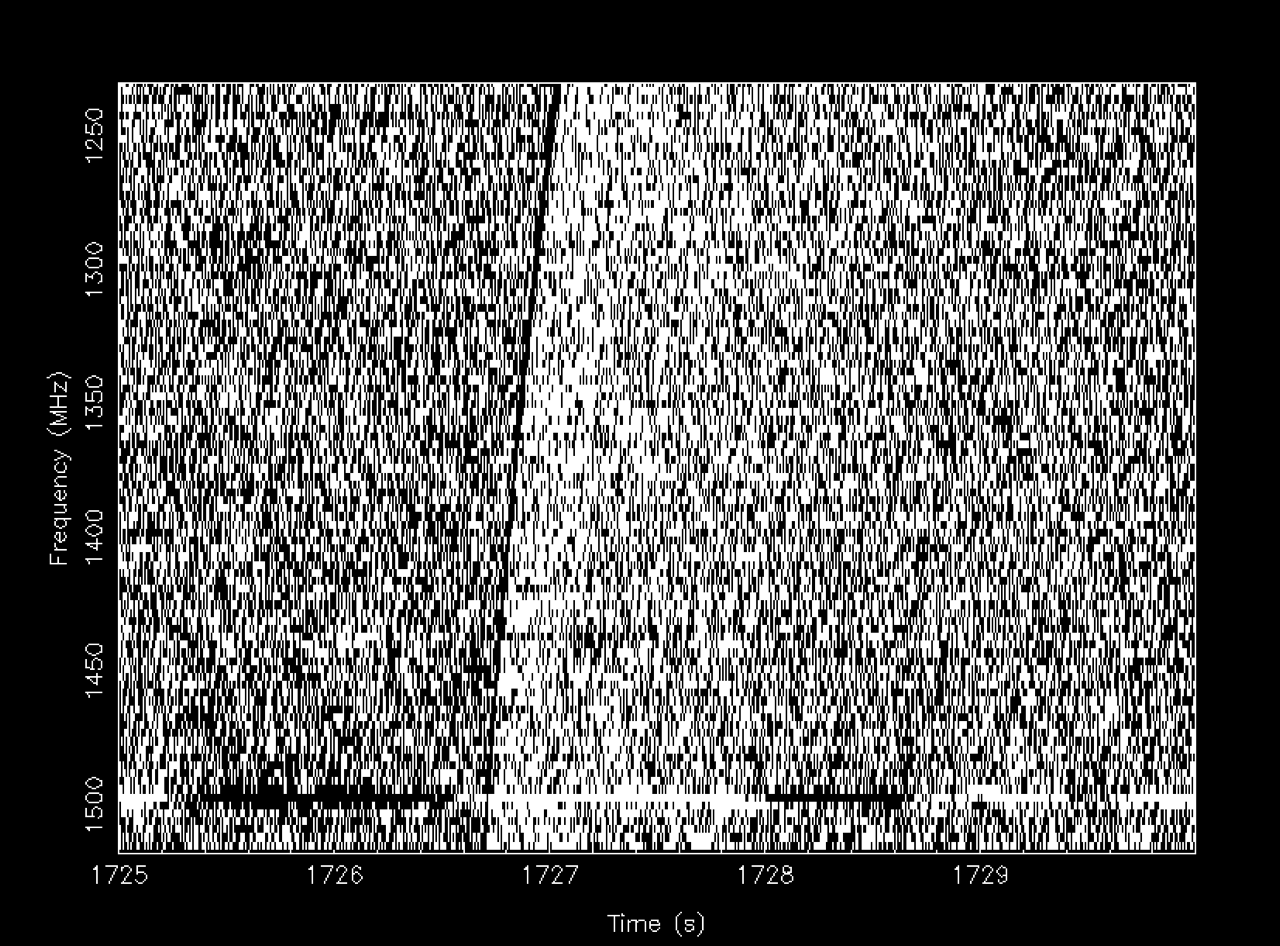
Lorimer Burst – Observation of the first detected fast radio burst as described by Lorimer in 2006.

In radio astronomy, a fast radio burst (FRB) is a transient radio wave caused by a high-energy astrophysical process that is not yet understood. The duration of an FRB is typically around a few milliseconds, although ultra-fast radio bursts may only last 15 microseconds or less. Astronomers estimate the average FRB releases as much energy in a millisecond as the Sun puts out in three days. While extremely energetic at their source, the strength of the signal reaching Earth has been described as 1,000 times less than from a mobile phone on the Moon.

The first FRB was discovered by Duncan Lorimer and his student David Narkevic in 2007 when they were looking through archival pulsar survey data, and it is therefore commonly referred to as the Lorimer burst. Many FRBs have since been recorded, including several that have been detected repeating in seemingly irregular ways. Only one FRB has been detected to repeat in a regular way: FRB 180916 seems to pulse every 16.35 days.

Most FRBs are extragalactic, but the first Milky Way FRB was detected by the CHIME radio telescope in April 2020. In June 2021, astronomers reported over 500 FRBs detected in one year.

When FRBs are polarized, it indicates that they are emitted from a source contained within an extremely powerful magnetic field. The exact origin and cause of FRBs is still the subject of investigation; proposals for their origin range from a rapidly rotating neutron star and a black hole, to extraterrestrial intelligence. In 2020, astronomers reported narrowing down a source of fast radio bursts, which may now plausibly include "compact-object mergers and magnetars arising from normal core collapse supernovae".

The discovery in 2012 of the first repeating source, FRB 121102, and its localization and characterization in 2017, has improved the understanding of the source class. FRB 121102 is identified with a galaxy at a distance of approximately three billion light-years and is embedded in an extreme environment. The first host galaxy identified for a non-repeating burst, FRB 180924, was identified in 2019 and is a much larger and more ordinary galaxy, nearly the size of the Milky Way. In August 2019, astronomers reported the detection of eight more repeating FRB signals. In January 2020, astronomers reported the precise location of a second repeating burst, FRB 180916. One FRB seems to have been in the same location as a known gamma-ray burst.

On 28 April 2020, a pair of millisecond-timescale bursts (FRB 200428) consistent with observed fast radio bursts, with a fluence of >1.5 million Jy ms, was detected from the same area of sky as the magnetar SGR 1935+2154. Although it was thousands of times less intrinsically bright than previously observed fast radio bursts, its comparative proximity (within our galaxy) rendered it the most powerful fast radio burst yet observed, reaching a peak flux of either a few thousand or several hundred thousand janskys, comparable to the brightness of the radio sources Cassiopeia A and Cygnus A at the same frequencies. This established magnetars as, at least, one ultimate source of fast radio bursts, although the exact cause remains unknown. Further studies support the notion that magnetars may be closely associated with FRBs. On 13 October 2021, astronomers reported the detection of hundreds of FRBs from a single system.

In 2024, an international team led by astrophysicists of INAF, using detections from VLA, NOEMA interferometer, and Gran Telescopio Canarias has conducted a research campaign about FRB20201124A, one of the two known persistent FRB, located about 1.3 billion light-years away. Based on the outcomes of the study, authors deem to confirm the origin of FRBs in a binary system at high accretion rate, that would blow a plasma bubble, responsible for the persistent radio emission. The emission object, i.e. the "bubble", would be immersed in a star-forming region.

== Detection ==
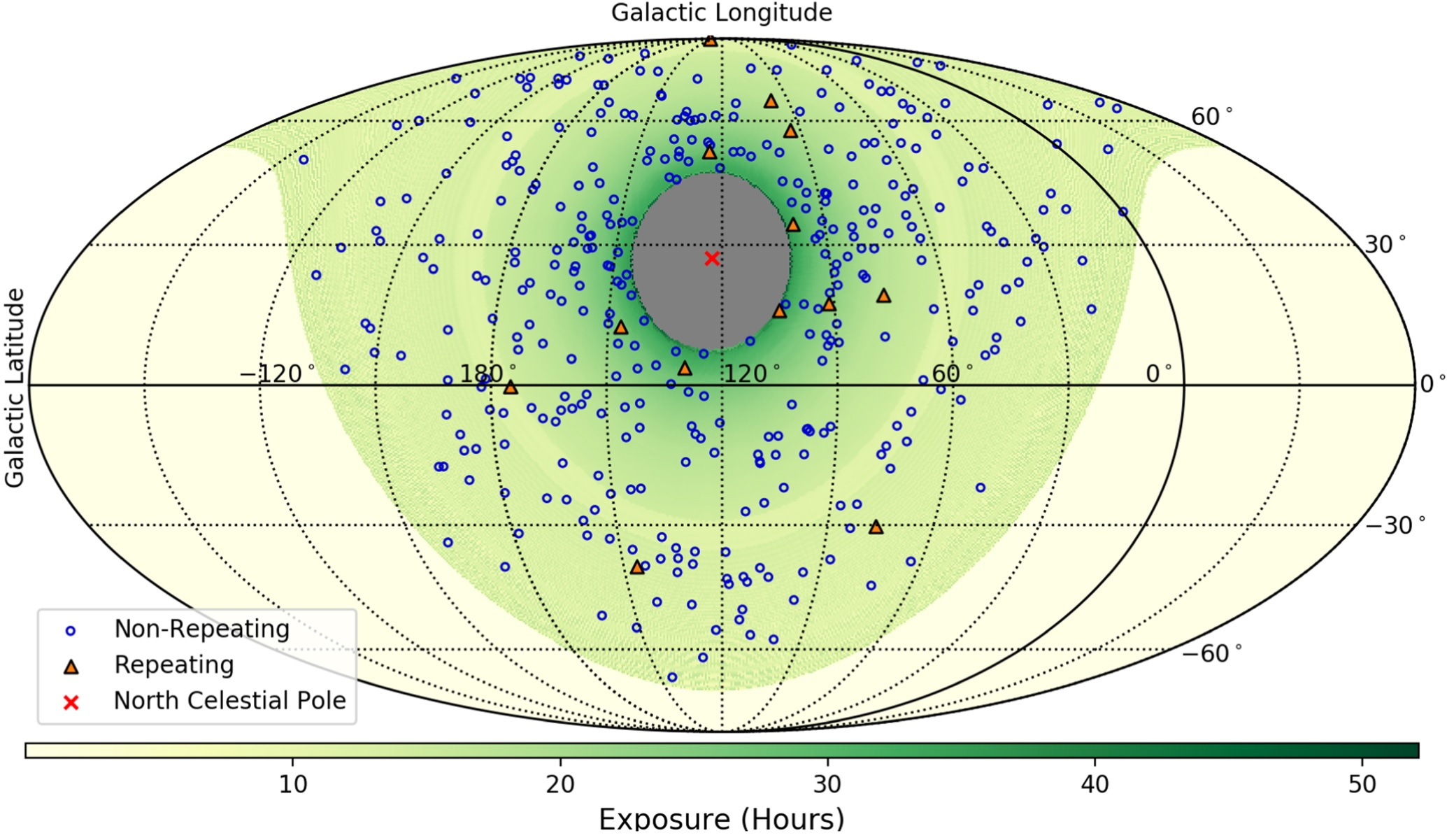
FRBs observed by CHIME in Galactic coordinates with locations of 474 nonrepeating and 18 repeating (62 bursts) sources from 28 August 2018 to 1 July 2019

The first fast radio burst to be described, the Lorimer Burst FRB 010724, was found in 2007 in archived data recorded by the Parkes Observatory on 24 July 2001. Since then, many FRBs have been found in previously recorded data. On 19 January 2015, astronomers at Australia's national science agency (CSIRO) reported that a fast radio burst had been observed for the first time live, by the Parkes Observatory. Many FRBs have been detected in real time by the CHIME radio telescope since it became operational in 2018, including the first FRB detected from within the Milky Way in April 2020.

In January 2025, astronomers discovered radio waves from a galaxy that is roughly 2-billion light years away from Earth and is believed to be more than 11 billion years old. These FRBs are associated with a galaxy that was believed to be dead.

== Features ==
Fast radio bursts are bright, unresolved (pointsource-like), broadband (spanning a large range of radio frequencies), millisecond flashes found in parts of the sky. Unlike many radio sources, the signal from a burst is detected in a short period of time with enough strength to stand out from the noise floor. The burst usually appears as a single spike of energy without any change in its strength over time. The bursts last for several milliseconds (thousandths of a second). The bursts come from all over the sky, and are not concentrated on the plane of the Milky Way. Known FRB locations are biased by the parts of the sky that the observatories can image.

Many have radio frequencies detected around 1400 MHz; a few have been detected at lower frequencies in the range of 400–800 MHz. The component frequencies of each burst are delayed by different amounts of time depending on the wavelength. This delay is described by a value referred to as a dispersion measure (DM). This results in a received signal that sweeps rapidly down in frequency, as longer wavelengths are delayed more, mainly due to free electrons in the interstellar medium.

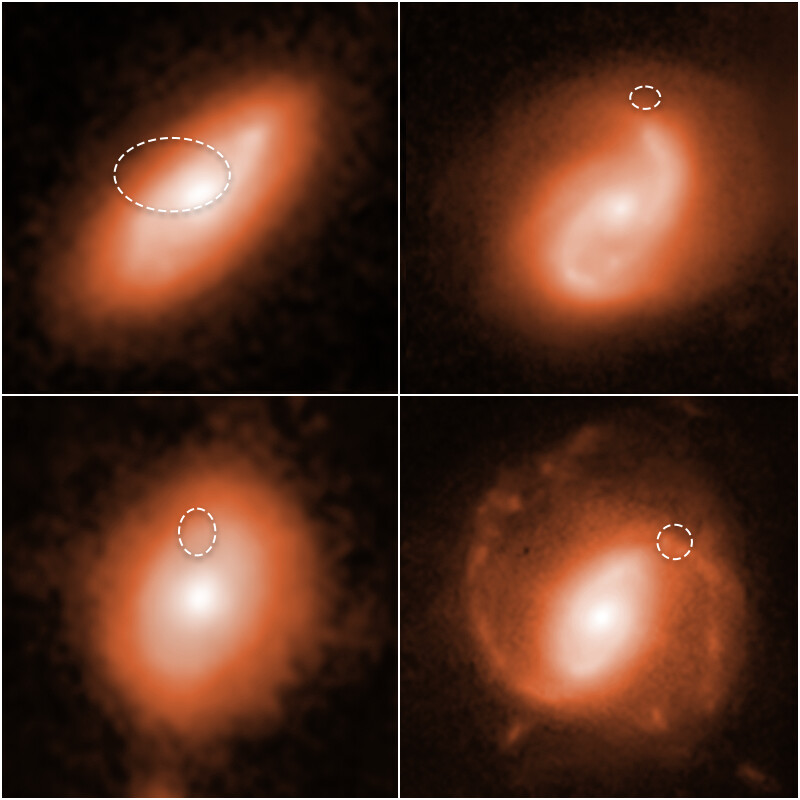
The bursts are catalogued as FRB 190714, at top left; FRB 191001, at top right; FRB 180924, at bottom left; and FRB 190608, at bottom right.

=== Extragalactic origin ===
The interferometer UTMOST has put a lower limit of 10,000 kilometers for the distance to the FRBs it has detected, supporting the case for an astronomical, rather than terrestrial, origin (because signal sources on Earth are ruled out as being closer than this limit). This limit can be determined from the fact that closer sources would have a curved wave front that could be detected by the multiple antennas of the interferometer.

Fast radio bursts have pulse dispersion measurements > 100 pc cm^{−3}, much larger than expected for a source inside the Milky Way galaxy and consistent with propagation through an ionized plasma. Furthermore, their distribution is isotropic (not especially coming from the galactic plane); consequently they are conjectured to be of extragalactic origin.

== Origin hypotheses ==
Because of the isolated nature of the observed phenomenon, the nature of the source remains speculative. As of 2022, there is no generally accepted single explanation, although a magnetar has been identified as a possible source. The sources are thought to be a few hundred kilometers or less in size, as the bursts last for only a few milliseconds. Causation is limited by the speed of light, about 300 km per millisecond, so if the sources were larger than about 1000 km, a complex synchronization mechanism would be required for the bursts to be so short. If the bursts come from cosmological distances, their sources must be very energetic. Extending the technique of measuring pulsar emission region sizes using a scattering screen in the Milky Way, a method to estimate the transverse FRB emission region size using a scattering screen in the host galaxy was formulated in 2024. Within the same year, a previously recorded burst, FRB 202210122A, was constrained to have an emission region size less than 30,000 km, using this technique.

One possible explanation would be a collision between very dense objects like merging black holes or neutron stars. It has been suggested that there is a connection to gamma-ray bursts. Some have speculated that these signals might be artificial in origin, that they may be signs of extraterrestrial intelligence, demonstrating veritable technosignatures. Analogously, when the first pulsar was discovered, it was thought that the fast, regular pulses could possibly originate from a distant civilization, and the source nicknamed "LGM-1" (for "little green men"). In 2007, just after the publication of the e-print with the first discovery, it was proposed that fast radio bursts could be related to hyperflares of magnetars. In 2015 three studies supported the magnetar hypothesis. The identification of first FRB from the Milky Way, which originated from the magnetar SGR 1935+2154, indicates that magnetars may be one source of FRB.

Especially energetic supernovae could be the source of these bursts. Blitzars were proposed in 2013 as an explanation. In 2014 it was suggested that following dark matter-induced collapse of pulsars, the resulting expulsion of the pulsar magnetospheres could be the source of fast radio bursts. In 2015 it was suggested that FRBs are caused by explosive decays of axion miniclusters. Another exotic possible source are cosmic strings that produced these bursts as they interacted with the plasma that permeated the early Universe. In 2016 the collapse of the magnetospheres of Kerr–Newman black holes were proposed to explain the origin of the FRBs' "afterglow" and the weak gamma-ray transient 0.4 s after GW 150914. It has also been proposed that if fast radio bursts originate in black hole explosions, FRBs would be the first detection of quantum gravity effects. In early 2017, it was proposed that the strong magnetic field near a supermassive black hole could destabilize the current sheets within a pulsar's magnetosphere, releasing trapped energy to power the FRBs.

=== Plasma processes ===
A variety of plasma-based mechanisms have been proposed to explain the coherent radio emission observed in FRBs. These processes typically involve relativistic magnetized plasmas, such as those found near magnetars or in shocks, where collective plasma effects and radiative processes can lead to the generation of bright, short-duration radio pulses. One promising mechanism is coherent electromagnetic emission from relativistic magnetized shocks, where the shock propagates in an electron–positron plasma with high magnetization (σ ≳ 1). These shocks generate X-mode polarized precursor waves through a synchrotron maser–like instability, with efficiencies and spectral features determined self-consistently via particle-in-cell simulations. The shocks can arise from magnetar flares driving relativistic outflows, and may convert a small fraction of their energy (~10^{−3} σ^{−1}) into coherent radio emission, consistent with observed FRB energetics. Another proposed mechanism is the electron cyclotron maser instability (ECMI), which can be triggered when synchrotron cooling generates ring-shaped momentum distributions that are unstable to X-mode wave growth. This has been demonstrated in simulations of strongly magnetized plasmas where radiative losses sustain the coherent radio emission.

Alternative models invoke coherent curvature radiation by bunched charges moving along curved magnetic field lines, often associated with magnetic reconnection near the surface or in the current sheet of neutron stars. In some versions, particle bunching is induced by plasma instabilities or perturbations in the magnetosphere. Other proposals include antenna-type mechanisms, where coherent structures in the plasma (such as charge-separated bunches or solitons) radiate collectively, and free electron laser (FEL)-like processes driven by reconnection-generated particle beams in magnetized turbulence. In these models, particles interact with Alfvénic or electromagnetic wigglers and emit coherently via nonlinear Thomson or Compton-like scattering. Collectively, these plasma-based mechanisms aim to explain the high brightness temperatures, narrow-band spectra, and polarization features of FRBs, and are often framed within the magnetar scenario, although they may operate in broader astrophysical settings.

=== Hypotheses for repeating FRBs ===
Repeated bursts of FRB 121102 have initiated multiple origin hypotheses. A coherent emission phenomenon known as superradiance, which involves large-scale entangled quantum mechanical states possibly arising in environments such as active galactic nuclei, has been proposed to explain these and other associated observations with FRBs (e.g. high event rate, repeatability, variable intensity profiles). In July 2019, astronomers reported that non-repeating Fast Radio Bursts may not be one-off events, but actually FRB repeaters with repeat events that have gone undetected and, further, that FRBs may be formed by events that have not yet been seen or considered. Additional possibilities include that FRBs may originate from nearby stellar flares.

== Bursts observed ==
=== Naming ===
Fast radio bursts are named by the date the signal was recorded, as "FRB YYMMDD", with a letter appended to distinguish multiple sources first recorded on the same date.

The name is of the presumed source rather than the burst of radio waves, so repeated or subsequent bursts from the same apparent location (eg, FRB 121102) do not get new date names.

=== 2007 (Lorimer Burst) ===
The first FRB detected, the Lorimer Burst FRB 010724, was discovered in 2007 when Duncan Lorimer of West Virginia University assigned his student David Narkevic to look through archival data taken in 2001 by the Parkes radio dish in Australia. Analysis of the survey data found a 30-jansky dispersed burst which occurred on 24 July 2001, less than 5 milliseconds in duration, located 3° from the Small Magellanic Cloud. The reported burst properties argue against a physical association with the Milky Way galaxy or the Small Magellanic Cloud. The discoverers argue that current models for the free electron content in the Universe imply that the burst is less than 1 gigaparsec distant. The fact that no further bursts were seen in 90 hours of additional observations implies that it was a singular event such as a supernova or merger of relativistic objects. It is suggested that hundreds of similar events could occur every day and if detected could serve as cosmological probes.

=== 2010 ===
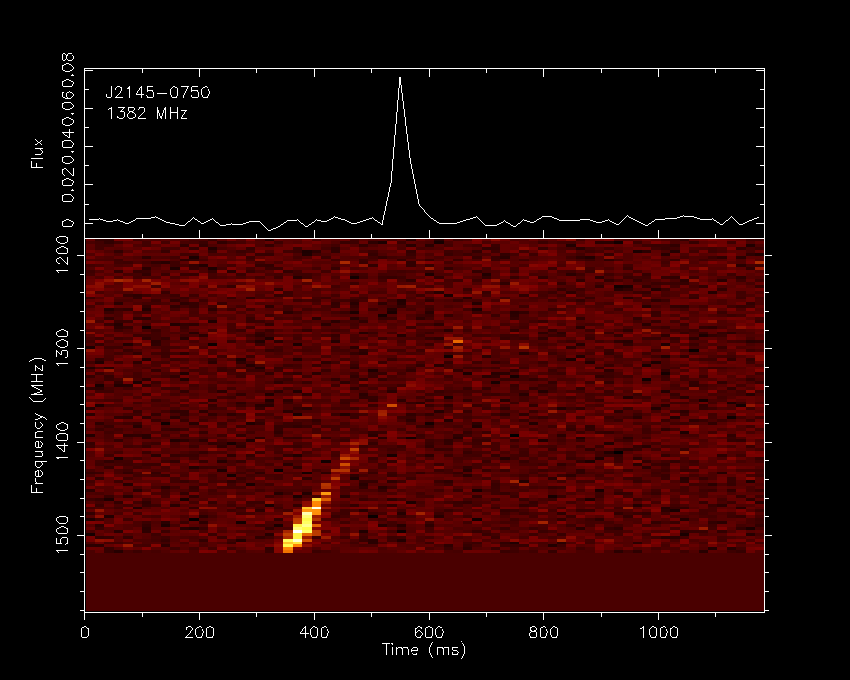
A peryton event detected at the Parkes Observatory. Peryton events are now known to be caused by the emission from a microwave oven.

In 2010 there was a report of 16 similar pulses, clearly of terrestrial origin, detected by the Parkes radio telescope and given the name perytons. In 2015 perytons were shown to be generated when microwave oven doors were opened during a heating cycle, with detected emission being generated by the microwave oven's magnetron tube as it was being powered off.

=== 2011 ===
In 2015, FRB 110523 was discovered in archival data collected in 2011 from the Green Bank Telescope. It was the first FRB for which linear polarization was detected (allowing a measurement of Faraday rotation). Measurement of the signal's dispersion delay suggested that this burst was of extragalactic origin, possibly up to 6 billion light-years away.

=== 2012 ===
Victoria Kaspi of McGill University estimated that as many as 10,000 fast radio bursts may occur per day over the entire sky.

==== FRB 121102 ====
An observation in 2012 of a fast radio burst (FRB 121102) in the direction of the constellation Auriga in the northern hemisphere using the Arecibo radio telescope confirmed the extragalactic origin of fast radio pulses by an effect known as plasma dispersion.

In November 2015, astronomer Paul Scholz at McGill University in Canada, found ten non-periodically repeated fast radio pulses in archival data gathered in May and June 2015 by the Arecibo radio telescope. The ten bursts have dispersion measures and sky positions consistent with the original burst FRB 121102, detected in 2012. Like the 2012 burst, the 10 bursts have a plasma dispersion measure that is three times larger than possible for a source in the Milky Way Galaxy. The team thinks that this finding rules out self-destructive, cataclysmic events that could occur only once, such as the collision between two neutron stars. According to the scientists, the data support an origin in a young rotating neutron star (pulsar), or in a highly magnetized neutron star (magnetar), or from highly magnetized pulsars travelling through asteroid belts, or from an intermittent Roche lobe overflow in a neutron star-white dwarf binary.

On 16 December 2016 six new FRBs were reported in the same direction (one having been received on 13 November 2015, four on 19 November 2015, and one on 8 December 2015). As of January 2019 this is one of only two instances in which these signals have been found twice in the same location in space. FRB 121102 is located at least 1150 AU from Earth, excluding the possibility of a human-made source, and is almost certainly extragalactic in nature.

As of April 2018, FRB 121102 is thought to be co-located in a dwarf galaxy about three billion light-years from Earth with a low-luminosity active galactic nucleus, or a previously unknown type of extragalactic source, or a young neutron star energising a supernova remnant.

On 26 August 2017, astronomers using data from the Green Bank Telescope detected 15 additional repeating FRBs coming from FRB 121102 at 5 to 8 GHz. The researchers also noted that FRB 121102 is presently in a "heightened activity state, and follow-on observations are encouraged, particularly at higher radio frequencies". The waves are highly polarized and undergo Faraday rotation, meaning "twisting" transverse waves, that could have formed only when passing through hot plasma with an extremely strong magnetic field. This rotation of polarized light is quantified by Rotation Measure (RM). FRB 121102's radio bursts have RM about 500 times higher than those from any other FRB to date. Since it is a repeating FRB source, it suggests that it does not come from some one-time cataclysmic event; so one hypothesis, first advanced in January 2018, proposes that these particular repeating bursts may come from a dense stellar core called a neutron star near an extremely powerful magnetic field, such as one near a massive black hole, or one embedded in a nebula.

In April 2018, it was reported that FRB 121102 emitted 21 bursts spanning one hour. In September 2018, an additional 72 bursts spanning five hours had been detected using a convolutional neural network. In September 2019, more repeating signals, 20 pulses on 3 September 2019, were reported to have been detected from FRB 121102 by the Five-hundred-meter Aperture Spherical Telescope (FAST). In June 2020, astronomers from Jodrell Bank Observatory reported that FRB 121102 exhibits repetitive radio-burst behavior ("radio bursts observed in a window lasting approximately 90 days followed by a silent period of 67 days") every 157 days, suggesting that the bursts may be associated with "the orbital motion of a massive star, a neutron star or a black hole". Subsequent studies by FAST of further activity, consisting of 12 bursts within two hours observed on 17 August 2020, supports an updated refined periodicity between active periods of 156.1 days. Related studies have been reported in October 2021. Further bursts, at least 300, were detected by FAST in August and September 2022. Further related studies were reported in April 2023. In July 2023 19 new bursts were reported from existing observations of 121102A that were taken by the Green Bank Telescope, eight of which were extremely short, independent bursts lasting between 5 and 15 microseconds, the shortest so far detected.

=== 2013 ===
In 2013, four bursts were identified that supported the likelihood of extragalactic sources.

=== 2014 ===
In 2014, FRB 140514 was caught 'live' and was found to be 21% (±7%) circularly polarised.

=== 2015 ===
==== FRB 150418 ====
On 18 April 2015, FRB 150418 was detected by the Parkes observatory and within hours, several telescopes including the Australia Telescope Compact Array caught an apparent radio "afterglow" of the flash, which took six days to fade. The Subaru Telescope was used to find what was thought to be the host galaxy and determine its redshift and the implied distance to the burst.

However, the association of the burst with the afterglow was soon disputed, and by April 2016 it was established that the "afterglow" originated from an active galactic nucleus (AGN) that is powered by a supermassive black hole with dual jets blasting outward from the black hole. It was also noted that what was thought to be an afterglow did not fade away as would be expected, supporting the interpretation that it originated in the variable AGN and was not associated with the fast radio burst.

=== 2017 ===
The upgraded Molonglo Observatory Synthesis Telescope (UTMOST), near Canberra (Australia), reported finding three more FRBs. A 180-day three-part survey in 2015 and 2016 found three FRBs at 843 MHz. Each FRB located with a narrow elliptical 'beam'; the relatively narrow band 828–858 MHz gives a less precise dispersion measure (DM).

A short survey using part of Australian Square Kilometre Array Pathfinder (ASKAP) found one FRB in 3.4 days. FRB170107 was bright with a fluence of 58±6 Jy ms.

According to Anastasia Fialkov and Abraham Loeb, FRB's could be occurring as often as once per second. Earlier research could not identify the occurrence of FRB's to this degree.

=== 2018 ===
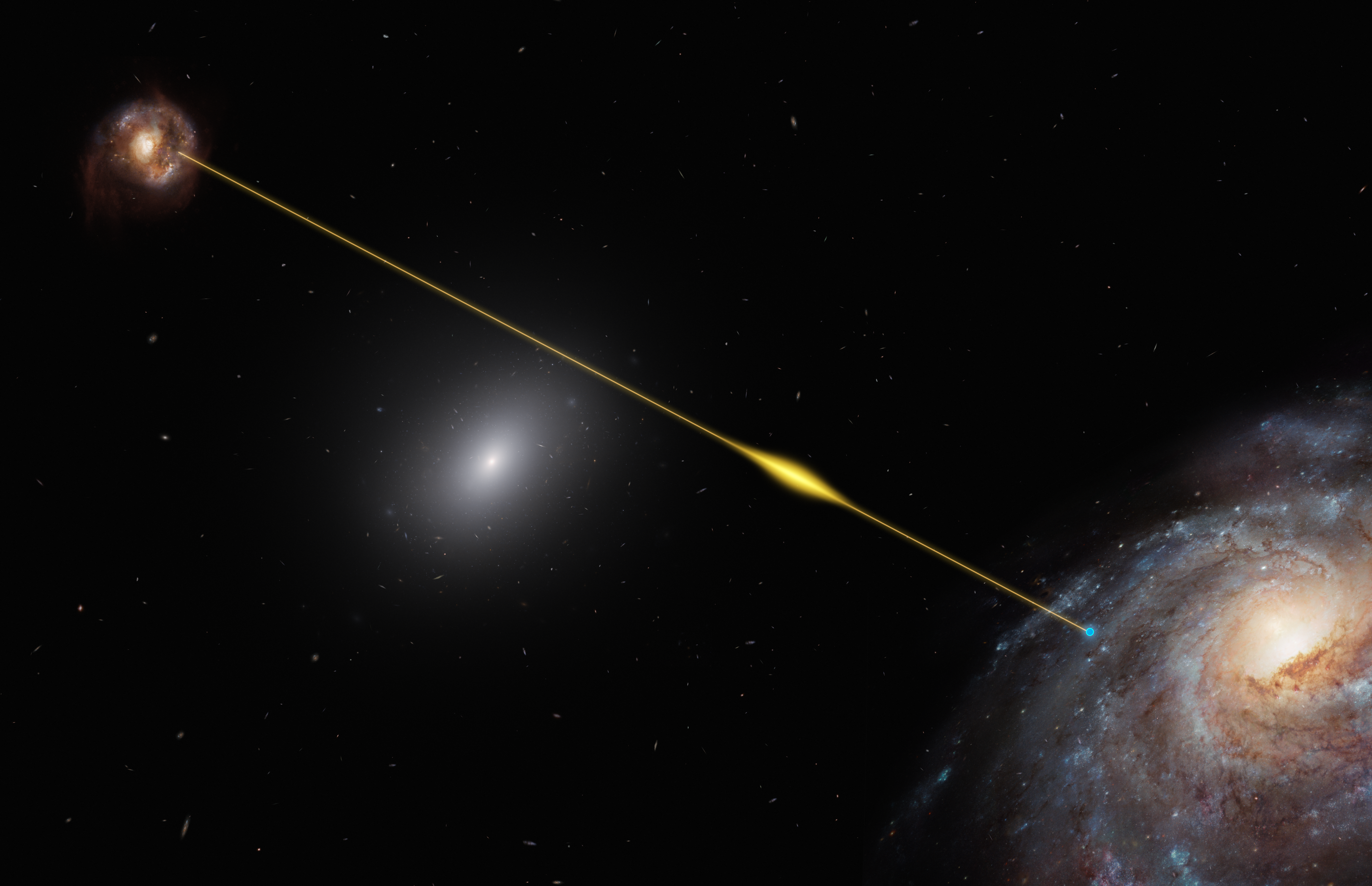
Artist's impression of a fast radio burst FRB 181112 traveling through space and reaching Earth.

Three FRBs were reported in March 2018 by Parkes Observatory in Australia. One (FRB 180309) had the highest signal-to-noise ratio yet seen of 411.

The unusual CHIME (Canadian Hydrogen Intensity Mapping Experiment) radio telescope, operational from September 2018, can be used to detect "hundreds" of fast radio bursts as a secondary objective to its cosmological observations. FRB 180725A was reported by CHIME as the first detection of a FRB under 700 MHz – as low as 580 MHz.

In October 2018, astronomers reported 19 more new non-repeating FRB bursts detected by the Australian Square Kilometre Array Pathfinder (ASKAP). These included three with dispersion measure (DM) smaller than seen before : FRB 171020 (DM=114.1), FRB 171213 (DM=158.6), FRB 180212 (DM=167.5).

==== FRB 180814 ====
On 9 January 2019, astronomers announced the discovery of a second repeating FRB source, named FRB 180814, by CHIME. Six bursts were detected between August and October 2018, "consistent with originating from a single position on the sky". The detection was made during CHIME's pre-commissioning phase, during which it operated intermittently, suggesting a "substantial population of repeating FRBs", and that the new telescope would make more detections.

Some news media reporting of the discovery speculated that the repeating FRB could be evidence of extraterrestrial intelligence, a possibility explored in relation to previous FRBs by some scientists, but not raised by the discoverers of FRB 180814.

==== FRB 180916 ====
FRB 180916, more formally FRB 180916.J0158+65, is a repeating FRB discovered by CHIME, that later studies found to have originated from a medium-sized spiral galaxy (SDSS J015800.28+654253.0) about 500 million light-years away – the closest FRB discovered to date. It is also the first FRB observed to have a regular periodicity. Bursts are clustered into a period of about four days, followed by a dormant period of about 12 days, for a total cycle length of 16.35±0.18 days. Additional followup studies of the repeating FRB by the Swift XRT and UVOT instruments were reported on 4 February 2020; by the Sardinia Radio Telescope (SRT) and Medicina Northern Cross Radio Telescope (MNC), on 17 February 2020; and, by the Galileo telescope in Asiago, also on 17 February 2020. Further observations were made by the Chandra X-ray Observatory on 3 and 18 December 2019, with no significant x-ray emissions detected at the FRB 180916 location, or from the host galaxy SDSS J015800.28+654253.0. On 6 April 2020, followup studies by the Global MASTER-Net were reported on The Astronomer's Telegram. On 25 August 2021, further observations were reported.

==== FRB 181112 ====
FRB 181112 was mysteriously unaffected after believed to have passed through the halo of an intervening galaxy.

=== 2019 ===
==== FRB 180924 ====
FRB 180924 is the first non-repeating FRB to be traced to its source. The source is a galaxy 3.6 billion light-years away. The galaxy is nearly as large as the Milky Way and about 1000 times larger than the source galaxy of FRB 121102. While the latter is an active site of star formation and a likely place for magnetars, the source of FRB 180924 is an older and less active galaxy.

Because the FRB was nonrepeating, the astronomers had to scan large areas with the 36 telescopes of ASKAP. Once a signal was found, they used the Very Large Telescope, the Gemini Observatory in Chile, and the W. M. Keck Observatory in Hawaii to identify its host galaxy and determine its distance. Knowledge of the distance and source galaxy properties enables a study of the composition of the intergalactic medium.

==== June 2019 ====
On 28 June 2019, Russian astronomers reported the discovery of nine FRB events (FRB 121029, FRB 131030, FRB 140212, FRB 141216, FRB 151125.1, FRB 151125.2, FRB 160206, FRB 161202, FRB 180321), which include FRB 151125, the third repeating one ever detected, from the direction of the M 31 (Andromeda Galaxy) and M 33 (Triangulum Galaxy) galaxies during the analysis of archive data (July 2012 to December 2018) produced by the BSA/LPI large phased array radio telescope at the Pushchino Radio Astronomy Observatory.

==== FRB 190520 ====
FRB 190520 was observed by the FAST telescope and was localized using the realfast system at the Karl G. Jansky Very Large Array (VLA). Optical observations using the Palomar 200-inch Hale Telescope revealed a host dwarf galaxy at redshift z=0.241. This is the second FRB observed to have an associated Persistent Radio Source (PRS). The dispersion measure(DM) and rotation measure measurements reveals a very dense, magnetized and turbulent environment local to the source. In June 2022, astronomers reported that FRB 20190520B was found to be another repeating FRB. On 12 May 2023, FRB 20190520B was reported to show multiple bursts indicating magnetic field reversal.

==== FRB 190523 ====
On 2 July 2019, astronomers reported that FRB 190523, a non-repeating FRB, has been discovered and, notably, localized to a few-arcsecond region containing a single massive galaxy at a redshift of 0.66, nearly 8 billion light-years away from Earth.

==== August 2019 ====
In August 2019, the CHIME Fast Radio Burst Collaboration reported the detection of eight more repeating FRB signals.

==== FRB 191223 ====
On 29 December 2019, Australian astronomers from the Molonglo Observatory Synthesis Telescope (MOST), using the UTMOST fast radio burst equipment, reported the detection of FRB 191223 in the constellation Octans (RA = 20:34:14.14, DEC = -75:08:54.19).

==== FRB 191228 ====
On 31 December 2019, Australian astronomers, using the Australian Square Kilometre Array Pathfinder (ASKAP), reported the detection of FRB 191228 in the constellation Piscis Austrinus (RA = 22:57(2), DEC = -29:46(40)).

=== 2020 ===
==== FRB 200120E ====
In February & March 2022, astronomers reported that a globular cluster of M81, a grand design spiral galaxy about 12 million light-years away, may be the source of FRB 20200120E, a repeating fast radio burst.

==== FRB 200317 ====
Astronomers reported the discovery of FRB 20200317A (RA 16h22m45s, DEC p+56d44m50s) with FAST (Five-hundred-meter Aperture Spherical radio Telescope) in archival data on 22 September 2023. The detected FRB is "one of the faintest FRB sources detected so far", according to the report.

==== FRB 200428 ====
On 28 April 2020, astronomers at the Canadian Hydrogen Intensity Mapping Experiment (CHIME), reported the detection of a bright radio burst from the direction of the Galactic magnetar SGR 1935+2154 about 30,000 light years away in the constellation Vulpecula. The burst had a DM of 332.8 pc/cc. The STARE2 team independently detected the burst and reported that the burst had a fluence of >1.5 MJy ms, establishing the connection between this burst and FRBs at extragalactic distances. The burst was then referred to as FRB 200428. The detection is notable, as the STARE2 team claim it is the first ever FRB detected inside the Milky Way, and the first ever to be linked to a known source. That link strongly supports the idea that fast radio bursts emanate from magnetars.

=== FRB 200610 ===
On 10 January 2024, astronomers reported that the source of FRB 20200610A was a "rare 'blob-like' group of galaxies".

==== FRBs 200914 and 200919 ====
On 24 September 2020, astronomers reported the detection of two new FRBs, FRB200914 and FRB200919, by the Parkes Radio Telescope. Upper limits on low-frequency emission from FRB 200914 were later reported by the Square Kilometre Array radio telescope project.

==== FRB 201124 ====
On 31 March 2021, the CHIME/FRB Collaboration reported the detection of FRB 20201124A and related multiple bursts within the week of 23 March 2021 — designated as 20210323A, 20210326A, 20210327A, 20210327B, 20210327C, and 20210328A — and later, likely 20210401A and 20210402A. Further related observations were reported by other astronomers on 6 April 2021, 7 April 2021, and many more as well, including an "extremely bright" pulse on 15 April 2021. Source localization improvements were reported on 3 May 2021. Even more observations were reported in May 2021, including "two bright bursts". On 3 June 2021, the SETI Institute announced detecting "a bright double-peaked radio burst" from FRB 201124A on 18 May 2021. Further observations were made by the Neil Gehrels Swift Observatory on 28 July 2021 and 7 August 7, 2021 without detecting a source on either date. On 23 September 2021, 9 new bursts from FRB 20201124A were reported to have been observed with the Effelsberg 100-m Radio Telescope, followed by one CHIME observation, all after four months of no detections. In January and February 2022, further observations of new bursts from FRB 20201124A with the Westerbork-RT1 25-m telescope were also reported. In mid-March 2022, further observations of FRB 20201124 were reported. In September 2022, astronomers suggested that the repeating FRB 20201124A may originate from a magnetar/Be star binary.

=== 2021 ===
==== FRB 210401 ====
On 2 and 3 April 2021, astronomers at the Australian Square Kilometre Array Pathfinder (ASKAP) reported the detection of FRB 20210401A and 20210402A which were understood likely to be repetitions of FRB 20201124A, a repeating FRB with recent very high burst activity, that was reported earlier by the CHIME/FRB collaboration.

==== FRB 210630 ====
On 30 June 2021, astronomers at the Molonglo Observatory Synthesis Telescope (UTMOST) detected FRB 210630A at the "likely" position of "RA = 17:23:07.4, DEC =+07:51:42, J2000".

==== FRB 211211 ====
On 15 December 2021, astronomers at the Neil Gehrels Swift Observatory reported further observations of the "bright CHIME FRB 20211122A (event #202020046 T0: 2021-12-11T16:58:05.183768)".

=== 2022 ===
==== FRB 220414 ====
On 14 April 2022, astronomers at Tianlai Cylinder Pathfinder Array (a radio interferometer located in Xinjiang, China, operated by the National Astronomical Observatory, Chinese Academy of Sciences (NAOC)) detected FRB 220414 (?) ("A bright burst was detected with a S/N~15 for ~2.2 ms duration at UT 17:26:40.368, April 14, 2022 (MJD 59684.06018945136)") located at "RA = 13h04m21s(\pm 2m12s), DEC = +48\deg18'05"(\pm 10'19")".

==== FRB 220610 ====
On 19 October 2023, astronomers reported that FRB 20220610A traveled for 8 billion years to reach Earth equivalent at a redshift of $z=1$ making it the oldest FRB known and also calculated to be the most energetic one with a spectral energy density of ~6.4×10^{32}erg/Hz and a maximum burst energy of ~2×10^{42}erg higher than the previous predicted maximum energy for FRBs. In January 2024, further detailed observations and studies were reported.

==== FRB 220912 ====
On 15 October 2022, astronomers at CHIME/FRB reported the detection of nine bursts in three days of FRB 20220912A. Since later bursts observed between 15 October 2022 and 29 October 2022 by the CHIME/FRB collaboration, astronomers, afterwards, at the Allen Telescope Array (ATA), on 1 November 2022, reported eight more bursts from FRB 20220912A. ATA coordinates were first set to the original settings (23h09m05.49s + 48d42m25.6s) and then later to the newly updated ones (23h09m04.9s +48d42m25.4s). On 13 November 2022, further burst activity of FRB 20220912A was reported by the Tianlai Dish Pathfinder Array in Xinjiang, China and, on 5 December 2022, from several other observatories. On 13 December 2022, over a hundred bursts from FRB 220912A were reported by the Upgraded Giant Metrewave Radio Telescope (uGMRT), operated by the National Centre for Radio Astrophysics of the Tata Institute of Fundamental Research in India. On 21 December 2022, several more bright bursts of FRB 220912A using the Westerbork-RT1 were reported. Four more bursts were reported on 13 July 2023 by the Medicina Radio Observatory (specifically by the Medicina Northern Cross (MNC) radio telescope) in Bologna, Italy. Based on four bursts, burst rate constraints of FRB 20220912A at various frequencies using the Green Bank 20-meter telescope were reported on 18 August 2023. Swift X-ray observations were reported on 1 September 2023.

==== FRB 191221 ====
On 13 July 2022, a journal article in Nature reported the discovery of FRB 20191221A, an FRB with an unusually long duration of three seconds. However, the team announced in July 2025 that this conclusion was due to a calibration error that had mispointed the beams by 20 degrees, with the periodic signal actually coming from the known Galactic pulsar PSR J0248+6021. Nature retracted this paper in June 2026.

==== FRB 221128 ====
On 1 December 2022, astronomers reported the discovery of FRB 20221128A, using the UTMOST-NS radio telescope located in New South Wales, Australia. According to the astronomers, "The most likely position [of FRB 20221128A] is RA = 07:30(10), DEC = -41:32(1), J2000 which corresponds to Galactic coordinates: Gl = 177.1 deg, Gb = 24.45 deg". Later, on 19 January 2023, a corrected position [of FRB 20221128A] was reported as follows: "The revised FRB position is RA = 07:30(10), DEC = -42:30(1) in equatorial (J2000) coordinates, which corresponds to Galactic coordinates: Gl = 255.1 deg, Gb = -11.4 deg (we additionally note that the Galactic coordinates in ATel #15783 were in error)".

==== FRB 221206 ====
On 6 December 2022, detection of a possible magnetar gamma-ray burst at or near the same time and location as a fast radio burst was reported.

=== 2023 ===
==== FRB 230814 ====
Discovery of FRB 20230814A by the Deep Synoptic Array DSA-110 was reported on 16 August 2023, and was determined to be localized (preliminarily) at 22h23m53.9s +73d01m33.3s (J2000).

==== FRB 230905 ====
Observations of FRB 20230905 in the X-ray and UV range by the Neil Gehrels Swift Observatory was reported as bright and non-repeating on 7 September 2023.

=== 2024 ===
==== FRB 240114 ====
Discovery of a new repeating FRB 20240114A by the CHIME/FRB Collaboration (at position RA (J2000): 321.9162 +- 0.0087 deg, Dec (J2000): 4.3501 +- 0.0124 degrees) was reported on 26 January 2024. The three bursts from the FRB were detected at "2024-01-14 21:50:39, 2024-01-21 21:30:40, and 2024-01-24 21:20:11 UTC", and associated with a galaxy cluster at 425 Mpc. The dispersion measure DM of the brightest burst was 527.7 pc cm^-3. On 5 February 2024, observations of five repeated bursts of FRB 20240114A on 2 February 2024 were reported using the Parkes/Murriyang Ultra Wideband Low (UWL) receiver system. Also on 5 February 2024, a FRB detection was reported by the Westerbork RT1 25-m telescope. On 8 February 2024, related observations of FRB 20240114A were reported by FAST (38 bursts from 28 January to 4 February) and the Northern Cross Radio Telescope (1 burst on 1 February). Detection and localization studies of FRB 20240114A by MeerKAT in South Africa were reported on 14 February 2024. On 15 February 2024, 10 bursts were reported to have been detected on 1 February 2024 by the Giant Metrewave Radio Telescope (GMRT) in India. On 29 February 2024, 51 bursts (including micro-structure) on 25 February 2024 using uGMRT were reported. On 5 March 2024, a "burst storm" was reported from FRB 20240114A by the FAST radio telescope. On 20 March 2024, the European VLBI Network (EVN) reported several detailed studies, which included observations on 15 February 2024 (7 bursts) and 20 February 2024 (13 bursts), of FRB 20240114A was observed on 17 March 2024240114A. On 21 March 2024, the Northern Cross Radio Telescope in Italy reported a bright radio burst of FRB 20240114A, at updated coordinates of R.A.: 21:27:39.84, Dec: +04:19:46.34 (J2000), on 17 March 2024. On 2 April 2024, astronomers report over 100 detections of FRB 20240114A using five small European radio telescopes. On 18 April 2024, a coincident gamma-ray emission was observed possibly associated with FRB 20240114A. On 23 April 2024, five repeat bursts from FRB 20240114A were reported to have been detected by the Nancay Radio Telescope at 2.5 GHz ("highest frequency to date") on 18 April 2024. On 25 April 2024, eight repeat bursts from FRB 20240114A were reported to have been detected by the Allen Telescope Array (ATA) at frequencies above 2.0 GHz. On 26 April 2024, no counterpart candidates (ie, "no significance gamma-ray emission") from FRB 20240114A were reported to have been observed by Fermi-LAT. On 4 May 2024, astronomers reported a redshift (ie, "a common redshift of z=0.1300+/-0002") for the FRB host galaxy, possibly a dwarf star-forming galaxy. Astronomers, on 15 May 2024, reported multiple burst detections of FRB 20240114A up to 6 GHz using the Effelsberg 100-m Radio Telescope. A gamma-ray flare associated with FRB 20240114A was reported on 25 May 2024.

==== FRB 240216 ====
Announcement of five bursts from FRB 20240216A, a new repeating fast radio burst source, detected by Australian SKA Pathfinder (ASKAP) at position (J2000) of RA: 10:12:19.9 DEC: +14:02:26, was reported on 22 February 2024. FAST, on February 24, 2024, reported no detection, with several explanations, of FRB 20240216A.

== List of notable bursts ==
All FRBs are cataloged at TNS.

Name	Date and time (UTC) for 1581.804688 MHz	RA (J2000)	Decl. (J2000)	DM (pc·cm^{−3})	Width (ms)	Peak flux (Jy)	Notes
FRB 010621	2001-06-21 13:02:10.795	18^{h} 52^{m}	−08° 29′	746	7.8	0.4	
FRB 010724	2001-07-24 19:50:01.63	01^{h} 18^{m}	−75° 12′	375	4.6	30	"Lorimer Burst"
FRB 011025	2001-10-25 00:29:13.23	19^{h} 07^{m}	−40° 37′	790	9.4	0.3	
FRB 090625	2009-06-25 21:53:52.85	03^{h} 07^{m}	−29° 55′	899.6	<1.9	>2.2	
FRB 110220	2011-02-20 01:55:48.957	22^{h} 34^{m}	−12° 24′	944.38	5.6	1.3	
FRB 110523	2011-05-23	21^{h} 45^{m}	−00° 12′	623.30	1.73	0.6	700–900 MHz at Green Bank radio telescope, detection of both circular and linear polarization.
FRB 110627	2011-06-27 21:33:17.474	21^{h} 03^{m}	−44° 44′	723.0	<1.4	0.4	
FRB 110703	2011-07-03 18:59:40.591	23^{h} 30^{m}	−02° 52′	1103.6	<4.3	0.5	
FRB 120127	2012-01-27 08:11:21.723	23^{h} 15^{m}	−18° 25′	553.3	<1.1	0.5	
FRB 121002	2012-10-02 13:09:18.402	18^{h} 14^{m}	−85° 11′	1628.76	2.1; 3.7	0.35	double pulse 5.1 ms apart
FRB 121002	2012-10-02 13:09:18.50	18^{h} 14^{m}	−85° 11′	1629.18	<0.3	>2.3	
FRB 121102	2012-11-02 06:35:53.244	05^{h} 32^{m}	+33° 05′	557	3.0	0.4	by Arecibo radio telescope Repeating bursts, very polarized.
FRB 130626	2013-06-26 14:56:00.06	16^{h} 27^{m}	−07° 27′	952.4	<0.12	>1.5	
FRB 130628	2013-06-28 03:58:00.02	09^{h} 03^{m}	+03° 26′	469.88	<0.05	>1.2	
FRB 130729	2013-07-29 09:01:52.64	13^{h} 41^{m}	−05° 59′	861	<4	>3.5	
FRB 131104	2013-11-04 18:04:01.2	06^{h} 44^{m}	−51° 17′	779.0	<0.64	1.12	'near' Carina Dwarf Spheroidal Galaxy
FRB 140514	2014-05-14 17:14:11.06	22^{h} 34^{m}	−12° 18′	562.7	2.8	0.47	21 ±7 per cent (3σ) circular polarization
FRB 150215	2015-02-15 20:41:41.714	18^{h} 17^{m} 27^{s}	−04° 54′ 15″	1105.6	2.8	0.7	43% linear, 3% circular polarized. Low galactic latitude. Low/zero rotation measure. Detected in real time. Not detected in follow up observations of gamma rays, X-rays, neutrinos, IR etc.
FRB 150418	2015-04-18 04:29	07^{h} 16^{m}	−19° 00′	776.2	0.8	2.4	Detection of linear polarization. The origin of the burst is disputed.
unnamed	2015-05-17; 2015-06-02	05^{h} 31^{m} 58^{s} (average)	+33° 08′ 04″ (average)	559 (average)	0.02–0.31	2.8–8.7	10 repeat bursts at FRB 121102 location: 2 bursts on May 17 and 8 bursts on June 2 and 1 on 13 Nov 2015, 4 on 19 Nov 2015, and 1 on 8 Dec 2015
FRB 150610	2015-06-10 05:26:59.396	10:44:26	−40:05:23	1593.9(±0.6)	2(±1)	0.7(±0.2)	
FRB 150807	2015-08-07 17:53:55.7799	22:40:23	– 55:16	266.5	0.35±0.05	120±30	80% linearly polarised, Galactic latitude −54.4°, Decl ±4 arcmin, RA ±1.5 arcmin, highest peak flux
FRB 151206	2015-12-06 06:17:52.778	19:21:25	−04:07:54	1909.8(±0.6)	3.0(±0.6)	0.3(±0.04)	Large DM
FRB 151230	2015-12-30 16:15:46.525	09:40:50	−03:27:05	960.4(±0.5)	4.4(±0.5)	0.42(±0.03)	
FRB 160102	2016-01-02 08:28:39.374	22:38:49	−30:10:50	2596.1(±0.3)	3.4(±0.8)	0.5(±0.1)	A new record large DM
FRB 160317	2016-03-17 09:00:36.530	07:53:47	−29:36:31	1165(±11)	21	>3.0	UTMOST, Decl ± 1.5°
FRB 160410	2016-04-10 08:33:39.680	08:41:25	+06:05:05	278(±3)	4	>7.0	UTMOST, Decl ± 1.5°
FRB 160608	2016-06-08 03:53:01.088	07:36:42	−40:47:52	682(±7)	9	>4.3	UTMOST, Decl ± 1.5°
FRB 170107	2017-01-07 20:05:45.1397	11:23	– 05:01	609.5(±0.5)	2.6	27±4	first by ASKAP, high fluence ~58 Jy ms. In Leo. Galactic latitude 51°, Distance 3.1 Gpc, isotropic energy ~3 × 10^{34} J
unnamed	2017-08-26 13:51:44	05^{h} 32^{m}	+33° 08′	558(approx)	?	?	15 more bursts at the location of FRB 121102 detected by Green Bank Telescope over a 24-minute interval, bringing the total received bursts from this location to 34.
FRB 170827	2017-08-27 16:20:18	00^{h} 49^{m} 18.66^{s}	−65° 33′ 02.3″	176.4	0.395		low DM
FRB 170922	2017-09-22z 11:23:33.4	21^{h} 29^{m} 50.61^{s}	−07° 59′ 40.49″	1111	26		extreme scattering (long pulse)
FRB 171020	2017-10-20 10:27:58.598	22:15	– 19:40	114.1±0.2	3.2		ASKAP s/n=19.5 G-Long'=29.3 G-lat'=-51.3 Lowest DM so far.
FRB 171209	2017-12-09 20:34:23.5	15^{h} 50^{m} 25^{s}	−46° 10′ 20″	1458	2.5	2.3	Seems to be in the same location as GRB 110715A
FRB 180301	2018-03-01 07:34:19.76	06^{h} 12^{m} 43.4^{s}	+04° 33′ 44.8″	520	3	0.5	positive spectrum, from Breakthrough Listen
FRB 180309	2018-03-09 02:49:32.99	21^{h} 24^{m} 43.8^{s}	−33° 58′ 44.5″	263.47	0.576	12	
FRB 180311	2018-03-11 04:11:54.80	21^{h} 31^{m} 33.42^{s}	−57° 44′ 26.7″	1575.6	12	2.4	
FRB 180725A	2018-07-25 17:59:43.115	06^{h} 13^{m} 54.7^{s}	+67° 04′ 00.1″	716.6	2		first detection of an FRB at radio frequencies below 700 MHz; Realtime detection by CHIME.
FRB 180814.2	2018-08-14 14:49:48.022	04^{h} 22^{m} 22^{s}	+73° 40′	189.38±0.09	2.6±0.2	8.1	Detected by CHIME. Second repeating FRB to be discovered and first since 2012.
FRB 180916	2018-09-16 10:15:19.803	01^{h} 58^{m} 00.75^{s}	+65° 43′ 00.5″	349.2±0.4	1.4±0.07	1.4±0.6	repeating FRB localized to a nearby (450 million lyr) spiral galaxy. 16.35 day periodicity.
FRB 180924	2018-09-24 16:23:12.6265	21^{h} 44^{m} 25.26^{s}	−40° 54′ 0.1″	361.42	1.3	16	First non-repeating FRB whose source has been localized; a galaxy 3.6 billion light-years away
FRB 190523	Date/Time	13^{h} 48^{m} 15.6^{s}	+72° 28′ 11″	760.8(6)	0.42±0.05	Peak flux	A non-repeating FRB – localised to a galaxy at nearly 8 billion lyr
FRB 200428	2020-04-28	19^{h} 35^{m}	+21° 54′	332.8	—	—	first ever detected FRB inside the Milky Way about 30,000 lyr; first ever linked to a known source: the magnetar SGR 1935+2154
FRB 201124	2020-11-24 08:50:41	05^{h} 08^{m}	+26° 11′	76 - 109	—	—	V low DMs. Very high repeating burst activity reported to have begun 23 March 2021, includes an "extremely bright" pulse on 15 April 2021.
FRB 240114	2024-01-14 21:20:11	21^{h} 28^{m}	+04:20°	527.7	Width	Peak flux	multiple repeating FRB bursts.

== See also ==
- Fast blue optical transient
- Gamma-ray burst
