= Canadian Hydrogen Intensity Mapping Experiment =

Canadian radio telescope

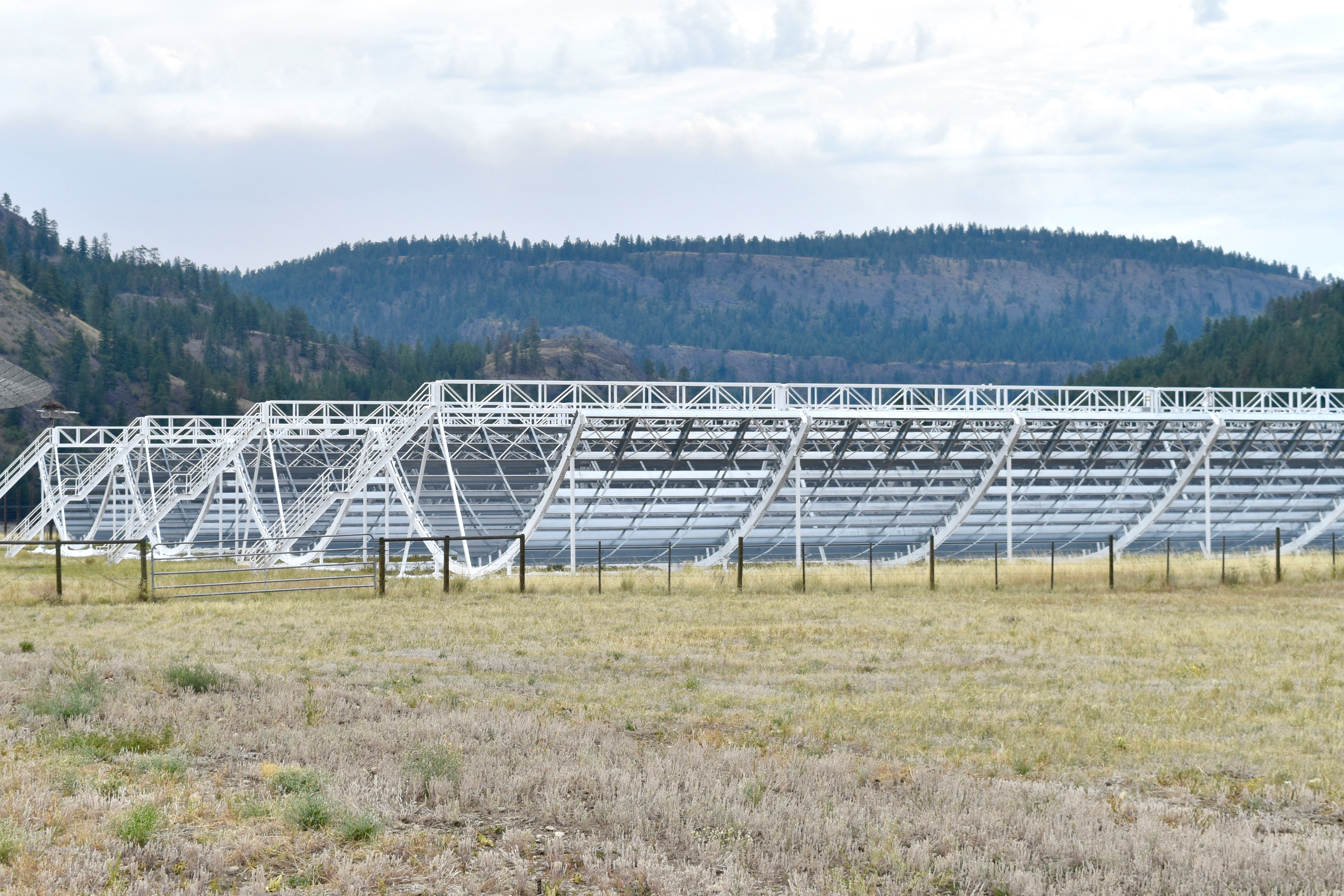
- CHIME telescope
- Location: Okanagan Falls, Regional District of Okanagan-Similkameen, British Columbia, Canada
- Coordinates: 49°19′15″N 119°37′25″W
- Organization: Dominion Radio Astrophysical Observatory; McGill University; University of British Columbia; University of Toronto
- Altitude: 545 m (1,788 ft)
- Wavelength: 37 cm (810 MHz)–75 cm (400 MHz)
- Length: 100 m (328 ft 1 in)
- Width: 20 m (65 ft 7 in)
- Collecting area: 8,000 m^{2} (86,000 sq ft)
- Website: chime-experiment.ca
- Location within Canada
- Related media on Commons

The Canadian Hydrogen Intensity Mapping Experiment (CHIME) is an interferometric radio telescope at the Dominion Radio Astrophysical Observatory in British Columbia, Canada which consists of four antennas consisting of 100 x 20 metre cylindrical parabolic reflectors with 1024 dual-polarization radio receivers suspended on a support above them. The antenna receives radio waves from hydrogen in space at frequencies in the 400–800 MHz range. The telescope's low-noise amplifiers are built with components adapted from the cellphone industry and its data processed using a custom-built FPGA electronic system and 1000-processor high-performance GPGPU cluster. The telescope has no moving parts and observes half of the sky each day as the Earth turns.

It is also an effective instrument in the detection of fast radio bursts (FRBs).

CHIME is a partnership between the University of British Columbia, McGill University, the University of Toronto and the Canadian National Research Council's Dominion Radio Astrophysical Observatory. A first light ceremony was held on 7 September 2017 to inaugurate the commissioning phase.

== Science goals ==
=== Cosmology ===
One of the biggest puzzles in contemporary cosmology is why the expansion of the Universe is accelerating. About seventy percent of the Universe today consists of dark energy that counteracts gravity's attractive force and causes this acceleration. Very little is known about what dark energy is. CHIME is in the process of making precise measurements of the acceleration of the Universe to improve the knowledge of how dark energy behaves. The experiment is designed to observe the period in the Universe's history during which the standard ΛCDM model predicts that dark energy began to dominate the energy density of the Universe and when decelerated expansion transitioned to acceleration.

CHIME will make other observations in addition to its main, cosmological purpose. CHIME's daily survey of the sky will enable study of the Milky Way galaxy in radio frequencies, and is expected to improve the understanding of galactic magnetic fields.

CHIME will also help other experiments to calibrate measurements of radio waves from rapidly spinning neutron stars, which researchers hope to use to detect gravitational waves.

=== Radio transients ===
CHIME is being used for discovering and monitoring pulsars and other radio transients; a specialised instrument was developed for these science objectives. The telescope monitors 10 pulsars at a time around the clock to watch for variation in their time-keeping that might indicate a passing gravitational wave. CHIME is able to detect the mysterious extragalactic fast radio bursts (FRBs) that last just milliseconds and have no well established astrophysical explanation.

=== 21-cm absorbers ===
21-cm absorption systems are signatures of cold neutral hydrogen gas detected in radio spectra, and serve as sensitive probes of gas reservoirs in and around galaxies across cosmic time. CHIME's 400–800 MHz frequency band is sensitive to the hyperfine 21-cm line of neutral hydrogen (HI) redshifted into the range z ≈ 0.78–2.55, making it well suited for conducting blind surveys for 21-cm absorbers. The CHIME 21-cm Absorber Project carries out such a survey, searching for cold neutral gas along the lines of sight to bright continuum radio sources across CHIME's wide field of view. In 2026, the project reported the discovery of a 21-cm absorption system at redshift z = 2.327 associated with a quasar, representing one of the highest-redshift associated HI absorbers detected to date. The detection demonstrates the viability of CHIME's wide-field transit strategy for probing the cold gas in the high-redshift universe.

== Method ==
The instrument is a hybrid semi-cylindrical interferometer designed to measure the large scale neutral hydrogen power spectrum across the redshift range 0.8 to 2.5. The power spectrum will be used to measure the baryon acoustic oscillation (BAO) scale across this redshift range where dark energy becomes a significant contributor to the evolution of the Universe.

CHIME is sensitive to the 21 cm radio waves emitted by clouds of neutral hydrogen in distant galaxies, and is sensitive to the red shifted waves. By measuring the distribution of the hydrogen in the Universe—a technique known as intensity mapping—CHIME will make a 3D map of the large-scale structure of the Universe between redshifts of 0.8 and 2.5, when the Universe was between about 2.5 and 7 billion years old. CHIME will thus map over 3% of the total observable volume of the Universe, substantially more than has been achieved by large-scale structure surveys to date, during an epoch when the Universe is largely unobserved. Maps of large-scale structure can be used to measure the expansion history of the Universe because sound waves in the early Universe, or baryon acoustic oscillations (BAO), have left slight overdensities in the distribution of matter on scales of about 500 million light-years. This characteristic BAO scale has been well-measured by experiments like Planck and can therefore be used as a 'standard ruler' to determine the size of the Universe as a function of time, thereby indicating the expansion rate.

BAO measurements to date have been made by observing the distribution of galaxies on the sky. While future experiments, like The Dark Energy Survey, Euclid and the Dark Energy Spectroscopic Instrument (DESI), will continue using this technique, CHIME is a pioneer in using the radio emission of hydrogen rather than the starlight as a tracer of structure for detecting BAO. Although CHIME cannot be used for the same auxiliary science that galaxy surveys excel at, for BAO measurement CHIME represents a very cost-effective alternative as individual galaxies do not need to be observed.

== Technology ==
The choice to use a few elongated reflectors rather than many circular dishes is unusual but not original to CHIME: other examples of semi-cylindrical telescopes are the Molonglo Observatory Synthesis Telescope in Australia and the Northern Cross Radio Telescope in Italy. This design was chosen for CHIME as a cost-effective way of arranging close-packed radio antennas so that the telescope can observe the sky at a wide range of angular scales. Using multiple, parallel semi-cylinders gives comparable resolution along both axes of the telescope.

The antennas are custom-designed for CHIME to have good response in the 400 to 800 MHz range in two linear polarisations. The Teflon-based printed circuit board antennas in the shape of cloverleaf petals are located along the focal line of each of the wire-mesh half pipe reflectors. There are baluns that combine differential signals from two adjacent cloverleaf petals into one single-ended signal. There are four petals in each antenna, providing two analogue outputs. With 256 antennas per reflector and the total of four reflectors, the telescope has the combined 2,048 analogue outputs to be processed. Signal from the antennas are amplified in two stages that make use of technology developed by the cell-phone industry. This allows CHIME to keep the analogue chain at relatively low noise while still being affordable. Each radio frequency output from the antennas is amplified by a low-noise amplifier which is co-located. The outputs from the amplifiers travels through coaxial cables at the length of 60 metres (200 ft) to the processors inside shielded containers called F-engines.

CHIME is operated as a correlator, meaning that the inputs from all the antennas are combined so that the entire system operates as one system. This requires considerable computing power. The analogue signals are digitised at 800 MHz and processed using a combination of custom-built field-programmable gate arrays (FPGA) circuit boards and graphics processing units (GPU). The Pathfinder has a fully functional correlator made from these units, and has demonstrated that consumer-grade GPU technology provides sufficient processing power for CHIME at a fraction of the price of other radio correlators. There are two F-engine containers located between two adjacent reflectors. Inside the F-engine containers, the analogue signals are band-pass filtered and amplified, then digitized by 8-bit analogue-to-digital converters at operational sampling rate of 800 million samples per second. The result is the telescope's digital data rate of 13.11 terabits per second. The digital data is processed by the FPGA-based F-engines to organize into frequency bins. The data is then sent over optical cables to the X-engine container located next to the telescope. X-engine, which has 256 processing nodes with GPUs, performs the correlating and averaging of the F-engine data. An advantage of using GPUs in the X-engine design is the ease of programming. However, that comes with the cost of higher power consumption when compared to an FPGA solution. The telescope consumes 250 kilowatts of power.

Components

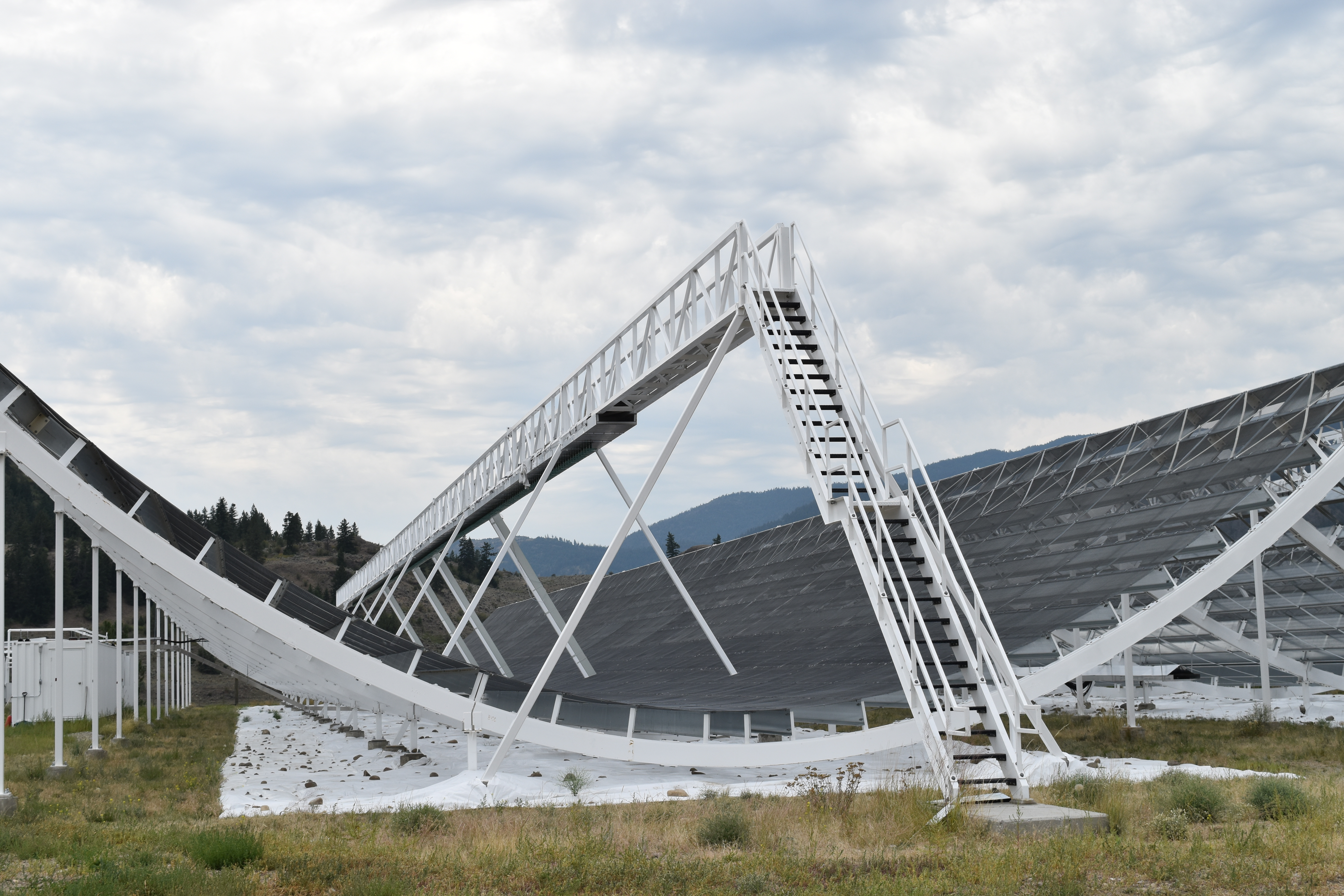
One of the four wire-mesh half pipe reflectors

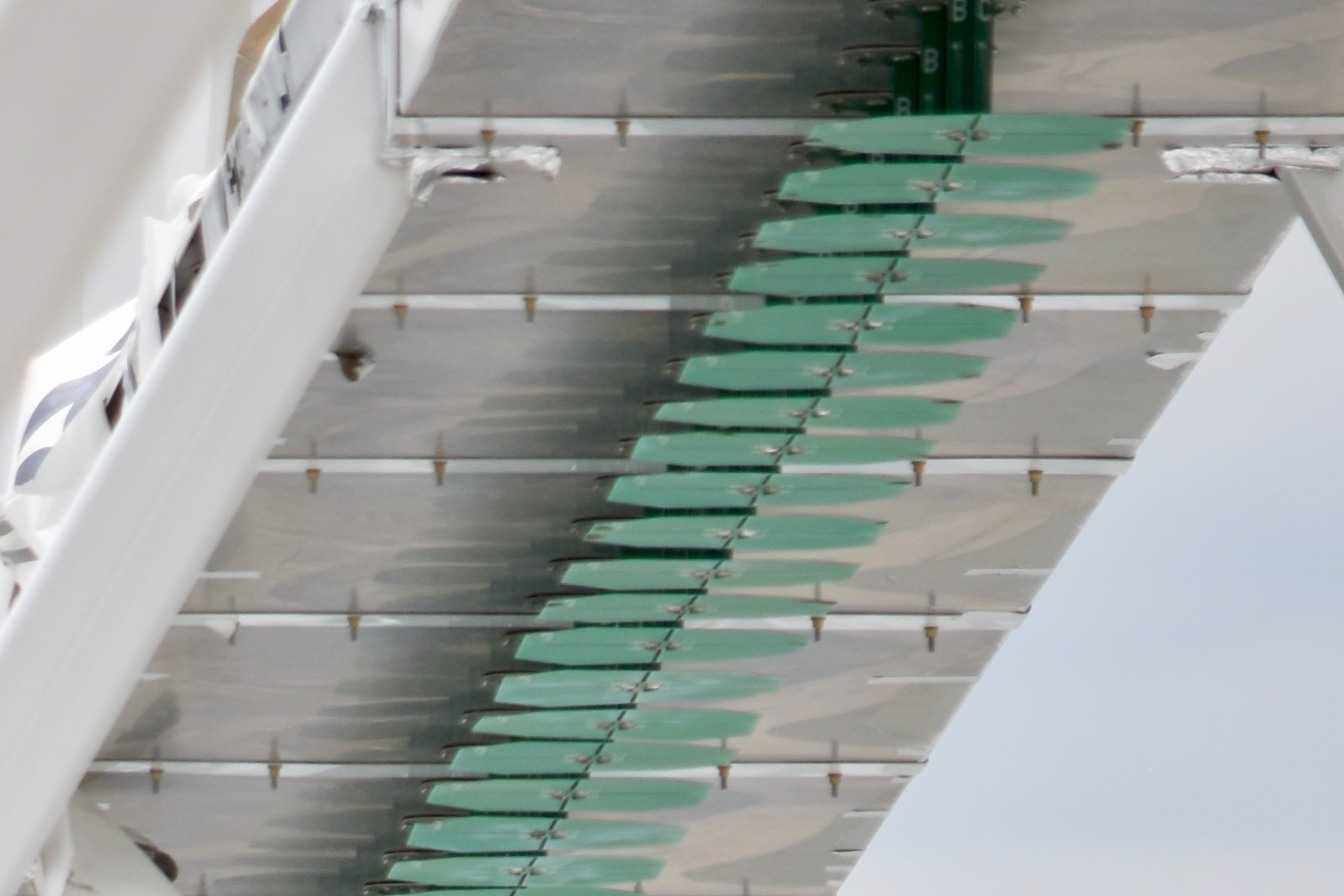
Cloverleaf-shaped antennas at the focal line

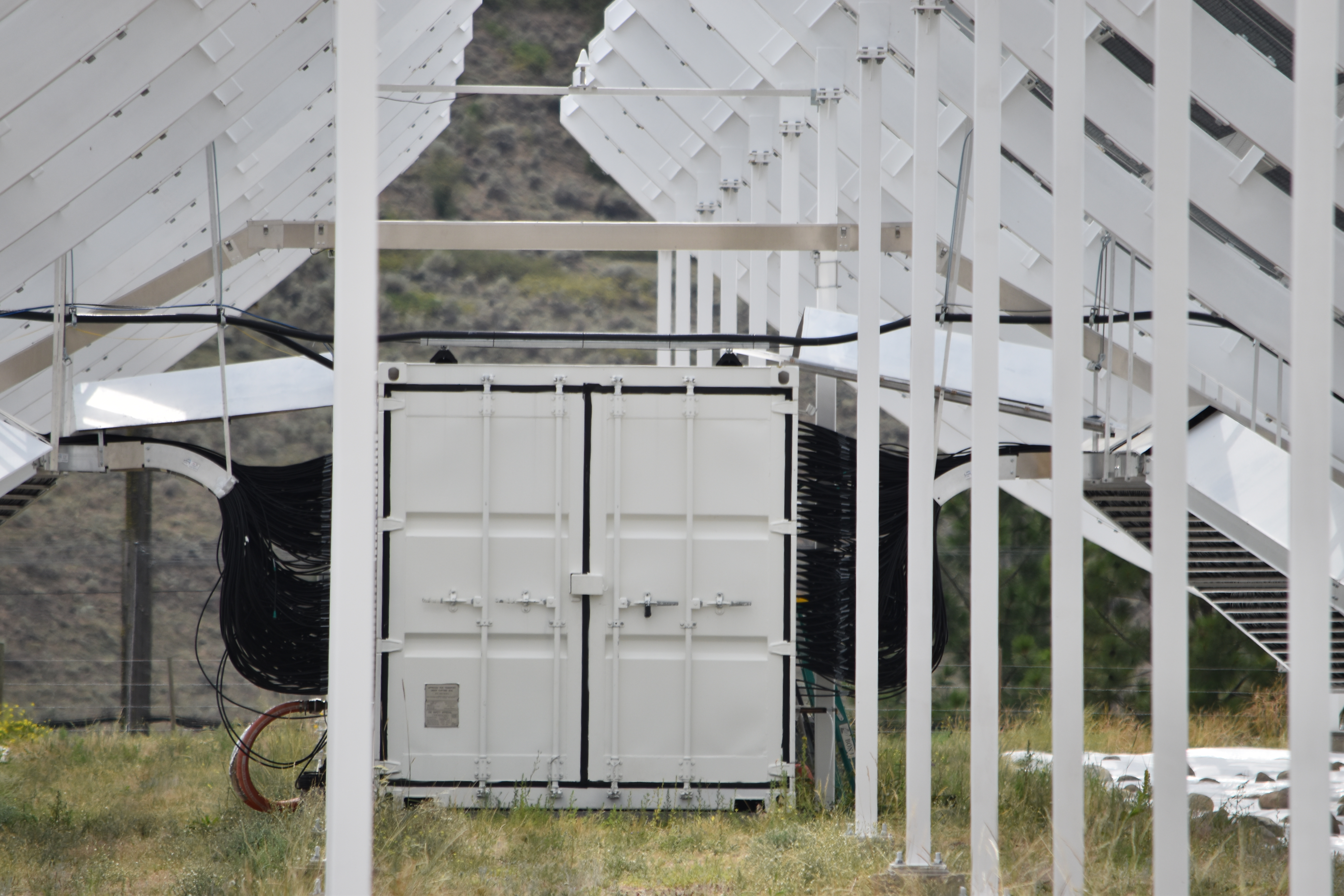
An F-engine located between two adjacent reflectors

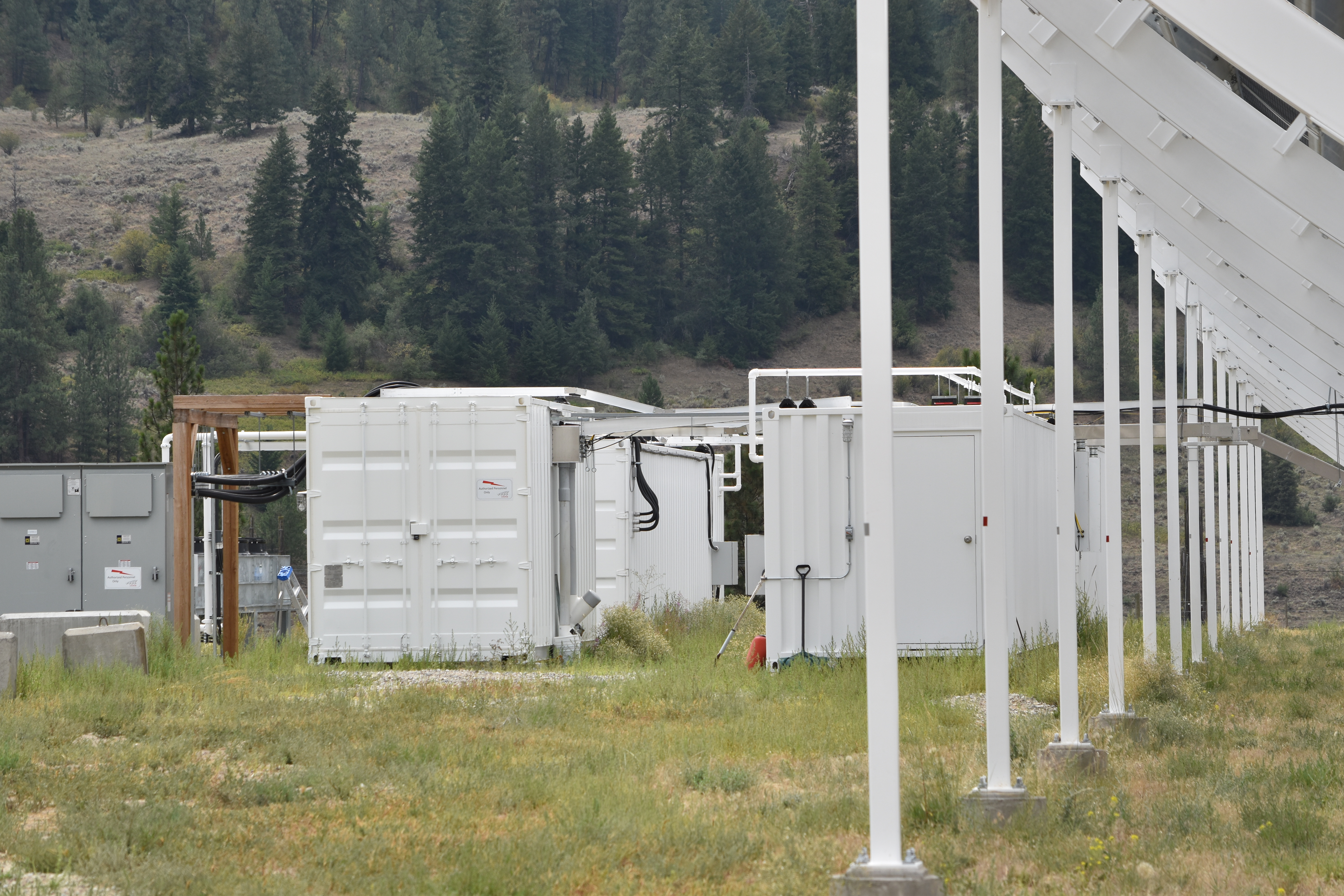
The X-engine located next the CHIME telescope

== History ==
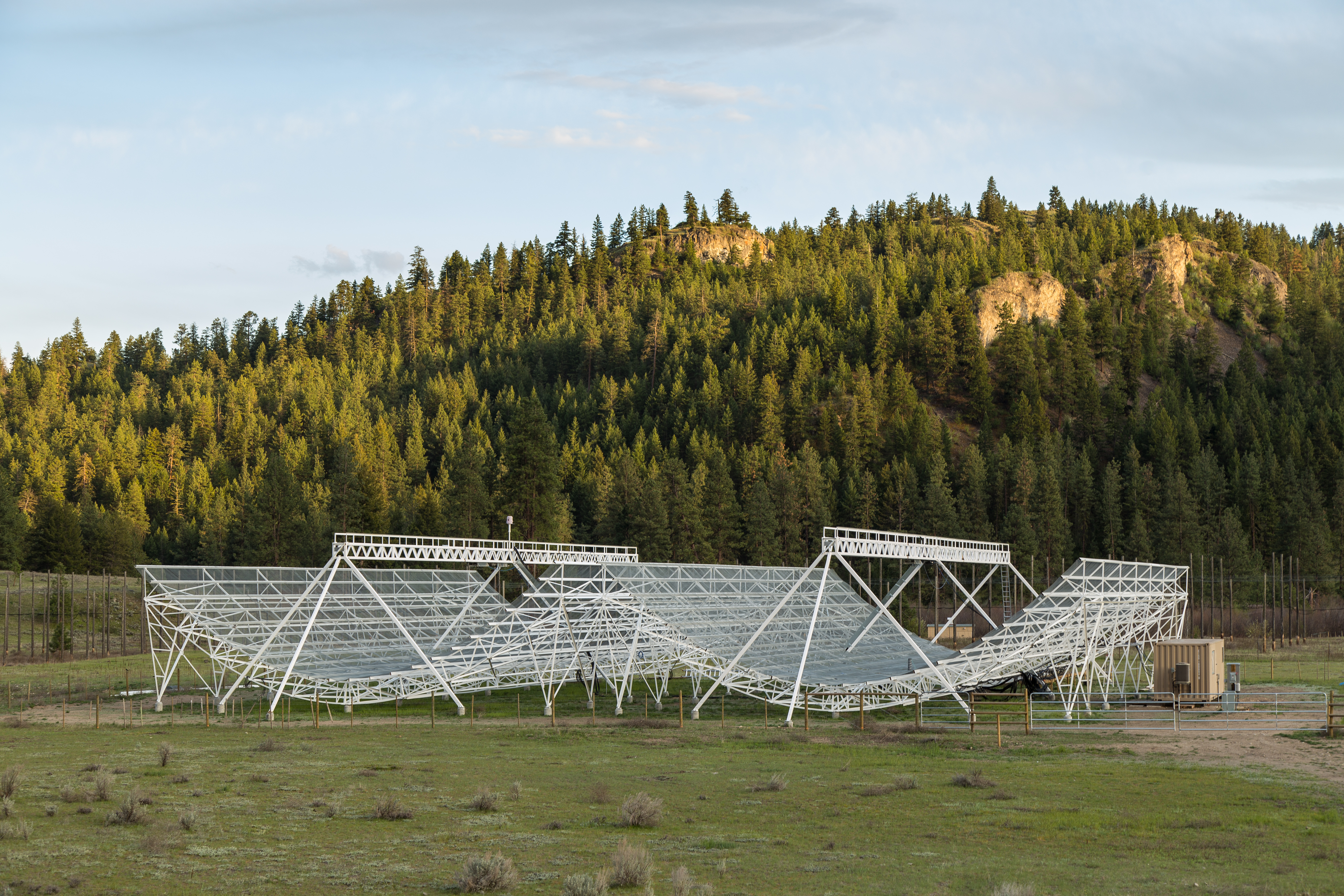
The CHIME Pathfinder telescope, a prototype for the full CHIME telescope.

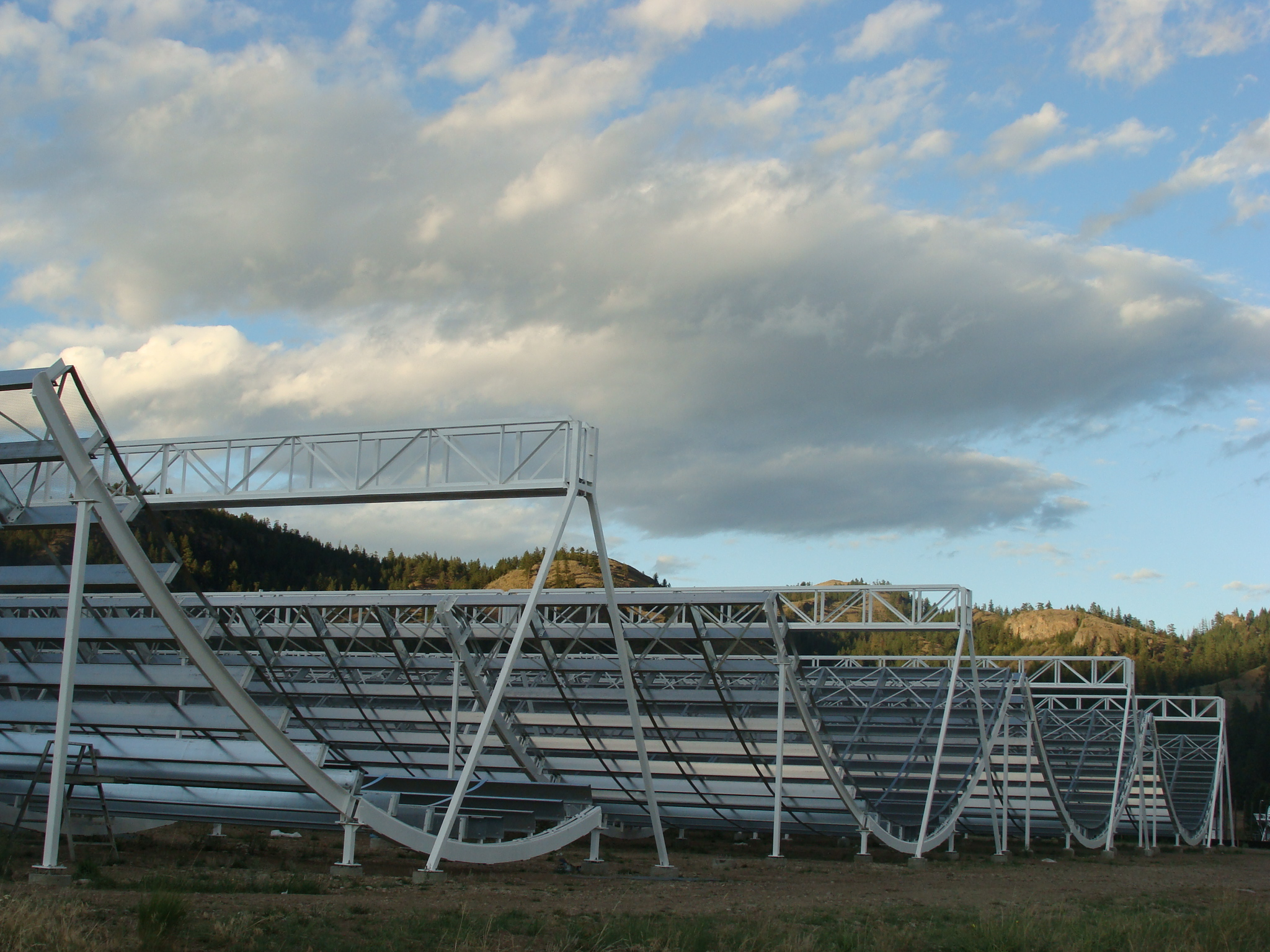
CHIME experiment construction in July, 2015

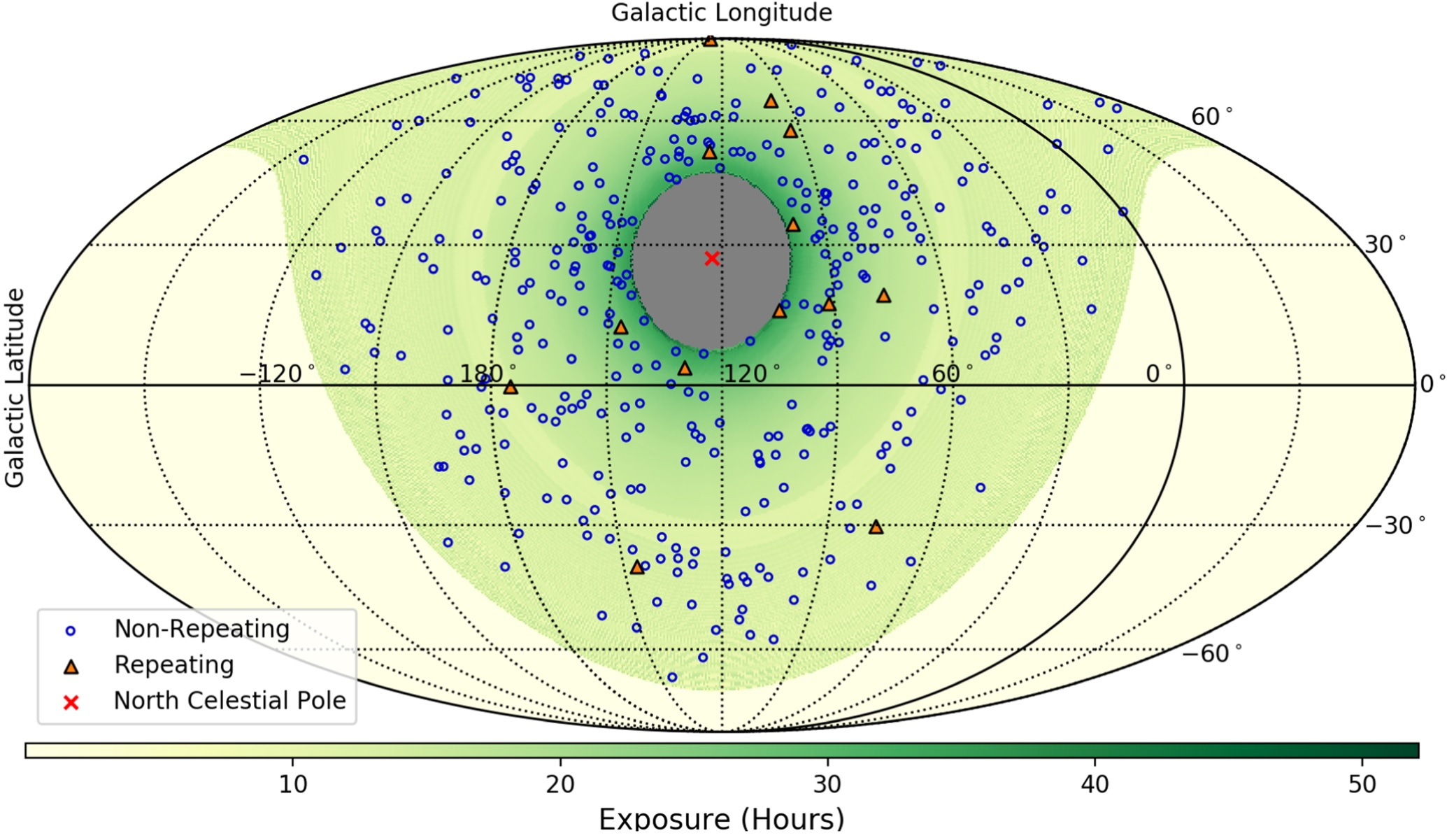
FRBs observed by CHIME in Galactic coordinates with locations of 474 nonrepeating and 18 repeating (62 bursts) sources from 28 August 2018 to 1 July 2019

In 2013, the CHIME Pathfinder telescope was built, also at DRAO. It is a smaller-scale version of the full instrument, consisting of two, 36 x 20 metre semi-cylinders populated by 128 dual-polarization antennas, and is currently being used as a testbed for CHIME technology and observing techniques. Additionally, the Pathfinder will also be capable of making an initial measurement of the baryon acoustic oscillations (BAO) with the intensity mapping technique and will become a useful telescope in its own right.

=== Construction ===
Construction of CHIME began in 2015 at the Dominion Radio Astrophysical Observatory (DRAO) near Penticton, British Columbia, Canada. In November 2015, CHIME was reported to be "nearly operational", requiring the installation of receivers, and construction of the super-computer. In March 2016 the contract for the processing chips was placed.

CHIME construction ended in August 2017. A first light ceremony with federal Minister of Science Kirsty Duncan was held on 7 September 2017 to inaugurate the commissioning phase.

=== Science operations ===
The science operations commenced in late September 2018, and began to detect several events within its first week.

One of the early discoveries of the CHIME/Fast Radio Burst Project (CHIME/FRB) was the second repeating FRB to be observed, FRB 180814. CHIME/FRB also discovered the first FRB that repeats at regular intervals: 180916.J0158+65 has a periodicity of 16.35 days. At a distance of only 500 million light years, it is also the closest FRB ever discovered.

CHIME is so sensitive it was expected to eventually detect dozens of FRBs per day. The CHIME/FRB Catalog 1 reported 536 FRBs for the July 2018 - 2019 year.

A key milestone was the detection FRB 200428 on 2020-04-28 which was the first FRB for which emissions other than radio waves have been detected, the first to be found in the Milky Way, and the first to be associated with a magnetar.

In 2022, funding was decided for construction of three outrigger sites to localise the FRB sources.

In January 2025, astronomers reported having used CHIME to detect multiple FRBs from a galaxy about 2 billion light years from Earth, more than 11 billion years old and long-believed to be dead.

== See also ==
- List of radio telescopes
- Hydrogen Intensity and Real-time Analysis eXperiment (HIRAX), a proposed radio telescope array in South Africa in the same frequency band as CHIME
- Canadian Hydrogen Observatory and Radio-transient Detector (CHORD), the successor to CHIME currently under construction at the Dominion Radio Astrophysical Observatory. The CHORD array consists of 512 six-meter composite dish antennas operating in drift-scan mode across 300-1500 MHz bandwidth.
