= NIOBE =

Gravitational-wave detector

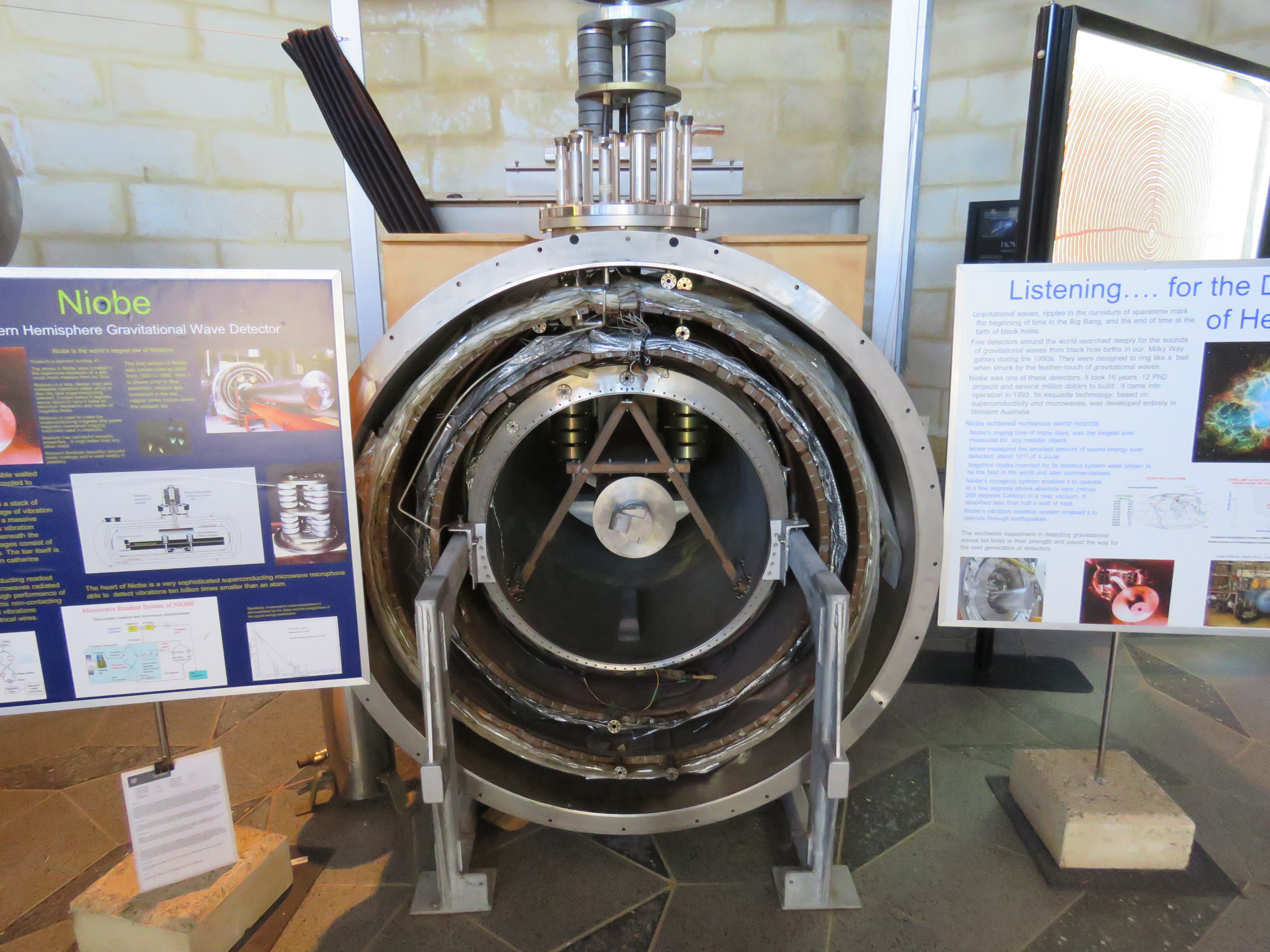
NIOBE on display at the Gravity Discovery Centre

Niobe was a ground-based, cryogenic niobium resonant bar gravitational-wave detector. The detector used a microwave parametric transducer readout to improve noise performance and detector bandwidth. The detector was run by David Blair at University of Western Australia in Perth. The detector ran in joint science runs from 1993 to 1998 with the gravitational-wave detectors Auriga, Allegro, Explorer and Nautillus. No results were found, but the experiments helped develop the next generation.

== See also ==
- Gravitational-wave astronomy
