= David Douglass =

David Douglass may refer to:

- David Douglass (actor) (1720–1786), British-American stage actor and theatre manager
- David Bates Douglass (1790–1849), civil and military engineer
- David Douglass (physicist) (born 1932), American physicist
- David F. Douglass, member of the California legislature
- David John Douglass, English political activist and writer

== See also ==
- David Douglas (disambiguation)
