= Joseph Weber =

American physicist (1919-2000)

Joe Weber
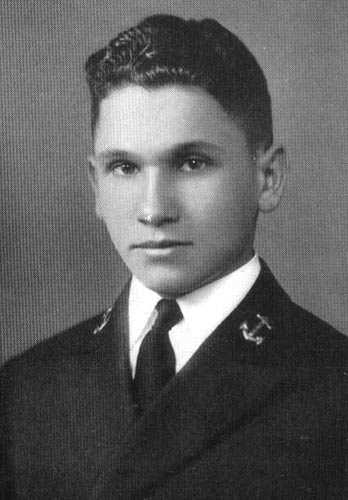
- Weber depicted in US Naval Academy uniform in 1940.
- Born: May 17, 1919; Paterson, New Jersey, USA
- Died: September 30, 2000 (aged 81); Pittsburgh, Pennsylvania
- Resting place: United States Naval Academy, Annapolis, Maryland
- Education: United States Naval Academy; Naval Postgraduate School; The Catholic University of America
- Known for: Weber bars Quantum electronics Gravitational wave detection Maser; Laser
- Spouses: Anita Straus (1942 - 1971; her death); Virginia Trimble (1972 - 2000; his death)
- Awards: Guggenheim Fellowship (1955, 1962); National Research Council Fellowship (1955); Scientific Achievement Award from the Washington Academy of Sciences (1958); Babson Award of the Gravity Research Foundation (1959); Fellow of the American Physical Society; Fulbright Scholarship (1963); Sigma Xi (1970); Boris Pregel Prize of the New York Academy of Sciences (1973); Maryland engineering hall of fame (1988)
- Scientific career
- Fields: Physics
- Workplaces: University of Maryland College Park; Institute for Advanced Study, Princeton; US Navy Bureau of Ships
- Thesis: Microwave Technique in Chemical Kinetics (1951)
- Doctoral advisor: Keith J. Laidler
- Doctoral students: Robert L. Forward

Joseph Weber (May 17, 1919 – September 30, 2000) was an American physicist. He gave the earliest public lecture on the principles behind the laser and the maser and developed the first gravitational wave detectors, known as Weber bars.

== Early life ==
Joseph Weber was born in Paterson, New Jersey, on 17 May 1919, the last of four children born to Yiddish-speaking Jewish immigrant parents. His name was "Yonah" until he entered grammar school. He had no birth certificate, and his father had taken the last name of "Weber" to match an available passport in order to emigrate to the US. Thus, Joe Weber had little proof of either his family or his given name, which gave him some trouble in obtaining a passport at the height of the red scare.

When he was five he was hit by a bus, and lost the ability to talk. After learning how to talk again, his Yiddish-influenced accent was gone and had been replaced by the middle-American diction of his speech therapist.

== Early education ==
Weber attended Paterson public schools (and the Paterson Talmud Torah), graduating at sixteen from the "Mechanic Arts Course" of Paterson Eastside High School in June 1935. He began his undergraduate education at Cooper Union, but to save his family the expense of his room and board he won admittance to the United States Naval Academy through a competitive exam. He graduated from the Academy in 1940.

== Naval career ==
He served aboard US Navy ships during World War II, rising to the rank of lieutenant commander. Weber was the Officer of the Deck on the USS Lexington when the ship received word of the attack on Pearl Harbor. In the Battle of the Coral Sea his carrier sank the Japanese aircraft carrier Shōhō and was in turn mortally damaged on May 8, 1942. Weber often regaled his students with the story of how the Lexington glowed incandescent as she slipped beneath the waves.

Later, he commanded the sub-chaser SC-690, first in the Caribbean, and later in the Mediterranean Sea. In that role, he took part in the invasion of Sicily at Gela Beach, in July 1943.

He studied electronics at the Naval Postgraduate School in 1943-45, and from 1945 to 1948, he headed electronic countermeasures design for the Navy's Bureau of Ships, in Washington, DC. He resigned from the navy as a lieutenant commander in 1948 to become a professor of engineering.

== Early post-naval career; development of the MASER ==
In 1948, he joined the engineering faculty of the University of Maryland, College Park. A condition of his appointment was that he should quickly attain a PhD. Thus, he did his PhD studies, on microwave spectroscopy, at night, while already a faculty member. He completed his PhD, with a thesis entitled Microwave Technique in Chemical Kinetics, from The Catholic University of America in 1951. Building on his naval expertise in tube microwave engineering, he worked out the idea of coherent microwave emissions. He submitted a paper in 1951 for the June 1952 Electron Tube Research Conference held in Ottawa, which was the earliest public lecture on the principles behind the laser and the maser. After this presentation, RCA asked Weber to give a seminar on this idea, and Charles Hard Townes asked him for a copy of the paper. Townes was working along similar lines, as were Nikolay Basov and Aleksandr Prokhorov. Although Weber was jointly nominated for the Nobel Prize in Physics in 1962 and 1963 for his contributions to the development of the laser, it was Townes, Basov, and Prokhorov, who received the 1964 Nobel Prize, "for fundamental work in the field of quantum electronics, which has led to the construction of oscillators and amplifiers based on the maser–laser principle."

== Work on gravitational wave detection ==
His interest in general relativity led Weber to use a 1955–1956 sabbatical, funded by a Guggenheim Fellowship, to study gravitational radiation with John Archibald Wheeler at the Institute for Advanced Study in Princeton, NJ and the Lorentz Institute for Theoretical Physics at the University of Leiden in the Netherlands. At the time, the existence of gravitational waves was not widely accepted. In 1957 he attended a conference where Richard Feynman described the sticky bead argument, a thought experiment about how to detect these waves. Weber then published his first paper on how to build a gravity wave detector in 1959, followed by a second paper the year after, and in 1961 he joined the physics department at the University of Maryland as a full professor, where he the same year set about developing a gravitational wave detector.

His first detector (Weber bar) became operational in 1965, and he began reporting experimental results in 1966. At a general relativity conference in 1969, he announced that he had detected gravitational waves.

In 1972, he sent a gravitational wave detection apparatus to the Moon (the "Lunar Surface Gravimeter," part of the Apollo Lunar Surface Experiments Package) on the Apollo 17 lunar mission.

=== Claims of gravitational wave detection discredited ===
In the 1970s, the results of these gravitational wave experiments were largely discredited, although Weber continued to argue that he had detected gravitational waves. In order to test Weber's results, IBM Physicist Richard Garwin built a detector that was similar to Joseph Weber's. In six months, it detected only one pulse, which was most likely noise. David Douglass, another physicist, had discovered an error in Weber's computer program that, he claimed, produced the daily gravitational wave signals that Weber claimed to have detected. Dr. Weber had allowed for noise with random amplitude, but he had not allowed for random phase. Because of the error, a signal seemed to appear out of noise. Garwin aggressively confronted Weber with this information at the Fifth Cambridge Conference on Relativity at MIT in June 1974. A series of letters was then exchanged in Physics Today. Garwin asserted that Weber's model was "insane, because the universe would convert all of its energy into gravitational radiation in 50 million years or so, if one were really detecting what Joe Weber was detecting." "Weber," Garwin declared, "is just such a character that he has not said, 'No, I never did see a gravity wave.' And the National Science Foundation, unfortunately, which funded that work, is not man enough to clean the record, which they should." In 1972, Heinz Billing and colleagues at Max Planck Institute for Physics built a detector similar to Weber's in an attempt to verify his claim but found no results. In 1987, Weber lost his primary funding after Garwin wrote letters to the National Science Foundation where he suggested they should stop funding the project. For the rest of his life, he continued his research by raising funds on his own.

=== Discovery of gravitational waves by LIGO ===
On February 11, 2016, the LIGO Scientific Collaboration and Virgo Collaboration teams held a press conference to announce that they had directly detected gravitational waves from a pair of black holes merging, on Rosh Hashanah 2015, (Weber's yahrtzeit), using the Advanced LIGO detectors. During the announcement, Weber was credited by numerous speakers as the founder of the field, including by Kip Thorne, who co-founded LIGO and also devoted much of his career to the search for gravitational waves. Later, Thorne told the Washington Post, "He really is the founding father of this field." Weber's second wife, astronomer Virginia Trimble, was seated in the front row of the audience during the LIGO press conference. In an interview with Science afterwards, Trimble was asked if Weber really saw gravitational waves, to which she replied: "I don't know. But I think if there had been two technologies going forward they would have pushed each other, as collaborators not as competitors, and it might have led to an observation sooner."

== Work on neutrino detection ==
In the course of defending his work on gravitational wave detection, Weber began related work on neutrino detection. Assuming infinite crystal stiffness, Weber calculated that it could be possible to detect neutrinos using sapphire crystals, and published experimental results on neutrino scattering with these crystals. Weber also patented the idea of using vibrating crystals to generate neutrinos. His experimental results contradicted previous and subsequent findings from other experiments, but Weber's neutrino theories continue to be tested.

== Legacy ==
Although his attempts to find gravitational waves with bar detectors are considered to have failed, Weber is widely regarded as the father of gravitational wave detection efforts, including LIGO, MiniGrail, and several HFGW research programs around the world. His notebooks contained ideas for laser interferometers; later such a detector was first constructed by his former student Robert Forward at Hughes Research Laboratories.

Joe Weber was the first ... Following our work together in Leiden, he embraced gravitational waves with religious fervor and has pursued them for the rest of his professional career. I sometimes ask myself whether I imbued in Weber too great an enthusiasm for such a monumentally difficult task. Whether, in the end, he is the first to detect gravitational waves or whether someone else, or some other group does it, hardly matters. In fact, he will deserve the credit for leading the way. No one else had the courage to look for gravitational waves until Weber showed that it was within the realm of the possible.

— John Archibald Wheeler, Geons, Black Holes, and Quantum Foam: A Life in Physics, pp. 257-258.

The whole gravitational wave community realizes that he's really the father of gravitational wave research. And I think the general feeling is that they regret that they didn't give him more honors towards the end of his life, because he was so convinced that he had already seen gravitational waves that every opportunity to honor him would be turned into some kind of springboard from which he would preach this gospel of "we've already seen it," which was widely rejected. Even the people who knew that they couldn't produce LIGO and other things if he were given too big a platform to say "it's not necessary because it's already been done" recognize that the whole effort would never have been started if he hadn't shown the world that you could take gravitational waves seriously. Before him nobody did. Einstein looked at them and dismissed them. So did other people. Said yes, they should be there but they can't be measured, so stop thinking about it.

— Charles W. Misner, "Interview of Charles Misner by Christopher Smee,"

Before Weber, I don't think anyone had ever spent more than 10 minutes trying to understand how to detect gravitational waves in the lab...(LIGO) was such a difficult thing to get built, that if it had started 10 years later, it would have hit a political wall...It might have been another century before anyone discovered gravitational waves.

— Charles W. Misner, "Remarks at the Dedication of the Weber Memorial Garden outside the Physical Sciences Complex at the University of Maryland, March 12, 2019,"

The Joseph Weber Award for Astronomical Instrumentation was named in his honor.

== Personal life ==
His first marriage, to his high school classmate Anita Straus, ended with her death in 1971. His second marriage was to astronomer Virginia Trimble. He had four sons (from his first marriage), and six grandchildren.

Joseph Weber died on 30 September 2000 in Pittsburgh, Pennsylvania, during treatment for lymphoma that had been diagnosed about three years earlier.
