= Torsion-bar antenna =

Gravitational-wave detector

A torsion-bar antenna (TOBA) is a novel scheme for a gravitational wave detector, proposed by M. Ando, et al. in 2010. The proposed design is composed of two, long, thin bars, suspended as torsion pendula in a cross-like fashion. Their differential angle (sensitive to tidal gravitational wave forces) would be compared using a set of optical cavities with one end mirror of each cavity fixed to the ends of each bar. Such a detector could be fashioned either for ground-based or space-based use.

The predicted frequency band over which such a detector would be most sensitive would be centered on 1 Hz, similar to DECIGO. This frequency range would complement current ground-based, laser interferometric detectors (whose sensitive band is between 10–100 Hz and several kHz, such as LIGO or Virgo), and proposed space-based, laser interferometric detectors (such as LISA whose sensitive band is centered on 10^{−4} Hz).
