= Mount Douglas =

Mount Douglas or Mount Doug may refer to:

== Mountains ==
=== Antarctica ===
- Mount Douglas (Antarctica)

=== Canada ===
- Mount Douglas, near Welsford, New Brunswick
- Mount Douglas, Saanich, in Greater Victoria, British Columbia
  - Mount Douglas Secondary School, a grade 9-12 public school not far from the mountain
- Mount Howard Douglas, Alberta
- Mount Sir Douglas, on the border of Alberta and British Columbia

=== United States ===
- Mount Douglas (Alaska)
- Mount Douglas (Montana)
- Mount David Douglas, Oregon

== See also ==
- Douglas Mountain (disambiguation)
- Douglas Peak (disambiguation)
- Douglas Peaks, Antarctica
- Mount Douglass, Antarctica
