= David Douglas =

David or Dave Douglas may refer to:

== Entertainment ==
- David Douglas (director) (born 1953), Canadian cinematographer, director and writer
- Dave Douglas (trumpeter) (born 1963), American jazz trumpeter
- Dave Douglas (drummer) (born 1979), American drummer
- David Douglas, character in An Act of Murder

== Nobility ==
- David Douglas, 12th Marquess of Queensberry (born 1929), Scottish nobleman
- David Douglas, 7th Earl of Angus (c. 1515–1558), Scottish nobleman

== Sports ==
- Dave Douglas (golfer) (1918–1978), American professional golfer
- David Douglas (offensive lineman) (1963–2016), American football player
- David Douglas (rower) (born 1947), Australian
- David Douglas (fighter) (born 1982), American mixed martial arts fighter
- David Douglas (wide receiver) (born 1989), American football wide receiver

== Other ==
- David Douglas, Lord Reston (1769–1819), Scottish judge and Adam Smith's heir
- David Douglas (botanist) (1799–1834), Scottish botanist
- David Douglas (publisher) (1823–1918), Scottish publisher
- David L. Douglas (1845–1913), American businessman and politician
- David C. Douglas (1898–1982), British historian of the Normans
- David "Dathaí" Douglas (died 2016), Irish criminal, see murder of David Douglas
- David Douglas High School, a public high school in Portland, Oregon

== See also ==
- David Douglass (disambiguation)
- David Douglas Duncan (1916–2018), American photojournalist
- David Douglas Wagener (1792–1860), U.S. politician
- Mount David Douglas, a mountain in Oregon named after the Scottish botanist
