= Taiji program =

Chinese space program

The Taiji program is a proposed Chinese satellite-based gravitational-wave observatory. It is scheduled for launch in 2033 to study ripples in spacetime caused by gravitational waves. The program consists of a triangle of three spacecraft orbiting the Sun linked by laser interferometers.

Laser interferometer diagram: Assuming gravitational waves pass through the detector, the lengths of the two light storage arms can be calculated from measuring them $h_{+}\,$ and $h_{\times}\,$, the photodetector can therefore measure Amplitude difference, thus giving a value proportional to this differences $s(t)\,$。

There were initially two possible plans for the Taiji program, one to take a 20 percent share of the European Space Agency's LISA project, the other to launch China's own satellites by 2033 to authenticate the ESA project. In 2019 the first of three Taiji satellites, Taiji-1, was launched. Like LISA, the Taiji spacecraft would be 3 million kilometers apart, making them sensitive to a similar range of frequencies, although Taiji is proposed to perform better in some of that range.

== Program Goal ==
The main scientific goal of the Taiji program is to measure the mass, spin, and distribution of black holes through the precise measurement of gravitational waves. Additional goals are to:

- explore how intermediate-mass seed black holes develop if dark matter can produce black seed holes, and how enormous and supermassive black holes grow from black seed holes
- look for traces of the earliest generation of stars' genesis, development, and death
- give direct restrictions on the intensity of primordial gravitational waves
- detect the polarization of gravitational waves, providing direct observational data for revealing the nature of gravity

Gravitational waves can provide a clear picture of the universe because they are weakly linked to matter, and the information provided can be used in conjunction with information from telescopes and particle detectors. The precise measurement of gravitational waves allows for in-depth and thorough investigation of the universe's large-scale structure, the birth and development of galaxies. This may help better develop and establish a quantum theory of gravity beyond Einstein's general theory of relativity; reveal the nature of gravity; and help understand dark matter, the nature of energy, the formation of black holes, and cosmic inflation. Gravitational waves can transmit information that electromagnetic waves cannot. At the same time, the technology developed from this is of significance for improving the technical level of space science and deep space exploration; It will also play a positive role in applications such as inertial navigation, Earth science, global environmental change, and high-precision satellite platform construction.

Similar to the configuration of the three networking satellites in the LISA Program, the three satellites in the Taiji program also rotate around their centroid. The centroid also revolves in orbit around the Sun. The difference is that the phases of the LISA, Earth, and Taiji systems are different. The phase of the LISA system is 20 degrees behind the Earth, and the phase of the Taiji system is 20 degrees ahead of that of the Earth. In addition, the Taiji program is part of the proposed space-based gravitational wave observatories program, the other parts of which are the Chinese Academy of Sciences (CAS) Tianqin Program, the European Space Agency (ESA) Laser Interferometer Space Antenna (LISA), and the Deci-hertz Interferometer Gravitational Wave Observatory (DECIGO) led by the Japan Aerospace Exploration Agency (JAXA). In December 2021, a study pointed out that the gravitational wave detection network combined with Taiji and LISA will accurately measure the Hubble constant with an accuracy greater than 95.5% within ten years. Moreover, the LISA-Taiji network has the potential to detect more than twenty stellar binary black holes (sBBHs), for which the error in luminous distance measurement is in the range of 0.05−0.2 parsecs, and the relative error in sky positioning is in the range of 1−100 deg².

== Program history ==
In 2008, the Chinese Academy of Sciences began demonstrating the feasibility of space gravitational wave detection, proposing the "Taiji Program" for China's space gravitational wave detection, and establishing the "single satellite, dual satellite, three satellites" and "three steps" development strategy and road map. In August 2018, the "Taiji Program" single-satellite program was implemented in the Space Science (Phase II) Strategic Pilot Science and Technology Special Neutral Program, and the first step in the three-step process was launched—that is, the Taiji-1 satellite.

On August 31, 2019, the Taiji-1 satellite was launched from the Jiuquan Satellite Launch Center. In July 2021, "Taiji-1" completed all the preset experimental tasks and achieved the highest-precision space laser interferometry in China. The satellite achieved the first full performance verification of the two types of micro-push technology of Microbull-level radiofrequency, ion and Hall, and took the lead in realizing the breakthrough of two non-drug control technologies in China.

The optical metrology system and the non-resistance control system, both of which are slated to be part of Taiji-2 satellites, were confirmed by the Taiji-1 satellite mission. The mission's success also provided sufficient backing for the creation of the Taiji-2 satellite; however, because the Taiji-1 satellite has only one satellite, there is no way to test the inter-satellite laser link. The relevant unit expected to launch two satellites (Taiji-2) in 2023-2025 to clear obstacles for Taiji-3 satellites, but the target dates were not met, and it is now expected to launch sometime before 2030.

=== Program responsibility unit ===
The scientific application unit and user of Taiji-1 in this program is UCAS. The Taiji program and the ground support system are managed by China's National Space Science Center, while the satellite system is being developed by the Chinese Academy of Sciences, including their:

- Institute of Microsatellite Innovation
- Institute of Precision Measurement Science and Technology Innovation
- Institute of Mechanics
- Shanghai Institute of Optics and Fine Mechanics
- Changchun Institute of Optics and Fine Mechanics
- Singapore University of Science and Technology
- Singapore Nanyang Technological University

Additionally, the Chinese Academy of Sciences was involved in payload development and established the Taiji Cosmic Gravitational Wave Laboratory in Hangzhou in April 2021.
