= Zero-drag satellite =

Satellites where the payload follows a geodesic path through space

Zero-drag satellites or drag-free satellites are satellites where the payload follows a geodesic path through space only affected by gravity and not by non-gravitational forces such as drag of the residual atmosphere, light pressure and solar wind. A zero-drag satellite has two parts: an outer shell and an inner mass called the proof mass. The proof mass floats freely inside the outer shell, while the distance between the outer shell and the proof mass is constantly measured. When a change in the distance between the outer shell and the proof mass is detected, it means that the outer shell has been influenced by non-gravitational forces and moved relative to the proof mass. Thrusters on the outer shell will then reposition the outer shell relative to the proof mass so that its distance is the same as before the external influence changed it. The outer shell thus protects the proof mass from nearly all interactions with the outside that can cause acceleration, except those mediated by gravity, and by following the proof mass, the outer shell (which is to say, the rest of the spacecraft, carrying instruments, etc.) itself follows a geodesic path.

One way to think about a zero-drag satellite is to see the shell/proof mass setup as being an accelerometer, measuring the acceleration of the outer shell. The input from the accelerometer is then used to control the satellites thruster to exactly compensate for the measured acceleration, ensuring that over time the satellite has zero acceleration. Since the proof mass is floating free within the outer shell, neither the initial drag nor the thruster's compensation for it is experienced by the proof mass.

== Applications ==
Zero-drag satellites are used when it is instrumental for the satellite's mission that the payload remains on a near perfect geodesic path. Two such missions were NASA and Stanford University's Gravity Probe B (2004–2005) created to measure spacetime curvature near the Earth, and the ESA's GOCE spacecraft (2009–2013) which measured variations in the Earth's gravitational field.

Planned zero-drag satellites include the STEP experiment, and the LISA and DECIGO gravitational wave observatories.
