= European Gravitational Observatory =

Consortium managing the Virgo interferometric antenna in Pisa, Italy

Page name or Wikidata label
- Alternative names: EGO
- Location: Cascina, Province of Pisa, Tuscany, Italy
- Coordinates: 43°37′53″N 10°30′07″E
- Website: www.ego-gw.it
- Telescopes: Virgo interferometer

The European Gravitational Observatory (EGO) is a consortium established to manage the Virgo interferometer and its related infrastructure, as well as to promote cooperation in the field of gravitational wave research in Europe. It was founded December 11, 2000, by the French CNRS and Italian INFN, and is headquartered near Pisa, in the commune of Cascina.

== Overview ==
EGO is established under Italian law. Its governing body is a council composed of appointees nominated by the consortium members (up to three councilors per member). The Council appoints a Director who is the legal representative and chief executive of EGO.

A scientific advisory committee advises the council on scientific and technical activities carried out by the consortium. It is composed of up to ten scientific personalities.

EGO pursues these main objectives:

- ensures the functioning of the VIRGO antenna, its maintenance, its operation and the improvements to be made;
- ensures the maintenance of the related infrastructures, including a computer centre and promotes an open co-operation in R&D;
- ensures the maintenance of the site;
- carries out any other research in the field of gravitation of common interest for the Members;
- promotes the co-operation in the field of the experimental and theoretical gravitational waves research in Europe;
- promotes contacts among scientists and engineers, the dissemination of information and the provision of advanced training for young researchers.

=== Membership ===
The two founding members are the French CNRS and Italian INFN. The Dutch Nikhef joined as an observer in 2007 and a full member in early 2021. Institutions from Poland, Spain and Belgium joined EGO as observers in 2023, with the Belgian FWO and FNRS joining as full members in March 2025.

=== Budget ===
EGO has an annual budget of €9 million split evenly between the French CNRS and Italian INFN. It also receives contributions in kind from the Dutch Nikhef.

== See also ==
- List of astronomical observatories
