= STEP (satellite) =

The Satellite Test of the Equivalence Principle (STEP) is a proposed (as of 2014) space science experiment to test the equivalence principle of general relativity. The experiment is thought to be sensitive enough to test Einstein's theory of gravity and other theories.

The basic configuration is that of a drag-free satellite where an outer shell around an inner test mass is used to block solar wind, atmospheric drag, the Earth's magnetic field and other effects which might disturb the motion of a freely-falling inner object. It is designed for an expected sensitivity of one part in 10^{18}.

"Research on the STEP accelerometers began in 1971 at Stanford University, and has been supported since 1977 with NASA funding. STEP has been studied twice by ESA at the Phase-A level and has led two other space agencies (CNES and ASI) to study projects aimed at testing the Equivalence Principle in space. STEP is currently undergoing a Phase A study for NASA's office of Space Science Small Explorer program."

== See also ==
- MICROSCOPE (satellite), a similar experiment conducted by CNES
