= AURIGA =

Gravitational-wave detector

- Location(s): Padua, Province of Padua, Veneto, Italy
- Coordinates: 45°21′09″N 11°56′58″E
- Website: www.auriga.lnl.infn.it
- Location of AURIGA

AURIGA (Antenna Ultracriogenica Risonante per l'Indagine Gravitazionale Astronomica) is an ultracryogenic resonant bar gravitational wave detector in Italy. It is at the Laboratori Nazionali di Legnaro of the Istituto Nazionale di Fisica Nucleare, near Padua. It is being used for research into gravitational waves and quantum gravity.

When the oscillator is struck by a burst of gravitational waves, it is excited and continues to vibrate for a period longer than the duration of the wave burst. This sustained vibration allows the signal to be extracted from the detector.

== See also ==
- LIGO
- Weber bar
