= Gravitational-wave observatory =

Device used to measure gravitational waves

A schematic diagram of a laser interferometer.

A gravitational-wave detector (used in a gravitational-wave observatory) is any device designed to measure tiny distortions of spacetime called gravitational waves. Since the 1960s, various kinds of gravitational-wave detectors have been built and constantly improved. The present-day generation of laser interferometers has reached the necessary sensitivity to detect gravitational waves from astronomical sources, thus forming the primary tool of gravitational-wave astronomy.

The first direct observation of gravitational waves was made in September 2015 by the Advanced LIGO observatories, detecting gravitational waves with wavelengths of a few thousand kilometers from a merging binary of stellar black holes. In June 2023, four pulsar timing array collaborations presented the first strong evidence for a gravitational wave background of wavelengths spanning light years, most likely from many binaries of supermassive black holes.

== Challenge ==
The direct detection of gravitational waves is complicated by the extraordinarily small effect the waves produce on a detector. The amplitude of a spherical wave falls off as the inverse of the distance from the source. Thus, even waves from extreme systems such as merging binary black holes die out to a very small amplitude by the time they reach the Earth. Astrophysicists predicted that some gravitational waves passing the Earth might produce differential motion on the order 10^{−18} m in a LIGO-size instrument.

== Resonant mass antennas ==
A simple device to detect the expected wave motion is called a resonant mass antenna – a large, solid body of metal isolated from outside vibrations. This type of instrument was the first type of gravitational-wave detector. Strains in space due to an incident gravitational wave excite the body's resonant frequency and could thus be amplified to detectable levels. Conceivably, a nearby supernova might be strong enough to be seen without resonant amplification. However, up to 2018, no gravitational wave observation that would have been widely accepted by the research community has been made on any type of resonant mass antenna, despite certain claims of observation by researchers operating the antennas.

There are three types of resonant mass antenna that have been built: room-temperature bar antennas, cryogenically cooled bar antennas and cryogenically cooled spherical antennas.

The earliest type was the room-temperature bar-shaped antenna called a Weber bar; these were dominant in 1960s and 1970s and many were built around the world. It was claimed by Weber and some others in the late 1960s and early 1970s that these devices detected gravitational waves; however, other experimenters failed to detect gravitational waves using them, and a consensus developed that Weber bars would not be a practical means to detect gravitational waves.

The second generation of resonant mass antennas, developed in the 1980s and 1990s, were the cryogenic bar antennas which are also sometimes called Weber bars. In the 1990s there were five major cryogenic bar antennas: AURIGA (Padua, Italy), NAUTILUS (Rome, Italy), EXPLORER (CERN, Switzerland), ALLEGRO (Louisiana, US), and NIOBE (Perth, Australia). In 1997, these five antennas run by four research groups formed the International Gravitational Event Collaboration (IGEC) for collaboration. While there were several cases of unexplained deviations from the background signal, there were no confirmed instances of the observation of gravitational waves with these detectors.

In the 1980s, there was also a cryogenic bar antenna called ALTAIR, which, along with a room-temperature bar antenna called GEOGRAV, was built in Italy as a prototype for later bar antennas. Operators of the GEOGRAV-detector claimed to have observed gravitational waves coming from the supernova SN1987A (along with another room-temperature bar antenna), but these claims were not adopted by the wider community.

These modern cryogenic forms of the Weber bar operated with superconducting quantum interference devices to detect vibration (ALLEGRO, for example). Some of them continued in operation after the interferometric antennas started to reach astrophysical sensitivity, such as AURIGA, an ultracryogenic resonant cylindrical bar gravitational wave detector based at INFN in Italy. The AURIGA and LIGO teams collaborated in joint observations.

In the 2000s, the third generation of resonant mass antennas, the spherical cryogenic antennas, emerged. Four spherical antennas were proposed around year 2000 and two of them were built as downsized versions, the others were cancelled. The proposed antennas were GRAIL (Netherlands, downsized to MiniGRAIL), TIGA (US, small prototypes made), SFERA (Italy), and Graviton (Brasil, downsized to Mario Schenberg).

The two downsized antennas, MiniGRAIL and the Mario Schenberg, are similar in design and are operated as a collaborative effort. MiniGRAIL is based at Leiden University, and consists of an exactingly machined 1,150 kg (2,540 lb) sphere cryogenically cooled to 20 mK (−273.1300 °C; −459.6340 °F). The spherical configuration allows for equal sensitivity in all directions, and is somewhat experimentally simpler than larger linear devices requiring high vacuum. Events are detected by measuring deformation of the detector sphere. MiniGRAIL is highly sensitive in the 2–4 kHz range, suitable for detecting gravitational waves from rotating neutron star instabilities or small black hole mergers.

It is the current consensus that current cryogenic resonant mass detectors are not sensitive enough to detect anything but extremely powerful (and thus very rare) gravitational waves. As of 2020, no detection of gravitational waves by cryogenic resonant antennas has occurred.

== Laser interferometers ==
Simplified operation of a gravitational wave observatory Figure 1: A beamsplitter (green line) splits coherent light (from the white box) into two beams which reflect off the mirrors (cyan oblongs); only one outgoing and reflected beam in each arm is shown, and separated for clarity. The reflected beams recombine and an interference pattern is detected (purple circle). Figure 2: A gravitational wave passing over the left arm (yellow) changes its length and thus the interference pattern.

A more sensitive detector uses laser interferometry to measure gravitational-wave induced motion between separated 'free' masses. This allows the masses to be separated by large distances (increasing the signal size); a further advantage is that it is sensitive to a wide range of frequencies (not just those near a resonance as is the case for Weber bars). Ground-based interferometers are now operational.

Currently, the most sensitive ground-based laser interferometer is LIGO – the Laser Interferometer Gravitational Wave Observatory. LIGO is famous as the site of the first confirmed detections of gravitational waves in 2015. LIGO has two detectors: one in Livingston, Louisiana; the other at the Hanford site in Richland, Washington. Each consists of two light storage arms which are 4 km in length. These are at 90 degree angles to each other, with the light passing through 1 m (3 ft 3 in) diameter vacuum tubes running the entire 4 kilometres (2.5 mi). A passing gravitational wave will slightly stretch one arm as it shortens the other. This is precisely the motion to which a Michelson interferometer is most sensitive.

Even with such long arms, the strongest gravitational waves will only change the distance between the ends of the arms by at most roughly 10^{−18} meters. LIGO should be able to detect gravitational waves as small as $h \approx 5\times 10^{-22}$. Upgrades to LIGO and other detectors such as Virgo, GEO600, and TAMA 300 should increase the sensitivity further, and the next generation of instruments (Advanced LIGO Plus and Advanced Virgo Plus) will be more sensitive still. Another highly sensitive interferometer (KAGRA) began operations in 2020. A key point is that a ten-times increase in sensitivity (radius of "reach") increases the volume of space accessible to the instrument by one thousand. This increases the rate at which detectable signals should be seen from one per tens of years of observation, to tens per year.

Interferometric detectors are limited at high frequencies by shot noise, which occurs because the lasers produce photons randomly. One analogy is to rainfall: the rate of rainfall, like the laser intensity, is measurable, but the raindrops, like photons, fall at random times, causing fluctuations around the average value. This leads to noise at the output of the detector, much like radio static. In addition, for sufficiently high laser power, the random momentum transferred to the test masses by the laser photons shakes the mirrors, masking signals at low frequencies. Thermal noise (e.g., Brownian motion) is another limit to sensitivity. In addition to these "stationary" (constant) noise sources, all ground-based detectors are also limited at low frequencies by seismic noise and other forms of environmental vibration, and other "non-stationary" noise sources; creaks in mechanical structures, lightning or other large electrical disturbances, etc. may also create noise masking an event or may even imitate an event. All these must be taken into account and excluded by analysis before a detection may be considered a true gravitational-wave event.

Space-based interferometers, such as LISA and DECIGO, are also being developed. LISA's design calls for three test masses forming an equilateral triangle, with lasers from each spacecraft to each other spacecraft forming two independent interferometers. LISA is planned to occupy a solar orbit trailing the Earth, with each arm of the triangle being five million kilometers. This puts the detector in an excellent vacuum far from Earth-based sources of noise, though it will still be susceptible to shot noise, as well as artifacts caused by cosmic rays and solar wind.

=== Einstein@Home ===
In some sense, the easiest signals to detect should be constant sources. Supernovae and neutron star or black hole mergers should have larger amplitudes and be more interesting, but the waves generated will be more complicated. The waves given off by a spinning, bumpy neutron star would be "monochromatic" – like a pure tone in acoustics. It would not change very much in amplitude or frequency.

The Einstein@Home project is a distributed computing project similar to SETI@home intended to detect this type of simple gravitational wave. By taking data from LIGO and GEO, and sending it out in little pieces to thousands of volunteers for parallel analysis on their home computers, Einstein@Home can sift through the data far more quickly than would be possible otherwise.

== Pulsar timing arrays ==
A different approach to detecting gravitational waves is used by pulsar timing arrays, such as the European Pulsar Timing Array, the North American Nanohertz Observatory for Gravitational Waves, and the Parkes Pulsar Timing Array. These projects propose to detect gravitational waves by looking at the effect these waves have on the incoming signals from an array of 20–50 well-known millisecond pulsars. As a gravitational wave passing through the Earth contracts space in one direction and expands space in another, the times of arrival of pulsar signals from those directions are shifted correspondingly. By studying a fixed set of pulsars across the sky, these arrays should be able to detect gravitational waves in the nanohertz range. Such signals are expected to be emitted by pairs of merging supermassive black holes.

In June 2023, four pulsar timing array collaborations, the three mentioned above and the Chinese Pulsar Timing Array, presented independent but similar evidence for a stochastic background of nanohertz gravitational waves. The source of this background could not yet be identified.

== Cosmic microwave background ==
The cosmic microwave background, radiation left over from when the Universe cooled sufficiently for the first atoms to form, can contain the imprint of gravitational waves from the very early Universe. The microwave radiation is polarized. The pattern of polarization can be split into two classes called E-modes and B-modes. This is in analogy to electrostatics where the electric field (E-field) has a vanishing curl and the magnetic field (B-field) has a vanishing divergence. The E-modes can be created by a variety of processes, but the B-modes can only be produced by gravitational lensing, gravitational waves, or scattering from dust.

On 17 March 2014, astronomers at the Harvard-Smithsonian Center for Astrophysics announced the apparent detection of the imprint gravitational waves in the cosmic microwave background, which, if confirmed, would provide strong evidence for inflation and the Big Bang. However, on 19 June 2014, lowered confidence in confirming the findings was reported; and on 19 September 2014, even more lowered confidence. Finally, on 30 January 2015, the European Space Agency announced that the signal can be entirely attributed to dust in the Milky Way.

== Novel detector designs ==
Atomic interferometry.

There are currently two detectors focusing on detections at the higher end of the gravitational-wave spectrum (10^{−7} to 10^{5} Hz): one at University of Birmingham, England, and the other at INFN Genoa, Italy. A third is under development at Chongqing University, China. The Birmingham detector measures changes in the polarization state of a microwave beam circulating in a closed loop about one meter across. Two have been fabricated and they are currently expected to be sensitive to periodic spacetime strains of $h\sim{2 \times 10^{-13}/\sqrt{\mathit{Hz}}}$, given as an amplitude spectral density. The INFN Genoa detector is a resonant antenna consisting of two coupled spherical superconducting harmonic oscillators a few centimeters in diameter. The oscillators are designed to have (when uncoupled) almost equal resonant frequencies. The system is currently expected to have a sensitivity to periodic spacetime strains of $h\sim{2 \times 10^{-17}/\sqrt{\mathit{Hz}}}$, with an expectation to reach a sensitivity of $h\sim{2 \times 10^{-20}/\sqrt{\mathit{Hz}}}$. The Chongqing University detector is planned to detect relic high-frequency gravitational waves with the predicted typical parameters ~ 10^{10} Hz (10 GHz) and h ~ 10^{−30} to 10^{−31}.

Levitated Sensor Detector is a proposed detector for gravitational waves with a frequency between 10 kHz and 300 kHz, potentially coming from primordial black holes. It will use optically-levitated dielectric particles in an optical cavity.

A torsion-bar antenna (TOBA) is a proposed design composed of two, long, thin bars, suspended as torsion pendula in a cross-like fashion, in which the differential angle is sensitive to tidal gravitational wave forces.

Detectors based on matter waves (atom interferometers) have also been proposed and are being developed. There have been proposals since the beginning of the 2000s. Atom interferometry is proposed to extend the detection bandwidth in the infrasound band (10 mHz – 10 Hz), where current ground based detectors are limited by low frequency gravity noise. A demonstrator project called Matter wave laser based Interferometer Gravitation Antenna (MIGA) started construction in 2018 in the underground environment of LSBB (Rustrel, France).

== List of gravitational wave detectors ==
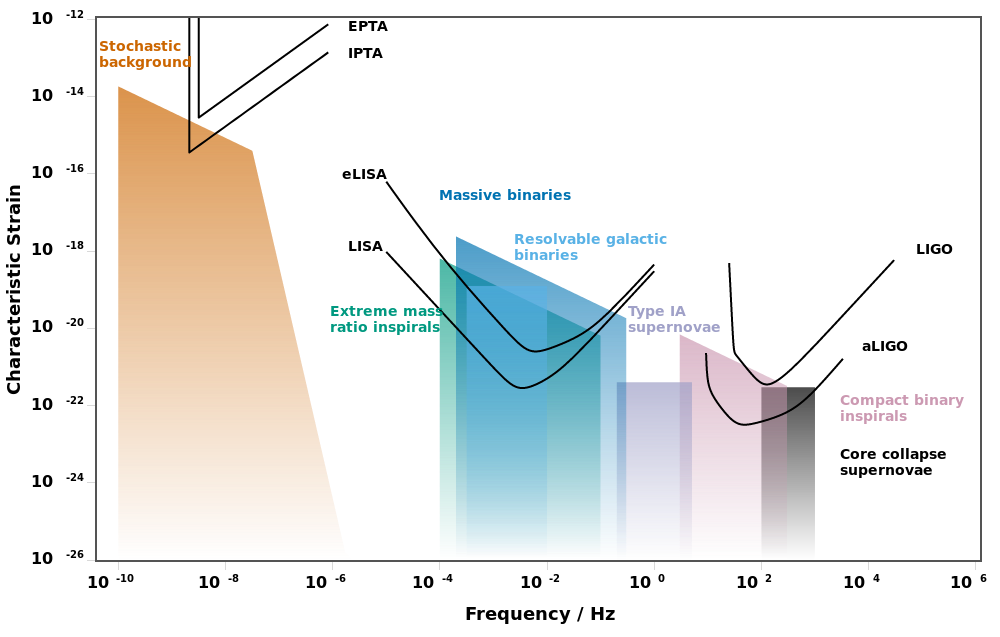
Noise curves for a selection of detectors as a function of frequency. The characteristic strain of potential astrophysical sources are also shown. To be detectable the characteristic strain of a signal must be above the noise curve.

=== Resonant mass detectors ===
- First generation
  - Weber bar (1960s–80s)
- Second generation
  - EXPLORER (CERN, 1985–)
  - GEOGRAV (Rome, 1980s–)
  - ALTAIR (Frascati, 1990–)
  - ALLEGRO (Baton Rouge, 1991–2008)
  - NIOBE (Perth, 1993–)
  - NAUTILUS (Rome, 1995–)
  - AURIGA (Padova, 1997–)
- Third generation
  - Mario Schenberg (São Paulo, 2003–)
  - MiniGrail (Leiden, 2003–)

=== Interferometers ===
Interferometric gravitational-wave detectors are often grouped into generations based on the technology used. The interferometric detectors deployed in the 1990s and 2000s were proving grounds for many of the foundational technologies necessary for initial detection and are commonly referred to as the first generation. The second generation of detectors operating in the 2010s, mostly at the same facilities like LIGO and Virgo, improved on these designs with sophisticated techniques such as cryogenic mirrors and the injection of squeezed vacuum. This led to the first unambiguous detection of a gravitational wave by Advanced LIGO in 2015. The third generation of detectors are currently in the planning phase, and seek to improve over the second generation by achieving greater detection sensitivity and a larger range of accessible frequencies. All these experiments involve many technologies under continuous development over multiple decades, so the categorization by generation is necessarily only rough.

- First generation
  - (1995) TAMA 300
  - (1995) GEO600
  - (2002) LIGO
  - (2006) CLIO
  - (2007) Virgo interferometer
- Second generation
  - (2010) GEO High Frequency
  - (2015) Advanced LIGO
  - (2016) Advanced Virgo
  - (2020) KAGRA (LCGT)
  - (2030) IndIGO (LIGO-India)
  - (2030s) Neutron star Extreme Matter Observatory (NEMO)
- Third generation
  - (2030s) Einstein Telescope
  - (2030s) Cosmic Explorer
- Space based
  - (2033?) Taiji (gravitational wave observatory)
  - (2035) Laser Interferometer Space Antenna (LISA, its technology demonstrator LISA Pathfinder was launched December 2015)
  - (mid-2030s?) TianQin
  - (2030s?) Deci-hertz Interferometer Gravitational wave Observatory (DECIGO)

=== Pulsar timing ===
- (2005) Parkes Pulsar Timing Array
- (2009) European Pulsar Timing Array
- (2010) North American Nanohertz Observatory for Gravitational Waves (NANOGrav)
- (2016) International Pulsar Timing Array, a joint project combining the Parkes, European and NANOGrav arrays above
- (2016) Indian Pulsar Timing Array Experiment (InPTA)
- (?) Chinese Pulsar Timing Array (CPTA)
- (?) MeerKAT Pulsar Timing Array (MeerTime)

== See also ==
- Detection theory
- Gravitational-wave astronomy
- Matched filter
