= Douglas Mountain =

Douglas Mountain may refer to:

- Douglas Mountain (Maine)
- Douglas Mountain (Washington)
- Douglas Mountain, written by Alexander Wilder and Arnold Sundgaard in 1965
