= Mario Schenberg (Gravitational Wave Detector) =

Gravitational wave detector

- Alternative names: Brazilian Graviton Project
- Location: São Paulo, Brazil

The Mario Schenberg (Gravitational Wave Detector, Brazilian Graviton Project, or Graviton) is a spherical, resonant-mass, gravitational wave detector formerly run by the Physics Institute of the University of São Paulo, named after Mário Schenberg. Similar to the Dutch-run MiniGrail, the 1.15 ton, 65 cm diameter spherical test mass is suspended in a cryogenic vacuum enclosure, kept at 20 mK and is sensitive to signals with frequencies between 3,150 Hz and 3,260 Hz; and the sensors (transducers) for this detector/antenna are developed at the National Institute for Space Research (INPE), in Sao José dos Campos, Brazil. As of 2016, the antenna has not detected any gravitational waves, and development of the antenna continues. It has been decided that the antenna will be transferred from the University of São Paulo to INPE. As of late 2023, the detector remained disassembled.

== See also ==
- List of radio telescopes
