= David F. Douglass =

American politician

David F. Douglass

David F. Douglass was an American politician who served in the California legislature and as Secretary of State. During the Mexican–American War he served in the US Army.

Political offices
Preceded by Charles H. Hempstead	Secretary of State of California; 1856–1858	Succeeded by Ferris Foreman
