= Virgo interferometer =

Gravitational-wave detector in Italy

Virgo
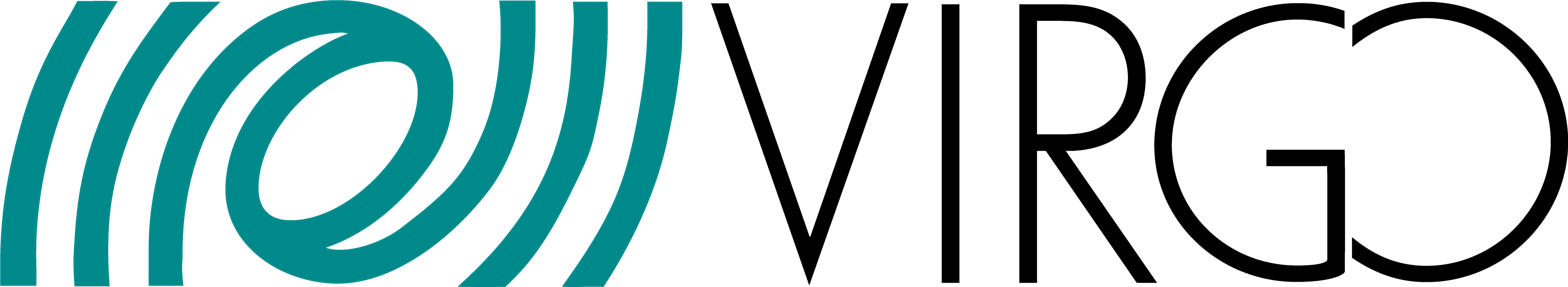

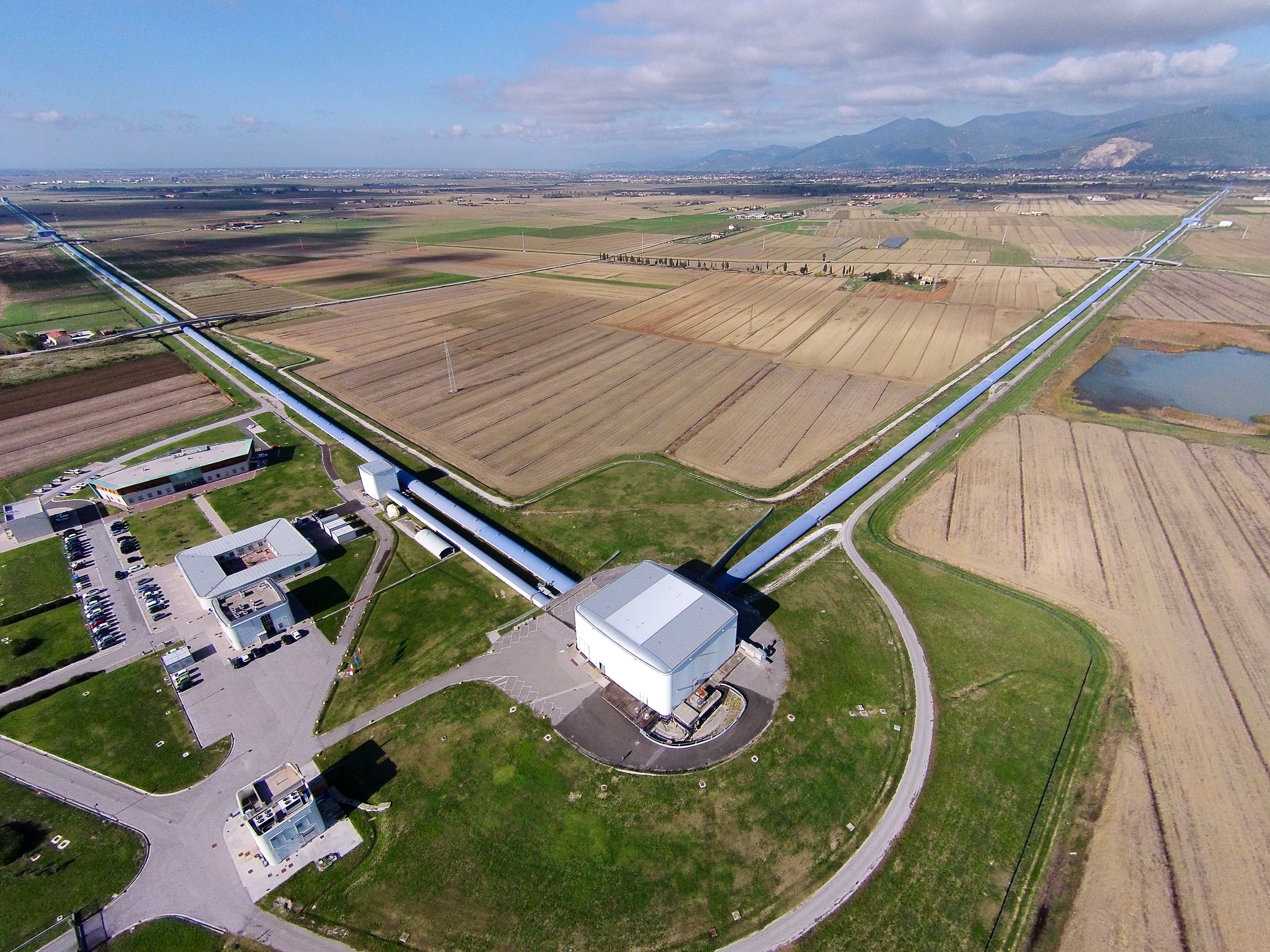
- Aerial view of Virgo

- Location within Italy
- Formation: 1993
- Type: International scientific collaboration
- Headquarters: European Gravitational Observatory
- Location: Santo Stefano a Macerata, Cascina, Italy
- Coordinates: 43.6313°N 10.5045°E
- Owner: European Gravitational Observatory
- Spokesperson: Marie-Anne Bizouard
- Affiliations: LVK (LIGO-Virgo-KAGRA collaboration)
- Budget: 11.5 million euros in 2023
- Staff: Around 940 people participate in the Virgo Collaboration
- Website: www.virgo-gw.eu

The Virgo interferometer is a large-scale scientific instrument near Pisa, Italy, for detecting gravitational waves. The detector is a Michelson interferometer, which can detect the minuscule length variations in its two 3 km (1.9 mi) arms induced by the passage of gravitational waves. The required precision is achieved using many systems to isolate it from the outside world, including keeping its mirrors and instrumentation in an ultra-high vacuum and suspending them using complex systems of pendula.

Between its periodic observations, the detector is upgraded to increase its sensitivity. The observation runs are performed in collaboration with other similar detectors, including the two Laser Interferometer Gravitational-Wave Observatories (LIGO) in the United States and the Japanese Kamioka Gravitational Wave Detector (KAGRA), because cooperation between several detectors is crucial for detecting gravitational waves and pinpointing their origin.

Virgo was conceived and built when gravitational waves were only a prediction of general relativity. The project, named after the Virgo galaxy cluster, was approved in 1992 and construction was completed in 2003. After several years without detection, Virgo was shut down in 2011 for the "Advanced Virgo" upgrades. In 2015, the first observation of gravitational waves was made by the two LIGO detectors, while Virgo was still being upgraded. Virgo resumed observations in early August 2017, making its first detection on 14 August (together with the LIGO detectors); this was quickly followed by the detection of the GW170817 gravitational wave, the only one also observed with classical methods (optical, gamma-ray, X-ray and radio telescopes) as of 2024.

Virgo is hosted by the European Gravitational Observatory (EGO), a consortium founded by the French Centre National de la Recherche Scientifique (CNRS) and the Italian Istituto Nazionale di Fisica Nucleare (INFN). The broader Virgo Collaboration, gathering 940 members in 20 countries, operates the detector, and defines the strategy and policy for its use and upgrades. The LIGO and Virgo collaborations have shared their data since 2007, and with KAGRA since 2019, forming the LIGO-Virgo-KAGRA (LVK) collaboration.

European country with institutions contributing to EGO and the Virgo Collaboration European country with institutions contributing to the Virgo Collaboration

== Organisation ==
The Virgo interferometer is managed by the European Gravitational Observatory (EGO) consortium, which was created in December 2000 by the French National Centre for Scientific Research (CNRS) and the Istituto Nazionale di Fisica Nucleare (INFN). Nikhef, the Dutch Institute for Nuclear and High-Energy Physics, later joined as an observer and eventually became a full member in 2021. Institutions from Poland, Spain and Belgium joined EGO as observers in 2023, with the Belgian FWO and FNRS joining as full members in 2025. EGO is responsible for the Virgo site and ensures the detector's commissioning, maintenance, operation and upgrades. By metonymy, the site itself is sometimes referred to as EGO, as the consortium is headquartered there. One of EGO's goals is to promote research on gravity in Europe. Between 2018 and 2024, the budget of EGO fluctuates between 9 and 11.5 million euros per year, employing around 60 people.

The Virgo Collaboration consists of all the researchers working on various aspects of the detector. About 940 members, representing 165 institutions in 20 countries, were part of the Collaboration as of December 2024. This includes institutions in France, Italy, the Netherlands, Poland, Spain, Belgium, Germany, Hungary, Portugal, Greece, Czechia, Denmark, Ireland, Monaco, Switzerland, Brazil, Burkina Faso, China, Israel, Japan and South Korea.

The Virgo Collaboration is part of the larger LIGO-Virgo-KAGRA (LVK) Collaboration, which gathers scientists from the other major gravitational-waves experiments to jointly analyse the data; this is crucial for gravitational-wave detection. LVK began in 2007 as the LIGO-Virgo Collaboration, and was expanded when KAGRA joined in 2019.

== Science case ==
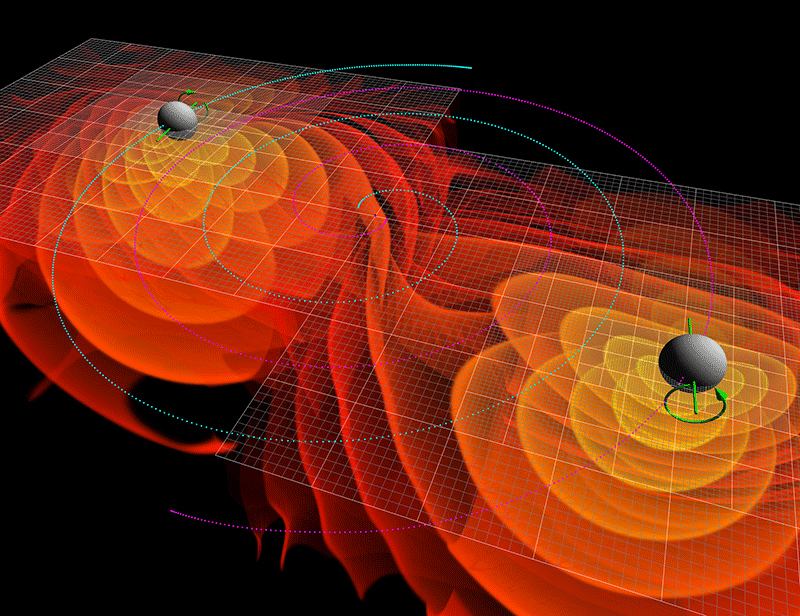
Computer simulation of gravitational waves emitted by the orbital decay and merger of two black holes

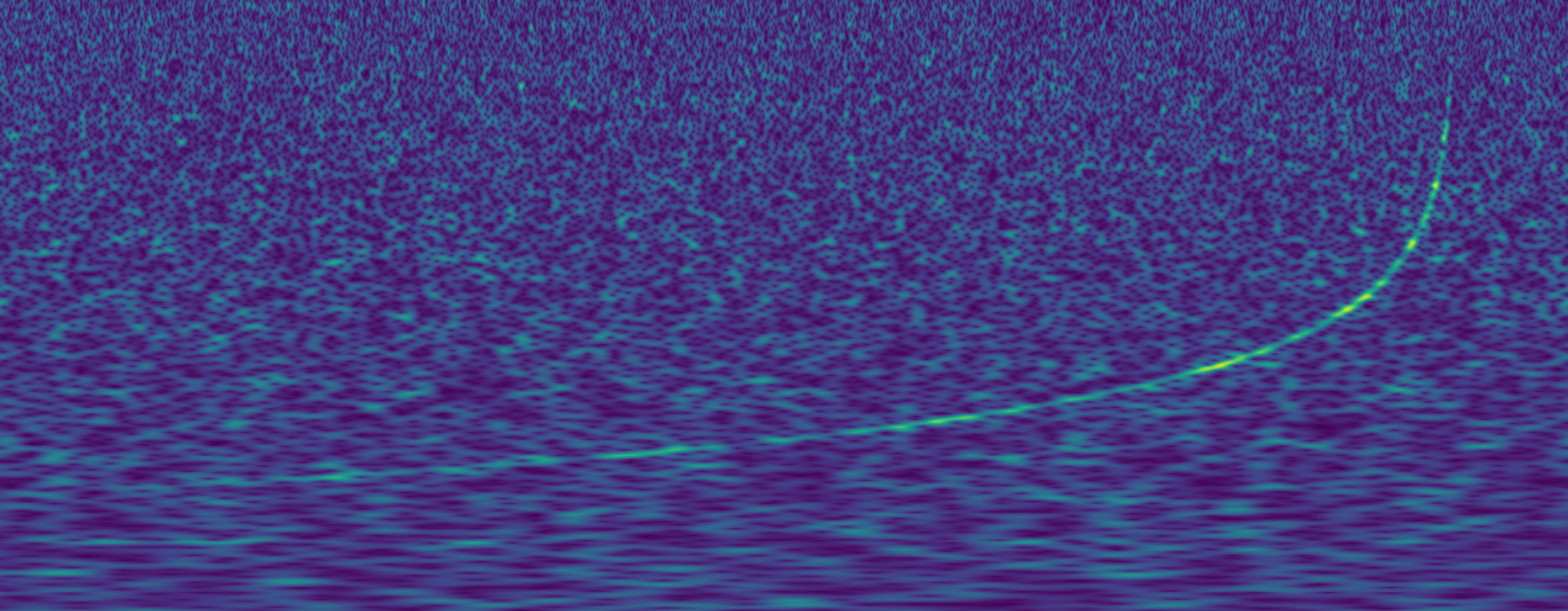
Typical "chirp" of a gravitational-wave signal from the GW170817 event. The x axis represents time, and the y axis the frequency. The frequency increase over time is typical of gravitational waves from binary compact objects, and its shape is primarily determined by the objects' mass.

Virgo is designed to look for gravitational waves emitted by astrophysical sources across the universe which can be classified into three types:

- Transient sources, which are objects only detectable for a short period. The main sources in this category are compact binary coalescences (CBC) from binary black holes (or neutron stars) merging, emitting a rapidly-growing signal which only becomes detectable in the last seconds before the merger. Other possible sources of short-lived gravitational waves are supernovas, instabilities in compact astrophysical objects, or exotic sources such as cosmic strings.
- Continuous sources, emitting a signal observable on a long time scale. Prime candidates are rapidly-spinning neutron stars (pulsars), which may emit gravitational waves if they are not perfectly spherical (e.g. if there are tiny "mountains" on the surface).
- Stochastic backgrounds, a type of generally-continuous signal diffused across large regions of the sky rather than from a single source. It could consist of a large number of indistinguishable sources from the above categories, or originate from the early moments of the universe.

Detection of gravitational waves from these sources is a new way to observe them (often with different information than classical methods such as telescopes) and to probe fundamental properties of gravity such as the polarisation of gravitational waves, possible gravitational lensing, or determining whether the observed signals are correctly described by general relativity. It also provides a way to measure the Hubble constant.

== History ==
The Virgo project was approved in 1992 by the French CNRS and the following year by the Italian INFN. Construction of the detector began in 1996 in Santo Stefano a Macerata in Cascina, near Pisa, Italy, and was completed in 2003. After several observation runs in which no gravitational waves were detected, the interferometer was shut down in 2011 for upgrading as part of the Advanced Virgo project. It began observations again in 2017, and made its first two detections soon after, together with the LIGO detectors.

=== Conception ===
Although the concept of gravitational waves was presented by Albert Einstein in 1916, serious projects for detecting them only began during the late 1960s. The first were the Weber bars, invented by Joseph Weber; although they could detect gravitational waves in theory, none of the experiments succeeded. However, they sparked the creation of research groups dedicated to gravitational waves.

The idea of a large interferometric detector began to gain credibility during the early 1980s, and the Virgo project was conceptualised by Italian researcher Adalberto Giazotto and French researcher Alain Brillet in 1985 after they met in Rome. A key idea that set Virgo apart from other projects was the targeting of low frequencies (around 10 Hz); most projects focused on higher frequencies (around 500 Hz). Many believed at the time that low-frequency observations were not possible; only France and Italy began work on the project, which was first proposed in 1987. The name Virgo was coined shortly after, in reference to the Virgo galaxy cluster; it symbolizes the aim of the project to detect gravitational waves originating from beyond our galaxy. After approval by the CNRS and the INFN, construction of the interferometer began in 1996 with the aim of beginning observations by 2000.

Virgo's first goal was to directly observe gravitational waves, whose existence was already indirectly evidenced by the three-decade study of the binary pulsar 1913+16: the observed decrease of this binary pulsar's orbital period was in agreement with the hypothesis that the system was losing energy by emitting gravitational waves.

=== Initial Virgo detector ===
The Virgo detector was first built, commissioned and operated during the 2000s, and reached its expected sensitivity. This validated its design choices, and demonstrated that giant interferometers were promising devices for detecting gravitational waves in a broad frequency band. This phase is sometimes called the "initial Virgo" or "original Virgo".

Construction of the initial Virgo detector was completed in June 2003, and several data collection periods ("science runs") followed between 2007 and 2011, after 4 years of commissioning. Some of the runs were performed with the two LIGO detectors (which are located in Hanford, Washington and in Livingston, Louisiana). There was a shut-down of a few months in 2010 for an upgrade of the Virgo suspension system, and the original steel suspension wires were replaced by glass fibres to reduce thermal noise. Even after several months of data collection with the upgraded suspension system, no gravitational waves were observed, and the detector was shut down in September 2011 for the installation of Advanced Virgo.

=== Advanced Virgo detector ===
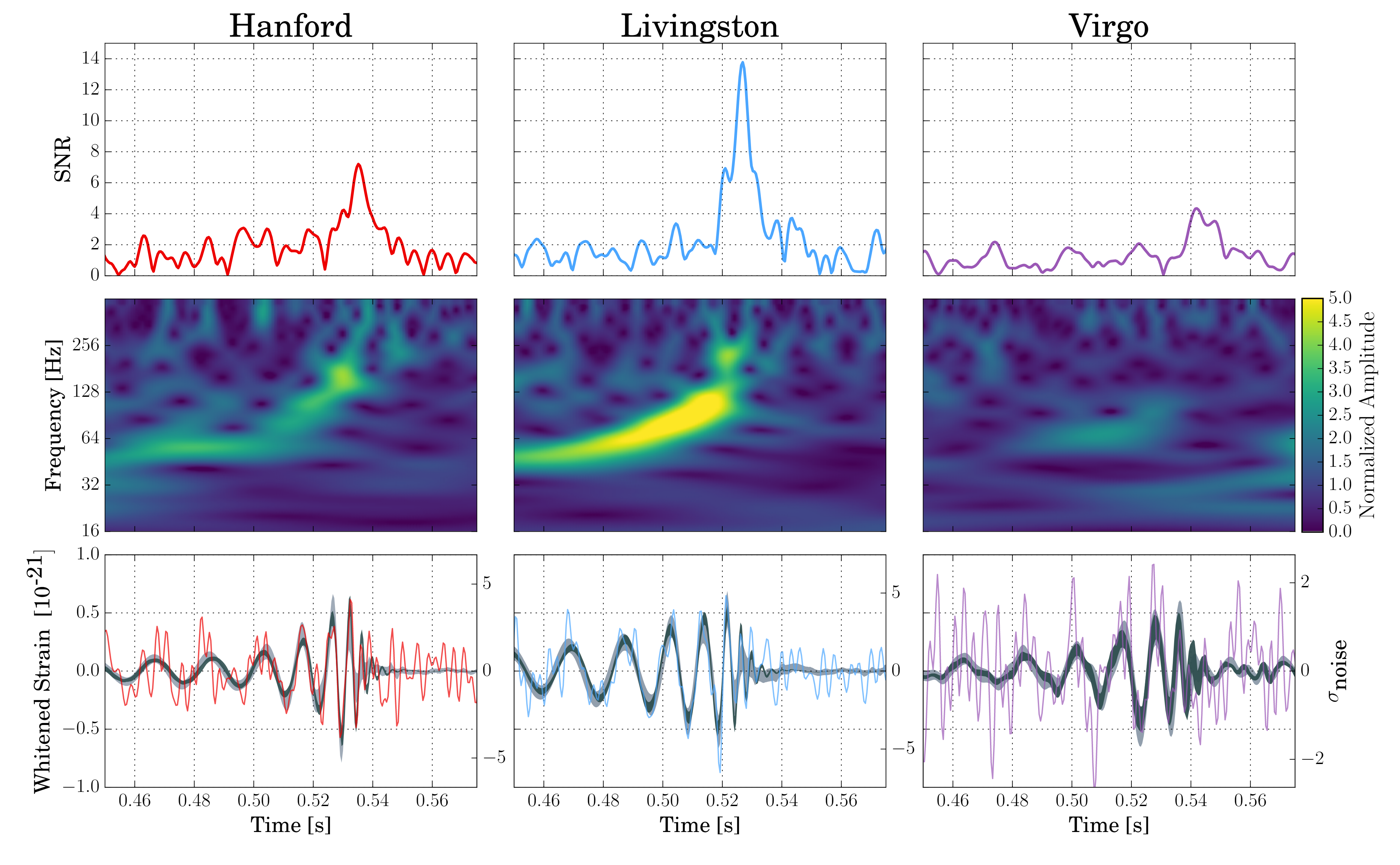
First direct detection of a gravitational wave by Virgo on 14 August 2017 (GW170814)

The Advanced Virgo detector aimed to increase the sensitivity (and the distance from which a signal can be detected) by a factor of 10, allowing it to probe a volume of the universe 1,000 times larger and making detection of gravitational waves more likely. It benefited from the experience gained with the initial detector and technological advances.

The Advanced Virgo detector kept the same vacuum infrastructure as the initial Virgo, but the rest of the interferometer was upgraded. Four additional cryotraps were added at both ends of each arm to trap residual particles coming from the mirror towers. The new mirrors were larger, with a diameter of 35 cm (14 in) and a weight of 40 kg (88 lb), and their optical performance was improved. The optical elements used to control the interferometer were under vacuum on suspended mountings. A system of adaptive optics was installed to correct the mirror aberrations in situ. In the original plan, the laser power was expected to reach 200 W in its final configuration.

Advanced Virgo began the commissioning process in 2016, joining the two LIGO detectors (which had gone through similar upgrades with Advanced LIGO, and made their first detection in 2015) on 1 August 2017. Observation "runs" for the Advanced detector era are planned by the LVK collaboration with the goal to maximise the observing time with several detectors, and are labelled O1 to O5; Virgo began participating in these near the end of the O2 run. LIGO and Virgo detected the GW170814 signal on 14 August 2017, which was reported on 27 September of that year. It was the first binary black hole merger detected by both LIGO and Virgo, and the first for Virgo.

GW170817 was detected by LIGO and Virgo on 17 August 2017. The signal, produced by the final minutes of two neutron stars spiralling closer to each other and merging, was the first binary neutron-star merger observed and the first gravitational-wave observation confirmed by non-gravitational means. The resulting gamma-ray burst was also detected, and optical telescopes later discovered a kilonova corresponding to the merger.

LIGO
Virgo
KAGRA

Timeline of the gravitational wave observation periods from the LIGO, Virgo and KAGRA detectors

After further upgrades, Virgo began its third observation run (O3) in April 2019. Planned to last one year, the run ended early on 27 March 2020 due to the COVID-19 pandemic.

The upgrades following O3 are part of the Advanced Virgo+ program, divided into two phases; the first preceded the O4 run, and the second precedes the O5 run. The first phase focused on the reduction of quantum noise by introducing a more powerful laser, improving the squeezing introduced in O3, and implementing a new technique known as signal recycling; seismic sensors were also installed around the mirrors. The second phase will attempt to reduce the mirror thermal noise by changing the geometry of the laser beam to increase its size on the mirrors (spreading the energy on a larger area and thus reducing the temperature) and improving the coating of the mirrors; the end mirrors will be larger, requiring improvements to the suspension. Further improvements for quantum noise reduction are also expected in the second phase, building on the changes in the first.

The fourth observation run (O4) was scheduled to begin in May 2023 and was planned to last for 20 months, including a commissioning break of up to two months. On 11 May 2023, Virgo announced that it would not join the beginning of O4; the interferometer was not stable enough to reach the expected sensitivity and one mirror needed replacement, requiring several weeks of work. Virgo did not join the O4 run during its first part (O4a, which ended on 16 January 2024), since it only reached a peak sensitivity of 45 Mpc instead of the 80 to 115 Mpc initially expected; it joined the second part of the run (O4b), which began on 10 April 2024, with a sensitivity of 50 to 55 Mpc. The O4 run was extended several times, up until 18 November 2025, to better accommodate the development of the O5 upgrades, and to allow observations overlapping with the first operations of the Vera Rubin Observatory. These extensions to the run are designated as O4c (which officially started on 28 January 2025 and includes a two-month break in April and May). As of October 2026, a 6-month run called IR1 is planned for January 2027, with Virgo planning to participate.

=== Future ===
The detector was shut down for upgrades, including mirror-coating improvement, after the O4 run. A fifth observing run (O5) was planned to begin near the end of 2027, but is currently being reviewed. Virgo's target sensitivity, originally set at 150–260 Mpc, is being redefined in light of its performance during O4.

No official plans have been announced for the future of the Virgo installations after the O5 period, although projects for improving the detectors have been suggested. The collaboration's current plans are known as the Virgo_nEXT project.

== Instrument ==
=== Principle ===
Animation of gravitational-wave detection with an interferometer such as Virgo. Mirror displacements and phase difference are exaggerated, and time is slowed by more than a factor of 10.

In general relativity, a gravitational wave is a space-time perturbation which propagates at the speed of light. It slightly curves spacetime, changing the light path. This can be detected with a Michelson interferometer, in which a laser is divided into two beams travelling in orthogonal directions, bouncing on a mirror at the end of each arm. As the gravitational wave passes, it alters the path of the two beams differently; they are then recombined, and the resulting interferometric pattern is measured with a photodiode. Since the induced deformation is extremely small, precision in mirror position, laser stability, measurements, and isolation from outside noise are essential.

=== Laser and injection system ===
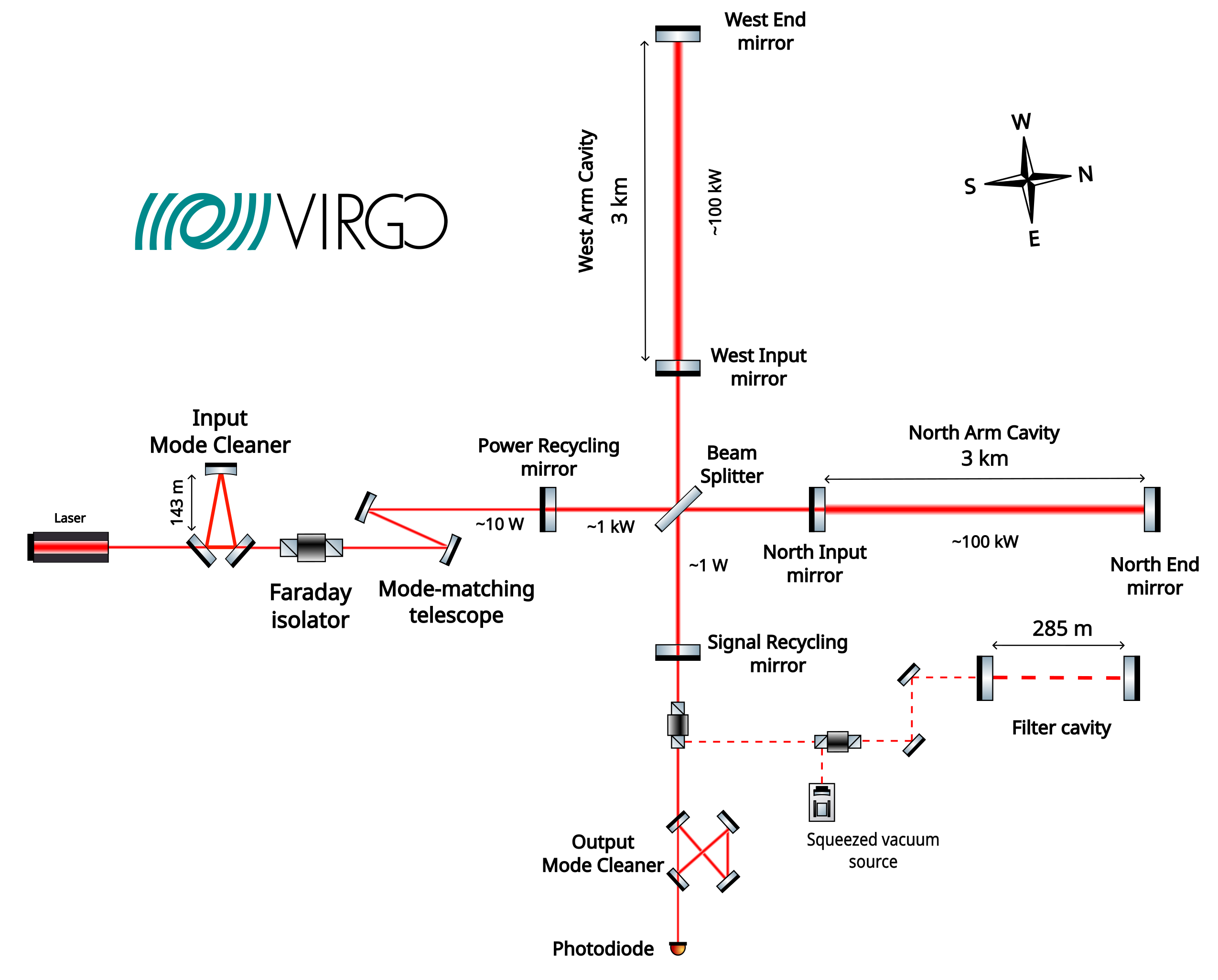
Layout of the Virgo interferometer during the O4 run (2023–2024), including the signal-recycling mirror and filter cavity absent from the previous run. Laser power estimates are indicative.

The laser, the instrument's light source, must be powerful and stable in frequency and amplitude. To meet these specifications, the beam starts from a low-power, stable laser. Light from the laser passes through several amplifiers, which enhance its power by a factor of 100. A 50 watt (W) output power was achieved for the last configuration of the initial Virgo detector (reaching 100 W during the O3 run after the Advanced Virgo upgrades), and is expected to be upgraded to 130 W at the beginning of the O4 run. The original Virgo detector had a master-slave laser system, where a "master" laser is used to stabilise a high-powered "slave" laser; the master laser was a Nd:YAG laser, and the slave laser was a Nd:YVO4 laser. The Advanced Virgo design uses a fibre laser, with an amplification stage also made of fibres, to improve the system's robustness; its final configuration is planned to combine the light of two lasers to reach the required power. The laser's wavelength is 1064 nanometres in the original and Advanced Virgo configurations.

This laser beam is sent into the interferometer after passing through the injection system, which ensures its stability, adjusts its shape and power, and positions it correctly for entering the interferometer. The injection system includes the input mode cleaner, which is a 140-metre-long (460 ft) cavity designed to improve beam quality by stabilising the frequency, removing unwanted light propagation and reducing the effect of laser misalignment. It also features a Faraday isolator preventing light from returning to the laser, and a mode-matching telescope which adapts the size and position of the beam before it enters the interferometer.

=== Mirrors ===
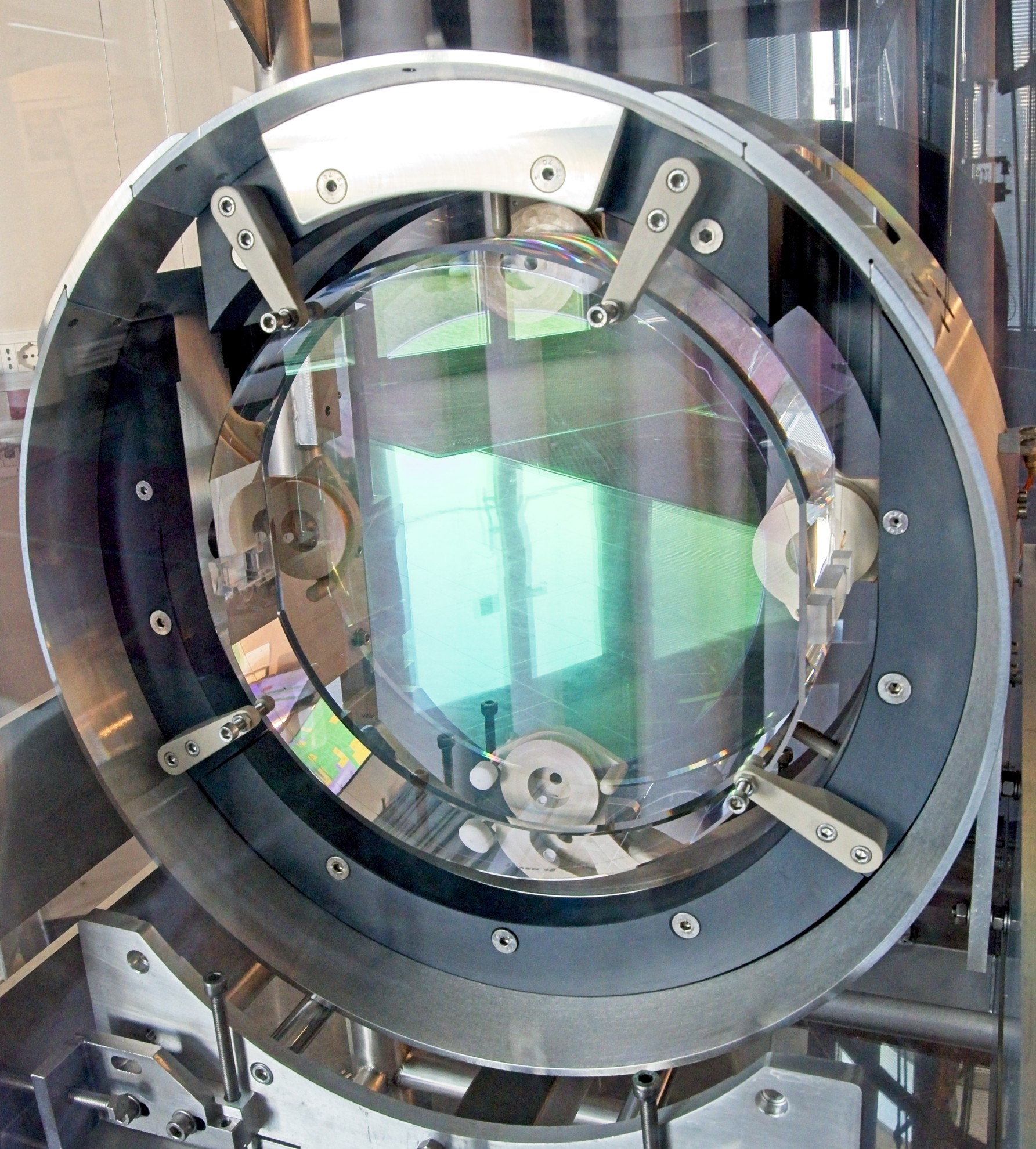
Mirror from the initial Virgo detector, now an exposition model at the Virgo site

The large mirrors in each arm are the interferometer's most critical optics. They include the two end mirrors at the ends of the 3 km (1.9 mi) interferometer arms and the two input mirrors near the beginning of the arms. These mirrors make a resonant optical cavity in each arm in which the light bounces thousands of times before returning to the beam splitter, maximising the signal's effect on the laser path and allowing the power of the light circulating in the arms to be increased. These mirrors (designed for Virgo) are cylinders 35 cm (14 in) in diameter and 20 cm (7.9 in) thick, made from extremely pure glass. During the manufacturing process, the mirrors are polished to the atomic level to avoid diffusing (and losing) any light. A reflective coating (a Bragg reflector made with ion-beam sputtering) is then added. The mirrors at the end of the arms reflect almost all incoming light, with less than 0.002 per cent lost at each reflection.

Two other mirrors are also in the final design:

- The power-recycling mirror, between the laser and the beam splitter. Since most light is reflected toward the laser after returning to the beam splitter, this mirror re-injects the light into the main interferometer and increases power in the arms.
- The signal-recycling mirror, at the interferometer output, re-injects part of the signal into the interferometer (transmission of this mirror is planned to be 40 per cent) and forms another cavity. With small adjustments to this mirror, quantum noise can be reduced in part of the frequency band and increased elsewhere; this makes it possible to tune the interferometer for certain frequencies. It is planned to use a wideband configuration, decreasing noise at high and low frequencies and increasing it at intermediate frequencies. Decreased noise at high frequencies is of particular interest for study of a signal right before and after a compact object merger.

=== Superattenuators ===
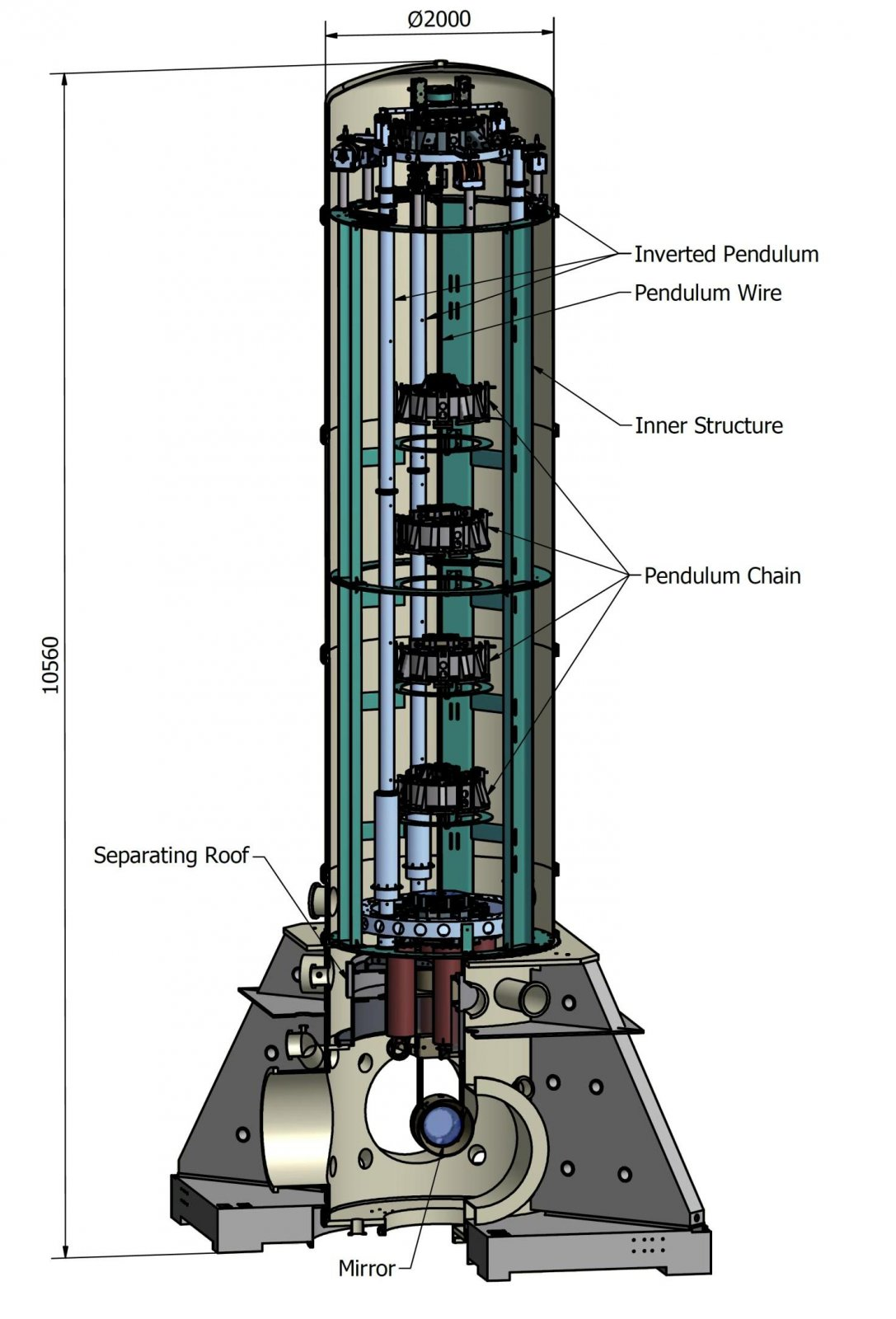
A Virgo mirror is supported in a vacuum by a superattenuator, which dampens seismic vibrations. It is a chain of pendula hanging from an upper platform and supported by three legs clamped to ground, forming an inverted pendulum. Seismic vibrations above 10 Hz are reduced by over 10^{12} times, and the mirror position is controlled.

To mitigate seismic noise which could propagate up to the mirrors, shaking them and obscuring potential gravitational-wave signals, the mirrors are suspended by a complex system. The main mirrors are suspended by four thin fibres made of silica which are attached to a series of attenuators. This superattenuator, nearly 8 metres (26 ft) high, is in a vacuum. The superattenuators limit disturbances to the mirrors and allow mirror position and orientation to be precisely steered. The optical table with the injection optics used to shape the laser beam, such as the optical benches used for the light detection, are also suspended in a vacuum to limit seismic and acoustic noise. In the Advanced Virgo configuration, the instrumentation used to detect gravitational-wave signals and steer the interferometer (photodiodes, cameras, and associated electronics) is installed on several benches suspended in a vacuum.

Superattenuator design is based on passive attenuation of seismic noise achieved by chaining several pendula, each a harmonic oscillator. They have a resonant frequency (diminishing with pendulum length) above which noise will be dampened; chaining several pendula reduces noise by twelve orders of magnitude, introducing resonant frequencies which are higher than a single long pendulum. The highest resonant frequency is around 2 Hz, providing meaningful noise reduction starting at 4 Hz and reaching the level needed to detect gravitational waves around 10 Hz. The system is limited in that noise in the resonant-frequency band (below 2 Hz) is not filtered and can generate large oscillations; this is mitigated by an active damping system, including sensors measuring seismic noise and actuators controlling the superattenuator to counteract the noise.

=== Detection system ===
Part of the light in the arm cavities is sent towards the detection system by the beam splitter. The interferometer works near the "dark fringe", with very little light sent towards the output; most is sent back to the input, to be collected by the power-recycling mirror. A fraction of this light is reflected back by the signal-recycling mirror, and the rest is collected by the detection system. It first passes through the output mode cleaner, which filters the "high-order modes" (light propagating in an unwanted way, typically from small defects in the mirrors) before reaching the photodiodes which measure the light intensity. The output mode cleaner and the photodiodes are suspended in a vacuum.

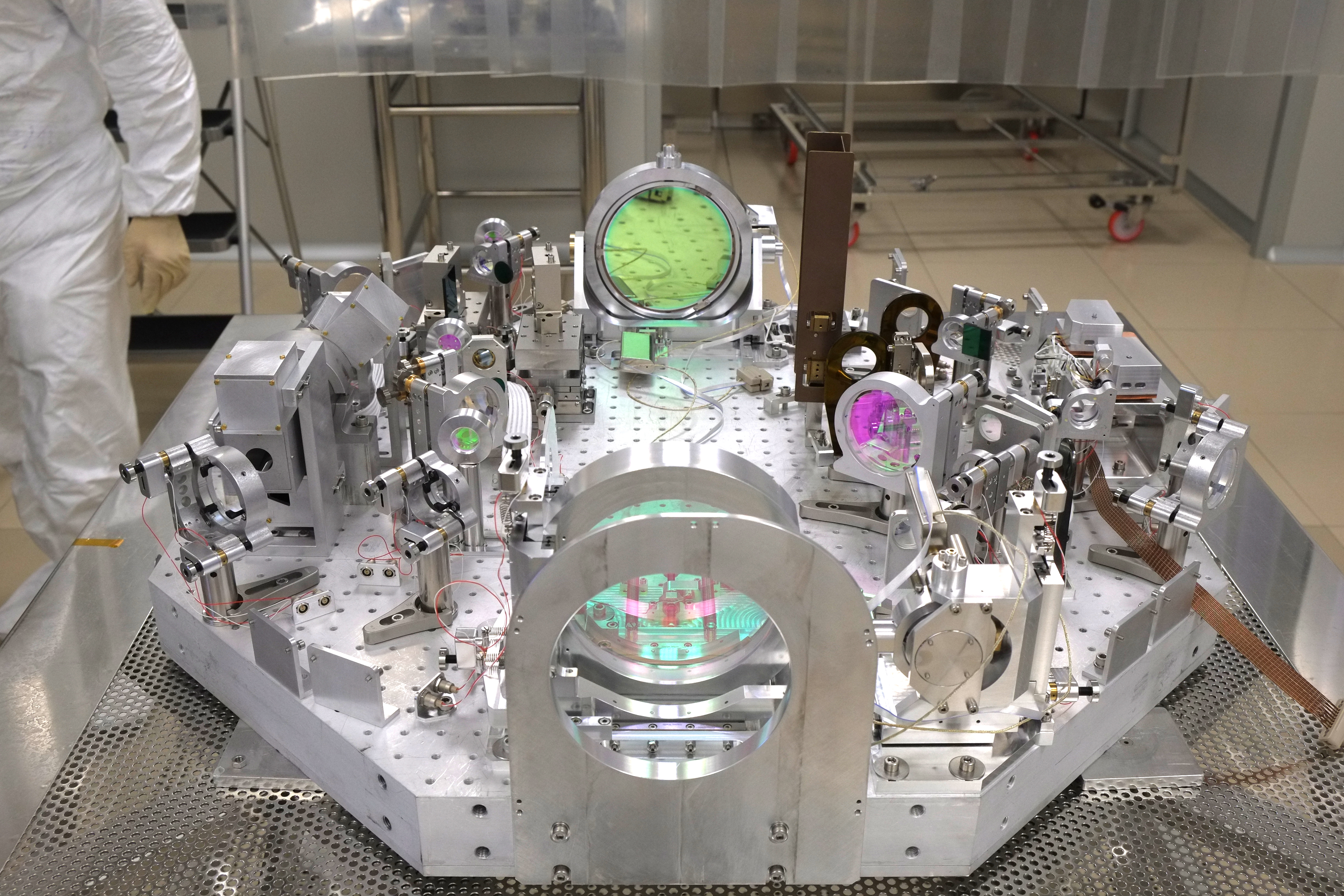
Detection bench of the Virgo interferometer before its April 2015 installation. It is 88 cm wide and hosts the output mode cleaner; the photodiode is on another bench.

With the O3 run, a squeezed vacuum source was introduced to reduce the quantum noise which is one of the main limitations to sensitivity. When replacing the standard vacuum with a squeezed vacuum, the fluctuations of a quantity are decreased at the expense of increasing the fluctuations of the other quantity due to Heisenberg's uncertainty principle. In Virgo, the quantities are the amplitude and phase of the light. A squeezed vacuum was proposed in 1981 by Carlton Caves during the infancy of gravitational-wave detectors. During the O3 run, frequency-independent squeezing was implemented; squeezing is identical at all frequencies, reducing shot noise (dominant at high frequencies) and increasing radiation pressure noise (dominant at low frequencies, and not limiting the instrument's sensitivity). Due to the addition of the squeezed vacuum injection, quantum noise was reduced by 3.2 dB at high frequencies and the detector's range was increased by five to eight per cent. More sophisticated squeezed states are produced by combining the technology from O3 with a new 285-m-long (935 ft) filter cavity. This technology, known as frequency-dependent squeezing, helps to reduce shot noise at high frequencies (where radiation pressure noise is irrelevant) and reduce radiation-pressure noise at low frequencies (where shot noise is low).

=== Infrastructure ===
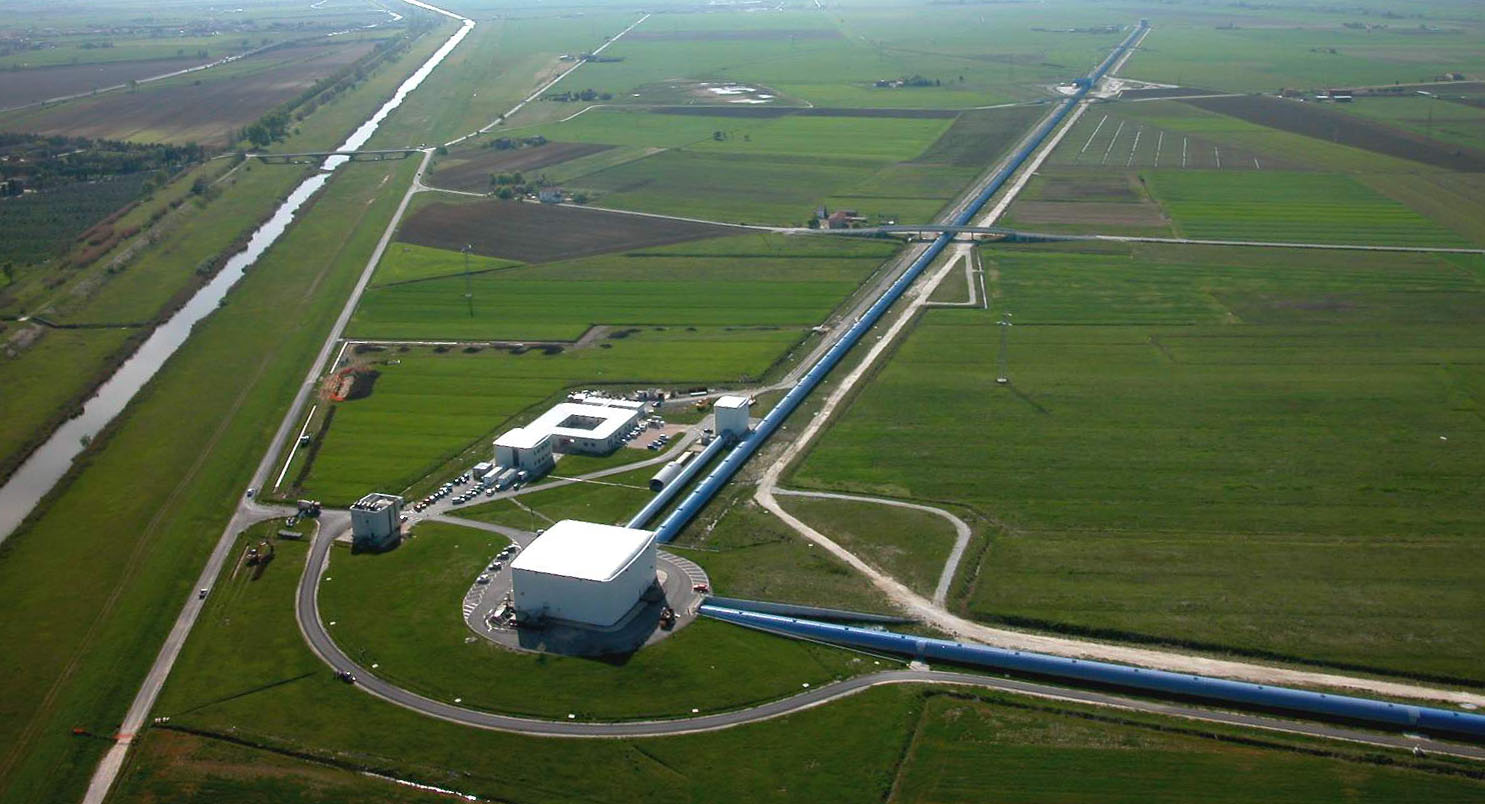
2015 aerial view of the Virgo site, showing the west arm (top) and part of the north arm (right), along with the various buildings

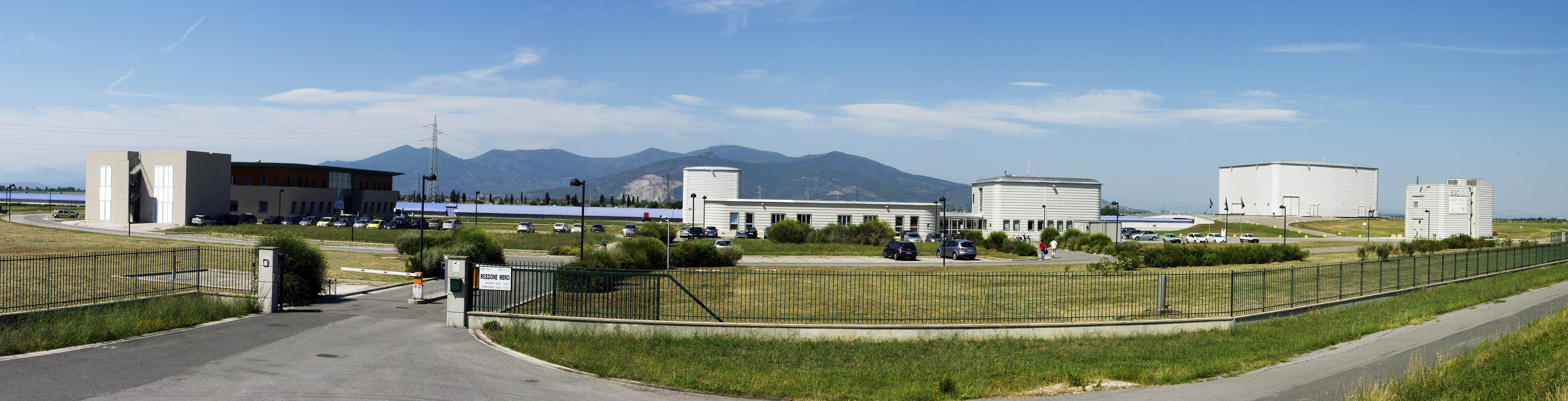
Panorama of the entrance of the Virgo site

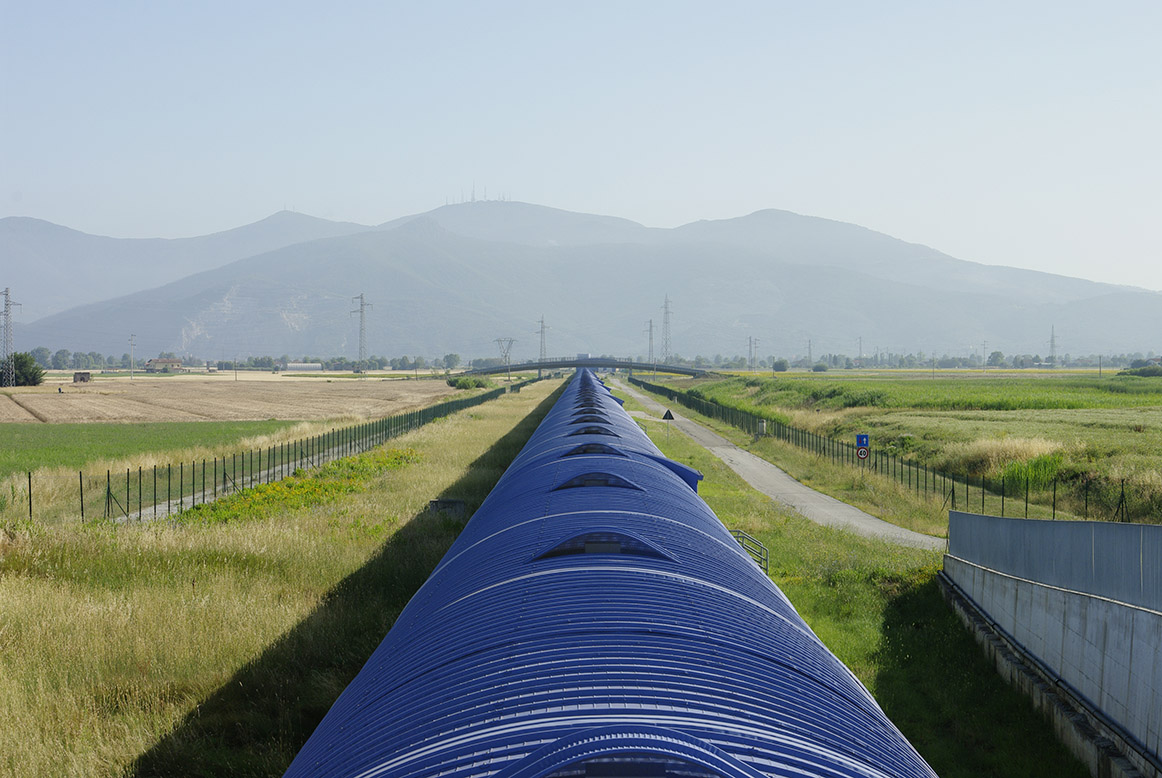
The 3-kilometre-long (1.9 mi) north arm

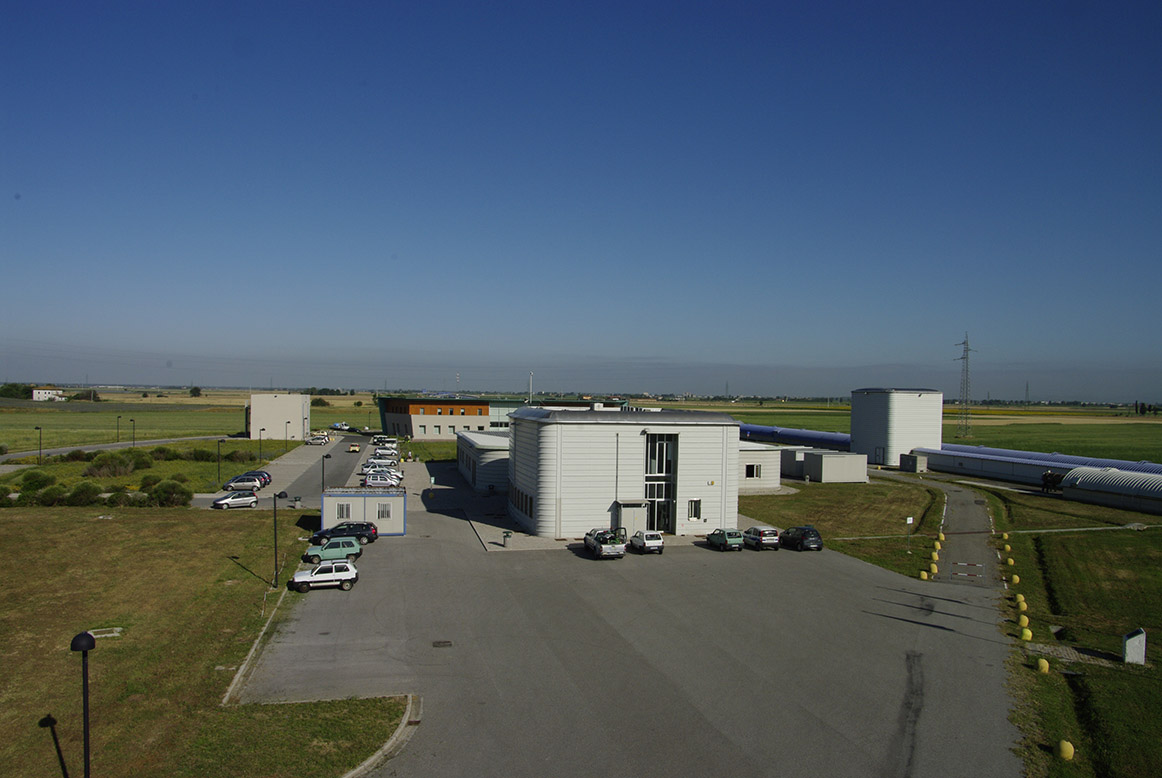
(Front) Detector control-room building and local computer center

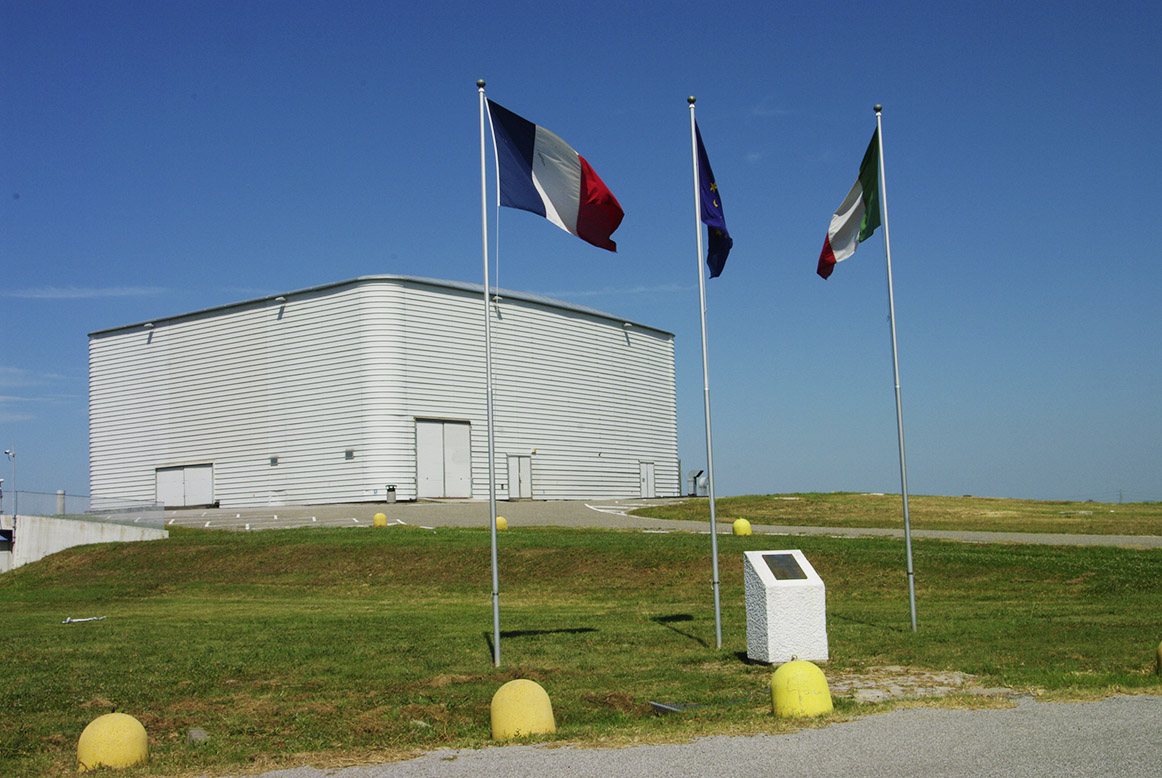
The central building, containing most of the instrument critical components

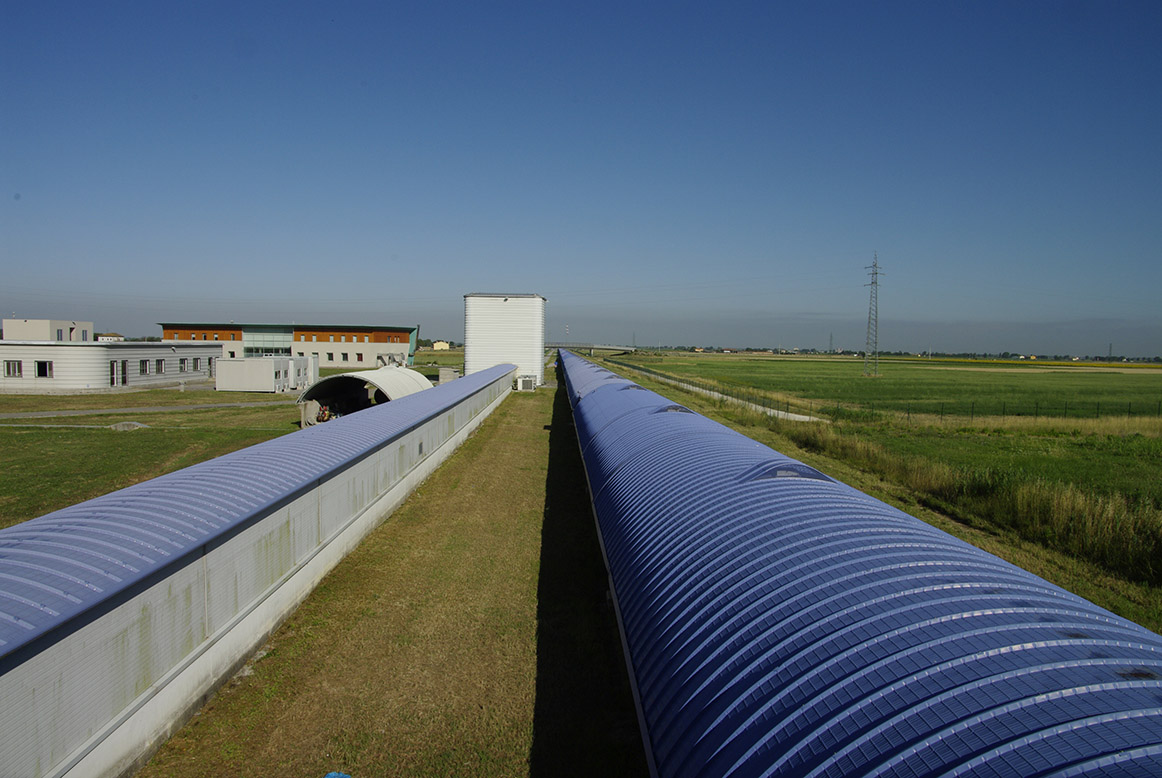
The mode-cleaner cavity (left, which filters the laser beam) and the west arm

From the air, the Virgo detector has an "L" shape with its two 3-kilometre-long (1.9 mi) perpendicular arms. At the intersection of the two arms, the central building is found, containing most of Virgo's key components including the laser, the beamsplitter and the input mirrors. Alongside the west arm, a shorter cavity and the associated building host the input mode-cleaner. The end mirrors are contained in a dedicated building at the end of each arm. South of the west arm, additional buildings contains offices, workshops, as well as the site computing center and the instrument control room.

The arm "tunnels" house pipes in which the laser beams travel in a vacuum. Virgo is one of Europe's largest ultra-high vacuum installation, with a volume of 6,800 cubic meters (1,800,000 U.S. gal). The two 3 km (1.9 mi) arms are made of a long steel pipe 1.2 m (3.9 ft) in diameter, in which the target residual pressure is about one-thousandth of a billionth of an atmosphere (100 times thinner than in the original Virgo). The residual gas molecules, primarily hydrogen and water, have a limited impact on the laser beams' path. Large gate valves are at both ends of the arms so work can be done in the mirror-vacuum towers without breaking an arm's ultra-high vacuum. The towers containing the mirrors and attenuators are split into two sections, with different pressures. The tubes undergo a process, known as baking, in which they are heated to 150 °C (302 °F) to remove unwanted particles from their surfaces; although the towers were also baked in the initial Virgo design, cryogenic traps are now used to prevent contamination.

Due to the interferometer's high power, its mirrors are susceptible to the effects of heating induced by the laser (despite extremely low absorption). These effects can cause deformation of the surface due to dilation or a change in refractive index of the substrate, resulting in power escaping from the interferometer and perturbations of the signal. These effects are accounted for by a thermal compensation system (TCS) which includes Hartmann wavefront sensors to measure optical aberration through an auxiliary light source, and two actuators: CO_{2} lasers (which heat parts of the mirror to correct the defects) and ring heaters, which adjust the mirror's radius of curvature. The system also corrects "cold defects": permanent defects introduced during mirror manufacture. During the O3 run, the TCS increased power inside the interferometer by 15 per cent and decreased power leaving the interferometer by a factor of two.

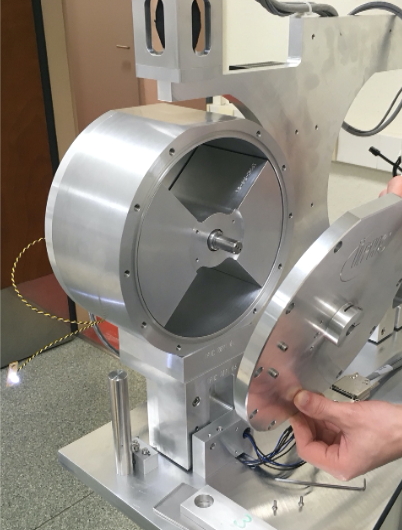
A Newtonian calibrator ("NCal") before installation at the detector. Several are installed near an end mirror; movement of the rotor generates a varying gravitational force on the mirror, permitting controlled movement.

Another important component is the system for controlling stray light (any light leaving the interferometer's designated path, by scattering on a surface or from unwanted reflection). Recombination of stray light with the interferometer's main beam can be a significant noise source, often difficult to track and model. Most efforts to mitigate stray light are based on absorbing plates (known as baffles) placed near the optics and within the tubes; additional precautions are taken to prevent the baffles from affecting interferometer operation.

Calibration is required to estimate the detector's response to gravitational waves and correctly reconstruct the signal. It involves moving the mirrors in a controlled way and measuring the result. During the initial Virgo era, this was primarily achieved by agitating a pendulum on which the mirror is suspended with coils to generate a magnetic field interacting with magnets fixed to the pendulum. This technique was used until O2. For O3, the primary calibration method was photon calibration (PCal); it had been a secondary method to validate the results, using an auxiliary laser to displace the mirror with radiation pressure. A method known as Newtonian calibration (NCal) was introduced at the end of O2 to validate the PCal results; it relies on gravity to move the mirror, placing a rotating mass at a specific distance from it. At the beginning of the second part of O4, Ncal became the main calibration method because it performed better than PCal; PCal is still used to validate NCal results and probe higher frequencies which are inaccessible to the NCal.

The instrument requires an efficient data-acquisition system which manages data measured at the interferometer's output and from sensors on the site, writing it in files and distributing the files for data analysis. Dedicated electronic hardware and software have been developed for this purpose.

=== Noise and sensitivity ===
==== Noise sources ====
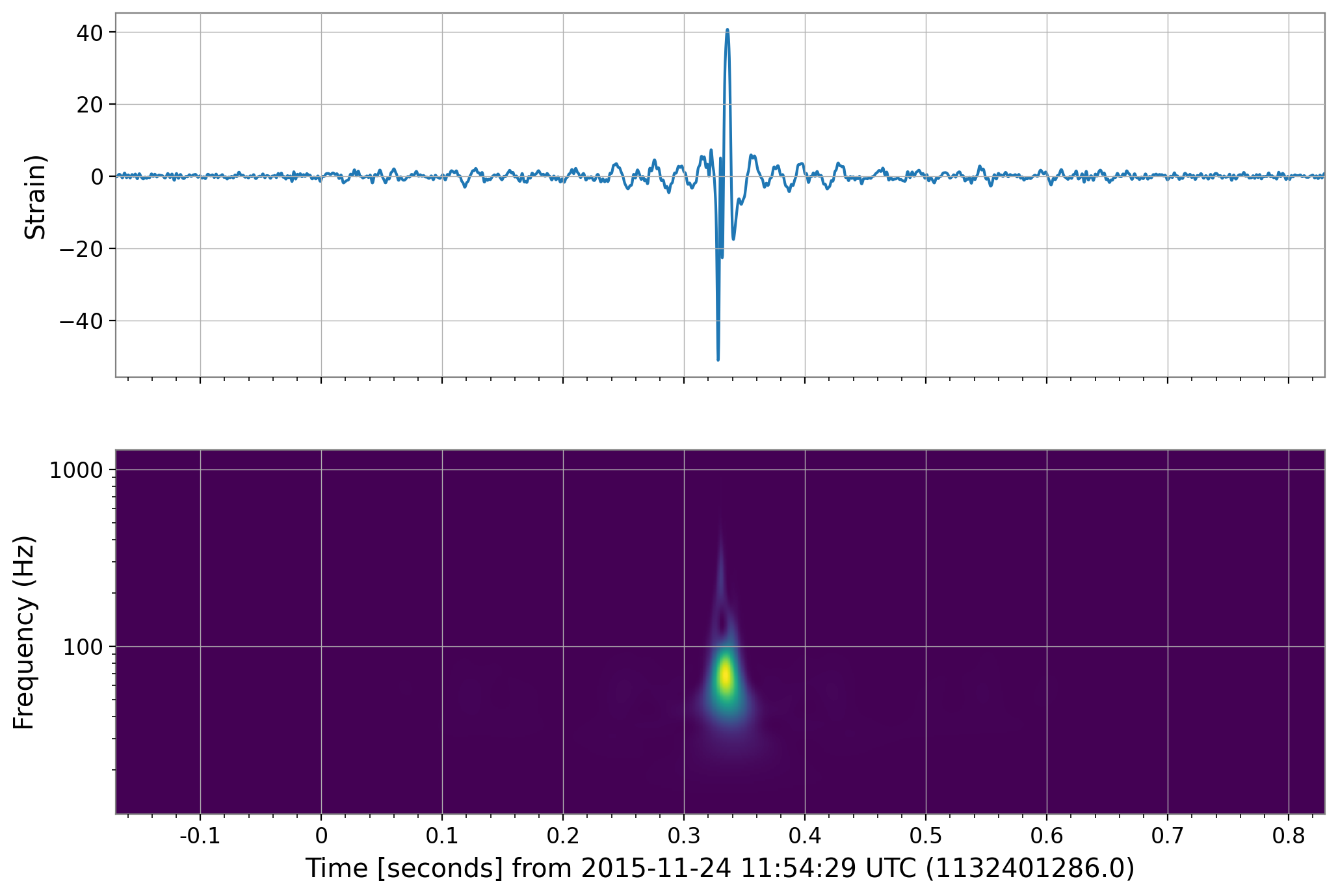
"Koi fish" glitch from 2015 LIGO Hanford data. The top is the detector output (strain) as a function of time, and the bottom is the frequency distribution of the power. This type of glitch is of unknown origin and covers a broad frequency range, with characteristic "fins" at lower frequencies.

The Virgo detector is sensitive to several noise sources which limit its ability to detect gravitational-wave signals. Some have large frequency ranges and limit the overall sensitivity of the detector, such as:

- seismic noise (any ground motion from sources such as waves in the Mediterranean Sea, wind, or human activity), generally in low frequencies up to about 10 Hertz (Hz)
- thermal noise of the mirrors and their suspension wires corresponding to the agitation of the mirror or suspension from its own temperature, from a few tens to a few hundred Hz
- quantum noise, which includes laser shot noise corresponding to fluctuation in power received by the photodiodes and relevant above a few hundred Hz, and radiation pressure noise corresponding to pressure by the laser on the mirror (relevant at low frequency)
- Newtonian noise, caused by tiny fluctuations in the Earth's gravitational field which affect the position of the mirror; relevant below 20 Hz

In addition to these broad noise sources, others may affect specific frequencies. These include a source at 50 Hz (and harmonics at 100, 150, and 200 Hz), corresponding to the frequency of the European power grid; "violin modes" at 300 Hz (and several harmonics), corresponding to the resonant frequency of the suspension fibres (which can vibrate at a specific frequency, as the strings of a violin do); and calibration lines, appearing when mirrors are moved for calibration.

Additional noise sources may have a short-term impact; bad weather or earthquakes may temporarily increase the noise level. Short-lived artefacts may appear in the data due to many possible instrumental issues, and are usually referred to as "glitches". It is estimated that about 20 per cent of detected events are impacted by glitches, requiring specific data-processing methods to mitigate their impact.

==== Detector sensitivity ====
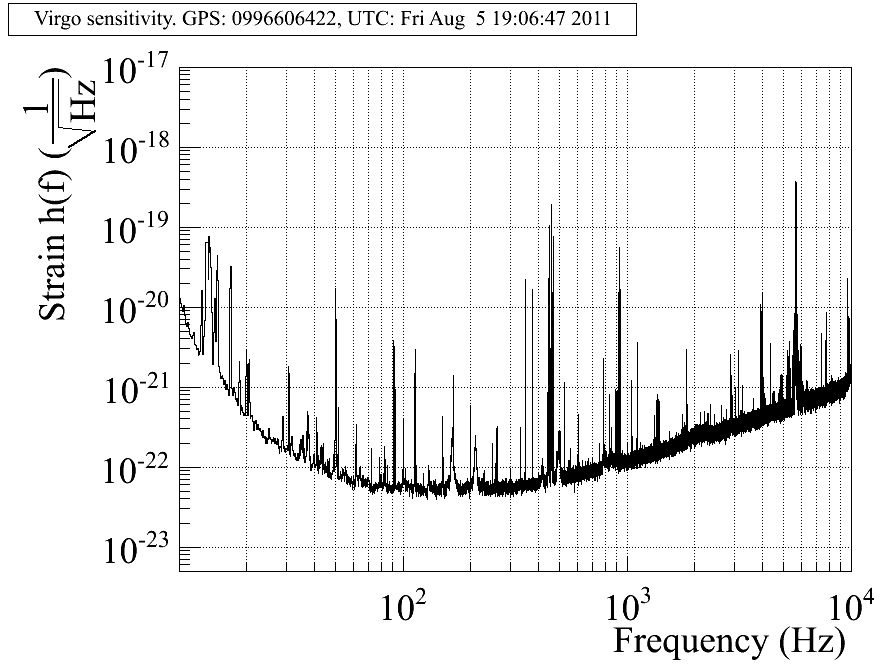
Sensitivity curve in the Virgo detector from 10 Hz to 10 kHz, computed in August 2011. Its shape is typical; the thermal noise of the mirror suspension pendulum dominates at low frequency, and the increase at high frequency is due to laser shot noise. In between are resonances and instrumental noises, including the 50-Hz utility frequency and its harmonics.

Sensitivity depends on frequency, and is usually represented as a curve corresponding to the noise power spectrum (or amplitude spectrum, the square root of the power spectrum); the lower the curve, the greater the sensitivity. Virgo is a wide-band detector whose sensitivity ranges from a few Hz to 10 kHz; a 2011 Virgo sensitivity curve is plotted with a log-log scale.

The most common measure of gravitational-wave-detector sensitivity is the range distance, defined as the distance at which a reference target produces a signal-to-noise ratio of 8 in the detector. The reference is usually a binary neutron star with both components having a mass of 1.4 solar masses; the distance is generally expressed in megaparsecs. The range for Virgo during the O3 run was between 40 and 50 Mpc. This range is an indicator, not a maximal range for the detector; signals from more massive sources will have a larger amplitude, and can be detected from further away.

Calculations indicate that the detector sensitivity roughly scales as $\frac{1}{L\times\sqrt{P}}$, where $L$ is the arm-cavity length and $P$ the laser power on the beam splitter. To improve it, these quantities must be increased. This is achieved with long arms, optical cavities inside the arm to maximise exposure to the signal, and power recycling to increase power in the arms.

== Data analysis ==
An important part of Virgo collaboration resources is dedicated to the development and deployment of data-analysis software designed to process the detector's output. Apart from the data-acquisition software and tools for distributing the data, the effort is shared with members of the LIGO and KAGRA collaborations as part of the LIGO-Virgo-KAGRA (LVK) collaboration.

Data from the detector is initially only available to LVK members. Segments of data surrounding detected events are released at the publication of the related paper, and the full data is released after a proprietary period (currently 18 months). During the third observing run (O3), this resulted in two separate data releases (O3a and O3b) corresponding to the first and last six months of the run. The data is then generally available on the Gravitational Wave Open Science Center (GWOSC) platform.

Analysis of the data requires a variety of techniques targeting different types of sources. Most of the effort is dedicated to the detection and analysis of mergers of compact objects, the only type of source detected until now. Analysis software is running the data in search of this type of event, and a dedicated infrastructure is used to alert the online community. Other efforts are carried out after the data-acquisition period (offline), including searches for continuous sources, a stochastic background, or deeper analysis of detected events.

== Scientific results ==
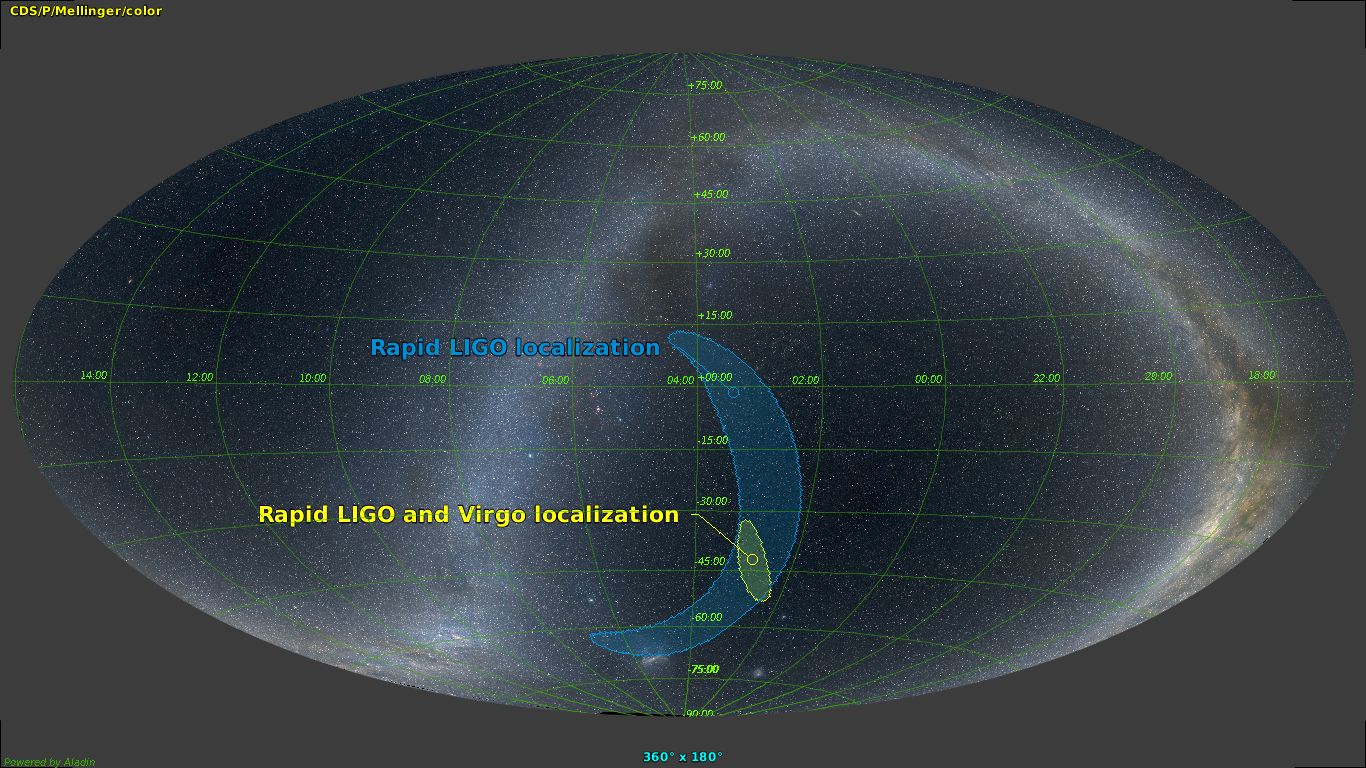
Sky localisation of the GW170814 event with the two LIGO detectors and the full network. The addition of Virgo allows for more-precise localisation.

Virgo first detected a gravitational signal during the second observation run (O2) of the "advanced" era; only the LIGO detectors were operating during the first observation run. The event, named GW170814, was a coalescence between two black holes. It was the first event detected by three different detectors, allowing for greatly-improved localisation compared to events from the first observation run. It also allowed for the first conclusive measure of gravitational-wave polarisation, providing evidence against polarisations other than those predicted by general relativity.

It was soon followed by the better-known GW170817, the first merger of two neutron stars detected by the gravitational-wave network and (as of February 2025) the only event with a confirmed detection of an electromagnetic counterpart in gamma rays, optical telescopes, radio and x-ray domains. No signal was observed in Virgo, but this absence was crucial to more tightly constrain the event's localisation, as it allows to exclude regions of the sky where the signal would have been visible in Virgo data. This event, involving over 4,000 astronomers, improved the understanding of neutron-star mergers and put tight constraints on the speed of gravity.

Several searches for continuous gravitational waves have been performed on data from past runs. O3-run searches include an all-sky search, targeted searches toward Scorpius X-1 and several known pulsars (including the Crab and Vela Pulsars), and a directed search towards the supernova remnants Cassiopeia A and Vela Jr. and the Galactic Center. Although none of the searches identified a signal, this enabled upper limits to be set on some parameters; in particular, it was found that the deviation from perfect spinning spheres for close known pulsars is at most 1 mm (0.039 in).

Virgo was included in the latest search for a gravitational-wave background with LIGO, combining the results of O3 with the O1 and O2 runs (which only used LIGO data). No stochastic background was observed, improving previous constraints on the energy of the background by an order of magnitude.

Broad estimates of the Hubble constant have also been obtained; the current best estimate is 68^{+12}_{-8} km s^{−1} Mpc^{−1}, combining results from binary black holes and the GW170817 event. This result is consistent with other estimates of the constant, but not precise enough to solve the current debates about its exact value.

== Outreach ==
The Virgo Collaboration participates in several activities promoting communication and education about gravitational waves for the general public. One example of an activity is guided tours of the Virgo facilities for schools, universities, and the public; however, many of outreach activities take place outside the Virgo site. This includes public lectures and courses about Virgo activities and participation in science festivals, and developing methods and devices for the public understanding of gravitational waves and related topics. The Collaboration is involved in several artistic projects, ranging from visual projects such as "The Rhythm of Space" at the Museo della Grafica in Pisa and "On Air" at the Palais de Tokyo to concerts. It includes activities promoting gender equality in science, highlighting women working in Virgo in communications to the general public.
