= Allegro gravitational-wave detector =

Gravitational-wave detector

- Location(s): Louisiana

Allegro was a ground-based, cryogenic resonant Weber bar, gravitational-wave detector run by Warren Johnson, et al. at Louisiana State University in Baton Rouge, Louisiana. The detector was commissioned in the early 1990s, and was decommissioned in 2008.

== Mechanical design ==
The resonant bar in Allegro is 2300 kg of aluminum, 3 meters in length. Suspended in a cryogenic vacuum tank at 4.2 Kelvin, the bar's natural resonant frequency (the lowest longitudinal mode) is near 904 Hz.

The strain on the bar is measured by coupling a second, much lighter, suspended mass to the main heavier mass as a mechanical transformer at the same resonant frequency. Therefore, small motions of the primary mass generate much larger motions in the smaller mass. The differential displacement of the two masses is recorded using an inductive transducer and amplifier (a SQUID).

== Collaboration with LIGO ==
Due its close proximity to the LIGO Livingston Detector (one in the array of three, large-scale, laser interferometric detectors), Allegro has partnered with the LIGO Scientific collaboration to produce several results during the fourth science run of LIGO.
