= Douglas Mountain (Washington) =

Mountain in Washington (state), United States

Coordinates: 48°45′40″N 119°42′41″W

Douglas Mountain is a summit in Okanogan County, Washington, in the United States. With an elevation of 5,298 feet (1,615 m), Douglas Mountain is the 1273rd highest summit in the state of Washington.

Douglas Mountain was named after Douglas Joe, a local miner.
