= MiniGrail =

Resonant mass antenna

- Location(s): Netherlands
- Website: www.minigrail.nl

MiniGRAIL was a third-generation resonant mass antenna, a massive sphere designed to detect gravitational waves. The MiniGRAIL was the first such detector to use a spherical design. It is located at Leiden University in the Netherlands. The project was managed by the Kamerlingh Onnes Laboratory. A team from the Department of Theoretical Physics of the University of Geneva, Switzerland, was also heavily involved. The project was terminated in 2005.

Gravitational waves are a type of radiation that is emitted by objects that have mass and are undergoing acceleration. The strongest sources of gravitational waves are suspected to be compact objects such as neutron stars and black holes. This detector may be able to detect certain types of instabilities in rotating single and binary neutron stars, and the merger of small black holes or neutron stars.

== Design ==
A spherical design has the benefit of being able to detect gravitational waves arriving from any direction, and it is sensitive to polarization. When gravitation waves with frequencies around 3,000 Hz pass through the MiniGRAIL ball, it will vibrate with displacements on the order of 10^{−20} m. For comparison, the cross-section of a single proton (the nucleus of a hydrogen atom), is 10^{−15} m (1 fm).

To improve sensitivity, the detector was intended to operate at a temperature of 20 mK. The original antenna for the MiniGRAIL detector was a 68 cm diameter sphere made of an alloy of copper with 6% aluminium. This sphere had a mass of 1,150 kg and resonated at a frequency of 3,250 Hz. It was isolated from vibration by seven 140 kg masses. The bandwidth of the detector was expected to be ±230 Hz.

During the casting of the sphere, a crack appeared that reduced the quality to unacceptable levels. It was replaced by a 68 cm sphere with a mass of 1,300 kg. This was manufactured by ItalBronze in Brazil. The larger mass lowered the resonant frequencies by about 200 Hz. The sphere is suspended from stainless steel cables to which springs and masses are attached to dampen vibrations. Cooling is accomplished using a dilution refrigerator.

Tests at temperatures of 5 K showed that the detector had a peak strain sensitivity of 1.5 × 10^{−20} Hz^{−1/2} at a frequency of 2942.9 Hz. Over a bandwidth of 30 Hz, the strain sensitivity was more than 5 × 10^{−20} Hz^{−1/2}. This sensitivity is expected to improve by an order of magnitude when the instrument is operating at 50 mK.

A similar detector named "Mario Schenberg" is located in São Paulo. The co-operation of the detectors strongly increase the chances of detection by looking at coincidences.
