= Mount David Douglas =

Mountain in Oregon, United States

- Location within Oregon

Highest point
- Elevation: 6,255 ft (1,907 m) NGVD 29
- Prominence: 775 ft (236 m)
- Coordinates: 43°39′13″N 122°09′44″W

Geography
- Location: Lane County, Oregon
- Parent range: Cascade Range
- Topo map: USGS Mount David Douglas

Mount David Douglas is a summit in Lane County, Oregon, in the United States. The peak was named for David Douglas, a Scottish botanist. The Douglas Fir was also named in honor of David Douglas.
