= Weber bar =

Device used in gravitational wave observatories

- Wavelength: 1,660, 1,220 Hz (181, 246 km)

A Weber bar is a type of resonant mass gravitational wave detector designed to detect gravitational waves, devised and constructed by physicist Joseph Weber at the University of Maryland. Multiple of these devices were made, both of consisting of aluminium cylinders and stated to be 1.5 (5ft) meters in length, 0.6m (2ft) and 0.2m (8") in diameter, antennae for detecting gravitational waves. There is a third with a 1220 hertz resonance without stated length parameters.

A resonant mass gravitational wave detector in the style of the Weber bar is on display at Glasgow University.

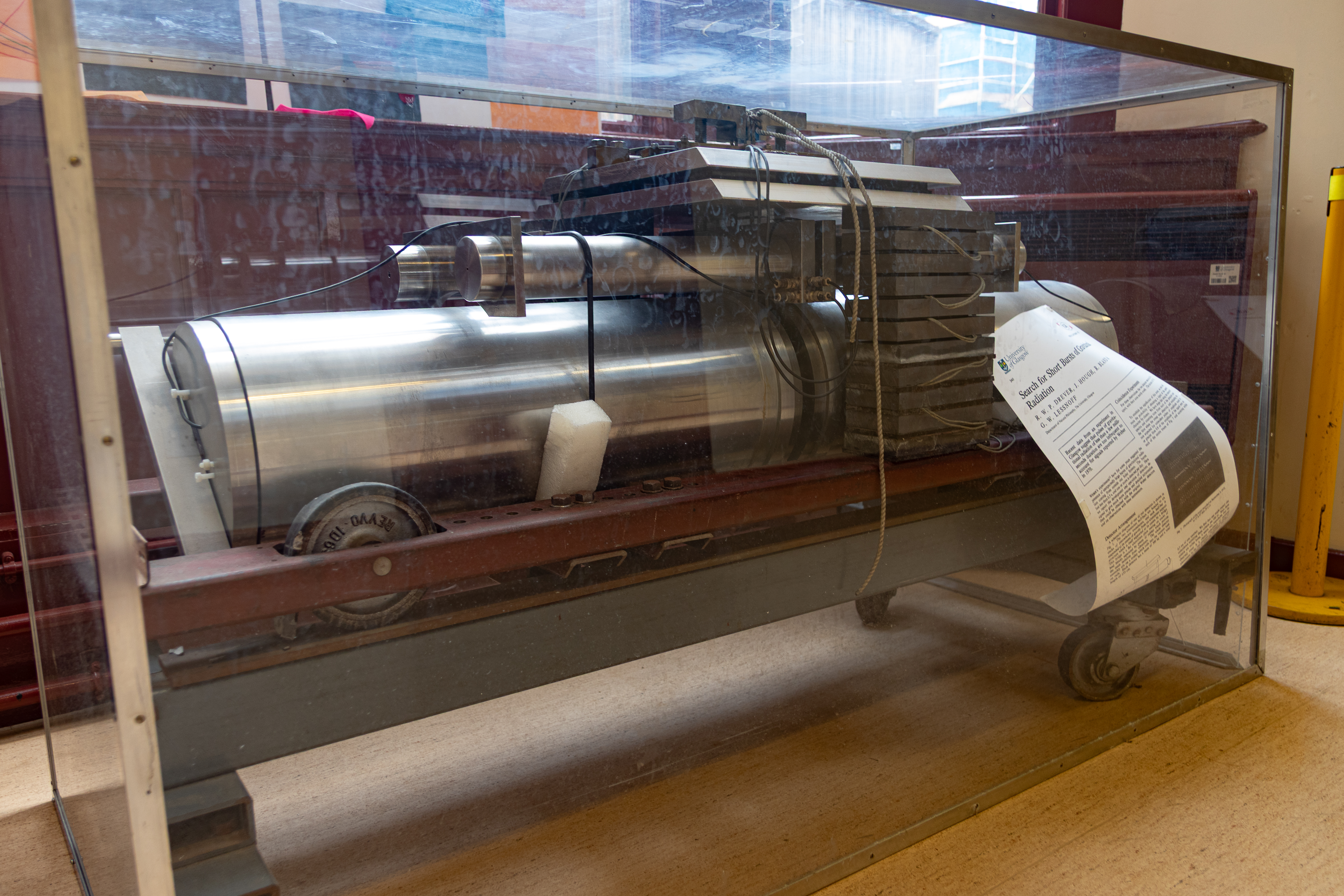
The detector used in the "Search for Short Bursts of Gravitational Radiation" at Glasgow University

== Mechanism ==
These massive aluminium cylinders vibrated at a resonance frequency of 1660 or 1220 hertz and were designed to be set in motion by gravitational waves predicted by the general theory of relativity. Because gravitational waves were predicted to be very weak, the size of the bars and were designed to be large to compensate since these waves cause a percentage change in length. These tiny displacements are then read out by piezoelectric sensors which had to be very sensitive, capable of detecting a change in the cylinders' lengths by about 10^{−16} meters.

These bars were situated in a vacuum chamber, hung on acoustic filters which appear to be made up of masses on springs, with further isolation via rubber pads situated between steel blocks.

== History ==
Around 1968, Weber collected what he concluded to be "good evidence" of the theorized phenomenon; additionally writing newspaper articles stating as such. However, his experiments were duplicated many times, always with a null result.

Such experiments conducted by Joseph Weber were very controversial, and his positive results with the apparatus, in particular his claim to have detected gravitational waves from SN1987A in 1987, were widely discredited. Criticisms of the study have focused on Weber's data analysis and his incomplete definitions of what strength vibration would signify a passing gravitational wave.

Weber's first "Gravitational Wave Antenna" was on display in the Smithsonian Institution as part of "Einstein: a Centenary Exhibit" from March 1979 to March 1980. A second is on display at the LIGO Hanford Observatory.

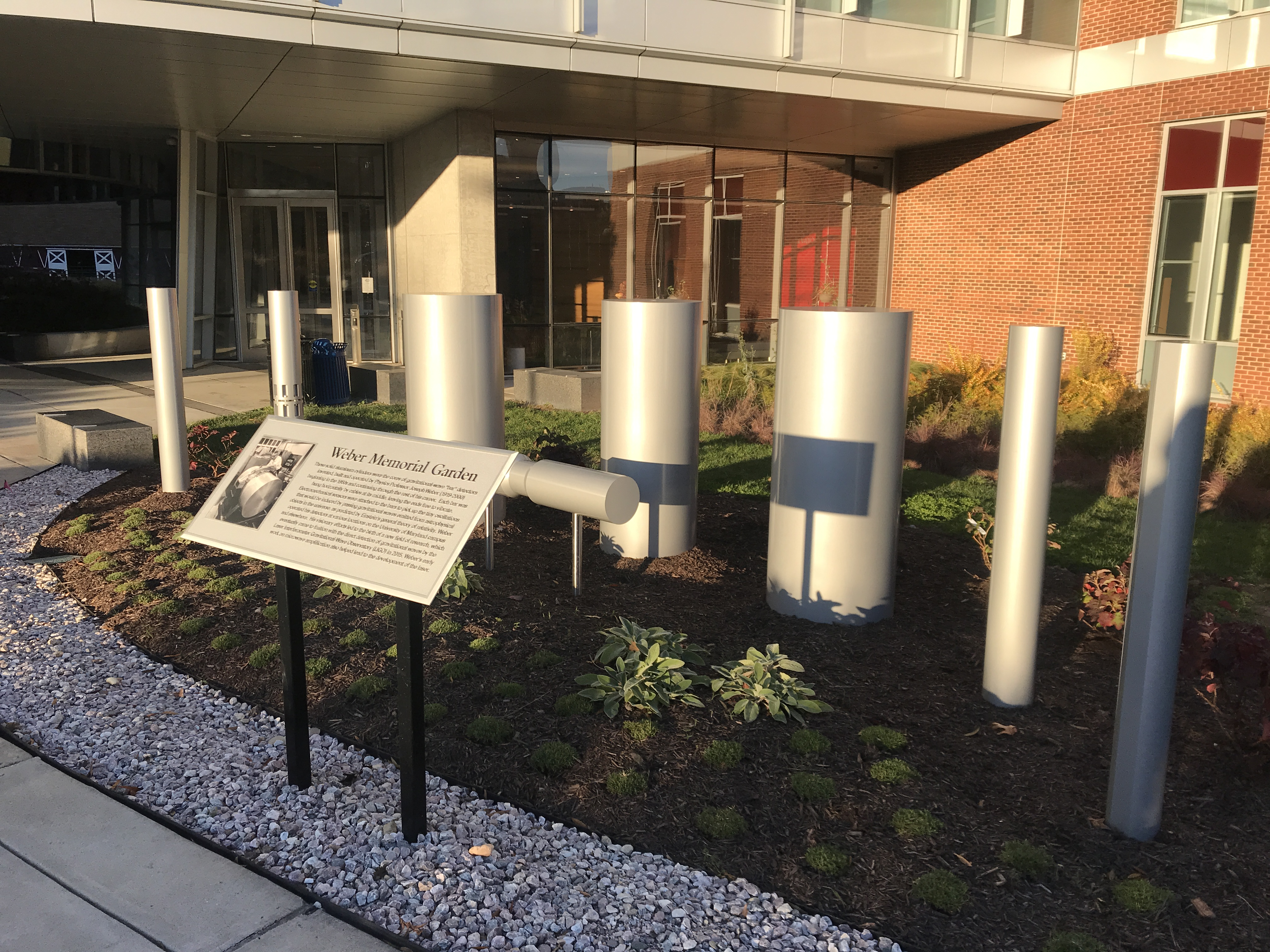
The Weber Memorial Garden at the University of Maryland

Weber Memorial Garden was dedicated 2019 at the University of Maryland, where Weber was a faculty member. The garden contains eight of the cores of Weber's bar detectors.
