= David Douglass (physicist) =

American physicist

David H. Douglass
- Born: 1932 (age 93–94)
- Education: University of Maine, MIT
- Scientific career
- Fields: Solid-state physics
- Workplaces: University of Rochester
- Thesis: Antiferromagnetic resonance in manganous chloride (1959)

David H. Douglass (born 1932) is an American physicist at the University of Rochester.

== Climate change ==
A 2005 study by Douglass and fellow University of Rochester physicist Robert S. Knox argued that global climate models underestimated the climate response to the 1991 eruption of Mount Pinatubo. The study also contended that global temperature returned to normal much faster after the eruption than the models had predicted.

A 2007 paper by Douglass and coworkers questioned the reliability of 22 of the most commonly used global climate models analyzed by Benjamin D. Santer and used by the IPCC to predict accelerated warming in the troposphere. The study had originally been submitted to Geophysical Research Letters the previous year, but was rejected in September 2006 on Santer's recommendation. Santer and 17 co-authors later rebutted Douglass' paper.

Douglass was named a fellow of Alfred P. Sloan Foundation in 1963 and elected a fellow of the American Physical Society in 1969. He is a Fellow of the New York Academy of Sciences.
