= Deci-hertz Interferometer Gravitational wave Observatory =

Proposed gravitational wave observatory

DECIGO
- Mission type: Gravitational waves observation
- Operator: ISAS/JAXA
- Website: https://decigo.jp/index_E.html

Start of mission
- Launch date: 2030s (planned)

Orbital parameters
- Reference system: Heliocentric
- Semi-major axis: 1 astronomical unit (150 million kilometres)
- Period: 1 year
- Epoch: planned

The DECi-hertz Interferometer Gravitational wave Observatory (or DECIGO) is a proposed Japanese space-based gravitational wave observatory. The laser interferometric gravitational wave detector is designed to be most sensitive in the frequency band between 0.1 and 10 Hz, filling in the gap between the sensitive bands of LIGO and LISA. Its precursor mission, B-DECIGO, is currently planned for launch in the 2030s, with DECIGO launching at some time afterward.

The design is similar to LISA, with four zero-drag satellite clusters (two colocated) in a triangular arrangement, but using a smaller separation of only 1000 km whose relative displacements are measured by a Fabry–Pérot Michelson interferometer.

== Description ==
The DECi-hertz Interferometer Gravitational Wave Observatory (DECIGO) is a proposed Japanese space-based gravitational wave observatory. It was first described as a "short range space gravity wave antenna" (短距離型スペース重力波アンテナ, Tankyorigata Supēsu Jūryokuha Antena) in a presentation given by Seiji Kawamura in an October 2000 presentation given at the ICRR Satellite Symposium held by the National Astronomical Observatory of Japan. The first mention of the observatory as "DECIGO" was in a presentation given by Naoki Seto, Kawamura, and Takashi Nakamura at a September 2001 meeting of the Physical Society of Japan at Okinawa International University.

It was designed as a follow-up project to KAGRA by the Japanese Gravitational Wave Community (JGWC), and it was originally planned to be launched in 2027. A 2008 paper in the Journal of Physics: Conference Series in 2008, authored by 135 scientists headed by Kawamura, went into significantly more detail, describing the basic initial design ideas. It is designed to be most sensitive in the frequency band between 0.1 and 10 Hz, which better detects gravity waves in the gap between the sensitivity bands of LIGO and LISA.

In a 2021 update, it was described as "four clusters of observatories" placed in heliocentric orbits, with each cluster consisting of an equilateral triangle with legs (or sides) of 1,000 kilometres (620 mi) and a zero-drag satellite at each point. Three of the clusters will be spaced equally around the Sun, and the other will be placed in the same location as one of the others. The placement is designed to facilitate "correlation signals for the detection of primordial gravitational waves". It is planned to launch an unspecified time following B-DECIGO, which has a projected launch sometime in the 2030s.

== B-DECIGO ==
B-DECIGO is a preliminary test of various technologies to be used in DECIGO. It will consist of a single cluster of observatories, each having arm lengths of 100 kilometres (62 mi), a laser wattage of 1 (rather than the 10 watts used for DECIGO), and a mirror mass of 30 kilograms (66 lb). The target is an Earth orbit with an average altitude of 2,000 kilometres (1,200 mi). As of 2021, it is planned for launch in the 2030s.

== See also ==
- Laser Interferometer Space Antenna (LISA)
- List of proposed space telescopes
