= Spin parameter =

Spin parameter may refer to one of several different parameters in physics.

== Black hole physics ==
One of two dimensionless parameters relating to black holes:

- The spin parameter of an individual black hole, a variable with a value ranging from 0 to 1
- The effective inspiral spin parameter for a pair of merging black holes, a variable with a value ranging from −1 to 1

== Particle physics ==
- The spin quantum number of an elementary particle, usually called just "spin", a constant with a value of n/2, where n is a non-negative integer
