= GW190412 =

Gravitational-wave signal

GW 190412 was a gravitational wave (GW) signal observed by the LIGO and Virgo detectors on 12 April 2019. In April 2020, it was announced as the first time a collision of a pair of very differently sized black holes has been detected. As a result of this asymmetry, the signal included two measurable harmonics with frequencies approximately a factor 1.5 (a perfect fifth) apart.

The collision took place 2.4 billion light-years away. The heavier of the black holes had a mass of 30.1+4.6
−5.3 M_{☉}, and the lighter one around 8.3+1.6
−0.9 M_{☉}. The difference in mass meant that the secondary harmonic in the signal was strong enough to be detected, allowing researchers to perform a test of general relativity and determine that the larger black hole was spinning.

== See also ==
- Gravitational-wave astronomy
- List of gravitational wave observations
