= List of gravitational wave observations =

The first measurement of a gravitational wave event

This page contains a list of observed and candidate gravitational wave events.

== Origin and nomenclature ==
Direct observation of gravitational waves, which commenced with the detection of an event by LIGO in 2015, plays a key role in gravitational wave astronomy. LIGO has been involved in all subsequent detections to date, with Virgo joining in August 2017.

Joint observation runs of LIGO and Virgo, designated "O1, O2, etc." span many months, with months of maintenance and upgrades in-between designed to increase the instruments sensitivity and range. Within these run periods, the instruments are capable of detecting gravitational waves.

The first run, O1, ran from September 12, 2015, to January 19, 2016, and succeeded in its first gravitational wave detection. O2 ran for a greater duration, from November 30, 2016, to August 25, 2017. O3 began on April 1, 2019. The observing run was split in two, designated "O3a" and "O3b" with the first part suspended on September 30, 2019, for maintenance and upgrades. O3b began on November 1, 2019. Due to the COVID-19 pandemic O3 was forced to end prematurely. The early end meant that KAGRA did not have chance to participate in joint observations with LIGO and Virgo, so a short joint run was done in partnership with GEO. This run was designated "O3GK", and did not result in any additional detections.

O4 began on May 24, 2023; initially planned for March, the project needed more time to stabilize the instruments. The fourth observing run was divided into three parts, designated "O4a", "O4b", and "O4c". The run, initially planned to end after one year, was extended, following plans to make further upgrades for the O5 run. O4a started May 24, 2023 and ended January 16, 2024. O4b started April 10, 2024 and ended January 28, 2025 at 17:00 UTC. Unusually, O4c, followed directly from O4b, starting on January 28, 2025 at 17:00 UTC and concluded on November 18, 2025 at 16:00 UTC. There was a two month commissioning break from January to March 2024, and another from 1 April to a planned 11 June 2025, after which observations resumed. As of May 2025, O5 is planned to begin in late 2027. An intermediate six-month observing run has also been announced, expected to begin in November 2026. Updated observing plans are published on the official website.

Gravitational wave events are named starting with the prefix GW, while observations that trigger an event alert but have not (yet) been confirmed are named starting with the prefix S. Six digits then indicate the date of the event, with the two first digits representing the year, the two middle digits the month and two final digits the day of observation. This is similar to the systematic naming for other kinds of astronomical event observations, such as those of gamma-ray bursts.

Probable detections that are not confidently identified as gravitational wave events are designated LVT ("LIGO-Virgo trigger"). Known gravitational wave events come from the merger of two black holes (BH), two neutron stars (NS), or a black hole and a neutron star (BHNS). Some objects are in the mass gap (MG) between the largest predicted neutron star masses (Tolman–Oppenheimer–Volkoff limit) and the smallest known black holes.

== List of gravitational wave events ==
Events from LIGO & Virgo

O1 & O2/2015-2017 events

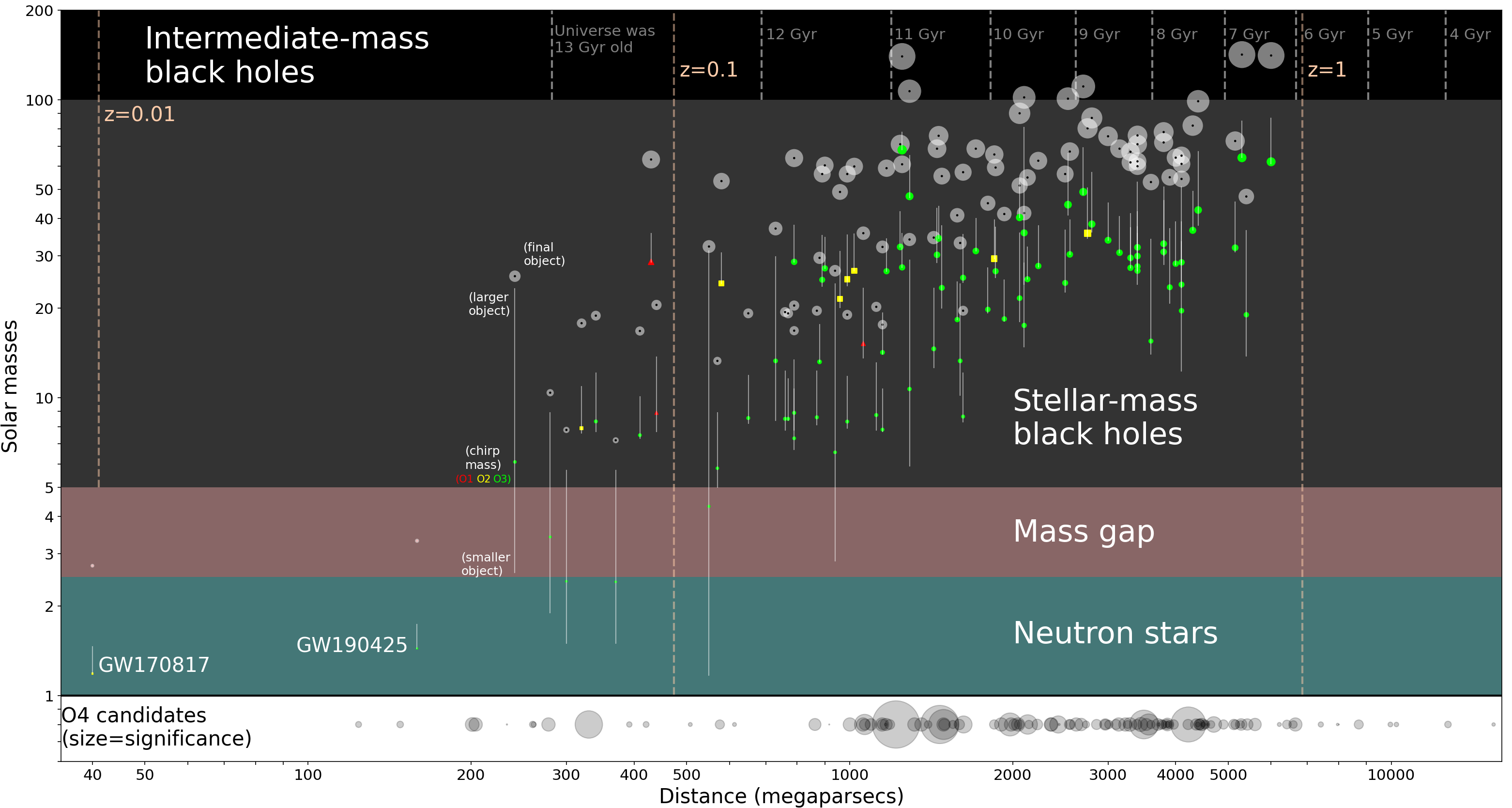
Distance and mass for events up to O4 in 2023

Confirmed events by distance
- BNS mergers
- NS–BH mergers
- mass gap
- BBH mergers

Initial objects by mass
- neutron star
- mass gap
- black hole

List of binary merger events

GW event and time (UTC) (Note: The detection date of a GW event is indicated by its designation; i.e., event GW150914 was detected on 2015-09-14.)	Date published	Location area (Note: The relatively large and distant area of the sky within which it is claimed to be possible to localize the source.) (deg^{2})	Signal to Noise Ratio (SNR)	Luminosity distance (Mpc) (Note: 1 Mpc is approximately 3.26 Mly.)	Chirp mass (M_{☉}) (Note: The chirp mass is the binary parameter most relevant to the evolution of the inspiral gravitational waveform, and thus is the mass that can be measured most accurately. It is related to, but less than, the geometric mean $(m_{geo})$ of the binary masses, according to $m_{geo} \left(\frac{m_{geo}}{m_1 + m_2}\right)^{1/5}$, thus ranging from ~87% of $m_{geo}$ when the masses are the same to ~78% when they differ by an order of magnitude.)	Effective spin (Note: The dimensionless effective inspiral spin parameter is: $\frac{m_1 a_1 cos \theta_{LS_1} + m_2 a_2 cos \theta_{LS_2}}{m_1 + m_2},$ where $m$ is the mass of a black hole, $a$ is its spin, and $\theta_{LS}$ is the angle between the orbital angular momentum and a merging black hole's spin (ranging from $0$ when aligned to $\pi$ when antialigned). It is the mass-weighted linear combination of the components of the black holes' spins aligned with the orbital axis and has values ranging from −1 to 1 (the extremes correspond to situations with both black hole spins exactly antialigned and aligned, respectively, with orbital angular momentum). This is the spin parameter most relevant to the evolution of the inspiral gravitational waveform, and it can be measured more accurately than those of the premerger BHs.)	Primary		Secondary		Remnant			Notes	Ref.
GW event and time (UTC)	Date published	Location area (deg^{2})	Signal to Noise Ratio (SNR)	Luminosity distance (Mpc)	Chirp mass (M_{☉})	Effective spin	Type	Mass (M_{☉})	Type	Mass (M_{☉})	Type	Mass (M_{☉})	Spin (Note: Values of the dimensionless spin parameter $a =$ cJ/GM^{2} for a black hole range from zero to a maximum of one. The macroscopic properties of an isolated astrophysical (uncharged) black hole are fully determined by its mass and spin. Values for other objects can potentially exceed one. The largest value known for a neutron star is ≤ 0.4, and commonly used equations of state would limit that value to < 0.7.)	Notes	Ref.
GW150914; 09:50:45	2016-02-11	179; mostly to the south	24.4+0.8 −0.8	430+150 −170	28.6+1.6 −1.5	−0.01+0.12 −0.13	BH (Note: Spin estimate is 0.26+0.52 −0.24.)	35.6+4.8 −3.0	BH (Note: Spin estimate is 0.32+0.54 −0.29.)	30.6+3.0 −4.4	BH	63.1+3.3 −3.0	0.69+0.05 −0.04	First GW detection; first BH merger observed	
GW151012; 09:54:43	2016-06-15	1555	10.0+0.5 −0.5	1060+540 −480	15.2+2.0 −1.1	0.04+0.28 −0.19	BH	23.3+14.0 −5.5	BH	13.6+4.1 −4.8	BH	35.7+9.9 −3.8	0.67+0.13 −0.11	Formerly candidate LVT151012; accepted as astrophysical since February 2019	
GW151226; 03:38:53	2016-06-15	1033	13.1+0.0 −1.2	440+180 −190	1.0+0.1 −0.2	0.18+0.20 −0.12	BH	13.7+8.8 −3.2	BH	7.7+2.2 −2.6	BH	20.5+6.4 −1.5	0.74+0.07 −0.05		
GW170104; 10:11:58	2017-06-01	924	13.0+0.0 −0.0	960+430 −410	2.2+0.5 −0.5	−0.04+0.17 −0.20	BH	31.0+7.2 −5.6	BH	20.1+4.9 −4.5	BH	49.1+5.2 −3.5	0.66+0.08 −0.10		
GW170608; 02:01:16	2017-11-16	396; to the north	14.9+0.5 −0.8	320+120 −110	0.9+0.0 −0.1	0.03+0.19 −0.07	BH	10.9+5.3 −1.7	BH	7.6+1.3 −2.1	BH	17.8+3.2 −0.7	0.69+0.04 −0.04	Smallest BH progenitor masses to date	
GW170729; 18:56:29	2018-11-30	1033	10.2+0.6 −0.4	2750+1350 −1320	4.8+1.7 −1.7	0.36+0.21 −0.25	BH	50.6+16.6 −10.2	BH	34.3+9.1 −10.1	BH	80.3+14.6 −10.2	0.81+0.07 −0.13	Largest progenitor masses until GW190521	
GW170809; 08:28:21	2018-11-30	340; towards Cetus	12.4+0.0 −0.2	990+320 −380	2.7+0.6 −0.6	0.07+0.16 −0.16	BH	35.2+8.3 −6.0	BH	23.8+5.2 −5.1	BH	56.4+5.2 −3.7	0.70+0.08 −0.09		
GW170814; 10:30:43	2017-09-27	87; towards Eridanus	16.3+0.9 −0.4	580+160 −210	2.7+0.4 −0.3	0.07+0.12 −0.11	BH	30.7+5.7 −3.0	BH	25.3+2.9 −4.1	BH	53.4+3.2 −2.4	0.72+0.07 −0.05	First announced detection by three observatories; first polarization measurement	
GW170817; 12:41:04	2017-10-16	16; NGC 4993	33.0+0.0 −2.1	40±10	1.186+0.001 −0.001	0.00+0.02 −0.01	NS	1.46+0.12 −0.10	NS	1.27+0.09 −0.09	HMNS-BH (Note: Based on a descending spin-down GW-chirp lasting 3.7 seconds post-merger, a hyper-massive neutron star was produced in delayed gravitational collapse to a Kerr black hole after 0.92 seconds.)	≤ 2.8 (Note: Besides the loss of mass due to GW emission that occurred during the merger, the event is thought to have ejected 0.05±0.02 M_{☉} of material.)	≤ 0.89	First NS merger observed in GW; first detection of EM counterpart (GRB 170817A; AT 2017gfo); nearest event to date	
GW170818; 02:25:09	2018-11-30	39; towards Pegasus	11.3+0.0 −0.0	1020+430 −360	26.7+2.1 −1.7	−0.09+0.18 −0.21	BH	35.5+7.5 −4.7	BH	26.8+4.3 −5.2	BH	59.8+4.8 −3.8	0.67+0.07 −0.08		
GW170823; 13:13:58	2018-11-30	1651	11.1+0.4 −0.3	1850±840	29.3+4.2 −3.2	0.08+0.20 −0.22	BH	39.6+10.0 −6.6	BH	29.4+6.3 −7.1	BH	65.6+9.4 −6.6	0.71+0.08 −0.10		
GW190403_051519; 2019-04-03 05:15:19	2022-05-11	3900	7.6+0.6 −1.1	8300+6700 −4300	34.0+15.1 −8.4	0.68+0.16 −0.43	BH	85.0+6.7 −4.3	BH	20.0+26.3 −8.4	BH	102+26 −24	0.91+0.05 −0.17		
GW190408_181802; 2019-04-08 18:18:02	2020-10-27	140	15.3+0.2 −0.3	1580+400 −590	18.3+1.4 −1.2	−0.03+0.13 −0.19	BH	24.5+5.1 −3.4	BH	18.3+3.2 −3.5	BH	41.0+3.8 −2.7	0.67+0.06 −0.07	Originally designated S190408an.	
GW190412; 2019-04-12; 05:30:44	2020-04-17	156; towards Virgo or Boötes	18.9+0.2 −0.3	730+140 −170	13.3+0.4 −0.3	0.25+0.08 −0.11	BH	29.7+5.0 −5.3	BH	8.4+1.8 −1.0	BH	37.0+4.1 −3.9	0.67+0.05 −0.07	First possible observation of a merger of two black holes of very different masses. Originally designated S190412m.	
GW190413_052954; 2019-04-13	2020-10-27	1400	8.9+0.4 −0.7	4100+2410 −1890	24.0+5.4 −3.7	0.01+0.29 −0.33	BH	33.4+12.4 −7.4	BH	23.4+6.7 −6.3	BH	54.3+12.4 −8.4	0.69+0.12 −0.13		
GW190413_134308; 2019-04-13	2020-10-27	520	10.0+0.4 −0.5	5150+2440 −2340	31.9+7.3 −4.6	−0.01+0.24 −0.28	BH	45.4+13.6 −9.6	BH	30.9+10.2 −9.6	BH	72.8+15.2 −10.3	0.69+0.10 −0.12		
GW190421_213856; 2019-04-21	2020-10-27	1000	10.7+0.2 −0.4	3150+1370 −1420	30.7+5.5 −6.6	−0.05+0.23 −0.26	BH	40.6+10.4 −6.6	BH	31.4+7.5 −8.2	BH	68.6+11.7 −8.1	0.68+0.10 −0.11	Originally designated S190421ar.	
GW190424_180648; 2019-04-24 18:06:48	2020-10-27	26000	10.4+0.2 −0.4	2550+1560 −1330	30.3+5.7 −4.2	0.15+0.22 −0.22	BH	39.5+10.9 −6.9	BH	31.0+7.4 −7.3	BH	67.1+12.5 −9.2	0.75+0.08 −0.09		
GW190425; 2019-04-25; 08:18:05	2020-01-06	430; towards Hercules	12.4+0.3 −0.4	159+69 −72	1.44+0.02 −0.02	0.012+0.01 −0.01	NS	1.60–1.87	NS	1.46–1.69	?			Originally designated S190425z (z:26th trigger|UTC day), this trigger was detected by a single LIGO instrument (of three LVC stations), and is considered by some scientists to have been confirmed as a binary neutron star merger. It was published in 2020 that a gamma-ray burst was detected (GRB 190425) ~0.5 seconds after the LIGO trigger, lasting 6 seconds and bearing similarities to GRB170817 (such as weakness [most power in sub-100 keV, or soft X-rays) bands], elevated energetic photon background levels [signal exceeding background by less than a factor of 2], and similar differences from other transients classified as short GRBs. Confidence was established for interpretation of a set of peaks through a control interval of only 2 days prior to the LIGO-Livingston trigger in INTEGRAL Electronic anticoincidence, could not be corroborated by other instruments and wasn't initially noted as a significant event. Non-detection in other instruments may be a consequence of an Earth-occulted source as the Fermi telescope attempted follow-up.	
GW190426_152155; 2019-04-26; 15:21:55	2020-10-27	1300	8.7+0.5 −0.6	370+180 −160	2.41+0.08 −0.08	−0.03+0.32 −0.30	BH?	5.7+3.9 −2.3	NS	1.5+0.8 −0.5	BH?			The primary object, being between 3.4 and 9.6 solar masses, is either a black hole or an object in the mass gap. Originally designated S230426c.	
GW190426_190642; 2019-04-26; 19:06:42	2022-05-11	4600	8.7+0.4 −0.6	4600+3400 −2300	76.0+19.1 −17.4	0.23+0.42 −0.41	BH	106+45 −24	BH	76+26 −36	BH	173+38 −34	0.77+0.14 −0.16		
GW190503_185404; 2019-05-03; 18:54:04	2020-10-27	94; towards Columba, Pictor, or Puppis	12.4+0.2 −0.3	1450+690 −630	30.2+4.2 −4.2	−0.03+0.20 −0.26	BH	43.3+9.1 −8.2	BH	28.4+7.7 −8.0	BH	68.6+8.8 −7.7	0.66+0.09 −0.12	Originally designated S230503bf.	
GW190512_180714; 2019-05-12; 18:07:14	2020-10-27	220; towards Scorpius or Ophiuchus	12.2+0.2 −0.4	1430+550 −550	14.6+1.3 −1.0	0.03+0.12 −0.13	BH	23.3+5.3 −3.8	BH	12.6+3.6 −2.5	BH	34.5+3.8 −3.5	0.65+0.07 −0.07	Originally designated S230512at.	
GW190513_205428; 2019-05-13; 20:54:28	2020-10-27	520; towards Sagittarius, Capricornus, Perseus, or Camelopardalis	12.9+0.3 −0.4	2060+880 −800	21.6+3.8 −1.9	0.11+0.28 −0.17	BH	35.7+9.5 −9.2	BH	18.0+7.7 −4.2	BH	51.6+8.2 −5.8	0.68+0.14 −0.12	Originally designated S230513bm.	
GW190514_065416; 2019-05-14; 06:54:16	2020-10-27	3000	8.2+0.3 −0.6	4100+2700 −2200	28.5+7.9 −4.8	−0.19+0.29 −0.32	BH	39.0+14.7 −8.2	BH	28.4+9.3 −8.8	BH	65+18 −10	0.63+0.11 −0.15		
GW190517_055101; 2019-05-17; 06:54:16	2020-10-27	470	10.7+0.4 −0.6	1860+1620 −840	26.6+4.0 −4.0	0.52+0.19 −0.19	BH	37.4+11.7 −7.6	BH	25.3+7.0 −7.3	BH	59.3+9.1 −8.9	0.87+0.05 −0.07	Originally designated S190517h.	
GW190519_153544; 2019-05-19; 15:35:44	2020-10-27	860	15.6+0.2 −0.3	2530+1830 −920	44.5+6.4 −7.1	0.31+0.20 −0.22	BH	66+11 −12	BH	41+11 −11	BH	101+12 −14	0.79+0.07 −0.13	Originally designated S190519bj.	
GW190521; 2019-05-21; 03:02:29	2020-09-02	765; towards Coma Berenices, Canes Venatici, or Phoenix	14.2+0.3 −0.3	5300+2400 −2600	64+13 −8	0.08+0.27 −0.36	BH	85+21 −14	BH	66+17 −18	BH	142+28 −16	0.72+0.09 −0.12	Originally designated S190521g. Largest progenitor masses to date.	
GW190521_074359; 2019-05-21; 07:43:59	2020-10-27	550	25.8+0.1 −0.2	1240+400 −570	32.1+3.2 −2.5	0.09+0.10 −0.13	BH	42.2+5.9 −4.8	BH	32.8+5.4 −6.4	BH	71.0+6.5 −4.4	0.72+0.05 −0.07	Originally designated S190521r.	
GW190527_092055; 2019-05-27; 09:20:55	2020-10-27	3700	8.1+0.3 −0.9	2500+2500 −1200	24.3+9.2 −4.1	0.11+0.28 −0.28	BH	36.5+16.4 −9.0	BH	22.6+10.5 −8.1	BH	56.4+20.2 −9.3	0.71+0.12 −0.16		
GW190602_175927; 2019-06-02; 17:59:27	2020-10-27	690	12.8+0.2 −0.3	2700+1800 −1100	49.1+9.1 −8.5	0.07+0.25 −0.24	BH	69+16 −13	BH	48+14 −17	BH	111+18 −15	0.70+0.10 −0.14	Originally designated S190602aq.	
GW190620_030421; 2019-06-20; 03:04:21	2020-10-27	7200	12.1+0.3 −0.4	2800+1700 −1300	38.3+8.3 −6.5	0.33+0.22 −0.25	BH	57+16 −13	BH	36+12 −12	BH	87+17 −12	0.79+0.08 −0.15		
GW190630_185205; 2019-06-30; 18:52:05	2020-10-27	1200	15.6+0.2 −0.3	890+560 −370	24.9+2.1 −2.1	0.10+0.12 −0.13	BH	35.1+6.9 −5.6	BH	23.7+5.2 −5.1	BH	56.4+4.4 −4.6	0.70+0.05 −0.07	Originally designated S190630ag.	
GW190701_203306; 2019-07-01; 20:33:06	2020-10-27	46; towards Eridanus or Cetus	11.3+0.2 −0.3	2060+760 −730	40.3+5.4 −4.9	−0.07+0.23 −0.29	BH	53.9+11.8 −8.0	BH	40.8+8.7 −12.0	BH	90.2+11.3 −8.9	0.66+0.09 −0.13	Originally designated S190701ah.	
GW190706_222641; 2019-07-06; 22:26:41	2020-10-27	650	12.6+0.2 −0.4	4400+2600 −1900	42.7+10.0 −7.0	0.28+0.26 −0.29	BH	67+15 −16	BH	38+15 −13	BH	99+18 −14	0.78+0.09 −0.18	Originally designated S190706ai.	
GW190707_093326; 2019-07-07; 09:33:26	2020-10-27	1300	13.3+0.2 −0.4	770+380 −270	8.5+0.7 −0.6	−0.05+0.10 −0.08	BH	11.6+3.3 −1.7	BH	8.4+1.4 −1.7	BH	19.2+1.9 −1.3	0.66+0.03 −0.04	Originally designated S190707q.	
GW190708_232457; 2019-07-08; 23:24:57	2020-10-27	14000	13.1+0.2 −0.3	880+330 −390	13.2+0.9 −0.6	0.02+0.08 −0.10	BH	17.6+4.7 −2.3	BH	13.2+2.0 −2.7	BH	29.5+2.5 −1.8	0.69+0.04 −0.04		
GW190719_215514; 2019-07-09; 21:55:14	2020-10-27	2900	8.3+0.3 −0.8	3900+2600 −2000	23.5+6.5 −4.0	0.32+0.29 −0.31	BH	37+18 −10	BH	20.8+9.0 −7.2	BH	55+17 −10	0.78+0.11 −0.17		
GW190720_000836; 2019-07-20; 00:08:36	2020-10-27	460; mostly towards Cygnus	11.0+0.3 −0.7	790+690 −320	8.9+0.5 −0.8	0.18+0.14 −0.12	BH	13.4+6.7 −3.0	BH	7.8+2.3 −2.2	BH	20.4+4.5 −2.2	0.72+0.06 −0.05	Originally designated S190720a.	
GW190725_174728; 2019-07-25; 17:47:28	2022-05-11	2200	9.1+0.4 −0.7	1030+520 −430	7.4±0.5	−0.04+0.36 −0.16	BH	11.8+10.1 −3.0	BH?	6.3+2.1 −2.5	BH	17.6+7.7 −1.8	0.65+0.09 −0.07		
GW190727_060333; 2019-07-27; 06:03:33	2020-10-27	830	11.9+0.3 −0.5	790+690 −320	28.6+5.3 −3.7	0.11+0.26 −0.25	BH	38.0+9.5 −6.2	BH	29.4+7.1 −8.4	BH	63.8+10.9 −7.5	0.73+0.10 −0.10	Originally designated S190727h.	
GW190728_064510; 2019-07-28; 06:45:10	2020-10-27	400	13.0+0.2 −0.4	870+260 −370	8.6+0.5 −0.3	0.12+0.20 −0.07	BH	12.3+7.2 −2.2	BH	8.1+1.7 −2.6	BH	19.6+4.7 −1.3	0.71+0.04 −0.04	Originally designated S190728q.	
GW190731_140936; 2019-07-31; 14:09:36	2020-10-27	3400	8.7+0.2 −0.5	3300+2400 −1700	29.5+7.1 −5.2	0.06+0.24 −0.24	BH	41.5+12.2 −9.0	BH	28.8+9.7 −9.5	BH	67+15 −11	0.70+0.10 −0.13		
GW190803_022701; 2019-08-03; 02:27:01	2020-10-27	1500	8.6+0.3 −0.5	3300+2000 −1600	27.3+5.7 −4.1	−0.03+0.24 −0.27	BH	37.3+10.6 −7.0	BH	27.3+7.8 −8.2	BH	61.7+11.8 −8.5	0.68+0.10 −0.11		
GW190805_211137; 2019-08-05; 21:11:37	2022-05-11	1600	8.1+0.5 −0.7	6100+3700 −3100	31.9+8.8 −6.3	0.37+0.29 −0.39	BH	46+15 −11	BH	31+12 −11	BH	72+18 −13	0.82+0.09 −0.16		
GW190814 2019-08-14 21:11:18	2020-06-23	18.5; towards Cetus or Sculptor	24.9+0.1 −0.2	241+41 −45	6.09+0.06 −0.06	−0.002+0.06 −0.061	BH	23.2+1.1 −1.0	MG	2.59+0.08 −0.09	BH	25.6+1.1 −0.9	0.28+0.02 −0.02	No optical counterpart was discovered despite an extensive search of the probability region. The mass of the lighter component is estimated to be 2.6 times the mass of the Sun, placing it in the mass gap between neutron stars and black holes.	
GW190828_063405; 2019-08-28; 06:34:05	2020-10-27	520	16.2+0.2 −0.3	2130+660 −930	25.0+3.4 −2.1	0.19+0.15 −0.16	BH	32.1+5.8 −4.0	BH	26.2+4.6 −4.8	BH	54.9+7.2 −4.3	0.75+0.06 −0.07	Originally designated S190828j.	
GW190828_065509; 2019-08-28; 06:55:09	2020-10-27	660	10.0+0.3 −0.5	1600+620 −600	13.3+1.2 −1.0	0.08+0.16 −0.16	BH	24.1+7.0 −7.2	BH	10.2+3.6 −2.1	BH	33.1+5.5 −4.5	0.65+0.08 −0.08	Originally designated S190828l.	
GW190909_114149; 2019-09-09; 11:41:49	2020-10-27	4700	8.1+0.4 −0.6	3800+3300 −2200	30.9+17.2 −7.5	−0.06+0.37 −0.37	BH	46+53 −13	BH	28+13 −13	BH	72+55 −17	0.66+0.15 −0.20		
GW190910_112807; 2019-09-10; 11:28:07	2020-10-27	11000	14.1+0.2 −0.3	1460+1030 −580	34.3+4.1 −4.1	0.02+0.18 −0.18	BH	43.9+7.6 −6.1	BH	35.6+6.3 −7.2	BH	75.8+8.5 −8.6	0.70+0.08 −0.07		
GW190915_235702; 2019-09-15; 23:57:02	2020-10-27	400; towards Coma Berenices, Canes Venatici, or Ursa Major	13.6+0.2 −0.3	1620+710 −610	25.3+3.2 −2.7	0.02+0.20 −0.25	BH	35.3+9.5 −6.4	BH	24.4+5.6 −6.1	BH	57.2+7.1 −6.0	0.70+0.09 −0.11	Originally designated S230915ak.	
GW190916_200658; 2019-09-16; 20:06:58	2022-05-11	2400	8.1+0.3 −0.5	4900+3700 −2400	26.9+8.2 −5.4	0.20+0.33 −0.31	BH	44+20 −13	BH	23+13 −11	BH	65+17 −13	0.74+0.13 −0.24		
GW190917_114630; 2019-09-17; 11:46:30	2022-05-11	1700	8.3+0.5 −0.8	720+300 −310	3.7±0.2	−0.08+0.21 −0.43	BH	9.7+3.4 −3.9	MG?	2.1+1.1 −0.4	BH	11.6+3.1 −2.9	0.42+0.14 −0.05		
GW190924_021846; 2019-09-24; 02:18:46	2020-10-27	360; towards Hydra or Cancer	11.5+0.3 −0.4	570+220 −220	5.8+0.2 −0.2	0.03+0.30 −0.09	BH	8.9+7.0 −2.0	BH?	5.0+1.4 −1.9	BH	13.3+5.2 −1.0	0.67+0.05 −0.05	The secondary component, being between 3.1 and 6.4 solar masses, is either a black hole or an object in the mass gap. Originally designated S230924h.	
GW190925_232845; 2019-09-25; 23:28:45	2022-05-11	2900	9.7+0.3 −0.6	930+460 −350	15.6±1.1	0.09+0.16 −0.15	BH	20.8+6.5 −2.9	BH	15.5+2.5 −3.6	BH	34.9+3.5 −2.6	0.71±0.06		
GW190926_050336; 2019-09-26; 05:03:36	2022-05-11	2000	8.1+0.6 −0.8	3300+3400 −1700	24.4+9.0 −4.9	−0.02+0.25 −0.32	BH	41+21 −13	BH	20.4+11.4 −8.2	BH	60+22 −12	0.64+0.14 −0.20		
GW190929_012149; 2019-09-29; 01:21:49	2020-10-27	2200	10.1+0.6 −0.8	2100+3700 −1100	35.8+14.9 −8.2	0.01+0.34 −0.33	BH	81+33 −33	BH	24+19 −11	BH	102+34 −25	0.66+0.20 −0.31		
GW190930_133541; 2019-09-30; 13:35:41	2020-10-27	1700	9.5+0.3 −0.5	760+360 −320	8.5+0.5 −0.5	0.14+0.31 −0.15	BH	12.3+12.4 −2.3	BH?	7.8+1.7 −3.3	BH	19.4+9.2 −1.5	0.72+0.07 −0.06	The secondary component, being between 4.5 and 9.5 solar masses, is either a black hole or an object in the mass gap. Originally designated S190930s.	
GW191103; 2019-11-03 01:25:49	2021-11-17	2500	8.9+0.3 −0.5	990+500 −470	8.34+0.66 −0.57	0.21+0.16 −0.10	BH	11.8+6.2 −2.2	BH	7.9+1.7 −2.4	BH	19.0+3.8 −1.7	0.75+0.06 −0.05		
GW191105; 2019-11-05 14:35:21	2021-11-17	640	9.7+0.3 −0.5	1150+430 −480	7.82+0.61 −0.45	−0.02+0.13 −0.09	BH	10.7+3.7 −1.6	BH	7.7+1.4 −1.9	BH	17.6+2.1 −1.2	0.67+0.04 −0.05	Originally designated S191105e.	
GW191109; 2019-11-09 01:07:17	2021-11-17	1600	17.3+0.5 −0.5	1290+1130 −650	47.5+9.6 −7.5	−0.29+0.42 −0.31	BH	65+11 −11	BH	47+15 −13	BH	107+18 −15	0.61+0.18 −0.19	Originally designated S191109d.	
GW191113; 2019-11-13 07:17:53	2021-11-17	3600	7.9+0.5 −1.1	1290+1130 −650	10.7+1.1 −1.0	0.00+0.37 −0.29	BH	29+12 −14	BH?	5.9+4.4 −1.3	BH	34+11 −10	0.45+0.33 −0.11		
GW191126; 2019-11-26 11:52:59	2021-11-17	1400	8.3+0.2 −0.5	1620+740 −740	8.65+0.95 −0.71	0.21+0.15 −0.11	BH	12.1+5.5 −2.2	BH	8.3+1.9 −2.4	BH	19.6+3.5 −2.0	0.75+0.06 −0.05		
GW191127; 2019-11-27 05:02:27	2021-11-17	980	9.2+0.7 −0.6	3400+3100 −1900	29.9+11.7 −9.1	0.18+0.34 −0.36	BH	53+47 −20	BH	24+17 −14	BH	76+31 −29	0.75+0.13 −0.29		
GW191129; 2019-11-29 13:40:29	2021-11-17	850	13.1+0.2 −0.3	790+260 −330	7.31+0.43 −0.28	0.06+0.18 −0.06	BH	10.7+4.1 −2.1	BH	6.7+1.5 −1.7	BH	16.8+2.5 −1.2	0.69+0.03 −0.05	Originally designated S191129u.	
GW191204_110529; 2019-12-04 11:05:29	2021-11-17	3700	8.8+0.4 −0.6	1800+1700 −1100	19.8+3.6 −3.3	0.05+0.26 −0.27	BH	27.3+11.0 −6.0	BH	19.3+5.6 −6.0	BH	45.0+8.6 −7.6	0.71+0.12 −0.11		
GW191204_171526; 2019-12-04 17:15:26	2021-11-17	350; towards Pictor, Caelum, or Eridanus	17.5+0.2 −0.2	650+190 −250	8.55+0.38 −0.27	0.16+0.08 −0.05	BH	11.9+3.3 −1.8	BH	8.2+1.4 −1.6	BH	19.21+1.79 −0.95	0.73+0.03 −0.03	Originally designated S191204r.	
GW191215; 2019-12-15 22:30:52	2021-11-17	530	11.2+0.3 −0.4	1930+890 −860	18.4+2.2 −1.7	−0.04+0.17 −0.21	BH	24.9+7.1 −4.1	BH	18.1+3.8 −4.1	BH	41.4+5.1 −4.1	0.68+0.07 −0.07	Originally designated S191215w.	
GW191216; 2019-12-16 21:33:38	2021-11-17	490	18.6+0.2 −0.2	340+120 −130	8.33+0.22 −0.19	0.11+0.13 −0.06	BH	12.1+4.6 −2.3	BH	7.7+1.6 −1.9	BH	18.87+2.80 −0.94	0.70+0.03 −0.04	Originally designated S191216ap.	
GW191219; 2019-12-19 16:31:20	2021-11-17	1500	9.1+0.5 −0.8	550+250 −160	4.32+0.12 −0.17	0.00+0.07 −0.09	BH	31.1+2.2 −2.8	NS	1.17+0.07 −0.06	BH	32.2+2.2 −2.7	0.14+0.06 −0.06	The event is unconfirmed due to difficulty accurately modelling the extreme mass ratio.	
GW191222; 2019-12-22 03:35:37	2021-11-17	2000	12.5+0.2 −0.3	3000+1700 −1700	33.8+7.1 −5.0	−0.04+0.20 −0.25	BH	45.1+10.9 −8.0	BH	34.7+9.3 −10.5	BH	75.5+15.3 −9.9	0.67+0.08 −0.11	Originally designated S191222n.	
GW191230; 2019-12-30 18:04:58	2021-11-17	1100	10.4+0.3 −0.4	4300+2100 −1900	36.5+8.2 −5.6	−0.05+0.26 −0.31	BH	49.4+14.0 −9.6	BH	37+11 −12	BH	82+17 −11	0.68+0.11 −0.13		
GW200105; 2020-01-05 16:24:26	2021-06-29	7200	13.7+0.2 −0.4	280±110	3.41+0.08 −0.07	−0.01+0.11 −0.15	BH	8.9+1.2 −1.5	NS	1.9+0.3 −0.2	BH	10.4+2.7 −2.0	0.43+0.04 −0.03	First event confirmed to be a black hole and neutron star merger. Originally designated S200105ae.	
GW200112; 2020-01-12 15:58:38	2021-11-17	4300	19.8+0.1 −0.2	1250+430 −460	27.4+2.6 −2.1	0.06+0.15 −0.15	BH	35.6+6.7 −4.5	BH	28.3+4.4 −5.9	BH	60.8+5.3 −4.3	0.71+0.06 −0.06	Originally designated S200112r.	
GW200114; 2020-01-14 02:08:08	2022-08-18	403; towards Gemini, Orion, or Eridanus		1250+1500 −400	68+6 −4	−0.75+0.50 −0.15	BH	78+10 −10	BH	70+10 −10	BH	140+15 −15		Originally designated S200114f. The event was initially published as an unmodeled gravitational wave burst, and different studies have offered conflicting interpretations. One study suggested it was a nearby high-mass black hole merger with component masses of 118+10 −12 and 89+18 −8 M_{sun} which was poorly modeled because of its high mass. Another study interpreted it as a somewhat smaller black hole merger taking place at the same time as a detector glitch. Both studies conclude the signal is most likely a real event, and the latter model is included in the table.	
GW200115; 2020-01-15 04:23:09	2021-06-29	600	11.3+0.3 −0.5	300+150 −100	2.42+0.05 −0.07	−0.19+0.23 −0.35	BH?	5.7+1.8 −2.1	NS	1.5+0.7 −0.3	BH	7.8+1.4 −1.6	0.38+0.04 −0.03	Second event confirmed to be a black hole and neutron star merger. Originally designated S200115j.	
GW200128; 2020-01-28 02:20:11	2021-11-17	2600	10.6+0.3 −0.4	3400+2100 −1800	32.0+7.5 −5.5	0.12+0.24 −0.25	BH	42.2+11.6 −8.1	BH	32.6+9.5 −9.2	BH	71+16 −11	0.74+0.10 −0.10	Originally designated S200128d.	
GW200129; 2020-01-29 06:54:58	2021-11-17	130; towards Equuleus, Delphinus, or Vulpecula	26.8+0.2 −0.2	900+290 −380	27.2+2.1 −2.3	0.11+0.11 −0.16	BH	34.5+9.9 −3.2	BH	28.9+3.4 −9.3	BH	60.3+4.0 −3.3	0.73+0.06 −0.05	Originally designated S200129m.	
GW200202; 2020-02-02 15:43:12	2021-11-17	170	10.8+0.2 −0.4	410+150 −160	7.49+0.24 −0.20	0.04+0.13 −0.06	BH	10.1+3.5 −1.4	BH	7.3+1.1 −1.7	BH	16.76+1.87 −0.66	0.69+0.03 −0.04		
GW200208_130117; 2020-02-08 13:01:17	2021-11-17	30; towards Pyxis or Antlia	10.8+0.3 −0.4	2230+1000 −850	27.7+3.6 −3.1	−0.07+0.22 −0.27	BH	37.8+9.2 −8.2	BH	27.5+6.1 −7.4	BH	62.5+7.3 −6.4	0.66+0.09 −0.13	Originally designated S200208q.	
GW200208_222617; 2020-02-08 22:26:17	2021-11-17	2000	7.4+1.4 −1.2	4100+4400 −1900	19.6+10.7 −5.1	0.45+0.43 −0.44	BH	51+104 −30	BH	12.3+9.0 −5.7	BH	61+100 −25	0.83+0.14 −0.27		
GW200209; 2020-02-09 08:54:52	2021-11-17	730	9.6+0.4 −0.5	3400+1900 −1800	26.7+6.0 −4.2	−0.12+0.24 −0.30	BH	35.6+10.5 −6.8	BH	27.1+7.8 −7.8	BH	59.9+13.1 −8.9	0.66+0.10 −0.12		
GW200210; 2020-02-10 09:22:54	2021-11-17	1800	8.4+0.5 −0.7	940+430 −340	6.56+0.38 −0.40	0.02+0.22 −0.21	BH	24.1+7.5 −4.6	MG	2.83+0.47 −0.42	BH	26.7+7.2 −4.3	0.34+0.13 −0.08	The secondary component, being between 2.41 and 3.30 solar masses, is an object in the mass gap.	
GW200216; 2020-02-16 22:08:04	2021-11-17	2900	8.1+0.4 −0.5	3800+3000 −2000	32.9+9.3 −8.5	0.10+0.34 −0.36	BH	51+22 −13	BH	30+14 −16	BH	78+19 −13	0.70+0.14 −0.24		
GW200219; 2020-02-19 09:44:15	2021-11-17	700	10.7+0.3 −0.5	3400+1700 −1500	27.6+5.6 −3.8	−0.08+0.23 −0.29	BH	37.5+10.1 −6.9	BH	27.9+7.4 −8.4	BH	62.2+11.7 −7.8	0.66+0.10 −0.13	Originally designated S200219ac.	
GW200220_061928; 2020-02-20 06:19:28	2021-11-17	3000	7.2+0.4 −0.7	6000+4800 −3100	62+23 −15	0.06+0.40 −0.38	BH	87+40 −23	BH	61+26 −25	BH	141+51 −31	0.71+0.15 −0.17		
GW200220_124850; 2020-02-20 12:48:50	2021-11-17	3200	8.5+0.3 −0.5	4000+2800 −2200	28.2+7.3 −5.1	−0.07+0.27 −0.33	BH	38.9+14.1 −8.6	BH	27.9+9.2 −9.0	BH	64+16 −11	0.67+0.11 −0.14		
GW200224; 2020-02-24 22:22:34	2021-11-17	50; towards Virgo or Crater	20.0+0.2 −0.2	1710+490 −640	31.1+3.2 −2.6	0.10+0.15 −0.15	BH	40.0+6.9 −4.5	BH	32.5+5.0 −7.2	BH	68.6+6.6 −4.7	0.73+0.07 −0.07	Originally designated S200224ca.	
GW200225; 2020-02-25 06:04:21	2021-11-17	370; towards Ursa Minor or Cepheus	12.5+0.3 −0.4	1150+510 −530	14.2+1.5 −1.4	−0.12+0.17 −0.28	BH	19.3+5.0 −3.0	BH	14.0+2.8 −3.5	BH	32.1+3.5 −2.8	0.66+0.07 −0.13	Originally designated S200225q.	
GW200302; 2020-03-02 01:58:11	2021-11-17	6000	10.8+0.3 −0.4	1480+1020 −700	23.4+4.7 −3.0	0.01+0.25 −0.26	BH	37.8+8.7 −8.5	BH	20.0+8.1 −5.7	BH	55.5+8.9 −8.6	0.66+0.13 −0.15	Originally designated S200302c.	
GW200306; 2020-03-06 09:37:14	2021-11-17	4600	7.8+0.4 −0.6	2100+1700 −1100	17.5+3.5 −3.0	0.32+0.28 −0.46	BH	28.3+17.1 −7.7	BH	14.8+6.5 −6.4	BH	41.7+12.3 −6.9	0.78+0.11 −0.26		
GW200308; 2020-03-08 17:36:09	2021-11-17	2000	7.1+0.5 −0.5	5400+2700 −2600	19.0+4.8 −2.8	0.65+0.21 −0.17	BH	36.4+11.2 −9.6	BH	13.8+7.2 −3.3	BH	47.4+11.1 −7.7	0.91+0.03 −0.08		
GW200311; 2020-03-11 11:58:53	2021-11-17	35; towards Cetus	17.8+0.2 −0.2	1170+280 −400	26.6+2.4 −2.0	−0.02+0.16 −0.20	BH	34.2+6.4 −3.8	BH	27.7+4.1 −5.9	BH	59.0+4.8 −3.9	0.69+0.07 −0.08	Originally designated S200311bg.	
GW200316; 2020-03-16 21:57:56	2021-11-17	190	10.3+0.4 −0.7	1120+470 −440	8.75+0.62 −0.55	0.13+0.27 −0.10	BH	13.1+10.2 −2.9	BH?	7.8+1.9 −2.9	BH	20.2+7.4 −1.9	0.70+0.04 −0.04	Originally designated S200316bj.	
GW200322; 2020-03-22 09:11:33	2021-11-17	6500	6.0+1.7 −1.2	3600+7000 −2000	15.5+15.7 −3.7	0.24+0.45 −0.51	BH	34+48 −18	BH	14.0+16.8 −8.7	BH	53+38 −26	0.78+0.16 −0.17		
GW230518; 2023-05-18 12:59:08	2025-08-25	490	14.2+0.2 −0.4	237+108 −98	2.80±0.06	−0.01+0.09 −0.11	BH	8.17+0.84 −0.92	NS	1.45+0.13 −0.10	BH	9.46+0.76 −0.80	0.38±0.03	Originally designated S230518h.	
GW230529 2023-05-29 18:15:00	2024-04-05	24000	11.6+0.3 −0.4	201+103 −96	1.94+0.04 −0.04	−0.1+0.12 −0.18	MG	3.66+0.82 −1.21	NS	1.42+0.60 −0.22	BH?	4.92+0.62 −0.63	0.58+0.08 −0.06	Originally designated S230529ay. Was detected using only the LIGO Livingston detector. It provides strong support for the primary object to be within the mass gap.	
GW230601 2023-06-01 22:41:34	2025-08-25	3300	12.3+0.2 −0.3	600+280 −260	45.0+10.0 −7.3	−0.03+0.27 −0.32	BH	64+17 −13	BH	44+14 −15	BH	102+21 −14	0.67+0.12 −0.13	Originally designated S230601bf.	
GW230605 2023-06-05 06:53:43	2025-08-25	1000	10.5+0.3 −0.4	1100+600 −500	11.9+1.0 −0.9	0.06+0.16 −0.10	BH	17.2+6.5 −3.5	BH	11.1+2.5 −2.7	BH	27.3+4.1 −2.7	0.69±0.05	Originally designated S230605o.	
GW230606 2023-06-06 00:43:05	2025-08-25	1400	10.3+0.3 −0.4	2700+1500 −1400	26.5+5.7 −3.6	−0.10±0.30	BH	37.6+13.4 −7.6	BH	25.8+8.1 −8.3	BH	60.7+12.8 −7.9	0.64+0.11 −0.14	Originally designated S230606d.	
GW230608 2023-06-08 20:50:47	2025-08-25	2200	9.8+0.3 −0.5	3500+2200 −1700	32.8+7.3 −5.4	−0.04+0.25 −0.26	BH	48+13 −11	BH	31+11 −10	BH	75+15 −11	0.69+0.11 −0.14	Originally designated S230608as.	
GW230609 2023-06-09 06:49:58	2025-08-25	1700	9.8+0.3 −0.5	3400+1900 −1700	25.5+5.8 −3.6	−0.10+0.20 −0.30	BH	35.3+10.7 −6.9	BH	25.2±7.5	BH	57.8+12.2 −7.7	0.64+0.09 −0.13	Originally designated S230609u.	
GW230624 2023-06-24 11:31:03	2025-08-25	1300	9.7+0.4 −0.5	1900+1300 −1000	18.0+3.2 −2.4	0.20±0.30	BH	27.2+13.4 −6.9	BH	16.1+4.8 −4.5	BH	41.8+10.7 −6.3	0.72+0.12 −0.11	Originally designated S230624av.	
GW230627 2023-06-27 01:53:37	2025-08-25	110	28.5±0.1	310+60 −130	6.02+0.16 −0.07	0.02+0.08 −0.03	BH	8.37+1.67 −1.26	BH?	5.79+0.95 −0.92	BH	13.5+0.8 −0.5	0.68+0.02 −0.03	Originally designated S230627c.	
GW230628 2023-06-28 23:12:00	2025-08-25	660	15.5+0.2 −0.3	2300+800 −1100	25.5+3.8 −2.2	−0.01±0.16	BH	32.5+5.9 −3.9	BH	27.1+4.9 −5.2	BH	56.5+8.1 −4.6	0.69+0.08 −0.06	Originally designated S230628ax.	
GW230630_125806 2023-06-30 12:58:06	2025-08-25	4300	8.1+0.4 −0.5	5400+5100 −3000	35.0+11.4 −8.5	0.20±0.30	BH	51+20 −14	BH	33+15 −13	BH	80+25 −18	0.75+0.11 −0.16	Originally designated S230630am.	
GW230630_234532 2023-06-30 23:45:32	2025-08-25	1500	9.4+0.3 −0.5	1100±500	7.06+0.57 −0.48	−0.04+0.16 −0.08	BH	10.0+3.5 −1.8	BH	6.64+1.46 −1.59	BH	16.1+2.1 −1.4	0.66+0.04 −0.05	Originally designated S230630bq.	
GW230702 2023-07-02 18:54:53	2025-08-25	2500	9.5+0.3 −0.5	2400+1900 −1100	22.9+4.0 −3.5	0.05+0.29 −0.26	BH	40+20 −13	BH	18.0+8.5 −6.5	BH	57+15 −11	0.64+0.13 −0.15	Originally designated S230702an.	
GW230704_021211 2023-07-04 02:12:11	2025-08-25	1500	9.0+0.3 −0.5	2700+1800 −1500	21.8+4.4 −3.2	−0.01+0.21 −0.24	BH	32.4+11.9 −7.9	BH	19.9+6.5 −6.0	BH	50.5+10.6 −7.9	0.66+0.10 −0.13	Originally designated S230704f.	
GW230704_212616 2023-07-04 21:26:16	2025-08-25	7400	8.0+1.0 −1.0	7200+6100 −4200	55+23 −14	0.30+0.30 −0.40	BH	89+42 −27	BH	49+30 −25	BH	132+47 −30	0.77+0.12 −0.19	Originally designated S230704bd.	
GW230706 2023-07-06 10:43:33	2025-08-25	1500	9.0+0.3 −0.5	1900+900 −1000	11.8+1.7 −1.1	0.20±0.10	BH	16.3+5.4 −3.0	BH	11.5+2.6 −2.7	BH	26.5+4.3 −2.8	0.75+0.07 −0.06	Originally designated S230706ah.	
GW230707 2023-07-07 12:40:47	2025-08-25	3200	10.6+0.2 −0.4	4500±2300	35.1+8.6 −5.3	−0.05+0.25 −0.29	BH	46.1+12.2 −8.2	BH	36.4+10.6 −9.8	BH	78+18 −11	0.68+0.09 −0.10	Originally designated S230707ai.	
GW230708_053705 2023-07-08 05:37:05	2025-08-25	1900	8.3+0.4 −0.6	3300+2000 −1700	22.2+4.4 −3.3	0.07+0.23 −0.24	BH	29.1+8.2 −5.4	BH	22.8+5.5 −5.4	BH	49.4+9.7 −7.2	0.72±0.09	Originally designated S230708t.	
GW230708_230935 2023-07-08 23:09:35	2025-08-25	2600	9.2+0.3 −0.5	3500+2300 −1600	42.5+9.7 −7.8	0.01+0.27 −0.30	BH	64+20 −15	BH	39+14 −15	BH	98+20 −15	0.67+0.12 −0.16	Originally designated S230708cf.	
GW230709 2023-07-09 12:27:27	2025-08-25	3600	8.5+0.3 −0.5	4600+3500 −2400	31.0+9.4 −6.6	0.08+0.30 −0.31	BH	45+16 −11	BH	30±13	BH	71+19 −13	0.71+0.12 −0.15	Originally designated S230709bi.	
GW230712 2023-07-12 09:04:05	2025-08-25	1400	8.0±1.0	2000+2600 −1000	16.5+11.1 −3.2	−0.03+0.35 −0.31	BH	32+17 −10	BH	13.1+14.6 −5.9	BH	45+20 −11	0.66+0.17 −0.22	Originally designated S230712aj.	
GW230723 2023-07-23 10:18:34	2025-08-25	1100	9.7+0.3 −0.5	1600+700 −900	11.4+1.6 −0.9	−0.20±0.20	BH	16.7+5.9 −3.4	BH	10.6±2.8	BH	26.4+4.2 −2.6	0.61+0.09 −0.08	Originally designated S230723ac.	
GW230726 2023-07-26 00:29:40	2025-08-25	28000	10.2+0.2 −0.4	2000+1200 −1000	27.3+4.4 −3.4	−0.02+0.21 −0.23	BH	35.6+9.0 −5.9	BH	27.9±6.0	BH	60.6+9.7 −7.4	0.69±0.08	Originally designated S230726a.	
GW230729 2023-07-29 08:23:17	2025-08-25	2200	8.2+0.3 −0.6	1600±800	8.33+0.94 −0.75	0.10+0.20 −0.10	BH	12.3+7.6 −2.7	BH	7.62+2.12 −2.63	BH	19.4+5.1 −2.4	0.71±0.06	Originally designated S230729z.	
GW230731 2023-07-31 21:53:07	2025-08-25	710	11.9+0.2 −0.3	1100+300 −500	7.77+0.58 −0.36	−0.05+0.11 −0.06	BH	10.4+2.9 −1.4	BH	7.80+1.24 −1.64	BH	17.4+1.6 −1.0	0.67+0.04 −0.03	Originally designated S230731an.	
GW230803 2023-08-03 03:34:12	2025-08-25	4100	7.7+0.4 −0.6	4900+4000 −2600	30.5+9.3 −6.7	0.06+0.29 −0.31	BH	45+19 −12	BH	28+12 −10	BH	70+21 −15	0.71+0.12 −0.14	Originally designated S230803d.	
GW230805 2023-08-05 03:42:49	2025-08-25	2400	9.0+0.3 −0.5	3500+2600 −1700	23.1+5.9 −4.2	0.06+0.27 −0.28	BH	32.1+12.5 −7.3	BH	22.6+7.8 −7.5	BH	52.4+13.0 −9.2	0.71+0.11 −0.12	Originally designated S230805x.	
GW230806 2023-08-06 20:40:41	2025-08-25	4600	8.5+0.3 −0.5	5500+3700 −2900	35.8+10.7 −6.9	0.08+0.28 −0.27	BH	51+18 −12	BH	35+14 −13	BH	81+23 −15	0.71+0.11 −0.13	Originally designated S230806ak.	
GW230811 2023-08-11 03:21:16	2025-08-25	940	12.8+0.3 −0.4	2100+1200 −1100	24.0+4.1 −2.4	0.02±0.18	BH	35.6+8.7 −7.5	BH	22.1+6.7 −5.1	BH	55.3+8.3 −6.4	0.69±0.09	Originally designated S230811n.	
GW230814_061920 2023-08-14 06:19:20	2025-08-25	5200	9.4+0.3 −0.5	4000+3400 −2000	45.5+11.9 −9.9	0.05+0.29 −0.28	BH	69+19 −17	BH	42+17 −16	BH	105+24 −19	0.69+0.12 −0.14	Originally designated S230814r.	
GW230814_230901 2023-08-14 23:09:01	2025-08-25	26000	42.1±0.1	280+170 −130	26.7+0.9 −1.0	−0.01+0.06 −0.08	BH	33.6+2.8 −2.2	BH	28.3+2.1 −3.0	BH	58.9±1.9	0.68+0.02 −0.03	Originally designated S230814ah.	
GW230819 2023-08-19 17:19:10	2025-08-25	4800	8.9+0.4 −0.5	4000+3900 −2200	42+14 −11	−0.04+0.36 −0.43	BH	70+47 −21	BH	35+20 −19	BH	102+41 −22	0.64+0.19 −0.25	Originally designated S230819ax.	
GW230820 2023-08-20 21:25:15	2025-08-25	2100	8.4+0.4 −0.5	4000+3000 −2100	38.6+11.2 −9.8	0.20±0.30	BH	62+23 −15	BH	34±18	BH	92+21 −16	0.74+0.12 −0.25	Originally designated S230820bq.	
GW230824 2023-08-24 03:30:47	2025-08-25	3700	10.0+0.2 −0.4	4700+2900 −2300	37.0+9.1 −6.3	0.00+0.23 −0.27	BH	52+16 −12	BH	36+12 −13	BH	84+19 −13	0.68+0.10 −0.13	Originally designated S230824r.	
GW230825 2023-08-25 04:13:34	2025-08-25	3400	8.1+0.5 −0.6	4900+4200 −2900	29.4+9.4 −6.3	0.30+0.20 −0.30	BH	43+17 −12	BH	27.3+11.9 −8.9	BH	67+20 −15	0.79+0.08 −0.15	Originally designated S230825k.	
GW230831 2023-08-31 01:54:14	2025-08-25	4000	8.1+0.3 −0.7	4900+4200 −2900	30.7+10.6 −6.5	0.03±0.30	BH	42+18 −12	BH	30+12 −10	BH	69+24 −14	0.71±0.12	Originally designated S230831e.	
GW230904 2023-09-04 05:10:13	2025-08-25	1800	10.2+0.3 −0.5	1000+600 −400	7.54+0.53 −0.60	0.05+0.17 −0.07	BH	10.6+4.1 −1.9	BH	7.12+1.52 −1.88	BH	17.1+2.5 −1.6	0.69±0.04	Originally designated S230904n.	
GW230911 2023-09-11 19:53:24	2025-08-25	27000	10.6+0.3 −0.4	1400+1200 −700	23.1+3.4 −3.0	−0.03+0.19 −0.23	BH	33.6+8.1 −7.3	BH	21.7+5.6 −5.7	BH	53.0+7.4 −6.7	0.67+0.09 −0.11	Originally designated S230911ae.	
GW230914 2023-09-14 11:14:01	2025-08-25	1900	16.2+0.2 −0.3	2700+1600 −1200	39.6+7.5 −6.2	0.10±0.20	BH	59+12 −11	BH	36+13 −12	BH	90.9+14.0 −9.7	0.71+0.09 −0.14	Originally designated S230914ak.	
GW230919 2023-09-19 21:57:12	2025-08-25	730	15.7+0.2 −0.3	1300+800 −500	21.0+1.8 −1.9	0.20±0.10	BH	27.3+5.5 −3.7	BH	21.4+3.5 −4.3	BH	46.5+3.9 −4.3	0.75+0.06 −0.05	Originally designated S230919bj.	
GW230920 2023-09-20 07:11:24	2025-08-25	2100	10.1+0.3 −0.4	2900+1800 −1400	23.9+4.6 −3.4	0.00+0.22 −0.23	BH	32.4+9.1 −6.2	BH	23.8+6.6 −6.9	BH	53.9+9.6 −7.6	0.69±0.10	Originally designated S230920al.	
GW230922_020344 2023-09-22 02:03:44	2025-08-25	330; towards Piscis Austrinus or Aquarius	11.8+0.3 −0.4	1600±700	29.2+3.6 −2.6	0.03+0.20 −0.21	BH	39.3+10.0 −6.3	BH	29.2+5.6 −6.2	BH	65.4+8.4 −6.1	0.70±0.08	Originally designated S230922g.	
GW230922_040658 2023-09-22 04:06:58	2025-08-25	5100	11.4+0.2 −0.4	6400+4100 −3500	52+17 −12	0.30±0.30	BH	76+28 −18	BH	51+23 −24	BH	119+34 −21	0.79+0.08 −0.14	Originally designated S230922q.	
GW230924 2023-09-24 12:44:53	2025-08-25	1300	12.9+0.2 −0.3	2400±1000	22.3+3.1 −2.1	0.02±0.18	BH	28.8+5.9 −4.0	BH	23.1±4.4	BH	49.3+6.6 −4.6	0.70+0.07 −0.06	Originally designated S230924an.	
GW230927_043729 2023-09-27 04:37:29	2025-08-25	1500	10.5+0.2 −0.4	3300±1700	26.5+5.5 −3.5	0.01+0.20 −0.22	BH	34.9+8.7 −6.1	BH	27.1+7.2 −6.5	BH	58.9+11.9 −7.6	0.69±0.08	Originally designated S230927l.	
GW230927_153832 2023-09-27 15:38:32	2025-08-25	330	19.7±0.2	1200+400 −500	16.4+1.4 −0.8	0.03±0.08	BH	21.9+3.7 −2.9	BH	16.5+2.6 −2.5	BH	36.5+3.1 −2.1	0.69+0.04 −0.03	Originally designated S230927be.	
GW230928 2023-09-28 21:58:27	2025-08-25	3700	8.9+0.4 −0.6	5000+3900 −2500	33.6+9.9 −7.5	0.40+0.20 −0.30	BH	54+19 −15	BH	29+14 −11	BH	79+21 −17	0.83+0.07 −0.15	Originally designated S230928cb.	
GW230930 2023-09-30 11:07:30	2025-08-25	3300	8.0+0.3 −0.5	4900+3200 −2500	24.9+6.3 −4.2	0.03+0.26 −0.27	BH	34.4+12.9 −7.8	BH	24.4+8.3 −7.4	BH	56.3+14.2 −9.7	0.69+0.10 −0.12	Originally designated S230930al.	
GW231001 2023-10-01 14:02:20	2025-08-25	4300	9.6+0.3 −0.5	4400+3800 −2400	46.4+14.3 −9.9	−0.04+0.32 −0.35	BH	75+26 −22	BH	40+18 −16	BH	111+31 −21	0.64+0.15 −0.20	Originally designated S231001aq.	
GW231004 2023-10-04 23:23:46	2025-08-25	3500	8.2+0.3 −0.6	4300+3600 −2200	40.1+11.7 −8.5	−0.05+0.30 −0.37	BH	65+24 −19	BH	35+16 −14	BH	96+26 −19	0.64+0.14 −0.19	Originally designated S231004bq.	
GW231005_021030 2023-10-05 02:10:30	2025-08-25	5600	9.4+0.3 −0.4	6400+4700 −3300	54+17 −12	0.10+0.35 −0.37	BH	83+31 −22	BH	49+22 −20	BH	126+35 −24	0.72+0.14 −0.17	Originally designated S231005j.	
GW231005_091549 2023-10-05 09:15:49	2025-08-25	2900	8.0+0.3 −0.6	3800+2600 −1900	21.3+4.8 −3.5	−0.03+0.23 −0.26	BH	28.8+10.1 −6.1	BH	21.2+6.4 −6.1	BH	48.0+10.8 −7.9	0.68+0.10 −0.11	Originally designated S231005ah.	
GW231008 2023-10-08 14:25:21	2025-08-25	3000	8.9+0.4 −0.5	3000+2500 −1300	28.9+6.8 −5.6	−0.01+0.26 −0.28	BH	45+17 −12	BH	25.5+10.7 −9.7	BH	68+15 −13	0.66+0.13 −0.19	Originally designated S231008ap.	
GW231014 2023-10-14 04:05:32	2025-08-25	1800	8.7+0.4 −0.5	2300+1400 −1200	15.0+2.7 −1.9	0.20±0.30	BH	20.6+7.8 −4.0	BH	14.7+3.9 −4.3	BH	33.8+6.6 −4.3	0.75+0.10 −0.11	Originally designated S231014r.	
GW231018 2023-10-18 23:30:37	2025-08-25	1600	8.2+0.3 −0.6	1500+800 −700	7.90+0.88 −0.68	0.01+0.17 −0.13	BH	11.6+4.9 −2.5	BH	7.23+1.87 −2.00	BH	18.2+3.3 −2.0	0.67+0.05 −0.07	Originally designated S231018by.	
GW231020 2023-10-20 14:29:47	2025-08-25	1500	10.5+0.3 −0.4	1200+500 −600	8.06+0.81 −0.53	0.10+0.30 −0.10	BH	12.1+9.1 −2.7	BH?	7.30+2.06 −2.85	BH	18.9+6.3 −2.0	0.72+0.06 −0.04	Originally designated S231020ba.	
GW231028 2023-10-28 15:30:06	2025-08-25	1300	21.0±0.2	4100+1400 −1900	63+13 −10	0.40±0.20	BH	95+33 −20	BH	58+21 −25	BH	144+27 −14	0.84+0.05 −0.10	Originally designated S231028bg.	
GW231029 2023-10-29 11:15:08	2025-08-25	29000	11.2+0.2 −0.3	3100+2400 −1700	44.2+10.5 −8.0	0.10±0.20	BH	65+17 −14	BH	42+15 −16	BH	101+21 −15	0.72+0.10 −0.15	Originally designated S231029y.	
GW231102 2023-11-02 07:17:36	2025-08-25	3000	13.3+0.2 −0.3	3800+2100 −1800	43.4+9.3 −6.3	0.06+0.23 −0.22	BH	61+14 −12	BH	43±13	BH	98+19 −12	0.70+0.09 −0.10	Originally designated S231102w.	
GW231104 2023-11-04 13:34:18	2025-08-25	1100	11.0+0.2 −0.4	1500+500 −700	8.84+0.87 −0.56	0.10±0.10	BH	12.3+4.5 −2.1	BH	8.56+1.79 −2.16	BH	20.0+2.8 −1.7	0.72+0.05 −0.04	Originally designated S231104ac.	
GW231108 2023-11-08 12:51:42	2025-08-25	1000	12.4+0.2 −0.3	2100+700 −900	17.3+2.1 −1.3	−0.08+0.13 −0.15	BH	23.2+5.5 −3.6	BH	17.4+3.2 −3.1	BH	38.8+4.9 −3.2	0.66+0.06 −0.05	Originally designated S231108u.	
GW231110 2023-11-10 04:03:20	2025-08-25	800	11.0+0.3 −0.4	1900±900	13.4+1.7 −1.2	0.20±0.10	BH	19.5+5.8 −4.1	BH	12.5+3.1 −2.9	BH	30.6+4.2 −3.3	0.74+0.06 −0.05	Originally designated S231110g.	
GW231113_122623 2023-11-13 12:26:23	2025-08-25	2800	7.8+0.4 −0.7	3400+2400 −1700	27.9+6.3 −5.5	0.30+0.20 −0.30	BH	39.7+17.3 −9.6	BH	26.4+9.0 −9.4	BH	63+15 −12	0.81+0.08 −0.16	Originally designated S231113bb.	
GW231113_200417 2023-11-13 20:04:17	2025-08-25	1600	10.1+0.3 −0.5	1200+600 −500	8.01+0.68 −0.64	0.10±0.10	BH	11.5+5.1 −2.3	BH	7.41+1.76 −2.00	BH	18.3+3.2 −1.9	0.72+0.06 −0.04	Originally designated S231113bw.	
GW231114 2023-11-14 04:32:11	2025-08-25	1700	9.8+0.3 −0.5	1400+900 −600	11.6±1.1	0.08+0.22 −0.16	BH	22.7+9.6 −6.4	BH	8.20+2.56 −2.18	BH	30.0+7.8 −4.8	0.61±0.06	Originally designated S231114n.	
GW231118_005626 2023-11-18 00:56:26	2025-08-25	1100	10.5+0.3 −0.5	2200+900 −1000	12.6+1.6 −1.1	0.40±0.10	BH	19.8+6.6 −4.9	BH	10.9+3.3 −2.4	BH	29.3+5.3 −3.6	0.80+0.06 −0.05	Originally designated S231118d.	
GW231118_071402 2023-11-18 07:14:02	2025-08-25	3600	8.5+0.3 −0.5	4300+3500 −2200	30.4+7.9 −6.1	0.10±0.30	BH	43+15 −10	BH	30±10	BH	69+17 −13	0.72+0.11 −0.14	Originally designated S231118ab.	
GW231118_090602 2023-11-18 09:06:02	2025-08-25	1100	10.9±0.4	1400+500 −600	8.37+0.76 −0.56	0.08+0.36 −0.09	BH	13.1+13.7 −3.3	BH?	7.29+2.13 −3.27	BH	19.7+10.6 −2.3	0.70+0.08 −0.04	Originally designated S231118an.	
GW231119 2023-11-19 07:52:48	2025-08-25	5900	7.7+0.3 −0.5	6700+5500 −3700	34.4+12.4 −7.8	0.00+0.28 −0.30	BH	49+23 −13	BH	34+15 −13	BH	79+27 −18	0.68+0.11 −0.16	Originally designated S231119u.	
GW231123 2023-11-23 13:54:30	2025-07-10	1700	20.7+0.2 −0.3	2200+2000 −1500	137+23 −18	0.30+0.20 −0.40	BH	137+23 −18	BH	101+22 −51	BH	222+27 −42	0.84+0.07 −0.19	Originally designated S231123cg. The most massive black hole merger detected as of July 2025	
GW231127 2023-11-27 16:53:00	2025-08-25	4400	8.3+0.3 −0.5	4500+3600 −2500	30.5+9.5 −6.7	0.05+0.30 −0.32	BH	45+18 −12	BH	29±12	BH	71+21 −14	0.69+0.12 −0.17	Originally designated S231127cg.	
GW231129 2023-11-29 08:17:45	2025-08-25	3700	7.5+0.4 −0.7	3800+3600 −2100	27.7+7.7 −5.7	0.02+0.27 −0.26	BH	45+15 −12	BH	23.8+10.0 −8.2	BH	66+17 −14	0.67+0.13 −0.16	Originally designated S231129ac.	
GW231206_233134 2023-12-06 23:31:34	2025-08-25	2400	11.0+0.3 −0.4	3200±1800	27.2+5.9 −3.9	−0.09+0.22 −0.24	BH	35.6+9.1 −6.3	BH	28.1+7.5 −7.1	BH	60.6+12.7 −8.4	0.67+0.09 −0.10	Originally designated S231206ca.	
GW231206_233901 2023-12-06 23:39:01	2025-08-25	350	21.0+0.1 −0.2	1500+300 −500	28.1+2.7 −1.7	−0.05+0.14 −0.15	BH	37.6+6.6 −4.6	BH	28.4+5.4 −6.0	BH	63.1+5.0 −3.4	0.67+0.06 −0.07	Originally designated S231206cc.	
GW231213 2023-12-13 11:14:17	2025-08-25	2600	9.7+0.2 −0.4	4000+2300 −2000	26.7+6.3 −4.2	0.06+0.24 −0.23	BH	35.5+10.3 −6.7	BH	27.2+8.1 −7.5	BH	59.5+13.4 −8.8	0.71±0.09	Originally designated S231213ap.	
GW231221 2023-12-21 13:50:41	2025-08-25	3700	7.8+0.4 −0.6	4600+3700 −2500	30.7+9.5 −6.8	0.01+0.36 −0.38	BH	47+21 −13	BH	28±13	BH	72+20 −15	0.69+0.15 −0.17	Originally designated S231221ax.	
GW231223_032836 2023-12-23 03:28:36	2025-08-25	4200	8.8+0.3 −0.5	4200+3100 −2100	31.8+8.6 −7.0	−0.20+0.30 −0.40	BH	46+16 −11	BH	31+12 −14	BH	73+17 −13	0.63+0.13 −0.17	Originally designated S231223j.	
GW231223_075055 2023-12-23 07:50:55	2025-08-25	1500	8.8+0.4 −0.6	970+580 −430	7.79+0.58 −0.59	0.06+0.22 −0.12	BH	11.9+6.8 −2.8	BH	6.80+2.00 −2.13	BH	18.1+4.8 −1.9	0.69+0.06 −0.05	Originally designated S231223aa.	
GW231223_202619 2023-12-23 20:26:19	2025-08-25	27000	9.8+0.2 −0.4	890+490 −440	8.36+0.66 −0.57	0.10+0.13 −0.11	BH	11.1+3.8 −1.6	BH	8.33+1.36 −1.93	BH	18.7+2.2 −1.5	0.71±0.05	Originally designated S231223bg.	
GW231224 2023-12-24 02:43:21	2025-08-25	390	12.9+0.2 −0.3	950+290 −400	7.13+0.48 −0.29	−0.01+0.08 −0.06	BH	9.31+2.20 −1.09	BH	7.30+1.01 −1.33	BH	15.9+1.3 −0.8	0.68+0.04 −0.03	Originally designated S231224e.	
GW231226 2023-12-26 10:15:20	2025-08-25	190	33.7±0.1	1200+200 −400	32.4+1.8 −1.4	−0.09+0.09 −0.10	BH	40.1+4.4 −2.9	BH	35.0+3.2 −4.9	BH	71.4+3.8 −2.8	0.67±0.04	Originally designated S231226av.	
GW231230 2023-12-30 17:01:16	2025-08-25	6700	7.4+0.4 −0.7	5700+4800 −3200	36.9+14.3 −8.4	−0.20+0.30 −0.40	BH	54+50 −15	BH	35+15 −14	BH	86+47 −19	0.62+0.13 −0.20	Originally designated S231230ar.	
GW231231 2023-12-31 15:40:16	2025-08-25	27000	13.1+0.2 −0.3	1100+600 −500	17.1+1.6 −1.4	−0.03±0.12	BH	22.5+5.7 −3.3	BH	17.2+2.9 −3.2	BH	38.1+4.0 −3.2	0.67+0.06 −0.05	Originally designated S231231ag.	
GW240104 2024-01-04 16:49:32	2025-08-25	28000	14.1+0.2 −0.3	1900+1000 −1000	31.8+5.1 −3.9	0.09±0.19	BH	42.3+9.4 −6.7	BH	32.1+7.5 −8.0	BH	70.6+10.7 −7.9	0.73±0.08	Originally designated S240104bl.	
GW240107 2024-01-07 01:32:15	2025-08-25	4800	8.5+0.4 −0.5	5800+4800 −3200	36.2+14.0 −9.5	0.30+0.30 −0.40	BH	59+27 −18	BH	32+20 −16	BH	87+28 −19	0.79+0.10 −0.19	Originally designated S240107b.	
GW240109 2024-01-09 05:04:31	2025-08-25	27000	10.4+0.2 −0.4	1500+1000 −800	19.6+2.7 −2.2	−0.07+0.20 −0.23	BH	28.8+7.5 −6.2	BH	18.1+4.8 −4.1	BH	45.1+6.5 −5.5	0.64±0.09	Originally designated S240109a.	
GW240413 2024-04-13 02:20:19	2026-05-22	37; towards Leo or Sextans	17.3±0.2	570+110 −220	5.74+0.23 −0.11	0.07+0.14 −0.04	BH	7.9+2.8 −1.2	BH?	5.57+0.96 −1.35	BH	12.92+1.49 −0.52	0.70+0.03 −0.04	Originally designated S240413p.	
GW24014 2024-04-14 05:45:15	2026-05-22	270	10.7+0.2 −0.4	1530+680 −580	27.1+3.6 −2.8	0.03+0.22 −0.21	BH	38.8+12.1 −7.2	BH	25.9+6.9 −8.1	BH	62.2+8.0 −6.0	0.69+0.11 −0.12		
GW240420 2024-04-20 17:56:25	2026-05-22	28000	9.5+0.2 −0.4	2000+1600 −1100	24.7+4.6 −3.8	0.00+0.23 −0.25	BH	34.6+10.0 −7.2	BH	23.8+7.2 −7.1	BH	56.0+9.8 −8.3	0.68+0.10 −0.11	Originally designated S240420dc.	
GW240426 2024-04-26 03:14:51	2026-05-22	3200	9.1+0.3 −0.5	4000+2600 −2000	37.1+8.2 −6.3	−0.05+0.24 −0.28	BH	52+14 −11	BH	37.1+8.2 −6.3	BH	84+17 −13	0.67+0.11 −0.13	Originally designated S240426s.	
GW240428 2024-04-28 22:54:40	2026-05-22	200	15.6+0.2 −0.3	840+200 −280	14.72+0.72 −0.48	0.03+0.10 −0.08	BH	19.8+4.9 −2.6	BH	14.7+2.2 −2.9	BH	33.0+2.3 −1.4	0.69±0.04	Originally designated S240428dr.	
GW240501 2024-05-01 03:35:34	2026-05-22	1700	9.7+0.4 −0.5	4700+2700 −2200	28.0+6.4 −4.4	0.04+0.26 −0.28	BH	38.6+11.6 −8.0	BH	27.7+8.6 −8.2	BH	63.1+13.4 −9.5	0.70+0.10 −0.12	Originally designated S240501an.	
GW240505 2024-05-05 13:35:52	2026-05-22	2100	8.2+0.3 −0.6	4700+2600 −2100	23.0+5.3 −3.4	−0.13+0.25 −0.30	BH	31.0+9.2 −5.9	BH	23.1+6.8 −6.7	BH	51.8+11.3 −7.3	0.65+0.10 −0.13	Originally designated S240505av.	
GW240507 2024-05-07 04:16:32	2026-05-22	680	9.7+0.5 −0.7	1450+900 −500	13.8+1.9 −1.4	0.01+0.20 −0.23	BH	31.3+9.2 −11.6	BH	8.5+6.3 −1.9	BH	38.9+8.0 −7.2	0.55+0.19 −0.13	Originally designated S240507p.	
GW240511 2024-05-11 03:15:07	2026-05-22	120; towards Crater or Hydra	15.6+0.2 −0.3	1990+750 −760	31.1+3.3 −2.6	0.05+0.17 −0.16	BH	40.5+7.4 −5.1	BH	32.2+5.5 −6.6	BH	69.1+6.8 −5.5	0.71±0.07	Originally designated S240511i.	
GW240512 2024-05-12 02:41:39	2026-05-22	190	10.8+0.3 −0.5	1170+340 −490	8.62+0.65 −0.39	0.14+0.13 −0.07	BH	12.6+4.8 −2.5	BH	8.0+1.8 −2.1	BH	19.7+3.0 −1.5	0.72+0.06 −0.04	Originally designated S240512r.	
GW240513 2024-05-13 18:33:02	2026-05-22	33; towards Auriga or Perseus	13.6+0.2 −0.4	2250+690 −800	17.4+1.8 −1.1	0.14+0.13 −0.14	BH	24.4+6.0 −4.2	BH	16.9±3.6	BH	39.4+4.2 −3.1	0.74±0.06	Originally designated S240513ei.	
GW240514 2024-05-14 12:17:13	2026-05-22	190; mostly towards Reticulum	16.2+0.2 −0.3	2590+820 −1040	35.4+5.2 −3.7	0.01+0.17 −0.18	BH	46.8+9.3 −6.3	BH	36.7+7.5 −10.6	BH	78.9+10.4 −6.3	0.69+0.08 −0.09	Originally designated S240514x.	
GW240515 2024-05-15 00:53:01	2026-05-22	1700	10.3+0.3 −0.4	3800+1800 −1900	22.4+4.8 −2.7	0.47+0.17 −0.19	BH	37.1+11.4 −9.9	BH	18.5+8.9 −4.5	BH	53.2+10.3 −8.0	0.84+0.06 −0.09	Originally designated S240515m.	
GW240519 2024-05-19 01:28:15	2026-05-22	2300	10.6+0.4 −0.6	1740+1830 −820	43.1+8.3 −9.3	−0.04+0.26 −0.31	BH	65+19 −16	BH	39+13 −16	BH	100+17 −18	0.65+0.11 −0.15		
GW240520 2024-05-20 21:36:16	2026-05-22	350; towards Ursa Major, Indus, or Tucana	10.5+0.3 −0.5	1400+530 −500	8.28+0.62 −0.52	0.00+0.12 −0.08	BH	11.4+3.6 −1.9	BH	8.0+1.5 −1.8	BH	18.7+2.1 −1.4	0.67±0.04	Originally designated S240520cv.	
GW240525 2024-05-25 03:12:10	2026-05-22	2000	8.0+0.5 −0.7	4500+3000 −2200	22.1+5.2 −3.8	0.17+0.25 −0.26	BH	31.1+12.1 −7.2	BH	21.4+7.1 −6.8	BH	50.2+11.7 −8.8	0.75+0.10 −0.13	Originally designated S240525p.	
GW240526 2024-05-26 09:39:44	2026-05-22	900	8.4+0.5 −0.7	1940+1100 −940	9.5+1.3 −1.0	0.22+0.14 −0.12	BH	14.5+6.1 −3.6	BH	8.4+2.5 −2.3	BH	22.1+4.4 −3.1	0.76+0.08 −0.06	Originally designated S240526ak.	
GW240527_183429 2024-05-27 18:34:29	2026-05-22	1100	9.4+0.3 −0.5	6400+3500 −3100	34.5+10.8 −6.7	0.31+0.27 −0.33	BH	52+17 −12	BH	33±15	BH	80+20 −12	0.79+0.09 −0.16	Originally designated S240527en.	
GW240527_230910 2024-05-27 23:09:10	2026-05-22	28; towards Horologium	10.7+0.3 −0.4	1190±320	14.07+0.76 −0.63	−0.03+0.20 −0.24	BH	27.6+8.9 −9.6	BH	10.0+4.9 −2.1	BH	36.4+7.1 −5.3	0.58+0.10 −0.08	Originally designated S240527fv.	
GW240530 2024-05-30 01:24:17	2026-05-22	640	10.6+0.5 −0.6	1010+630 −500	9.26+0.78 −0.75	0.04+0.25 −0.11	BH	14.1+8.4 −3.3	BH	8.3+2.1 −3.0	BH	21.6+5.6 −2.3	0.68+0.07 −0.05	Originally designated S240530a.	
GW240531_040326 2024-05-31 04:03:26	2026-05-22	930	8.5+0.4 −0.6	3000+1600 −1500	14.4+2.6 −1.8	0.14+0.22 −0.21	BH	19.5+7.4 −3.7	BH	14.3+3.5 −4.3	BH	32.2+6.1 −4.1	0.74±0.09	Originally designated S240531aa.	
GW240531_075248 2024-05-31 07:52:48	2026-05-22	1700	8.6+0.4 −0.5	4100+2800 −2200	23.4+5.6 −3.8	0.04+0.26 −0.27	BH	33.0+10.4 −7.6	BH	22.6+7.6 −6.4	BH	53.1+12.2 −8.7	0.70+0.11 −0.13	Originally designated S240531bp.	
GW240601_061200 2024-06-01 06:12:00	2026-05-22	810	8.3+0.5 −0.7	5100+4400 −2600	35.3+9.7 −7.9	−0.08+0.27 −0.31	BH	52+20 −16	BH	32+12 −11	BH	82+22 −19	0.65+0.12 −0.17	Originally designated S240601aj.	
GW240601_231004 2024-06-01 23:10:04	2026-05-22	810	9.8+0.3 −0.5	1270+530 −540	7.80+0.65 −0.51	0.09+0.16 −0.07	BH	10.6+4.8 −1.7	BH	7.7+1.5 −2.4	BH	17.7+2.6 −1.4	0.72+0.06 −0.05	Originally designated S240601co.	
GW240612 2024-06-12 08:15:40	2026-05-22	2800	7.4+0.3 −0.6	6200+4100 −3100	38.5+12.2 −8.5	0.07±0.34	BH	55+21 −13	BH	38±16	BH	88+25 −17	0.71+0.13 −0.15		
GW240615_113620 2024-06-15 11:36:20	2026-05-22	6; towards northern Andromeda	23.8+0.1 −0.2	1560+290 −450	25.9+1.7 −1.2	−0.07+0.11 −0.13	BH	34.0+5.4 −3.7	BH	26.4+4.0 −4.8	BH	57.8+3.3 −2.4	0.66+0.05 −0.06	Originally designated S240615dg.	
GW240615_160735 2024-06-15 16:07:35	2026-05-22	1100	9.9+0.3 −0.5	4000±1900	20.4+4.0 −2.4	0.28+0.20 −0.24	BH	28.5+7.9 −5.6	BH	20.0+5.7 −5.6	BH	45.9+8.0 −5.6	0.78+0.08 −0.11	Originally designated S240615ea.	
GW240618 2024-06-18 07:16:27	2026-05-22	5400	8.1+0.4 −0.6	5500+5100 −2900	43+13 −10	0.00+0.30 −0.32	BH	65+24 −19	BH	40+17 −15	BH	101+28 −23	0.68+0.13 −0.17	Originally designated S240618ah.	
GW240621_195059 2024-06-21 19:50:59	2026-05-22	32; towards Perseus	27.6+0.1 −0.2	1210+260 −430	28.4+2.2 −1.4	0.00±0.10	BH	36.8+4.4 −3.7	BH	29.7+4.1 −5.2	BH	62.9+4.2 −2.6	0.68±0.04	Originally designated S240621dy.	
GW240621_200935 2024-06-21 20:09:35	2026-05-22	1600	8.9+0.3 −0.5	4800+3000 −2400	31.1+7.6 −5.3	−0.09+0.23 −0.28	BH	41.6+11.6 −8.3	BH	31.6+9.8 −9.5	BH	70+16 −11	0.67+0.10 −0.12	Originally designated S240621eb.	
GW240621_214041 2024-06-21 21:40:41	2026-05-22	3200	7.5+0.4 −0.6	6800+4800 −3400	32.1+10.3 −6.7	0.00+0.26 −0.28	BH	45+17 −11	BH	32+13 −11	BH	73+22 −15	0.69+0.11 −0.13	Originally designated S240621em.	
GW240622 2024-06-22 00:40:08	2026-05-22	280	12.3+0.3 −0.4	1470+600 −530	12.50+0.98 −0.91	0.25+0.13 −0.10	BH	18.6+7.6 −4.0	BH	11.3+2.9 −3.2	BH	28.7+4.8 −2.8	0.77+0.07 −0.05	Originally designated S240622h.	
GW240627 2024-06-27 13:16:22	2026-05-22	890	9.2+0.5 −0.6	1350+620 −570	8.08+0.72 −0.57	0.00+0.19 −0.16	BH	13.2+5.7 −3.5	BH?	6.7+2.4 −1.8	BH	19.3+4.0 −2.2	0.65±0.08	Originally designated S240627by.	
GW240629 2024-06-29 14:52:56	2026-05-22	260	12.3+0.3 −0.4	1280+340 −500	8.01+0.61 −0.35	0.04+0.11 −0.06	BH	11.1+3.0 −1.7	BH	7.8+1.4 −1.6	BH	18.1+1.8 −1.1	0.69+0.03 −0.04	Originally designated S240629by.	
GW240630 2024-06-30 10:17:03	2026-05-22	700	10.1+0.3 −0.5	3200+1500 −1400	21.4+3.5 −2.5	−0.04+0.23 −0.27	BH	28.6+7.6 −4.8	BH	21.6+5.0 −5.3	BH	48.0+7.5 −5.5	0.69+0.10 −0.11	Originally designated S240630t.	
GW240703 2024-07-03 19:13:55	2026-05-22	5500	10.1+0.3 −0.6	1880+1540 −860	26.2+3.8 −4.0	0.05+0.21 −0.20	BH	34.4+8.5 −6.2	BH	26.4+5.9 −6.7	BH	58.3+8.0 −8.8	0.71+0.09 −0.08	Originally designated S240703ad.	
GW240705 2024-07-05 05:32:15	2026-05-22	270	14.3+0.2 −0.3	3700+1400 −1600	34.9+5.7 −3.6	−0.03+0.20 −0.21	BH	47.1+9.7 −7.7	BH	35.3+8.0 −8.2	BH	78.2+12.1 −7.7	0.69+0.10 −0.09	Originally designated S240705at.	
GW240716 2024-07-16 03:49:00	2026-05-22	10000	13.0+0.3 −0.4	1860+1390 −930	28.1+3.9 −3.3	−0.02+0.22 −0.25	BH	40.3+8.8 −8.0	BH	26.5+6.7 −6.4	BH	63.9+8.4 −7.5	0.67+0.10 −0.13	Originally designated S240716b.	
GW240824 2024-08-24 20:56:09	2026-05-22	3000	7.8+0.5 −0.7	5300+5400 −3000	43+17 −12	0.08±0.35	BH	70+32 −24	BH	37+20 −17	BH	103+36 −26	0.69+0.15 −0.20		
GW240825 2024-08-25 05:51:46	2026-05-22	510	9.7+0.4 −0.6	1250+530 −550	8.77+0.77 −0.61	0.07+0.19 −0.13	BH	13.2+5.8 −3.0	BH	7.9+2.0 −2.2	BH	20.3+3.9 −2.0	0.69+0.07 −0.06	Originally designated S240825ar.	
GW240830 2024-08-30 21:11:20	2026-05-22	460	10.7+0.4 −0.5	1140+500 −490	8.33+0.66 −0.54	0.07+0.13 −0.07	BH	11.9+3.6 −2.3	BH	7.8+1.6 −1.7	BH	18.9+2.3 −1.6	0.69±0.04	Originally designated S240830gn.	
GW240902 2024-09-02 14:33:06	2026-05-22	910	9.6+0.4 −0.5	2900+1700 −1300	18.2+3.6 −2.6	−0.03+0.28 −0.30	BH	24.4+6.8 −4.4	BH	18.3+4.9 −5.2	BH	40.8+7.5 −5.5	0.69+0.11 −0.12	Originally designated S240902bq.	
GW240907 2024-09-07 15:38:33	2026-05-22	1600	9.1+0.3 −0.5	4500+3100 −2100	28.3+6.5 −5.0	0.04±0.26	BH	38.0+11.3 −8.0	BH	28.3+8.7 −8.5	BH	63+14 −11	0.71±0.10	Originally designated S240907cg.	
GW240908_082628 2024-09-08 08:26:28	2026-05-22	160; towards northern Aries	10.0+0.3 −0.6	3100+2600 −1300	28.6+5.6 −5.8	0.14+0.24 −0.25	BH	39.8+11.8 −9.4	BH	27.7+8.4 −9.2	BH	65+11 −13	0.73+0.10 −0.13	Originally designated S240908bs.	
GW240908_125134 2024-09-08 12:51:34	2026-05-22	1100	8.3+0.3 −0.6	4700+3500 −2300	32.5+8.6 −6.6	−0.09+0.24 −0.30	BH	45+15 −11	BH	32±11	BH	74+18 −14	0.66+0.10 −0.14	Originally designated S240908dg.	
GW240910 2024-09-10 10:35:35	2026-05-22	440	17.4±0.2	740+170 −310	7.16+0.39 −0.19	0.12+0.12 −0.07	BH	10.9+3.1 −2.4	BH	6.3+1.7 −1.3	BH	16.6+1.9 −1.1	0.70±0.04	Originally designated S240910ci.	
GW240915_001357 2024-09-15 00:13:57	2026-05-22	16; towards Southern Puppis	16.2+0.2 −0.3	920+190 −290	7.95+0.37 −0.21	0.13+0.16 −0.05	BH	10.9+5.5 −1.7	BH	7.7+1.3 −2.3	BH	17.88+3.22 −0.86	0.72+0.04 −0.03	Originally designated S240915b.	
GW240915_105151 2024-09-15 10:51:51	2026-05-22	4400	13.7+0.3 −0.4	630+260 −280	8.07+0.40 −0.32	0.07+0.22 −0.09	BH	11.6+7.3 −2.2	BH?	7.5+1.7 −2.6	BH	8.5+4.6 −1.2	0.70+0.06 −0.04	Originally designated S240915bd.	
GW240916 2024-09-16 18:43:52	2026-05-22	1500	9.1+0.3 −0.5	1280+630 −640	7.89+0.80 −0.62	0.05+0.14 −0.09	BH	10.7+4.2 −1.7	BH	7.8+1.5 −2.2	BH	17.8+2.5 −1.6	0.70±0.05	Originally designated S240916ar.	
GW240919 2024-09-19 06:15:59	2026-05-22	21; towards Southern Perseus	16.2+0.2 −0.3	1870+820 −740	29.0+3.2 −2.6	−0.02+0.16 −0.17	BH	38.3+6.6 −5.5	BH	29.6+5.4 −5.9	BH	64.7+6.5 −5.6	0.68+0.07 −0.06	Originally designated S240919bn.	
GW240920_073424 2024-09-20 07:34:24	2026-05-22	420	13.3+0.3 −0.4	1440+620 −550	15.6+1.5 −1.3	−0.09+0.19 −0.16	BH	24.7+7.6 −5.6	BH	13.4+3.3 −3.2	BH	36.7+5.6 −3.8	0.64+0.11 −0.09	Originally designated S240920bz.	
GW240920_124024 2024-09-20 12:40:24	2026-05-22	160	37.0±0.1	1090+220 −320	29.8+1.7 −1.2	−0.04+0.08 −0.09	BH	37.1+4.0 −2.8	BH	31.9+3.0 −3.9	BH	65.6+3.5 −2.4	0.68+0.04 −0.03	Originally designated S240920dw.	
GW240921 2024-09-21 20:18:35	2026-05-22	1800	11.1+0.4 −0.7	920+760 −300	15.62+0.76 −1.52	0.00+0.17 −0.22	BH	34.9+8.9 −9.4	BH	9.8+3.0 −1.7	BH	43.7+7.6 −7.2	0.52+0.08 −0.06	Originally designated S240921cw.	
GW240922 2024-09-22 14:21:06	2026-05-22	200; towards Capricornus	12.4+0.3 −0.4	1230+340 −500	8.12+0.63 −0.37	0.07+0.12 −0.06	BH	11.5+3.9 −2.0	BH	7.8+1.5 −1.8	BH	18.4+2.3 −1.2	0.70+0.04 −0.03	Originally designated S240922df.	
GW240923 2024-09-23 20:40:06	2026-05-22	440; towards Hercules, Corona Borealis, or Serpens Caput	11.7+0.2 −0.4	4000+1800 −1900	34.1+7.3 −4.8	0.01+0.20 −0.21	BH	46.1+10.3 −7.9	BH	34.9+9.9 −10.6	BH	76.3+15.1 −9.1	0.70+0.08 −0.10	Originally designated S240923ct.	
GW240924 2024-09-24 00:03:16	2026-05-22	800	9.9+0.4 −0.5	3700+2600 −1700	34.2+8.4 −6.3	0.10+0.23 −0.24	BH	46.0+14.3 −9.9	BH	34+11 −10	BH	76+18 −14	0.73+0.10 −0.11	Originally designated S240924a.	
GW240925 2024-09-25 00:58:09	2026-05-22	26; towards central Aquila	31.9±0.1	360+60 −170	6.85+0.23 −0.07	0.02+0.07 −0.02	BH	8.87+1.83 −0.88	BH	7.09+0.78 −1.24	BH	15.26+0.65 −0.40	0.69±0.02	Originally designated S240925n.	
GW240930_035959 2024-09-30 03:59:59	2026-05-22	370	15.2+0.2 −0.3	950+490 −290	14.50+0.77 −0.98	−0.05+0.14 −0.13	BH	25.5+5.0 −4.8	BH	11.2+2.1 −1.8	BH	35.5+3.8 −3.4	0.58+0.05 −0.04	Originally designated S240930aa.	
GW240930_234614 2024-09-30 23:46:14	2026-05-22	1000	9.0+0.7 −0.6	3600+2600 −2000	23.9+4.9 −3.7	0.04+0.27 −0.30	BH	35.8+14.0 −8.9	BH	21.9±7.2	BH	55.5+12.0 −8.9	0.71+0.11 −0.15	Originally designated S240930du.	
GW241002 2024-10-02 03:05:59	2026-05-22	720	11.4+0.3 −0.4	1460+950 −680	28.8+3.9 −3.4	−0.10+0.20 −0.23	BH	37.3+8.4 −5.5	BH	29.9+5.6 −7.1	BH	64.2+8.2 −7.2	0.66+0.08 −0.09	Originally designated S241002e.	
GW241006 2024-10-06 01:53:33	2026-05-22	240	16.4+0.2 −0.3	1850+650 −710	19.4+1.8 −1.3	0.07±0.13	BH	24.6+4.2 −2.8	BH		BH	20.3+2.8 −3.1	0.71+0.05 −0.04	Originally designated S241006k.	
GW241007 2024-10-07 08:29:43	2026-05-22	980	9.3+0.3 −0.5	4000+2300 −2000	26.7+6.8 −4.3	0.11±0.26	BH	36.6+13.5 −7.7	BH	26.6+8.4 −7.9	BH	60.1+14.9 −9.3	0.74+0.10 −0.12	Originally designated S241007bw.	
GW2441009_022835 2024-10-09 02:28:35	2026-05-22	2400	7.8+0.4 −0.6	5600+3800 −2800	27.1+8.2 −5.6	0.09+0.26 −0.25	BH	37.1+14.1 −8.9	BH	26.8+10.2 −9.5	BH	61+18 −12	0.73+0.10 −0.12	Originally designated S241009l.	
GW241009_084816 2024-10-09 08:48:16	2026-05-22	430	11.8+0.3 −0.4	1130+580 −480	8.78+0.67 −0.65	−0.05+0.14 −0.08	BH	12.7+4.0 −2.5	BH	8.1±1.9	BH	20.1+2.4 −1.9	0.67+0.06 −0.04	Originally designated S241009an.	
GW241009_220455 2024-10-09 22:04:55	2026-05-22	90; towards Eastern Cepheus	9.2+0.3 −0.8	2900+2200 −1300	25.2+4.0 −5.1	0.11+0.23 −0.25	BH	33.2+8.1 −6.6	BH	25.5+5.9 −8.1	BH	56.0+8.7 −10.2	0.723+0.09 −0.11	Originally designated S241009em.	
GW241011 2024-10-11 23:38:34	2026-05-22	49; towards Ophiuchus or Serpens Cauda	35.8±0.1	210±40	9.09±0.08	0.50+0.06 −0.04	BH	19.5+2.6 −2.0	BH	5.96±0.58	BH	24.4+2.1 −1.5	0.84±0.02	Originally designated S241011k.	
GW241101 2024-11-01 22:05:23	2026-05-22	8700	10.6+0.3 −0.5	2200+1400 −1000	23.6+5.8 −3.1	0.15+0.33 −0.29	BH	41+13 −12	BH	19.3+9.8 −5.7	BH	57.7+11.9 −9.0	0.70+0.16 −0.17	Originally designated S241101ee.	
GW241102_124058 2024-11-02 12:40:58	2026-05-22	23; towards Andromeda or Lacerta	21.6+0.1 −0.2	390+60 −110	8.12+0.17 −0.09	0.06+0.11 −0.04	BH	10.9+3.2 −1.4	BH	8.0+1.2 −1.7	BH	18.10+1.54 −0.46	0.70+0.03 −0.04	Originally designated S241102br.	
GW241102_144729 2024-11-02 14:47:29	2026-05-22	880	11.3+0.3 −0.5	3400+2000 −1600	31.5+6.5 −4.8	−0.09+0.21 −0.27	BH	44.4+12.3 −8.6	BH	31.0+9.9 −11.1	BH	72.0+12.7 −9.4	0.65+0.09 −0.15	Originally designated S241102cy.	
GW241109_033317 2024-11-09 03:33:17	2026-05-22	7200	10.4+0.3 −0.5	2700+2000 −1500	31.4+7.0 −5.2	0.01+0.22 −0.24	BH	42.4+11.3 −8.5	BH	31.7+9.3 −9.4	BH	70+15 −11	0.70±0.10	Originally designated S241109p.	
GW241109_115924 2024-11-09 11:59:24	2026-05-22	12000	11.6+0.2 −0.4	600+230 −290	5.29+0.28 −0.20	0.01+0.16 −0.05	BH	7.3+2.8 −1.1	BH?	5.14+0.90 −1.26	BH	11.94+1.58 −0.66	0.68±0.04	Originally designated S241109bn.	
GW241110 2024-11-10 12:41:23	2026-05-22	100; towards Northern Centaurus	9.9+0.3 −0.5	740±260	9.84+0.50 −0.42	−0.31+0.23 −0.18	BH	16.4+5.1 −4.1	BH	8.0+2.2 −1.6	BH	23.7+3.6 −2.2	0.52+0.07 −0.06	Originally designated S241110br.	
GW241111 2024-11-11 11:15:52	2026-05-22	490	15.1+0.2 −0.3	1550+580 −740	19.5+2.7 −1.6	0.10+0.15 −0.14	BH	25.3+4.4 −3.3	BH	20.5+3.9 −4.2	BH	43.2+5.4 −3.4	0.72±0.06	Originally designated S241111bn.	
GW241113 2024-11-13 16:35:07	2026-05-22	14000	12.0+0.2 −0.3	1360+670 −630	14.4+1.5 −1.1	0.50±0.11	BH	19.3+5.4 −3.0	BH	14.4+2.7 −3.3	BH	31.7+3.7 −2.8	0.85±0.04	Originally designated S241113p.	
GW241114_024711 2024-11-14 02:47:11	2026-05-22	200	11.1+0.4 −0.5	2600+1600 −1000	29.2+4.7 −4.3	0.12+0.21 −0.24	BH	47.0+9.7 −11.0	BH	25.0+8.2 −7.3	BH	68.9+9.4 −9.3	0.74+0.09 −0.14	Originally designated S241114y.	
GW241114_235258 2024-11-14 23:52:58	2026-05-22	11000	12.2+0.2 −0.4	790+300 −350	8.04+0.50 −0.37	0.06+0.18 −0.08	BH	11.3+5.2 −1.9	BH	7.7+1.5 −2.2	BH	18.2+3.0 −1.2	0.69+0.05 −0.04	Originally designated S241114bi.	
GW241116 2024-11-16 15:17:53	2026-05-22	3300	8.4±0.6	5700+5600 −2900	34.0+18.8 −9.6	0.28+0.34 −0.48	BH	70+57 −28	BH	24+26 −13	BH	95+48 −29	0.78+0.14 −0.27	Originally designated S241116cq.	
GW241124 2024-11-24 02:49:14	2026-05-22	3900	7.9+0.5 −0.6	4500+4000 −2300	28.4+8.6 −6.1	0.04+0.33 −0.29	BH	42+32 −12	BH	26±11	BH	67+26 −15	0.68+0.14 −0.19	Originally designated S241124w.	
GW241125 2024-11-25 01:01:16	2026-05-22	2400	9.8+0.4 −0.5	4700+3900 −2200	45±10	0.09±0.27	BH	60+14 −13	BH	47+14 −17	BH	101+22 −20	0.73+0.10 −0.11	Originally designated S241125n.	
GW241127 2024-11-27 06:10:08	2026-05-22	83; towards Musca or Southern Centaurus	31.2+0.1 −0.2	1080+220 −180	30.8+3.6 −2.0	−0.16+0.13 −0.14	BH	63.8+8.7 −7.7	BH	20.8+6.5 −3.4	BH	83.0+6.2 −5.4	0.56+0.09 −0.10	Originally designated S241127aj.	
GW241129 2024-11-29 02:18:32	2026-05-22	350	14.9+0.2 −0.3	2550+740 −910	22.7+2.8 −1.7	0.17±0.16	BH	30.4+6.8 −4.5	BH	23.0+4.5 −4.8	BH	50.6+5.7 −3.9	0.75±0.08	Originally designated S241129aa.	
GW21130_034908 2024-11-30 03:49:08	2026-05-22	450	13.3+0.3 −0.4	1990+990 −930	23.3+2.9 −2.2	0.05±0.15	BH	29.9+5.8 −4.1	BH	24.3±4.1	BH	51.6+6.3 −4.9	0.71+0.06 −0.05	Originally designated S241130n.	
GW241130_110422 2024-11-30 11:04:22	2026-05-22	1300	9.2+0.3 −0.5	1320+530 −570	7.31+0.64 −0.48	0.04+0.20 −0.10	BH	11.1+5.2 −2.5	BH?	6.5+1.8 −1.9	BH	17.0+3.5 −1.7	0.67±0.05	Originally designated S241130be.	
GW241201 2024-12-01 05:57:58	2026-05-22	4100	7.6+0.4 −0.6	7100+4700 −3800	33.5+10.7 −7.5	0.13±0.36	BH	47+19 −12	BH	33±13	BH	76+23 −15	0.74+0.13 −0.15	Originally designated S241201ac.	
GW241210_060606 2024-12-10 06:06:06	2026-05-22	900	11.7+0.3 −0.4	2600±1200	21.3+4.1 −2.4	0.04+0.22 −0.19	BH	29.0+8.2 −5.2	BH	21.4±5.5	BH	47.9+8.8 −5.5	0.70+0.10 −0.09	Originally designated S241210cw.	
GW241210_120900 2024-12-10 12:09:00	2026-05-22	3500	8.3+0.3 −0.6	3600+3000 −1800	26.4+6.4 −4.9	−0.07+0.24 −0.30	BH	40+15 −11	BH	23.6+9.2 −8.0	BH	62+14 −12	0.64+0.11 −0.17	Originally designated S241210fu.	
GW241225_042553 2024-12-25 04:25:53	2026-05-22	3800	660+190 −270	17.0+0.2 −0.3	8.65+0.42 −0.26	0.12+0.09 −0.05	BH	12.4+3.0 −2.3	BH	8.1±1.5	BH	19.6+1.8 −1.1	0.72+0.06 −0.04	Originally designated S241225c.	
GW241225_082815 2024-12-25 08:28:15	2026-05-22	960	17.7±0.3	1880+1080 −880	41.8+6.1 −5.2	−0.17+0.20 −0.22	BH	55.7+11.0 −8.5	BH	42.2+8.4 −9.4	BH	94+13 −11	0.67+0.08 −0.11	Originally designated S241225v.	
GW241229 2024-12-29 15:58:44	2026-05-22	3500	7.6+0.4 −0.6	6800+5200 −3400	35.0+12.3 −8.5	0.05+0.31 −0.32	BH	52+22 −15	BH	33+16 −15	BH	82+26 −18	0.69+0.13 −0.18		
GW241230_084504 2024-12-30 08:45:04	2026-05-22	12000	11.8+0.2 −0.3	2900+1400 −1300	32.4+5.7 −4.0	−0.14+0.21 −0.23	BH	42.4+9.5 −6.7	BH	33.5+7.7 −8.3	BH	72.4+12.1 −8.4	0.65+0.08 −0.10	Originally designated S241230bd.	
GW241230_233618 2024-12-30 23:36:18	2026-05-22	450	11.6+0.3 −0.4	2700+2100 −1300	49.3+10.8 −9.7	−0.14+0.25 −0.29	BH	68+17 −14	BH	49+16 −19	BH	112+22 −18	0.64+0.11 −0.16	Originally designated S241230ev.	
GW241231 2024-12-31 05:41:33	2026-05-22	130	16.9+0.2 −0.3	910+190 −330	8.08+0.43 −0.22	0.08+0.12 −0.08	BH	12.4+3.3 −2.8	BH	7.1+2.0 −1.3	BH	18.7+2.1 −1.3	0.68+0.04 −0.05	Originally designated S241231bg.	
GW250101_011205 2025-01-01 01:12:05	2026-05-22	530	9.1+0.4 −0.6	3200+1700 −1500	21.5+4.1 −3.3	−0.05+0.24 −0.31	BH	30.0+8.8 −5.8	BH	21.1+5.9 −7.2	BH	48.7+8.8 −6.2	0.67+0.10 −0.17	Originally designated S250101k.	
GW250104 2025-01-04 01:51:22	2026-05-22	1800	11.0+0.3 −0.4	4800+2500 −2300	33.9+8.1 −5.2	0.11+0.22 −0.23	BH	45.8+11.0 −8.8	BH	34.5+10.7 −9.9	BH	76+11 −17	0.73+0.09 −0.10	Originally designated S250104v.	
GW250108 2025-01-08 15:22:21	2026-05-22	770	10.3+0.3 −0.4	3800+2400 −1900	37.6+7.7 −5.5	0.05±0.28	BH	54+15 −12	BH	36±10	BH	86+17 −12	0.70+0.12 −0.15	Originally designated S250108eo.	
GW250109_010541 2025-01-09 01:05:41	2026-05-22	520	11.2+0.3 −0.4	3400±1700	27.4+6.4 −3.9	−0.11+0.27 −0.29	BH	37.5+14.7 −7.1	BH	27.4+8.0 −8.9	BH	62.2+14.0 −8.2	0.66±0.12	Originally designated S250109f.	
GW250109_074552 2025-01-09 07:45:52	2026-05-22	7500	10.9+0.3 −0.5	2300+1400 −1100	29.6+4.7 −3.8	0.07±0.20	BH	39.0+8.3 −6.3	BH	30.2+6.8 −7.2	BH	65.9+9.8 −8.1	0.72+0.08 −0.09	Originally designated S250109bi.	
GW250114 2025-01-14 08:22:03	2025-09-10	42; towards Ursa Major, Leo Minor, Leo, or Cancer	76.9+0 −0.1	403+74 −70	28.71+0.50 −0.51	−0.03+0.04 −0.05	BH	33.76+1.28 −0.90	BH	32.26+0.95 −1.47	BH	62.9+1.0 −1.1	0.68±0.01	Originally designated S250114ax.	
GW250116 2025-01-16 01:53:18	2026-05-22	3000	7.6+0.4 −0.6	5200+3900 −2500	23.0+6.9 −5.0	0.15+0.31 −0.33	BH	34.2+14.5 −9.3	BH	21.3+8.8 −8.3	BH	53+15 −11	0.73+0.12 −0.19		
GW250118_023225 2025-01-18 02:32:25	2026-05-22	2400	8.8+0.3 −0.5	5800+3800 −2900	31.1+8.9 −6.0	0.04+0.28 −0.31	BH	44+15 −10	BH	31±11	BH	71+19 −13	0.70+0.11 −0.14	Originally designated S250118t.	
GW250118_055802 2025-01-18 05:58:02	2026-05-22	710	9.6+0.4 −0.8	940+630 −380	7.36+0.45 −0.63	0.11+0.24 −0.09	BH	10.3+7.5 −1.8	BH?	6.9+1.5 −2.6	BH	16.6+4.9 −1.5	0.72+0.06 −0.05	Originally designated S250118az.	
GW250118_170523 2025-01-18 17:05:23	2026-05-22	800	13.1+0.2 −0.4	1910+800 −740	29.0+3.5 −2.9	0.12+0.18 −0.19	BH	38.1+8.1 −5.6	BH	29.6+5.4 −6.3	BH	64.4+7.3 −6.2	0.73±0.07	Originally designated S250118dp.	
GW250119_025138 2025-01-19 02:51:38	2026-05-22	590	13.7+0.2 −0.3	3100+1100 −1300	25.7+4.0 −2.5	0.06±0.18	BH	33.8+6.3 −4.8	BH	26.7+5.6 −6.3	BH	57.1+8.2 −5.0	0.72±0.08	Originally designated S250119ag.	
GW250119_190238 2025-01-19 19:02:38	2026-05-22	14; towards 67 Piscium	20.4+0.2 −0.3	310+290 −70	9.38+0.14 −0.48	0.09+0.05 −0.03	BH	11.54+1.95 −0.81	BH	9.95+0.77 −1.56	BH	20.56+0.57 −0.97	0.71±0.02	Originally designated S250119cv.	

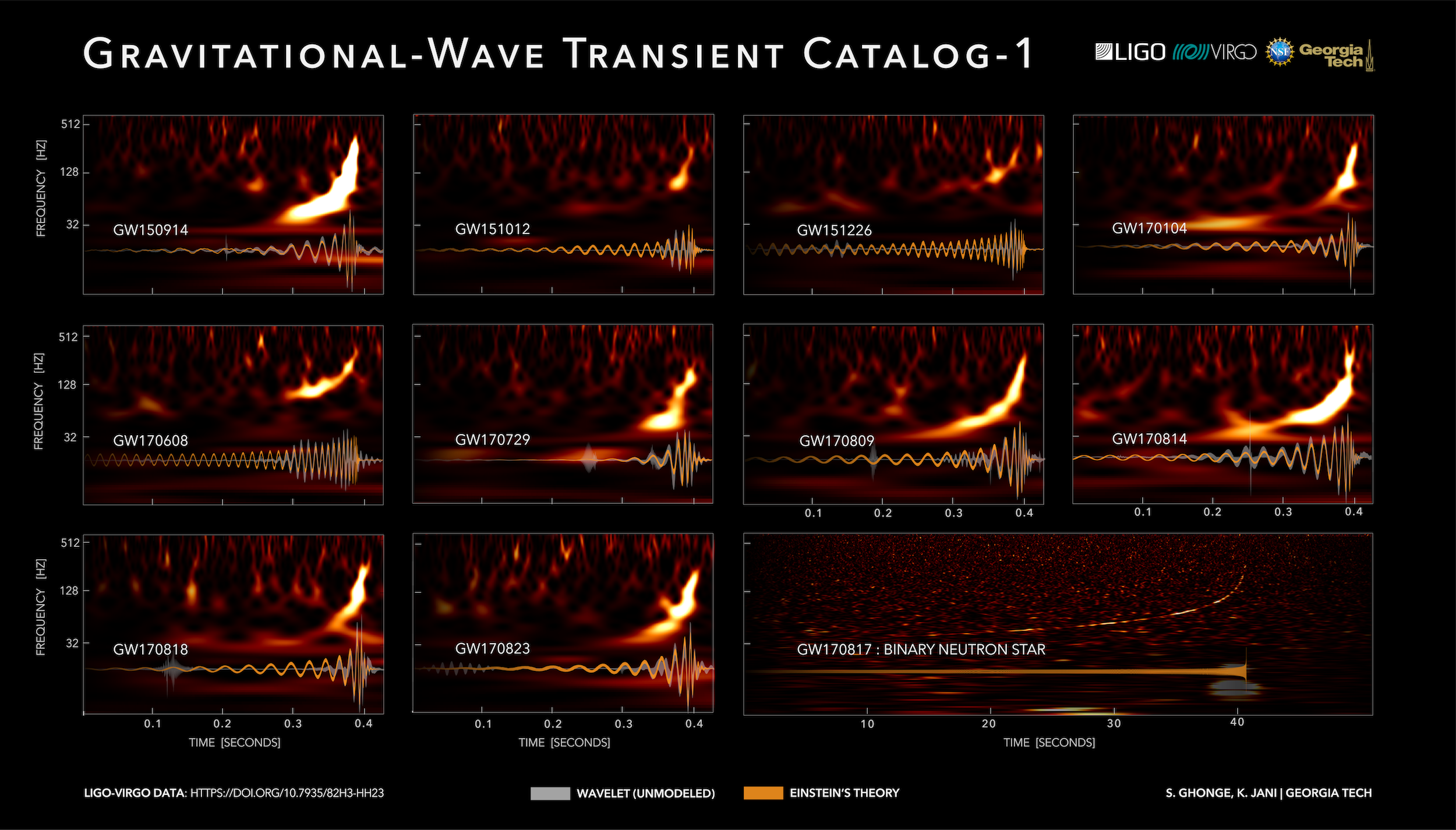
Gravitational Wave Transient Catalog 1. Credit:LIGO Scientific Collaboration and Virgo Collaboration/Georgia Tech/S. Ghonge & K. Jani

== Candidate events and marginal detections ==
There is possible detection of nanohertz waves by observation of the timing of pulsars, but they have not been confirmed at the 5 sigma level of confidence, as of 2023.

=== Marginal detections from O1 and O2 ===
In addition to well-constrained detections listed above, a number of low-significance detections of possible signals were made by LIGO and Virgo. Their characteristics are listed below, only including detections with a <50% chance of being noise:

Marginal event detections
Candidate event	Detection time (UTC)	Date published	Luminosity distance (Mpc) (Note: 1 Mpc is approximately 3.26 Mly.)	Detector (Note: Which instruments observed the event. (H = LIGO Hanford, L=LIGO Livingston, V=Virgo))	False alarm rate (year)	Effective spin	Primary		Secondary		Probability of terrestrial noise	Ref
Candidate event	Detection time (UTC)	Date published	Luminosity distance (Mpc)	Detector	False alarm rate (year)	Effective spin	Type	Mass (M_{☉})	Type	Mass (M_{☉})	Probability of terrestrial noise	Ref
151205	2015-12-05 19:55:25	2019-10-11	3000+2400 −1600	H,L	0.61	0.14+0.40 −0.38	BH	67+28 −17	BH	42+16 −19	0.47	
170121	2017-01-21 21:25:36	2019-04-15		H,L		−0.3±0.3	BH	29+4 −3	BH		<0.01	
170304	2017-03-04 16:37:53	2019-10-11	2300+1600 −1200	H,L	2.5	0.11+0.29 −0.27	BH	44.9+17.6 −9.4	BH	31.8+9.5 −11.6	0.30	
170402	2017-04-02 21:51:50	2019-10-21		H,L							0.32	
170727	2017-07-27 01:04:30	2019-10-11	2200+1500 −1100	H,L	180	−0.05+0.25 −0.30	BH	41.6+12.8 −7.9	BH	30.4+7.9 −8.2	0.006	
170817A	2017-08-17 03:02:46	2019-10-21		H,L,V	11.5	0.5±0.2	BH	56+16 −10	BH	40+10 −11	0.14	

=== Observation candidates from O3/2019 ===
From observation run O3/2019 on, observations are published as Open Public Alerts to facilitate multi-messenger observations of events. Candidate event records can be directly accessed at the Gravitational-Wave Candidate Event Database (GraceDB). On 1 April 2019, the start of the third observation run was announced with a circular published in the public alerts tracker. The first O3/2019 binary black hole detection alert was broadcast on 8 April 2019. A significant percentage of O3 candidate events detected by LIGO are accompanied by corresponding triggers at Virgo.

False alarm rates are mixed, with more than half of events assigned false alarm rates greater than 1 per 20 years, contingent on presence of glitches around signal, foreground electromagnetic instability, seismic activity, and operational status of any one of the three LIGO-Virgo instruments. For instance, events S190421ar and S190425z weren't detected by Virgo and LIGO's Hanford site, respectively.

The LIGO/Virgo collaboration took a short break from observing during the month of October 2019 to improve performance and prepare for future plans, with no signals detected in that month as a result.

The Kamioka Gravitational Wave Detector (KAGRA) in Japan became operational on 25 February 2020, likely improving the detection and localization of future gravitational wave signals. However, KAGRA does not report their signals in real-time on GraceDB as LIGO and Virgo do, so the results of their observation run will likely not be published until the end of O3.

The LIGO-Virgo collaboration ended the O3 run early on March 27, 2020, due to health concerns from the COVID-19 pandemic.

Candidate detections from O3 by month
- BNS mergers
- NS-BH mergers
- mass gap
- BBH mergers
- terrestrial noise
- false positives
- unidentified

O3 detections by distance
- BNS mergers
- NS–BH mergers
- mass gap
- BBH mergers

List of unconfirmed O3 event alerts

GW event	Detection time (UTC)	Location area (Note: The area of the sky within which it was possible to localize the source.) (deg^{2})	Luminosity distance (Mpc) (Note: 1 Mpc is approximately 3.26 Mly.)	Detector (Note: Which instruments observed the event. (H = LIGO Hanford, L=LIGO Livingston, V=Virgo))	False alarm Rate (Hz)	False alarm chance in O3 (Note: The chance a random signal of this significance would occur at any point in O3's 11-month run. Calculated by 1 – (1-false alarm rate in Hz)^{28,512,000}. This is not the chance of the given signal being 'real' or not: Background contamination (such as earthquakes) can cause statistically significant signals as well, and although four detections have a >50% chance to have occurred randomly in O3, there is only a 19.4% chance that none of these signals would be real.)	Classification					Notes	Ref
GW event	Detection time (UTC)	Location area (deg^{2})	Luminosity distance (Mpc)	Detector	False alarm Rate (Hz)	False alarm chance in O3	NS / NS (Note: Probability that both components have mass < 3 M_{☉})	NS / BH (Note: Probability that one component has mass < 3 M_{☉} and the other has mass > 5 M_{☉})	BH / BH (Note: Probability that both components have mass > 5 M_{☉})	Mass gap (Note: Probability that at least one component has a mass in the range 3–5 M_{☉}, between those of known neutron stars and black holes, a range sometimes identified as the "lower" mass gap)	Terrestrial (Note: Probability that the source is terrestrial or non-cosmological (e.g. foreground noises and signals [e.g. "noise"] or a technical/systematic error ["glitch"]))	Notes	Ref
S190901ap	2019-09-01; 23:31:01	14753	241±79	L,V	7.0 10^{−9}	0.181	0.861	0.0	0.0	0.0	0.139		
S190910d	2019-09-10; 01:26:19	2482	632±186	H,L	3.7 10^{−9}	0.100	0.0	0.976	0.0	0.0	0.024		
S190910h	2019-09-10; 08:29:58	24264	230±88	L	3.6 10^{−8}	0.642	0.612	0.0	0.0	0.0	0.388	Detected by only the Livingston detector, resulting in a bad sky localization.	
S190923y	2019-09-23 12:55:59	2107	438±133	H,L	4.8 10^{−8}	0.746	0.0	0.677	0.0	0.0	0.322		
S190930t	2019-09-30 14:34:07	24220	108±38	L	1.5 10^{−8}	0.348	0.0	0.743	0.0	0.0	0.257	Detected by only the Livingston detector, resulting in a bad sky localization; last detection of the O3a run.	
S191205ah	2019-12-05 21:52:08	6378	385±164	H,L,V	1.2 10^{−8}	0.290	0.0	0.932	0.0	0.0	0.068		
S191213g	2019-12-13 04:34:08	4480	201±81	H,L,V	3.5 10^{−8}	0.631	0.768	0.0	0.0	0.0	0.232		
S200213t	2020-02-13 04:10:40	2326	201±80	H,L,V	1.8 10^{−8}	0.401	0.629	0.0	0.0	0.0	0.371		

=== Observation candidates from O4/2023 ===
On 15 June 2022, LIGO announced to start the O4 observing run in March 2023. As the date got closer, engineering challenges delayed the observing run to May 2023. An engineering run to assess the sensitivity of LIGO, Virgo, and KAGRA began in April, with the Hanford detector's first operations beginning on April 29, and the Livingston and Virgo detectors' first operations beginning on May 5.

On March 7, 2023, a gamma-ray burst compatible with a neutron star merger was detected by the Fermi telescope and named GRB 230307A. The burst, identified as being from a host galaxy approximately 296 Mpc away, would likely have only been marginally detected at best by LIGO if it had been operating at the time, as the detectors would only later achieve a sensitivity of 160 Mpc for neutron star mergers by O4's beginning, 3 months later.

Near the end of the engineering run on 15 May 2023, LIGO announced that O4 would be beginning on 24 May 2023, running for 20 months with up to 2 months of maintenance. The LIGO detectors initially failed to achieve the hoped for 160–190 Mpc sensitivity for neutron star mergers, but did achieve an improved 130–150 Mpc sensitivity over O3's 100–140 Mpc, later improving to nearly 160 Mpc for both detectors by late 2023. Virgo was found to have both a damaged mirror and other new, unknown noise sources, limiting its sensitivity to just 31–35 Mpc (similar to its performance during O2 in 2017, and lower than O3's 40–50 Mpc.) As a result, Virgo spent most of 2023 in commissioning, with a deadline of March 2024 to improve its sensitivity before joining O4. KAGRA achieved its planned 1 Mpc sensitivity before returning to commissioning in July, with plans to rejoin at an improved 10 Mpc sensitivity by early 2024. However, the M_{w}7.5 2024 Noto earthquake occurred on 1 January 2024 only 103 kilometres (64 mi) from KAGRA, damaging the detector's sensitive instruments and delaying its development by at least several months.

On 18 May 2023, near the end of the engineering run and shortly before O4 proper, the first candidate gravitational wave event was detected. Four more were detected before the official beginning of the run. In October, LIGO announced a planned pause between January and March 2024, for a mid-run commissioning break intended to reduce noise and improve the uptime of the detectors.

The O4b run began in April 2024 with the addition of the Virgo detector at a sensitivity of 55 Mpc. The Livingston detector achieved an increased sensitivity of 170-175 Mpc, while the Hanford detector maintained its pre-break sensitivity of 155–160 Mpc. Due to a variety of factors including delays in technologies required for O5, the decision was made in June 2024 to extend O4 by several months to June 2025, with O5 expected to begin in late 2027 or early 2028.

Candidate detections from O4 by month (Note: The following events had a pAstro of over 50%, but were at a low significance and thus not validated by the LIGO-Virgo collaboration. Many of these events are likely real, but at least some are likely false positives: 2023 May: S230524b (BBH, pAstro = 0.725), S230525a (BBH, pAstro = 0.724), S230527bv (BBH, pAstro = 0.882), S230528a (NSMG, pAstro = 0.643), S230528bt (BBH, pAstro = 0.880) June: S230604z (BBH, pAstro = 0.748), S230606z (BBH, pAstro = 0.835), S230609a (BBH, pAstro = 0.956), S230615av (BBH, pAstro = 0.912), S230615az (BNS, pAstro = 0.847), S230623at (BBH, pastro = 0.707), S230628aj (BBH, pAstro = 0.694) July: S230711b (BBH, pAstro = 0.792), S230716o (BBH, pAstro = 0.750), S230725am (BBH, pAstro = 0.502), S230728ap (BBH, pAstro = 0.940) August: S230822ac (BBH, pAstro = 0.813), S230830q (BBH, pAstro = 0.923) September: S230902af (BBH, pAstro = 0.798), S230904bg (BBH, pAstro = 0.688) October: S231007w (BBH, pAstro = 0.746), S231025a (BNS, pAstro = 0.588), S231025ap (BBH, pAstro = 0.830) November: S231124z (BBH, pAstro = 0.647) 2024 January: S240116p (BBH, pAstro = 0.789) April: S240407v (BBH, pAstro = 0.882), S240427am (BBH, pAstro = 0.639) May: S240513cx (BBH, pAstro = 0.738), S240525dy (BBH, pAstro = 0.885), S240527dh (BBH, pAstro = 0.915) June: S240613z (BBH, pAstro = 0.923), S240619z (BBH, pAstro = 0.739), S240621ch (BBH, pAstro = 0.680), S240627co (BBH, pAstro = 0.713) July: S240701bn (BBH, pAstro = 0.824) September: S240901ew (BBH, pAstro = 0.881), S240907ah (BBH, pAstro = 0.910), S240913bs (BBH, pAstro = 0.875), S240914db (BBH, pAstro = 0.608), S240915aw (BBH, pAstro = 0.678), S240921s (BBH, pAstro = 0.736), S240921cs (BBH, pAstro = 0.702) October: S241031cn (BBH, pAstro = 0.583) November: S241101s (BBH, pAstro = 0.800), S241106ae (BBH, pAstro = 0.927), S241111u (BBH, pAstro = 0.703), S241115cn (BBH, pAstro = 0.626), S241128cf (BBH, pAstro=0.648) December: S241210ba (BBH, pAstro = 0.632) S241219gz (BBH, pAstro = 0.771) 2025 January: S250103ei (BBH, pAstro = 0.697), S250105dn (BBH, pAstro = 0.753), S250120ah (BBH, pAstro = 0.901), S250123l (BBH, pAstro = 0.809), S250129p (BBH, pAstro = 0.798) February: S250204ar (BBH, pAstro = 0.779), S250207da (BBH, pAstro = 0.707), S250214bv (BBH, pAstro = 0.635), S250228p (BBH, pAstro = 0.798) March: S250304df (BBH, pAstro = 0.731), S250309co (BBH, pAstro = 0.665), S250313j (BBH, pAstro = 0.646), S250313aj (BBH, pAstro = 0.861), S250315ab (BBH, pAstro = 0.765), S250318bl (MGBH, pAstro = 0.584), S250321l (BBH, pAstro = 0.721), S250327u (BBH, pAstro = 0.635) June: S250614bb (BBH, pAstro = 0.648), S250619ca (BBH, pAstro = 0.787) July: S250717x (BBH, pAstro = 0.789) August: S250801h (BBH, pAstro = 0.665), S250805eg (BBH, pAstro = 0.833), S250813ak (BBH, pAstro = 0.660), S250817fb (BBH, pAstro = 0.703), S250822as (BBH, pAstro = 0.713), S250828ch (BBH, pAstro = 0.773) September: S250912x (BBH, pAstro = 0.944), S250926s (BBH, pAstro = 0.906) October: S251016be (BBH, pAstro = 0.861), S251020el (BBh, pAstro = 0.731) November: S251117bc (BBH, pAstro = 0.692))
- BNS mergers
- NS–BH mergers
- mass gap
- BBH mergers
- unidentified

O4 detections by distance
- BNS mergers
- NS–BH mergers
- mass gap
- BBH mergers

List of O4 event alerts

GW event	Detection time (UTC)	Location area (Note: The area of the sky within which it was possible to localize the source.) (deg^{2})	Luminosity distance (Mpc) (Note: 1 Mpc is approximately 3.26 Mly.)	Detector (Note: Which instruments observed the event. (H = LIGO Hanford, L=LIGO Livingston, V=Virgo))	False Alarm Rate (Hz)	False Alarm chance in O4 (Note: The chance a random signal of this significance would occur at any point in O4's 20-month run. Calculated by 1 – (1-false alarm rate in Hz)^{57,456,000}. This is not the chance of the given signal being 'real' or not: Even if there is a 90% chance of O4 having random noise eventually reach a certain level of significance, the chance of such noise occurring 100 separate times in the same period is still very low (in this example, around 0.0026%).)	Classification					Notes	Ref
GW event	Detection time (UTC)	Location area (deg^{2})	Luminosity distance (Mpc)	Detector	False Alarm Rate (Hz)	False Alarm chance in O4	NS / NS (Note: Probability that both components have mass < 3 M_{☉})	NS / BH (Note: Probability that one component has mass < 3 M_{☉} and the other has mass > 5 M_{☉})	BH / BH (Note: Probability that both components have mass > 5 M_{☉})	Mass gap (Note: Probability that at least one component has a mass in the range 3-5 M_{☉}, between those of known neutron stars and black holes, a range sometimes identified as the "lower" mass gap)	Terrestrial (Note: Probability that the source is terrestrial or non-cosmological (e.g. foreground noises and signals [e.g. "noise"] or a technical/systematic error ["glitch"]))	Notes	Ref
S230520ae	2023-05-20; 22:48:41	1702	2014±663	H,L	3.1 10^{−9}	0.161	0.0	0.0	~1.0	0.0	1.4e−7	Detected during the engineering phase, before the official start of O4.	
S230522a	2023-05-22; 09:38:04	24219	3102±1032	L	1.0 10^{−8}	0.448	0.0	0.0	0.99973	0.00071	0.00027	Detected during the engineering phase, before the official start of O4.	
S230522n	2023-05-22; 15:30:32	29021	2221±870	L	6.5 10^{−9}	0.311	0.0	0.0	0.993	0.0041	0.0069	Detected during the engineering phase, before the official start of O4.	
S230708z	2023-07-08; 07:18:59	3373	4647±1696	H,L	7.0 10^{−8}	0.982	0.0	0.0	0.954	0.0041	0.046		
S230802aq	2023-08-02; 11:33:59	25885	576±246	H	2.2 10^{−8}	0.722	0.0	0.020	0.289	0.657	0.035	The other component is a black hole. Detected by only the Hanford detector, resulting in a bad sky localization.	
S230807f	2023-08-07; 20:50:45	5436	5272±1900	H,L	7.1 10^{−8}	0.983	0.0	0.0	0.913	0.041	0.047		
S230822bm	2023-08-22; 23:03:37	3974	5154±1771	H,L	2.6 10^{−8}	0.773	0.0	0.0	0.939	0.042	0.019		
S231020bw	2023-10-20; 18:05:09	386	2620±694	H,L	3.5 10^{−10}	0.020	0.0	0.0	0.99965	0.0	0.00035		
S240406aj	2024-04-06; 06:28:47	1724	2449±692	H,L	1.6 10^{−15}	8.9 10^{−8}	0.0	0.0	~1.0	0.0	9.2e−9		
S240420ax	2024-04-20; 04:21:16	6423	?	H,L	5.7 10^{−8}	0.961	0.0	0.0	0.0	0.0	?	Unidentified gravitational wave "burst" lasting 33 milliseconds at a frequency of 219 Hertz.	
S240422ed	2024-04-22; 21:35:13	259; towards Puppis, Pyxis, or Hydra	188±43	H,L,V	3.1 10^{−13}	1.8 10^{−5}	0.0	0.541	0.0	0.459	1.3e−5		
S240430ca	2024-04-30; 09:35:17	4061	6212±2593	H,L	7.5 10^{−8}	0.986	0.0	0.0	0.920	0.041	0.039		
S240514c	2024-05-14; 08:03:21	30758	4182±1833	L	9.6 10^{−9}	0.425	0.0	0.0	0.9932	0.0	0.0064	Detected by only the Livingston detector, resulting in a bad sky localization.	
S240807h	2024-08-07; 21:45:59	12857	1018±295	L,V	2.0 10^{−11}	0.0012	0.0	0.00010	0.956	0.044	3.2e−5		
S240813c	2024-08-13; 03:45:48	13782	1240±392	L,V	2.6 10^{−9}	0.139	0.0	0.0	0.909	0.089	0.0022		
S240813d	2024-08-13; 04:39:13	1776	1065±259	L,V	1.8 10^{−18}	0.0	0.0	0.0	~1.0	0.0	1.2e−11		
S240917cb	2024-09-17; 13:02:37	8644	6657±3466	H,L	5.4 10^{−8}	0.955	0.0	0.0	0.903	0.057	0.040		
S241122a	2024-11-22; 17:51:00	28549	2267±948	L	6.4 10^{−8}	0.975	0.0	0.0	0.955	0.0	0.045	Detected by only the Livingston detector, resulting in a bad sky localization.	
S241210d	2024-12-10; 02:33:35	3777	5007±2073	H,L	4.4 10^{−8}	0.920	0.0	0.0	0.926	0.041	0.033		
S250202cu	2025-02-02; 18:49:02	4768	5196±2263	H,L	1.5 10^{−8}	0.568	0.0	0.0	0.948	0.042	0.0099		
S250204ax	2025-02-04; 05:52:59	318	2056±690	H,L,V	3.2 10^{−10}	0.018	0.0	0.0	0.99974	0.0	0.00026		
S250205bk	2025-02-05; 10:35:41	64; towards western Hydra	748±160	H,L,V	9.5 10^{−10}	0.053	0.0	0.014	0.970	0.00815	0.0072		
S250205ee	2025-02-05; 21:52:15	1574	2493±889	H,L	1.8 10^{−9}	0.100	0.0	0.0	0.998	0.0	0.0017		
S250206dm	2025-02-06; 21:25:30	547	373±104	H,L	1.3 10^{−9}	0.070	0.143	0.211	0.0	0.568	0.077	The other component is a neutron star.	
S250207bg	2025-02-07; 11:56:45	80	508±95	L,V	4.9 10^{−36}	0.0	0.0	0.0	~1.0	0.0	0.0		
S250208ad	2025-02-08; 03:51:06	1128	4871±1417	H,L,V	3.8 10^{−10}	0.021	0.0	0.0	0.99956	0.0	0.00044		
S250211aa	2025-02-11; 02:25:46	248	1121±258	H,L,V	4.7 10^{−18}	0.0	0.0	0.0	0.990	0.010	3.2e−11		
S250211be	2025-02-11; 04:35:43	91; towards Leo or Ursa Major	3337±1194	H,L,V	1.8 10^{−8}	0.641	0.0	0.0	0.987	0.0	0.013		
S250226dl	2025-02-26; 22:48:38	1218	3361±1041	H,L	1.2 10^{−12}	6.7 10^{−5}	0.0	0.0	~1.0	0.0	2.4e−5		
S250227e	2025-02-27; 00:13:02	210	2004±524	H,L,V	2.6 10^{−12}	0.00015	0.0	0.0	~1.0	0.0	4.0e−6		
S250304cb	2025-03-04; 06:22:45	1569	1768±541	H,L,V	5.6 10^{−8}	0.960	0.0	0.0	0.944	0.018	0.038		
S250319bu	2025-03-19; 06:25:36	989	4713±1546	H,L,V	4.7 10^{−10}	0.027	0.0	0.0	0.99954	0.0	0.00046		
S250326y	2025-03-26; 01:54:06	1460	5412±1720	H,L,V	3.6 10^{−12}	0.00020	0.0	0.0	~1.0	0.0	6.2e−6		
S250328ae	2025-03-28; 05:40:27	14; towards southwestern Leo	511±82	H,L,V	3.2 10^{−10}	0.018	0.0	0.0	0.934	0.065	0.00151		
S250331o	2025-03-31; 01:34:48	18; towards Triangulum	657±91	H,L,V	3.2 10^{−10}	0.018	0.0	0.0	0.99972	0.0	0.00028		
S250628am	2025-06-28; 18:23:19	287	902±223	H,L,V	1.7 10^{−14}	9.7 10^{−7}	0.0	0.0	~1.0	0.0	4.6e−8		
S250629ae	2025-06-29; 05:50:36	2834	7075±2116	H,L,V	3.2 10^{−8}	0.844	0.0	0.0	0.978	0.0	0.022		
S250629bs	2025-06-29; 12:13:04	3008	4847±1746	H,L	4.3 10^{−8}	0.917	0.0	0.0	0.940	0.0	0.060		
S250701bp	2025-07-01; 20:34:40	26503	939±300	L	3.1 10^{−17}	0.0	0.0	0.0	~1.0	0.0	1.8e−10	Detected by only the Livingston detector, resulting in a bad sky localization. Chirp mass 99.98% likely to be between 22 and 44 Solar masses.	
S250701bq	2025-07-01; 23:17:46	25010	480±118	L	4.3 10^{−17}	0.0	0.0	0.0	~1.0	0.0	2.2e−10	Detected by only the Livingston detector, resulting in a bad sky localization. Chirp mass 93.7% likely to be between 11 and 22 Solar masses.	
S250702n	2025-07-02; 13:32:00	1758	2180±913	H,L	1.8 10^{−8}	0.633	0.0	0.0	0.989	0.0	0.011	Chirp mass 89.3% likely to be between 22 and 44 Solar masses (11-22 10.7%)	
S250704ab	2025-07-04; 04:30:48	43.7; towards central Auriga	531±101	H,L,V	3.2 10^{−10}	0.018	0.0	0.149	0.824	0.144	0.0020	Chirp mass 99.999% likely to be between 5.5 and 11 Solar masses	
S250705cb	2025-07-05; 16:29:56	333	1143±299	H,L,V	9.5 10^{−10}	0.050	0.0	0.0	0.995	0.0	0.0054	Chirp mass 86.2% likely to be between 5.5 and 11 Solar masses (11-22 13.6%)	
S250711q	2025-07-11; 03:27:25	2016	4756±2023	H,L,V	1.6 10^{−9}	0.086	0.0	0.0	0.9986	0.0	0.0014	Chirp mass 59.0% likely to be between 22 and 44 Solar masses (44-88 41.0%)	
S250712cd	2025-07-12; 14:25:32	155; towards border of Cygnus and Draco	2439±870	H,L,V	2.7 10^{−11}	0.0015	0.0	0.0	0.99989	0.0	0.00011	Chirp mass 99.87% likely to be between 22 and 44 Solar masses	
S250725j	2025-07-25; 04:09:44	18.6; towards northern Lupus	380±93	H,L,V	4.3 10^{−11}	0.0024	0.0	0.0	0.99995	0.0	5.3e−5	Chirp mass 99.98% likely to be between 11 and 22 Solar masses	
S250725l	2025-07-25; 04:20:50	1532	2567±766	H,L,V	3.0 10^{−8}	0.819	0.0	0.0	0.985	0.00062	0.015	Chirp mass 98.9% likely to be between 11 and 22 Solar masses	
S250726ak	2025-07-26; 08:28:15	361	3333±1448	H,L,V	4.7 10^{−12}	0.00027	0.0	0.0	0.99998	0.0	2.3e−5	Chirp mass 99.2% likely to be between 22 and 44 Solar masses	
S250727cl	2025-07-27; 18:03:29	205; mostly towards Eastern Cancer	2152±515	H,L,V	4.0 10^{−20}	0.0	0.0	0.0	~1.0	0.0	0.0	Chirp mass 74.2% likely to be between 22 and 44 Solar masses (11-22 25.8%)	
S250727dc	2025-07-27; 20:01:48	15.4; towards eastern Columba	1389±318	H,L,V	1.1 10^{−18}	0.0	0.0	0.0	~1.0	0.0	8.2e−12	Chirp mass 99.999% likely to be between 22 and 44 Solar masses	
S250802dn	2025-08-02; 20:25:12	3209	3070±1219	H,L	5.5 10^{−8}	0.957	0.0	0.0	0.927	0.0	0.073	Chirp mass 91.1% likely to be between 22 and 44 Solar masses	
S250810ck	2025-08-10; 14:23:57	180	621±129	H,V	5.4 10^{−20}	0.0	0.0	0.00053	0.905	0.094	4.4e−13	Chirp mass 100% likely to be between 5.5 and 11 Solar masses	
S250813k	2025-08-13; 02:12:00	12; towards border of Ursa Major, Camelopardalis, and Draco	932±209	H,L,V	1.3 10^{−10}	0.0072	0.0	0.0	0.997	0.0	0.0029	Chirp mass 99.993% likely to be between 22 and 44 Solar masses	
S250818t	2025-08-18; 02:08:58	319	1209±290	H,L,V	1.7 10^{−11}	0.00099	0.0	0.0	0.983	0.0174	7.4e−5	Chirp mass 54.0% likely to be between 5.5 and 11 Solar masses (11-22 46.0%)	
S250827l	2025-08-27; 01:27:57	615	2464±700	H,L,V	3.2 10^{−10}	0.018	0.0	0.0	0.99998	0.0	2.0e−5	Chirp mass 87.8% likely to be between 22 and 44 Solar masses (11-22 12.2%)	
S250827fo	2025-08-27; 22:29:40	470	1005±261	H,L,V	2.3 10^{−11}	0.0013	0.0	0.0	0.943	0.057	9.2e−5	Chirp mass 92.5% likely to be between 5.5 and 11 Solar masses	
S250830m	2025-08-30; 03:27:09	3194	3731±1474	H,L	1.2 10^{−8}	0.495	0.0	0.0	0.979	0.0	0.021	Chirp mass 99.7% likely to be between 22 and 44 Solar masses	
S250830bp	2025-08-30; 10:24:18	3.73; towards Nu Octantis	427±69	H,L,V	3.2 10^{−10}	0.018	0.0	0.132	0.702	0.165	0.0017	Chirp mass 99.8% likely to be between 5.5 and 11 Solar masses	
S250901cb	2025-09-01; 18:59:41	581	2018±482	H,L,V	3.2 10^{−14}	1.8 10^{−6}	0.0	0.0	~1.0	0.0	9.5e−8	Chirp mass 100% likely to be between 11 and 22 Solar masses	
S250904ae	2025-09-04; 03:33:07	1021	3330±863	H,L,V	3.2 10^{−10}	0.018	0.0	0.0	0.99999	0.0	1.3e−5	Chirp mass 71.2% likely to be between 11 and 22 Solar masses (22-44 28.8%)	
S250904br	2025-09-04; 10:22:08	373	2748±681	H,L,V	3.2 10^{−10}	0.018	0.0	0.0	0.99998	0.0	2.0e−5	Chirp mass 100% likely to be between 22 and 44 Solar masses	
S250904cv	2025-09-04; 13:49:52	1237	2414±670	H,L	3.2 10^{−10}	0.018	0.0	0.0	0.99968	0.0	0.00032	Chirp mass 99.6% likely to be between 11 and 22 Solar masses	
S250906ca	2025-09-06; 12:23:59	520	1195±307	H,L,V	1.1 10^{−13}	6.3 10^{−6}	0.0	0.00055	0.942	0.058	3.1e−7	Chirp mass 100% likely to be between 5.5 and 11 Solar masses	
S250908y	2025-09-08; 14:34:28	11002	1280±403	H,V	1.2 10^{−10}	0.0077	0.0	0.0	0.998	0.0023	0.00015	Chirp mass 81.3% likely to be between 5.5 and 11 Solar masses (11-22 18.7%)	
S250911ac	2025-09-11; 07:46:39	1012	1102±300	H,L	6.0 10^{−9}	0.292	0.0	0.118	0.779	0.067	0.036	Chirp mass 100% likely to be between 5.5 and 11 Solar masses	
S250912f	2025-09-12; 06:40:08	393	2870±784	L,V	2.9 10^{−13}	1.7 10^{−5}	0.0	0.0	~1.0	0.0	6.8e−7	Chirp mass 99.4% likely to be between 44 and 88 Solar masses	
S250917aq	2025-09-17; 13:21:54	5646	687±182	H,V	1.1 10^{−13}	6.3 10^{−6}	0.0	0.00045	0.972	0.027	3.1e−7	Chirp mass 100% likely to be between 5.5 and 11 Solar masses	
S250927ck	2025-09-27; 15:24:48	177	4333±1544	H,L,V	3.1 10^{−8}	0.835	0.0	0.0	0.978	0.0	0.022	Chirp mass 88.5% likely to be between 44 and 88 Solar masses (22-44 11.1%)	
S250927cy	2025-09-27; 17:30:41	1551	4064±1180	H,L,V	5.3 10^{−8}	0.953	0.0	0.0	0.962	0.0	0.038	Chirp mass 91.5% likely to be between 22 and 44 Solar masses (11-22 8.5%)	
S250929c	2025-09-29; 00:27:32	1828	3796±1511	H,L,V	2.5 10^{−8}	0.766	0.0	0.0	0.983	0.0	0.017	Chirp mass 89.3% likely to be between 22 and 44 Solar masses (11-22 10.6%)	
S251006dd	2025-10-06; 23:37:17	109	706±151	H,L,V	5.4 10^{−16}	3.2 10^{−8}	0.0	0.0023	0.862	0.136	7.0e−7	Chirp mass 100% likely to be between 5.5 and 11 Solar masses	
S251013x	2025-10-13; 02:44:14	1589	1946±505	H,L,V	1.5 10^{−8}	0.574	0.0	0.0	0.990	0.0	0.010	Chirp mass 100% likely to be between 22 and 44 Solar masses	
S251014cn	2025-10-14; 11:33:23	172	607±164	H,L	3.2 10^{−10}	0.018	0.0	0.0	0.99820	0.0	0.0018	Chirp mass 93.8% likely to be between 11 and 22 Solar masses	
S251018bi	2025-10-18; 15:25:47	1463	5450±1489	H,L,V	3.2 10^{−10}	0.018	0.0	0.0	0.99999	0.0	6.7e−6	Chirp mass 61.8% likely to be between 22 and 44 Solar masses (44-88 38.2%)	
S251021u	2025-10-21; 03:22:15	3859	5884±2089	H,L	2.2 10^{−9}	0.120	0.0	0.0	0.99992	0.0	8.2e−5	Chirp mass 59.7% likely to be between 44 and 88 Solar masses (22-44 40.3%)	
S251026bn	2025-10-26; 21:16:05	744	1202±347	H,L	4.8 10^{−12}	0.00028	0.0	0.0	0.924	0.076	8.2e−6	Chirp mass 100% likely to be between 5.5 and 11 Solar masses	
S251031cq	2025-10-31; 18:59:15	709	2083±562	H,L,V	7.0 10^{−10}	0.039	0.0	0.0	0.99937	0.0	0.00063	Chirp mass 98.8% likely to be between 22 and 44 Solar masses	
S251031dw	2025-10-31; 21:07:49	764	?	H,L	3.1 10^{−8}	0.833	0.0	0.0	0.0	0.0	?	Unidentified gravitational wave "burst" lasting 20 milliseconds at a frequency of tens of Hertz.	
S251103f	2025-11-03; 22:05:26	981	2158±568	H,L,V	4.2 10^{−14}	2.4 10^{−6}	0.0	0.0	~1.0	0.0	1.3e−7	Chirp mass 100% likely to be between 11 and 22 Solar masses	
S251105aj	2025-11-05; 12:59:19	721	2071±545	H,L,V	8.0 10^{−13}	4.6 10^{−5}	0.0	0.0	~1.0	0.0	4.9e−6	Chirp mass 98.2% likely to be between 22 and 44 Solar masses	
S251108dn	2025-11-08; 10:32:43	697	1165±309	H,L,V	9.4 10^{−18}	0.0	0.0	9.2e−5	0.979	0.021	5.8e−11	Chirp mass 100% likely to be between 5.5 and 11 Solar masses	
S251108fi	2025-11-08; 19:13:28	1524	3537±1032	H,L,V	1.3 10^{−12}	7.5 10^{−5}	0.0	0.0	~1.0	0.0	2.8e−6	Chirp mass 63.9% likely to be between 22 and 44 Solar masses (11-22 36.1%)	
S251112cm	2025-11-12; 15:18:45	1220	96±29	H,L,V	5.1 10^{−9}	0.254	~1.0	0.0	0.0	0.0	?	Chirp mass 100% likely to be between 0.1 and 0.87 Solar masses. Although marked as a BNS merger, this event falls in the "sub-solar mass" category and may represent a different object type.	
S251116en	2025-11-16; 23:22:21	788	1741±490	H,L	1.3 10^{−12}	7.5 10^{−5}	0.0	0.0	0.99998	0.0	1.8e−5	Chirp mass 100% likely to be between 22 and 44 Solar masses	
S251117dq	2025-11-17; 21:38:33	1701	2201±621	H,L	5.9 10^{−15}	3.4 10^{−7}	0.0	0.0	~1.0	0.0	2.2e-8	Chirp mass 100% likely to be between 22 and 44 Solar masses	

== See also ==
- GRB 150101B, a weak gamma-ray burst trigger observed prior to LIGO O1 (beginning September 12, 2015), with claimed similarities to neutron star merger GW170817/GRB 170817A/AT2017gfo.
