= Golden binary =

Binary black hole collision event

Gravitational wave signal GW250114, the clearest gravitational wave signal discovered as of 2025.

In gravitational wave astronomy, a golden binary is a binary black hole collision event whose inspiral and ringdown phases have been measured accurately enough to provide separate measurements of the initial and final black hole masses.

== Testing general relativity ==
Current LIGO/Virgo protocol relies on its library of several hundred thousand precomputed templates of black hole collisions conceivably detectable in their frequency range. A putative binary black hole collision signal consists of inspiral, merger, and ringdown phases. The complete signal is compared with the template library, and event parameters and significance are based on an analysis of such matches.

This allows for self-consistency checks of general relativity. In order to test certain competing theories of gravity, one faces the problem that only general relativity has been studied enough that the complete merger phase is known. Therefore, only a signal that can be matched separately in the inspiral and ringdown phases can be used to allow or contradict such theories.

== Identified golden binaries ==
GW150914 was a golden binary, indeed, this led to additional internal checks done by LIGO. GW151226 and LVT151012 were not.
