= Norna Robertson =

Professor of experimental physics

- Education: University of Glasgow
- Awards: President's Medal of the Royal Society of Edinburgh, California Institute of Technology Staff Service and Impact Award
- Scientific career
- Fields: Gravitational waves, experimental physics
- Workplaces: LIGO, California Institute of Technology, University of Glasgow
- Thesis: Experiments relating to the detection of gravitational radiation and to the suppression of seismic noise in sensitive measurements (1981)
- Doctoral advisor: Ron Drever and Jim Hough

Norna Robertson is a Scottish physicist. She is a lead scientist at LIGO at California Institute of Technology, and professor of experimental physics at the University of Glasgow. Her career has focused on experimental research into suspension systems and instrumentation to achieve the detection of gravitational waves.

== Education ==
Robertson obtained a Ph.D. in experimental physics in 1981 from the University of Glasgow, researching gravitational wave detection and how seismic noise could be suppressed in sensitive measurements.

== Research and career ==
Robertson began her postdoctoral career as a researcher at Imperial College London studying infrared astronomy. In 1983, she joined the University of Glasgow as a lecturer and returned to gravitational waves research, becoming a Professor in 1999.

In 2003, Robertson moved to the Gintzon Laboratory at Stanford University as a visiting professor, where her work focused on suspension systems for Advanced LIGO. She became a lead scientist at the LIGO at California Institute of Technology in 2007, leading an international team of 20 scientists and engineers. Her research contributed to the design of detection instrumentation that ultimately led to the first observation of gravitational waves in 2015. Her work is now focused on the development of ultra-low noise suspensions systems for Advanced LIGO.

== Awards and honours ==
Robertson was awarded the President's Medal from the Royal Society of Edinburgh in 2016 for her work on suspension systems for gravitational wave detection. She received the California Institute of Technology Staff Service and Impact Award in 2017.

She is a Fellow of the Royal Society of Edinburgh, the American Physical Society, the Royal Astronomical Society, the Institute of Physics, and the International Society on General Relativity and Gravitation.
