= Fermilab Holometer =

Laser interferometer at Fermilab

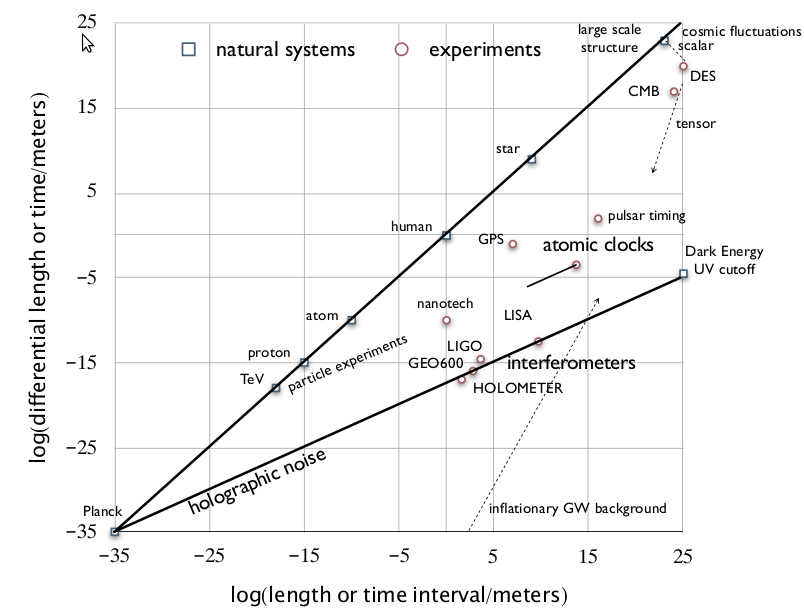
The sensitivity of various experiments to fluctuations in space and time. Horizontal axis is the log of apparatus size (or duration times the speed of light), in meters; vertical axis is the log of the RMS fluctuation amplitude in the same units.

The Fermilab Holometer, based at Fermilab in Illinois was a laser interferometer intended to be the world's most sensitive, surpassing the sensitivity of the GEO600 and LIGO systems, and theoretically able to detect holographic fluctuations in spacetime.

According to the director of the project, the Holometer should be capable of detecting fluctuations in light of a single attometer, meeting or exceeding the sensitivity required to detect the smallest units in the universe, called Planck units. Fermilab stated: "Everyone is familiar these days with the blurry and pixelated images, or noisy sound transmission, associated with poor internet bandwidth. The Holometer seeks to detect the equivalent blurriness or noise in reality itself, associated with the ultimate frequency limit imposed by nature."

In 2015 Fermilab announced that the study had found that space-time is not quantized at the scale being measured.

== Background ==
Craig Hogan, a particle astrophysicist at Fermilab, stated about the experiment, "What we’re looking for is when the lasers lose step with each other. We’re trying to detect the smallest unit in the universe. This is really great fun, a sort of old-fashioned physics experiment where you don’t know what the result will be."

Experimental physicist Hartmut Grote of the Max Planck Institute in Germany stated that although he was skeptical that the apparatus would successfully detect the holographic fluctuations, if the experiment is successful "it would be a very strong impact to one of the most open questions in fundamental physics. It would be the first proof that space-time, the fabric of the universe, is quantized."

Holometer had started in 2014, collecting data that would help determine whether the universe fits the holographic principle. The hypothesis that holographic noise may be observed in this manner has been criticized on the grounds that the theoretical framework used to derive the noise violates Lorentz invariance. Lorentz invariance violation is however very strongly constrained already, an issue that has been very unsatisfactorily addressed in the mathematical treatment.

The Fermilab holometer has found also other uses than studying the holographic fluctuations of spacetime. It has shown constraints on the existence of high-frequency gravitational waves and primordial black holes.

== Experimental description ==
The Holometer consisted of two 39 m arm-length power-recycled Michelson interferometers, similar to the LIGO instruments. The interferometers were able to be operated in two spatial configurations, termed "nested" and "back-to-back". According to Hogan's hypothesis, in the nested configuration the interferometers' beamsplitters should appear to wander in step with each other (that is, the wandering should be correlated); conversely, in the back-to-back configuration any wandering of the beamsplitters should be uncorrelated. The presence or absence of the correlated wandering effect in each configuration can be determined by cross-correlating the interferometers' outputs.

The experiment started one year of data collection in August 2014. A paper about the project titled Now Broadcasting in Planck Definition by Craig Hogan ends with the statement "We don't know what we will find."

== Results ==
A new result of the experiment released on December 3, 2015, after a year of data collection, has ruled out Hogan's theory of a pixelated universe to a high degree of statistical significance (4.6 sigma). The study found that space-time is not quantized at the scale being measured.

Based on what the authors call the "final measurements and analysis [...] from the first-generation Holometer" it was reported in 2017 that it "has tested and conclusively excluded a general class of models of quantum geometrical shear noise correlations".

An upgraded version of the holometer was used in 2020 to probe models in which the correlations are seen in rotational degrees of freedom. The results were consistent with a classical spacetime, constraining the tested models.
