= GW250114 =

Gravitational-wave event

- GW250114's signal at Hanford and Livingston
- Event type: Gravitational wave
- Date: c. 1.14 billion years ago (detected January 14, 2025, 8:22:03 UTC)
- Duration: c. 230 milliseconds
- Instrument: LIGO
- Distance: c. 1.14 billion ly
- Redshift: 0.09+0.01 −0.01
- Progenitor: 2 black holes
- Total energy output: 3.1±2.2 M_{☉}c^{2}

GW250114 was a black hole merger detected by LIGO on January 14, 2025. It generated the clearest gravitational wave signal received to date, with a signal-to-noise ratio (SNR) of about 77–80, far clearer than the 42 SNR of the previous best gravitational wave observation (of GW230814). It identified (with a 4.1σ level of significance) the first overtone of the Kerr solution for a rotating black hole. The findings were corroborated in a September 2025 scientific article.

The discovery is empirical confirmation of Stephen Hawking's area theorem of 1971. It states that even though black holes lose energy from gravitational waves and increasing angular momentum (spin), which can reduce surface area, the total surface area of two merged black holes must increase or remain the same.

== History ==
=== LIGO O4 run ===
LIGO mixes observation runs with facility upgrades. Each run is typically split into two or three subruns, for smaller fixes. The fourth observation run (O4) ran (O4a) from May 24, 2023, until January 16, 2024, then (O4b) from April 10, 2024 until January 28, 2025, and a third subrun begun on June 11, 2025, scheduled to end November 2025. GW250114 was detected near the end of the O4b subrun.

=== Detection and basic analysis ===
On January 14, 2025, both of LIGO's interferometers (one in Hanford, Washington and one in Livingston, Louisiana) were operating, but those of its partners Virgo and KAGRA were not. Just after 08:22:03 UTC, the LIGO interferometers registered nearly identical gravitational wave signals, with parts of the signal having SNR above 10σ.

The signal matched that of two black holes, one of mass 33.6+1.2
−0.8 M_{☉} and the other of mass 32.2+0.8
−1.3 M_{☉}, with merged mass 62.7+1.0
−1.1 M_{☉}. The energy released was 3.1±2.2 M_{☉}c^{2}.

Both were low-spin, at most circa 0.25 of the maximum possible spin. The merged spin was 0.68+0.01
−0.01 of the maximum possible spin.

== Noise reduction ==
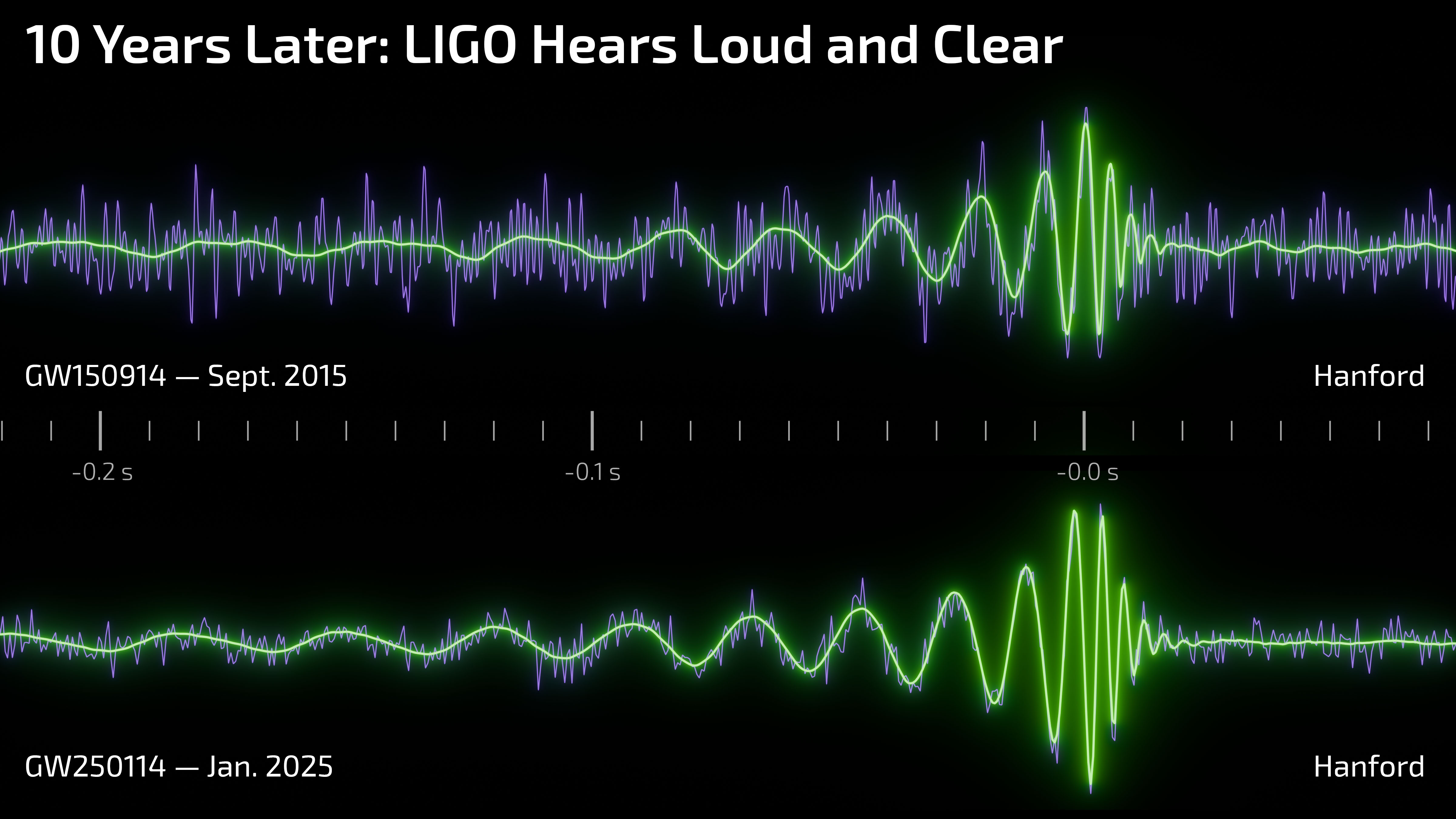
Two black hole mergers detected 10 years apart. Illustrates the reduction in noise achieved by upgrades during that time.

GW250114's measurement has a signal-to-noise ratio (SNR) of 80, achieved by combination of both LIGO detectors' record SNR measurements and much cleaner than the SNR of 26 from the first observation of a gravitational wave (GW150914) a decade earlier. Noise reduction accelerates the rate at which new black hole mergers are discovered, and captures detailed data that expand the scope of what is learned about the fundamental properties of black holes.

As a new black hole stabilizes, it emits reverberating gravitational waves, a stage called its ringdown. Through the pitch and decay of the measured two signal harmonics (overtones), the black hole's mass and spin can be observationally measured. While scientists were unable to distinguish more than a single harmonic in the ringdown from the black holes' collision with the far-fainter 2015 signal, they were able to with GW250114, resulting from data with a far higher SNR.

== Significance ==
=== Previous evidence ===
Previous observations of black hole mergers, from the original 2015 black hole merger and later have been consistent with the no-hair theorem and Hawking area theorem. However, the low signal-to-noise ratio of these signals meant that more precise conclusions were not possible. The much-improved signal-to-noise ratio of LIGO has made it possible to start claiming confirmation for these theoretical predictions.

==== Uniqueness of black holes ====
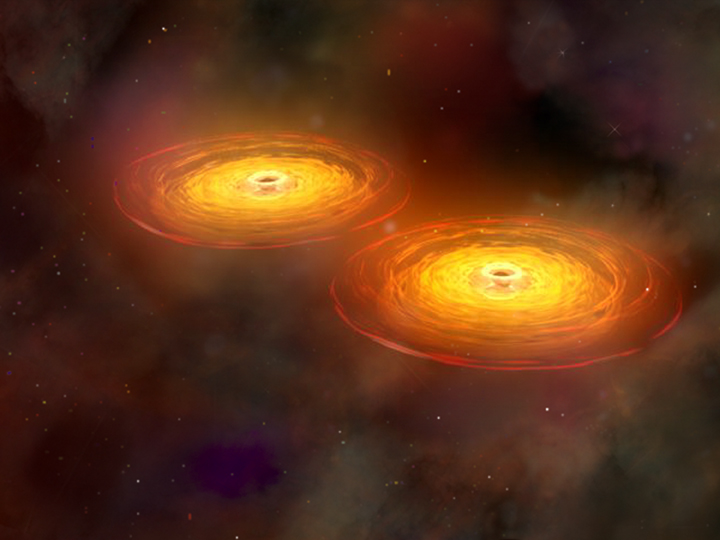
Artist's depiction of a black hole merger

Black holes as described in Einstein's general relativity, are completely characterized by their mass, angular momentum or spin, and electric charge. Masses of black holes are measured in terms of the mass of the Sun, or solar mass. The dimensionless spin parameter is between 0 and 1, where 0 denotes zero angular momentum, and 1 denotes the maximum angular momentum possible for the given mass. Astrophysical black holes are generally thought to be electrically neutral, meaning the charge is taken to be 0. If the charge and spin are zero, the black hole is described by the Schwarzschild metric, with one free parameter, the mass. When only the charge is zero, the black hole is described by the Kerr metric, which depends on two parameters, the mass and the spin. The assertion that a single black hole in an otherwise empty universe is completely described by its mass, spin, and charge is known as the no-hair theorem.

In contrast, a neutron star's gravitational field is sensitive to the exact internal assemblage of the interior neutron matter, and possibly tiny "mountains" (a few centimeters tall) that would radiate gravitational waves if the neutron star were spinning (a gravitational "pulsar").

Deviations from it are possible, but only under extreme conditions. A binary black hole collision and merger is one such situation. From just before the collision to shortly after the merger, a complicated geometry is present, but it quickly radiates away any perturbations from a spherical shape, sending out gravitational waves and settling down to a no-hair black hole. (See Price's theorem.) Like all waves, these can be described in terms of a fundamental vibration modified by higher frequency, lesser amplitude overtones.

==== Hawking's area theorem ====
Although it has been possible since 2005 to calculate what happens in any given merger (using methods developed by Frans Pretorius and others), no abstract solution that can be written down as a formula is known. As a consequence, many properties of the post-merger black hole can be inferred from computer simulations, but can not be strictly proven mathematically. In the 1970s, Roger Penrose and Stephen Hawking found mathematical proofs that describe one aspect of the combined black hole that can be derived from Einstein's field equations. In particular, while the dynamics of merging of black holes may be complicated (such as energy being radiated away in the form of gravitational waves, and that the spin increasing in the merged, which in turn can reduce the surface area), Hawking proved mathematically that the total surface area of the merged black hole must grow in size in the merger or remain the same. This similarity is key in ongoing attempts to develop a theory of quantum gravity.

Whereas the two black holes had a total surface area of about 240000 square kilometers (around the size of the United Kingdom), the final black hole sized about 400000 square kilometers (around the size of Sweden).

=== Results from data analysis ===
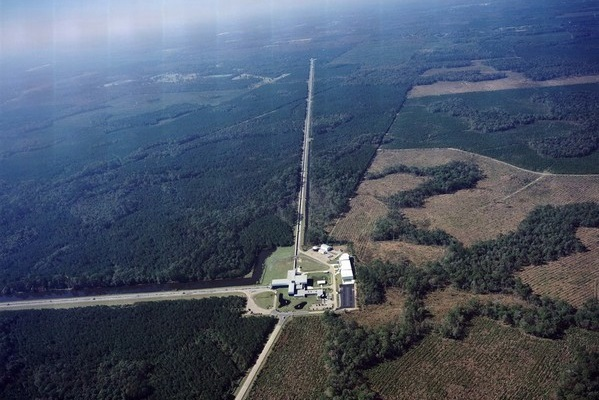
The LIGO Livingston Observatory in 2009

Gravitational-wave astronomy is based on matching signals detected by an interferometer with waveform computations simulating black hole collisions (or other wave emitting scenarios). In particular, LIGO and VIRGO have strongly limited non-Einsteinian theories of gravitation. Nevertheless, a complete first-principles predictions of the signal emitted by a black hole collision remains unknown; only simplified solutions for the early and late portions of the signal have been obtained. Even so, seeing new details of the Einsteinian predictions are considered strong confirmations. Before GW250114, confirmations of the broad aspects of black holes in general relativity had been found, and a useful catalog of black hole mergers obtained. Upgrades to LIGO for O4 enabled a greater precision in identifying signals, which has led to greater precision in the corresponding waveform analysis. There were hints of Kerr overtones and the Hawking area theorem, but the error bars prevented any definite claim.

GW250114 was loud enough that the first Kerr overtone was seen with high confidence, and higher overtones with some. Hawking's area theorem, in this case asserting that the merged area is greater than the sum of the two colliding black holes' areas, was confirmed. Further analysis tightened the error bars on measurements, and further constrained any possible deviations from the predictions of general relativity.

GW250114 provides strong evidence that black holes are accurately described by general relativity. The merger was the clearest ever detected at the time of discovery.

== See also ==
- First observation of gravitational waves
- GW231123, another large gravitational-wave event detected two years earlier
- List of gravitational wave observations
