= GW170608 =

Gravitational-wave event

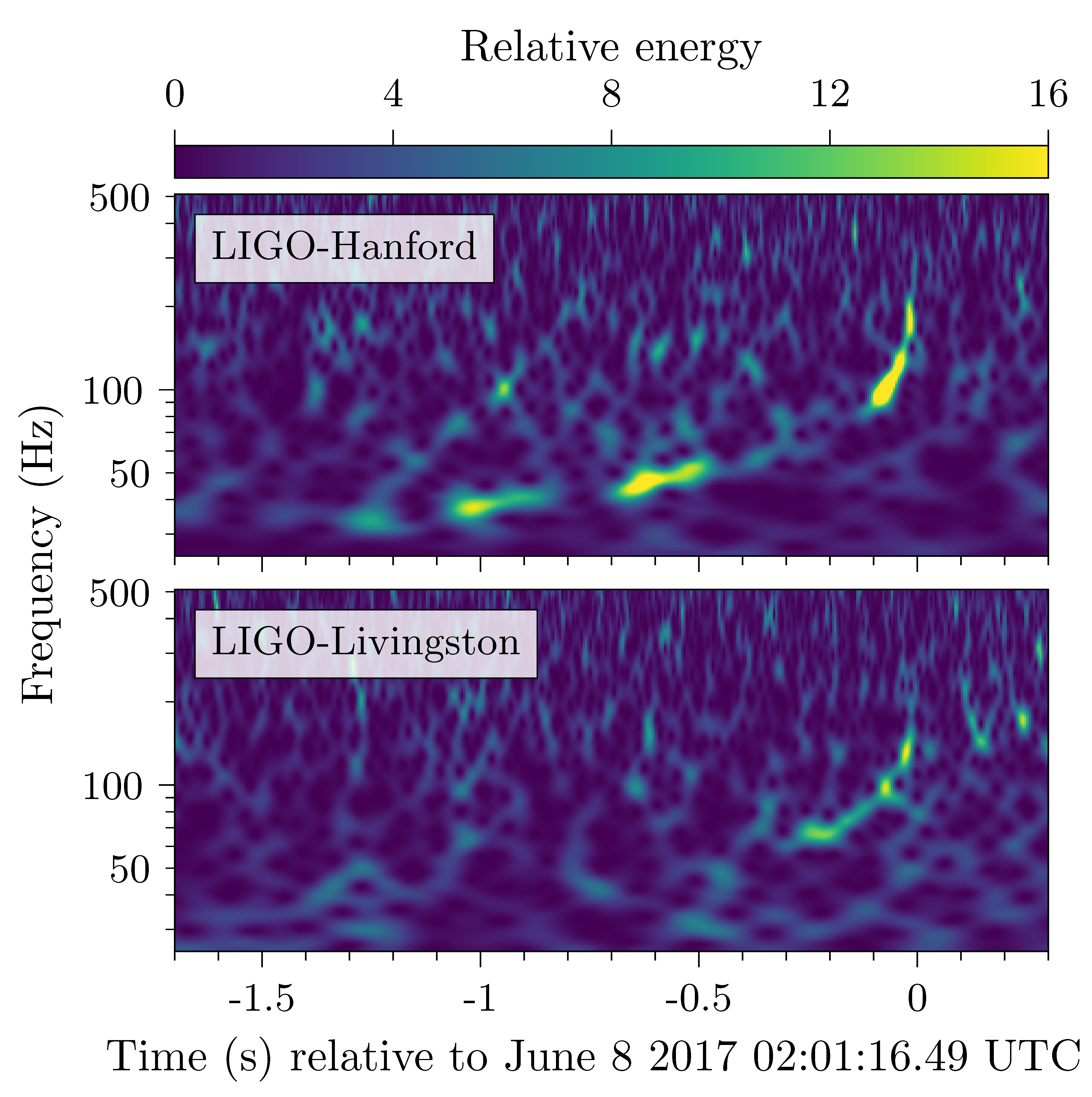
- The GW170608 signal as measured by the LIGO gravitational wave detectors
- Event type: Gravitational wave event
- Distance: 340 Mpc (1.1×10^{9} ly)
- Other designations: GW170608

GW170608 was a gravitational wave event that was recorded on 8 June 2017 at 02:01:16.49 UTC by Advanced LIGO. It originated from the merger of two black holes with masses of 12+7
−2 M_{☉} and 7+2
−2 M_{☉}. The resulting black hole had a mass around 18 solar masses. About one solar mass was converted to energy in the form of gravitational waves.

== Event detection ==
The signal was not detected by automated analyses, as the Hanford instrument was undergoing tests at specific frequencies and data from the instrument was not being analyzed. The signal was initially identified by visual inspection of triggers from the Livingston detector. Manual follow-up with the Hanford data revealed a coincident signal. Subsequent investigations determined that the ongoing tests of the Hanford instrument did not affect the recovery of the signal from the Hanford data.

== Announcement ==
This was the first gravitational wave detection where the scientific article announcing the discovery was posted on the electronic preprint arXiv server before the paper was accepted for publication by the journal.
