= PyCBC =

Software used in gravitational-wave astronomy

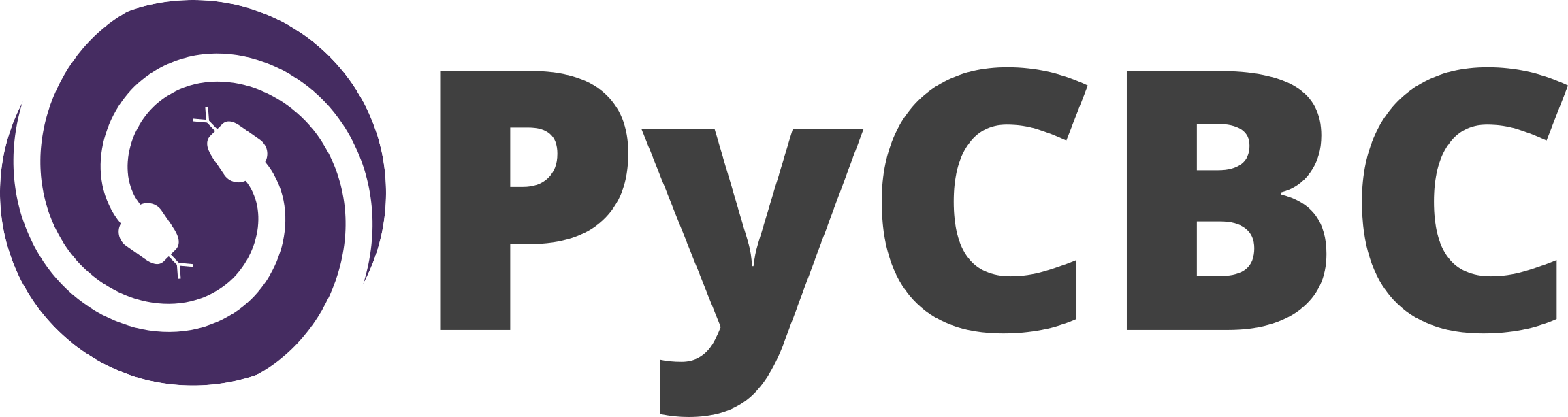
- Developers: PyCBC Team and LIGO / Virgo Collaborations
- Stable release: 2.10.0 / October 26, 2025
- Written in: Python
- Operating system: Linux, Mac OS X, Windows
- Type: Scientific computing
- License: GNU General Public License, version 3.0
- Website: https://pycbc.org/
- Repository: https://github.com/gwastro/pycbc

PyCBC is a free and open-source software package primarily written in the Python programming language which is designed for use in gravitational-wave astronomy and gravitational-wave data analysis. PyCBC contains modules for signal processing, fast Fourier transforms, matched filtering, gravitational waveform generation, among other tasks common in gravitational-wave data analysis.

The software is developed by the gravitational-wave community alongside LIGO and Virgo scientists to analyze gravitational-wave data, search for gravitational-waves, and to measure the properties of astrophysical sources. It has been used to analyze gravitational-wave data from LIGO and VIRGO to detect gravitational-waves from the mergers of neutron stars and black holes and determine their statistical significance. PyCBC-based analyses can integrate with the Open Science Grid for large scale computing resources. Software based on PyCBC has been used to rapidly analyze gravitational-wave data for astronomical follow-up.

== See also ==
- List of numerical analysis software
- LIGO Scientific Collaboration
- European Gravitational Observatory
