= Heinz Billing =

German physicist (1914–2017)

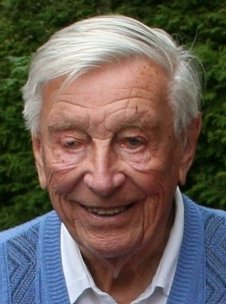
- Heinz Billing in 2012
- Born: 7 April 1914; Salzwedel, Saxony-Anhalt, Germany
- Died: 4 January 2017 (aged 102); Garching bei München, Bavaria, Germany
- Education: University of Göttingen
- Known for: Prototype laser interferometric gravitational wave detector Data storage device
- Awards: Konrad Zuse Medal (1987)
- Scientific career
- Fields: Physics; Computer science Experimental Gravitation
- Workplaces: Aerodynamic Test Centre at Göttingen; Max Planck Institute for Astrophysics; Max Planck Institute for Physics
- Doctoral advisor: Walter Gerlach; Eduard Rüchardt

Heinz Billing (7 April 1914 – 4 January 2017) was a German physicist and computer scientist, widely considered a pioneer in the construction of computer systems and computer data storage, who built a prototype laser interferometric gravitational wave detector.

== Biography ==
Billing was born in Salzwedel, in Saxony-Anhalt, Germany. After studying mathematics and physics in University of Göttingen he received his doctorate in 1938 in Munich at the age of 24. During the Second World War he worked in the Aerodynamics Research Institute in Göttingen.

On 3 October 1943 he married Anneliese Oetker. Billing has three children: Heiner Erhard Billing (born 18 November 1944 in Salzwedel), Dorit Gerda Gronefeld Billing (born 27 June 1946 in Göttingen) and Arend Gerd Billing (born 19 September 1954 in Göttingen).

He turned 100 in April 2014 and died on 4 January 2017 at the age of 102. Advanced LIGO detected the fourth gravitational wave event GW170104 on the same day.

== Computer science ==
Billing worked at the Aerodynamic Research Institute in Göttingen, where he developed a magnetic drum memory.

According to Billing's memoirs, published by Genscher, Düsseldorf (1997), there was a meeting between Alan Turing and Konrad Zuse. It took place in Göttingen in 1947. The interrogation had the form of a colloquium. Participants were Womersley, Turing, Porter from England and a few German researchers like Zuse, Walther, and Billing. (For more details see Herbert Bruderer, Konrad Zuse und die Schweiz).

After a brief stay at the University of Sydney, Billing returned to join the Max Planck Institute for Physics in 1951. From 1952 through 1961 the group under Billing's direction constructed a series of four digital computers: the G1, G2, G1a, and G3.

He is the designer of the first German sequence-controlled electronic digital computer as well as of the first German stored-program electronic digital computer.

== Gravitational wave detector ==
After transistors had been firmly established, when microelectronics arrived, after scientific computers were slowly overshadowed by commercial applications and computers were mass-produced in factories, Heinz Billing left the computer field in which he had been a pioneer for nearly 30 years.

In 1972, Billing returned to his original field of physics, at the Max Planck Institute's new location at Garching near Munich. Beginning in 1972, Heinz Billing became involved in gravitational physics, when he tried to verify the detection claims made by American physicist Joseph Weber. Weber's results were considered to be proven wrong by these experiments.

In 1975, Billing acted on a proposal by Rainer Weiss from the Massachusetts Institute of technology (MIT) to use laser interferometry to detect gravitational waves. He and colleagues built a 3m prototype Michelson interferometer using optical delay lines. From 1980 onward Billing commissioned the development and construction in MPA in Garching of a laser interferometer with an arm length of 30m. The knowledge gained from this prototype was crucial to beginning the LIGO project.

== Awards and honors ==
In 1987, Heinz Billing received the Konrad Zuse Medal for the invention of magnetic drum storage. In 2015 he received the Order of Merit of the Federal Republic of Germany.

In 1993, the annual Heinz Billing prize for "outstanding contributions to computational science" was established by the Max Planck Society in his honor, with a prize amount of 5,000 Euro.

== Selected publications ==
- Heinz Billing: Ein Interferenzversuch mit dem Lichte eines Kanalstrahles. J. A. Barth, Leipzig 1938.
- Heinz Billing, Wilhelm Hopmann: Mikroprogramm-Steuerwerk. In: Elektronische Rundschau. Heft 10, 1955.
- Heinz Billing, Albrecht Rüdiger: Das Parametron verspricht neue Möglichkeiten im Rechenmaschinenbau. In: eR – Elektronische Rechenanlagen. Band 1, Heft 3, 1959.
- Heinz Billing: Lernende Automaten. Oldenbourg Verlag, München 1961.
- Heinz Billing: Die im MPI für Physik und Astrophysik entwickelte Rechenanlage G3. In: eR – Elektronische Rechenanlagen. Band 5, Heft 2, 1961.
- Heinz Billing: Magnetische Stufenschichten als Speicherelemente. In: eR – Elektronische Rechenanlagen. Band 5, Heft 6, 1963.
- Heinz Billing: Schnelle Rechenmaschinenspeicher und ihre Geschwindigkeits- und Kapazitätsgrenzen. In: eR – Elektronische Rechenanlagen. Band 5, Heft 2, 1963.
- Heinz Billing, Albrecht Rüdiger, Roland Schilling: BRUSH – Ein Spezialrechner zur Spurerkennung und Spurverfolgung in Blasenkammerbildern. In: eR – Elektronische Rechenanlagen. Band 11, Heft 3, 1969.
- Heinz Billing: Zur Entwicklungsgeschichte der digitalen Speicher. In: eR – Elektronische Rechenanlagen. Band 19, Heft 5, 1977.
- Heinz Billing: A wide-band laser interferometer for the detection of gravitational radiation. progress report, Max-Planck-Institut für Physik und Astrophysik, München 1979.
- Heinz Billing: Die Göttinger Rechenmaschinen G1, G2, G3. In: Entwicklungstendenzen wissenschaftlicher Rechenzentren, Kolloquium, Göttingen. Springer, Berlin 1980, ISBN 3-540-10491-7.
- Heinz Billing: The Munich gravitational wave detector using laser interferometry. Max-Planck-Institut für Physik und Astrophysik, München 1982.
- Heinz Billing: Die Göttinger Rechenmaschinen G1, G2 und G3. In: MPG-Spiegel. 4, 1982.
- Heinz Billing: Meine Lebenserinnerungen. Selbstverlag, 1994.
- Heinz Billing: Ein Leben zwischen Forschung und Praxis. Selbstverlag F. Genscher, Düsseldorf 1997.
- Heinz Billing: Fast memories for computers and their limitations regarding speed and capacity (Schnelle Rechenmaschinen- speicher und ihre Geschwindigkeits- und Kapazitätsgrenzen). In: IT – Information Technology. Band 50, Heft 5, 2008.
