= Laura Cadonati =

American gravitational waves physicist

Prof Laura Cadonati
- Education: Princeton University
- Scientific career
- Fields: Gravitational waves Astroparticle physics
- Workplaces: Georgia Institute of Technology
- Thesis: The Borexino Solar Neutrino Experiment and its Scintillator Containment Vessel (2001)
- Doctoral advisor: Frank Calaprice
- Website: cadonati.gatech.edu

Laura Cadonati is an American physicist who specializes in gravitational waves.

== Career ==
Cadonati completed her PhD at Princeton University in 2001 with her thesis The Borexino Solar Neutrino Experiment and its Scintillator Containment Vessel. She was an associate professor in the physics department at University of Massachusetts Amherst before moving to the Center for Relativistic Astrophysics at Georgia Institute of Technology in 2015.

Cadonati has been a member of the Laser Interferometer Gravitational-Wave Observatory (LIGO) collaboration since 2002, and was involved in the first observations of gravitational waves in 2015.

In 2017 she became the first deputy spokesperson for LIGO and was widely quoted in the media as LIGO detected its third gravitational wave.

Cadonati became associate dean for research in the College of Sciences at Georgia Institute of Technology in 2021.

She is a member of the International Astronomical Union.

== Awards and honors ==
- 2010: National Science Foundation CAREER award
- 2015: Fellow of the American Physical Society for "leadership of the gravitational-wave data analysis and astrophysics efforts of the LIGO Scientific Collaboration, including work connecting numerical modeling of sources to observations with the LIGO, Virgo, and GEO detectors"
- 2018: Outstanding Faculty Research Author Award
