= GW170104 =

Gravitational-wave event

- The signal of GW170104 measured by Hanford and Livingston.
- Date: 4 January 2017
- Redshift: 0.18 ±0.08
- Total energy output: ≈ 2 M_{☉} × c^{2}
- Other designations: GW170104
- Related media on Commons

GW170104 was a gravitational wave signal detected by the LIGO observatory on 4 January 2017. On 1 June 2017, the LIGO and Virgo collaborations announced that they had reliably verified the signal, making it the third such signal announced, after GW150914 and GW151226, and fourth overall.

== Event detection ==
The signal was detected by LIGO at 10:11:58.6 UTC, with the Hanford detector picking it up 3 milliseconds before the Livingston detector. Automated analyses did not initially identify this event as information about the state of the Hanford detector was not being correctly recorded. The event was found by a researcher at the Max Planck Institute for Gravitational Physics by visual inspection of triggers from the Livingston detector. The gravitational wave frequency at peak GW strain was 160 to 199 Hz.

== Astrophysical origin ==
Analysis indicated the signal resulted from the inspiral and merger of a pair of black holes (BBH) with 31.2+8.4
−6.0 and 19.4+5.3
−5.9 times the mass of the Sun, at a distance of 880+450
−390 megaparsecs (2.9+1.5
−1.3 billion light years) from Earth. The resulting black hole had a mass of 48.7+5.7
−4.6 solar masses, two solar masses having been radiated away as gravitational energy. The peak luminosity of GW170104 was 3.1+0.7
−1.3×10^{49} W.

== Implication for binary black hole formation ==
The spin axes of the black holes were likely misaligned with the axis of the binary orbit. The probability that both spin axes were positively aligned with the orbit is less than 5%. This configuration suggests that the binary black hole system was formed dynamically in a dense star cluster such as a globular cluster, i.e., as a result of gravitational interaction between stars and binary stars, in which case randomly aligned spin axes are expected. The competing scenario, that the system was formed out of a binary star system consisting of two normal (main sequence) stars, is not ruled out but is disfavored as black holes formed in such a binary are more likely to have positively aligned spins.

== Graviton mass upper limit ==
The analysis of GW170104 yielded a new upper bound on the mass of gravitons, if gravitons are massive at all. The graviton's Compton wavelength is at least 1.6×10^{16} m, or about 1.6 light-years, corresponding to a graviton mass of no more than 7.7×10^{−23} eV/c^{2}. This Compton wavelength is about 9×10^{9} times greater than the gravitational wavelength of the GW170104 event.

== See also ==
- Gravitational-wave astronomy
- List of gravitational wave observations
