= Craig Hogan =

American astronomer

Craig Hogan is an American professor of astronomy and physics at the University of Chicago and director of the Fermilab Center for Particle Astrophysics.

He is known for his theory of "holographic noise", which holds that the holographic principle may imply quantum fluctuations in spatial positions that would lead to apparent background noise, or holographic noise, measurable by gravitational-wave detectors, in particular GEO 600.

Hogan attended Palos Verdes High School. In 1976, he earned a B.A. in astronomy from Harvard University and a Ph.D. in astronomy from King's College at the University of Cambridge, England, in 1980.

He was an Enrico Fermi Fellow at the University of Chicago from 1980 to 1981, a National Science Foundation Postdoctoral Fellow at Cambridge between 1981 and 1982, and a Bantrell Prize Fellow in Theoretical Astrophysics at the California Institute of Technology from 1982 to 1985.

In 1998, he was a member of the international High-z Supernova Search Team, which co-discovered dark energy.

Hogan is the author of The Little Book of the Big Bang, published in 1998 by Springer-Verlag.
