= GW151226 =

Second gravitational-wave event detected by LIGO

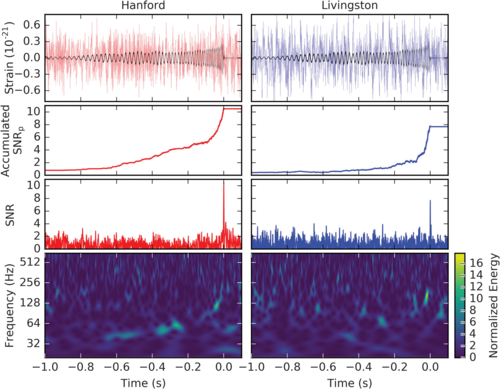
- GW151226 observed by the LIGO Hanford (left column) and Livingston (right column) detectors
- Total energy output: ~ 1 M_{☉} × c^{2}
- Other designations: GW151226
- Related media on Commons

GW151226 was a gravitational wave signal detected by the LIGO observatory on 25 December 2015 local time (26 Dec 2015 UTC). On 15 June 2016, the LIGO and Virgo collaborations announced that they had verified the signal, making it the second such signal confirmed, after GW150914, which had been announced four months earlier the same year, and the third gravitational wave signal detected.

== Event detection ==
The signal was detected by LIGO at 03:38:53 UTC, with the Hanford detector picking it up 1.1 milliseconds after the Livingston detector (since the axis between the two was not parallel to the wave front); it was identified by a low-latency search within 70s of its arrival at the detectors.

== Astrophysical origin ==
Analysis indicated the signal resulted from the coalescence of two black holes with 14.2+8.3
−3.7 and 7.5+2.3
−2.3 times the mass of the Sun, at a distance of 440+180
−190 megaparsecs (1.4 billion light years) from Earth. The resulting merged black hole had 20.8+6.1
−1.7 solar masses, one solar mass having been radiated away. In both of the first two black hole mergers analyzed, the mass converted to gravitational waves was roughly 4.6% of the initial total.

In this second detection, LIGO Scientific Collaboration and Virgo scientists also determined that at least one of the premerger black holes was spinning at more than 20% of the maximum spin rate allowed by general relativity. The final black hole was spinning with 0.74+0.06
−0.06 times its maximum possible angular momentum. The black holes were smaller than in the first detection event, which led to different timing for the final orbits and allowed LIGO to see more of the last stages before the black holes merged—55 cycles (27 orbits) over one second, with frequency increasing from 35 to 450 Hz, compared with only ten cycles over 0.2 second in the first event.

The location/direction in the sky is poorly constrained. The signal was first seen at Livingston with delay of 1.1 (±0.3) ms later at LIGO Hanford.

== Implications ==
The GW151226 event suggests that there is a large population of binary black holes in the Universe that will produce frequent mergers.

The measured gravitational wave is completely consistent with the predictions of general relativity for strong gravitational fields. The theory's strong-field predictions had not been directly tested before the two LIGO events. General relativity passed this most stringent test for the second time.

== See also ==
- Gravitational-wave astronomy
