= LIGO =

Gravitational wave observatory site

Laser Interferometer Gravitational Wave Observatory
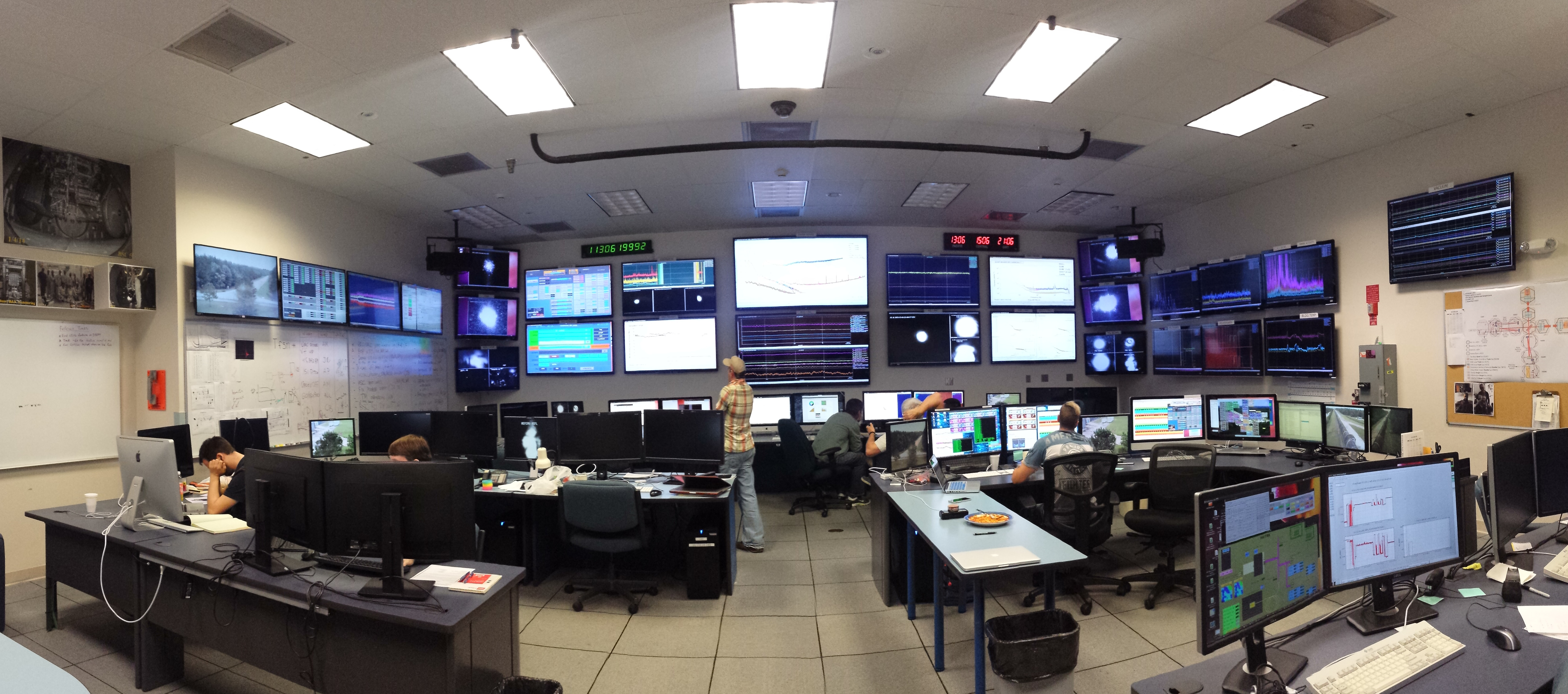
- The LIGO Livingston control room as it was during Advanced LIGO's first observing run (O1)
- Alternative names: LIGO
- Location: Hanford Site, Washington, and Livingston, Louisiana, US
- Coordinates: LIGO Hanford Observatory: 46°27′19″N 119°24′28″W; LIGO Livingston Observatory: 30°33′47″N 90°46′28″W
- Wavelength: 43 km (7.0 kHz)–10,000 km (30 Hz)
- Length: 4,000 m (13,123 ft 4 in)
- Website: www.ligo.caltech.edu
- LIGO observatories in the Contiguous United States
- Related media on Commons

The Laser Interferometer Gravitational-Wave Observatory (LIGO) is a large-scale physics experiment and observatory designed to detect cosmic gravitational waves. Prior to LIGO, all data about the universe had come in the form of light and other forms of electromagnetic radiation, from limited direct exploration on relatively nearby Solar System objects such as the Moon, Mars, Venus, Jupiter and their moons, asteroids etc., and from high energy cosmic particles. Initially, two large observatories were built in the United States with the aim of detecting gravitational waves by laser interferometry. Two additional, smaller gravitational wave observatories are now operational: one in Japan (KAGRA), and one in Italy (Virgo). The two LIGO observatories use mirrors spaced 4 kilometres (13,000 ft) apart to measure changes in length—over an effective span of 1,120 kilometres (700 mi)—of less than one ten-thousandth the charge diameter of a proton.

The initial LIGO observatories were funded by the United States National Science Foundation (NSF). They were conceived, built, and are operated by Caltech and MIT in the 1990s. They started to collect data from 2002 to 2010, but no gravitational waves were detected during that period.

The Advanced LIGO Project to enhance the original LIGO detectors began in 2008, and continues to be supported by the NSF, with important contributions from the United Kingdom's Science and Technology Facilities Council, the Max Planck Society of Germany, and the Australian Research Council. The improved detectors began operation in 2015. The detection of gravitational waves was reported in 2016 by the LIGO Scientific Collaboration (LSC) and the Virgo Collaboration with the international participation of scientists from several universities and research institutions. Scientists involved in the project and the analysis of the data for gravitational-wave astronomy are organized by the LSC, which includes more than 1,000 scientists worldwide, as well as 440,000 active Einstein@Home users as of December 2016.

LIGO is the largest and most ambitious project ever funded by the NSF. In 2017, the Nobel Prize in Physics was awarded to Rainer Weiss, Kip Thorne and Barry Barish "for decisive contributions to the LIGO detector and the observation of gravitational waves".

Observations are made in "runs". As of February 2026, LIGO has made four runs (with the third run divided into two "subruns" and the fourth divided into three subruns), and made 391 detections of gravitational waves. Maintenance and upgrades of the detectors are made between runs. The first run, O1, which ran from September 12, 2015, to January 19, 2016, made the first three detections, all black hole mergers. The second run, O2, which ran from November 30, 2016, to August 25, 2017, made eight detections: seven black hole mergers and the first neutron star merger. The third run, O3, began on April 1, 2019; it was divided into O3a, from April 1 to September 30, 2019, and O3b, from November 1, 2019 until it was suspended on March 27, 2020, due to COVID-19. The O3 run included the first detection of the merger of a neutron star with a black hole. The fourth run, O4, began on May 24, 2023, and ended on November 18, 2025. A total of 250 detection "candidates" were observed during O4, with 77 confirmed observations and the remaining 173 pending final analysis as of February 2026.

Subsequent gravitational wave observatories Virgo in Italy and KAGRA in Japan, which both use interferometer arms 3 kilometres (9,800 ft) long, coordinated with LIGO to continue observations after the COVID-caused stop, with LIGO's O4 observing run operating from May 24, 2023 to November 18, 2025. During this time, LIGO had a sensitivity of 160–190 Mpc for binary neutron star mergers (sensitivities: Virgo 80–115 Mpc, KAGRA greater than 1 Mpc).

== History ==
=== Background ===
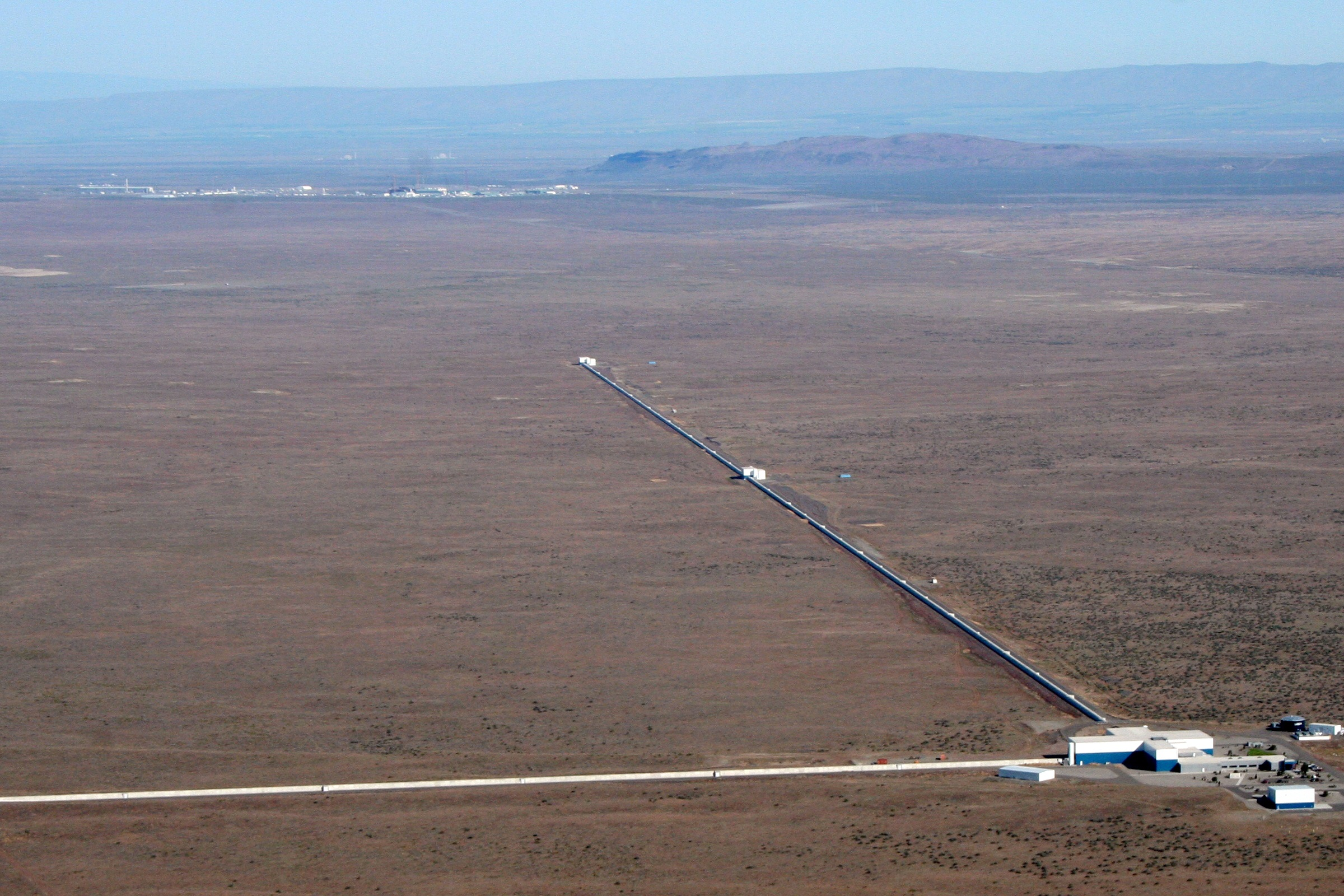
LIGO Hanford Observatory

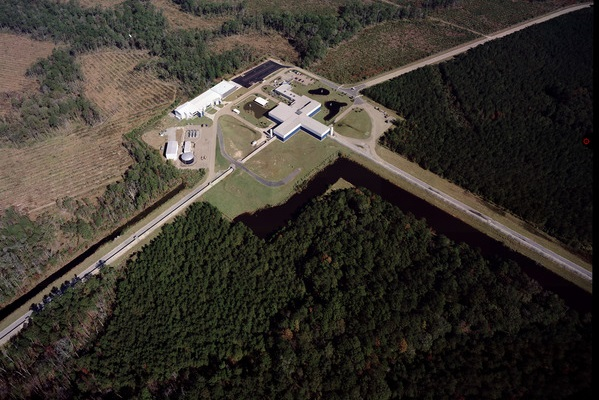
LIGO Louisiana Observatory

The LIGO concept built upon early work by many scientists to test a component of Albert Einstein's theory of general relativity, the existence of gravitational waves. Starting in the 1960s, American scientists including Joseph Weber, as well as Soviet scientists Mikhail Gertsenshtein and Vladislav Pustovoit, conceived of basic ideas and prototypes of laser interferometry, and in 1967 Rainer Weiss of MIT published an analysis of interferometer use and initiated the construction of a prototype with military funding, but it was terminated before it could become operational. Starting in 1968, Kip Thorne initiated theoretical efforts on gravitational waves and their sources at Caltech, and was convinced that gravitational wave detection would eventually succeed.

Prototype interferometric gravitational wave detectors (interferometers) were built in the late 1960s by Robert L. Forward and colleagues at Hughes Research Laboratories (with mirrors mounted on a vibration isolated plate rather than free swinging), and in the 1970s (with free swinging mirrors between which light bounced many times) by Weiss at MIT, and then by Heinz Billing and colleagues in Garching Germany, and then by Ronald Drever, James Hough and colleagues in Glasgow, Scotland.

In 1980, the NSF funded the study of a large interferometer led by MIT (Paul Linsay, Peter Saulson, Rainer Weiss), and the following year, Caltech constructed a 40-meter prototype (Ronald Drever and Stan Whitcomb). The MIT study established the feasibility of interferometers at a 1 km scale with adequate sensitivity.

Under pressure from the NSF, MIT and Caltech were asked to join forces to lead a LIGO project based on the MIT study and on experimental work at Caltech, MIT, Glasgow, and Garching. Drever, Thorne, and Weiss formed a LIGO steering committee, though they were turned down for funding in 1984 and 1985. By 1986, they were asked to disband the steering committee and a single director, Rochus E. Vogt (Caltech), was appointed. In 1988, a research and development proposal achieved funding.

From 1989 through 1994, LIGO failed to progress technically and organizationally. Only political efforts continued to acquire funding. Ongoing funding was routinely rejected until 1991, when the U.S. Congress agreed to fund LIGO for the first year for $23 million. However, requirements for receiving the funding were not met or approved, and the NSF questioned the technological and organizational basis of the project. By 1992, LIGO was restructured with Drever no longer a direct participant. Ongoing project management issues and technical concerns were revealed in NSF reviews of the project, resulting in the withholding of funds until they formally froze spending in 1993.

In 1994, after consultation between relevant NSF personnel, LIGO's scientific leaders, and the presidents of MIT and Caltech, Vogt stepped down and Barry Barish (Caltech) was appointed laboratory director, and the NSF made clear that LIGO had one last chance for support. Barish's team created a new study, budget, and project plan with a budget exceeding the previous proposals by 40%. Barish proposed to the NSF and National Science Board to build LIGO as an evolutionary detector, where detection of gravitational waves with initial LIGO would be possible, and with advanced LIGO would be probable. This new proposal received NSF funding, Barish was appointed principal investigator, and the increase was approved. In 1994, with a budget of US$395 million, LIGO stood as the largest overall funded NSF project in history. The project broke ground in Hanford, Washington in late 1994 and in Livingston, Louisiana in 1995. As construction neared completion in 1997, under Barish's leadership two organizational institutions were formed, LIGO Laboratory and LIGO Scientific Collaboration (LSC). The LIGO laboratory consists of the facilities supported by the NSF under LIGO Operation and Advanced R&D; this includes administration of the LIGO detector and test facilities. The LIGO Scientific Collaboration is a forum for organizing technical and scientific research in LIGO. It is a separate organization from LIGO Laboratory with its own oversight. Barish appointed Weiss as the first spokesperson for this scientific collaboration.

=== Observations begin ===
Initial LIGO operations between 2002 and 2010 did not detect any gravitational waves. In 2004, under Barish, the funding and groundwork were laid for the next phase of LIGO development (called "Enhanced LIGO"). This was followed by a multi-year shut-down while the detectors were replaced by much improved "Advanced LIGO" versions. Much of the research and development work for the LIGO/aLIGO machines was based on pioneering work for the GEO600 detector at Hannover, Germany. By February 2015, the detectors were brought into engineering mode in both locations.

In mid-September 2015, "the world's largest gravitational-wave facility" completed a five-year US$200-million overhaul, bringing the total cost to $620 million. On September 18, 2015, Advanced LIGO began its first formal science observations at about four times the sensitivity of the initial LIGO interferometers. Its sensitivity was to be further enhanced until it was planned to reach design sensitivity around 2021.

==== Detections ====
On February 11, 2016, the LIGO Scientific Collaboration and Virgo Collaboration published a paper about the detection of gravitational waves, from a signal detected at 09.51 GMT on September 14, 2015, of two ~30 solar mass black holes merging about 1.3 billion light-years from Earth.

Executive director David Reitze announced the findings at a media event in Washington D.C., while executive director emeritus Barry Barish presented the first scientific paper of the findings at CERN to the physics community.

On May 2, 2016, members of the LIGO Scientific Collaboration and other contributors were awarded a Special Breakthrough Prize in Fundamental Physics for contributing to the direct detection of gravitational waves.

On June 16, 2016, LIGO announced a second signal was detected from the merging of two black holes with 14.2 and 7.5 times the mass of the Sun. The signal was picked up on December 26, 2015, at 3:38 UTC.

The detection of a third black hole merger, between objects of 31.2 and 19.4 solar masses, occurred on January 4, 2017, and was announced on June 1, 2017. Laura Cadonati was appointed the first deputy spokesperson.

A fourth detection of a black hole merger, between objects of 30.5 and 25.3 solar masses, was observed on August 14, 2017, and was announced on September 27, 2017.

In 2017, Weiss, Barish, and Thorne received the Nobel Prize in Physics "for decisive contributions to the LIGO detector and the observation of gravitational waves". Weiss was awarded one-half of the total prize money, and Barish and Thorne each received a one-quarter prize.

After shutting down for improvements, LIGO resumed operation on March 26, 2019, with Virgo joining the network of gravitational-wave detectors on April 1, 2019. Both ran until March 27, 2020, when the COVID-19 pandemic halted operations. During the COVID shutdown, LIGO underwent a further upgrade in sensitivity, and observing run O4 with the new sensitivity ran from May 24, 2023 to November 18, 2025.

== Mission ==
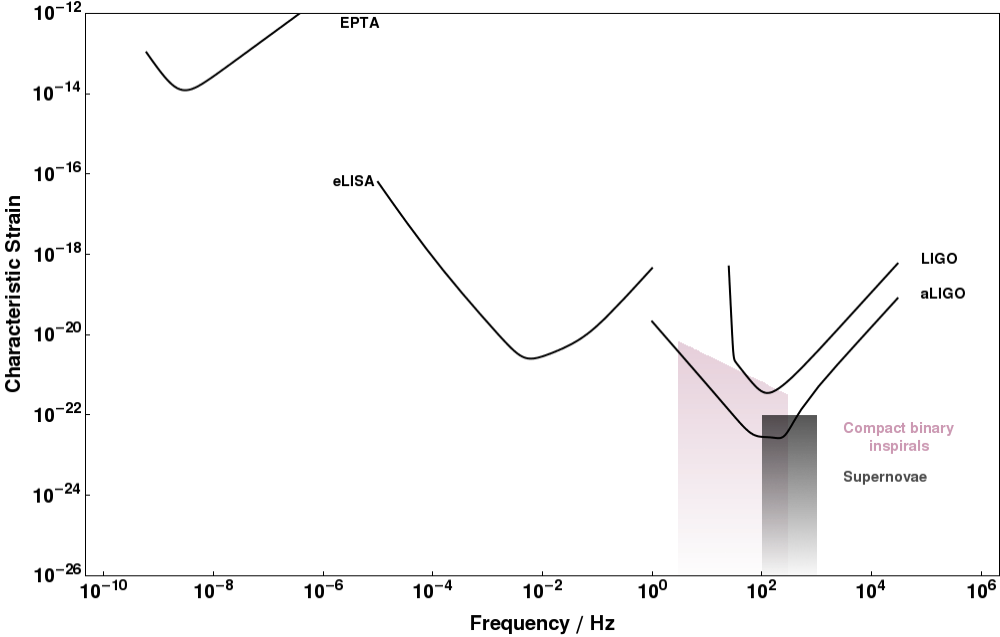
Detector noise curves for Initial and Advanced LIGO as a function of frequency. They lie above the bands for space-borne detectors like the evolved Laser Interferometer Space Antenna (eLISA) and pulsar timing arrays such as the European Pulsar Timing Array (EPTA). The characteristic strains of potential astrophysical sources are also shown. To be detectable the characteristic strain of a signal must be above the noise curve. These frequencies that aLIGO can detect are in the range of human hearing.

LIGO's mission is to directly observe gravitational waves of cosmic origin. These waves were first predicted by Einstein's general theory of relativity in 1916, when the technology necessary for their detection did not yet exist. Their existence was indirectly confirmed in 1974, when observations of the binary pulsar PSR 1913+16 showed an orbital decay which matched Einstein's predictions of energy loss by gravitational radiation. The Nobel Prize in Physics 1993 was awarded to Hulse and Taylor for this discovery.

Direct detection of gravitational waves had long been sought. Their discovery has launched a new branch of astronomy to complement electromagnetic telescopes and neutrino observatories. Joseph Weber pioneered the effort to detect gravitational waves in the 1960s through his work on resonant mass bar detectors. Bar detectors continue to be used at six sites worldwide. By the 1970s, scientists including Rainer Weiss realized the applicability of laser interferometry to gravitational wave measurements. Robert Forward operated an interferometric detector at Hughes in the early 1970s.

In fact as early as the 1960s, and perhaps before that, there were papers published on wave resonance of light and gravitational waves. Work was published in 1971 on methods to exploit this resonance for the detection of high-frequency gravitational waves. In 1962, M. E. Gertsenshtein and V. I. Pustovoit published the very first paper describing the principles for using interferometers for the detection of very long wavelength gravitational waves. The authors argued that by using interferometers the sensitivity can be 10^{7} to 10^{10} times better than by using electromechanical experiments. Later, in 1965, Braginsky extensively discussed gravitational-wave sources and their possible detection. He pointed out the 1962 paper and mentioned the possibility of detecting gravitational waves if the interferometric technology and measuring techniques improved.

Since the early 1990s, physicists have thought that technology has evolved to the point where detection of gravitational waves—of significant astrophysical interest—is now possible.

In August 2002, LIGO began its search for cosmic gravitational waves. Measurable emissions of gravitational waves are expected from binary systems (collisions and coalescences of neutron stars or black holes), supernova explosions of massive stars (which form neutron stars and black holes), accreting neutron stars, rotations of neutron stars with deformed crusts, and the remnants of gravitational radiation created by the birth of the universe. The observatory may, in theory, also observe more exotic hypothetical phenomena, such as gravitational waves caused by oscillating cosmic strings or colliding domain walls.

== Observatories ==
LIGO operates two gravitational wave observatories in unison: the LIGO Livingston Observatory (30°33′47″N 90°46′28″W) in Livingston, Louisiana, and the LIGO Hanford Observatory, on the DOE Hanford Site (46°27′19″N 119°24′28″W), located near Richland, Washington. These sites are separated by 3002 km straight line distance through the earth, but 3030 km over the surface. Since gravitational waves are expected to travel at the speed of light, this distance corresponds to a difference in gravitational wave arrival times of up to ten milliseconds. With the difference in arrival times at three different facilities one can trilaterate the source of the wave. This is done by adding a third instrument like Virgo, located at an even greater distance, in Europe.

Each observatory supports an L-shaped ultra high vacuum system, measuring 4 km on each side. Up to five interferometers can be set up in each vacuum system.

The LIGO Livingston Observatory houses one laser interferometer in the primary configuration. This interferometer was successfully upgraded in 2004 with an active vibration isolation system based on hydraulic actuators providing a factor of 10 isolation in the 0.1–5 Hz band. Seismic vibration in this band is chiefly due to microseismic waves and anthropogenic sources (traffic, logging, etc.).

The LIGO Hanford Observatory houses one interferometer, almost identical to the one at the Livingston Observatory. During the Initial and Enhanced LIGO phases, a half-length interferometer operated in parallel with the main interferometer. For this 2 km interferometer, the Fabry–Pérot arm cavities had the same optical finesse, and, thus, half the storage time as the 4 km interferometers. With half the storage time, the theoretical strain sensitivity was as good as the full length interferometers above 200 Hz but only half as good at low frequencies. During the same era, Hanford retained its original passive seismic isolation system due to limited geologic activity in Southeastern Washington.

== Operation ==
Simplified operation of a gravitational wave observatory Figure 1: A beamsplitter (green line) splits coherent light (from the white box) into two beams which reflect off the mirrors (cyan oblongs); only one outgoing and reflected beam in each arm is shown, and separated for clarity. The reflected beams recombine and an interference pattern is detected (purple circle). Figure 2: A gravitational wave passing over the left arm (yellow) changes its length and thus the interference pattern.

The parameters in this section refer to the Advanced LIGO experiment. The primary interferometer consists of two beam lines of 4 km length which form a power-recycled Michelson interferometer with Gires–Tournois etalon arms. A pre-stabilized 1064 nm Nd:YAG laser emits a beam with a power of 20 W that passes through a power recycling mirror. The mirror fully transmits light incident from the laser and reflects light from the other side increasing the power of the light field between the mirror and the subsequent beam splitter to 700 W. From the beam splitter the light travels along two orthogonal arms. By the use of partially reflecting mirrors, Fabry–Pérot cavities are created in both arms that increase the effective path length of laser light in the arm from 4 km to approximately 1200 km. The power of the light field in the cavity is 100 kW.

When a gravitational wave passes through the interferometer, the spacetime in the local area is altered. Depending on the source of the wave and its polarization, this results in an effective change in length of one or both of the cavities. The effective length change between the beams will cause the light currently in the cavity to become very slightly out of phase (antiphase) with the incoming light. The cavity will therefore periodically get very slightly out of coherence and the beams, which are tuned to destructively interfere at the detector, will have a very slight periodically varying detuning. This results in a measurable signal.

After an equivalent of approximately 280 trips down the 4 km length to the far mirrors and back again, the two separate beams leave the arms and recombine at the beam splitter. The beams returning from two arms are kept out of phase so that when the arms are both in coherence and interference (as when there is no gravitational wave passing through), their light waves subtract, and no light should arrive at the photodiode. When a gravitational wave passes through the interferometer, the distances along the arms of the interferometer are shortened and lengthened, causing the beams to become slightly less out of phase. This results in the beams coming in phase, creating a resonance, hence some light arrives at the photodiode and indicates a signal. Light that does not contain a signal is returned to the interferometer using a power recycling mirror, thus increasing the power of the light in the arms.

=== Noise ===
Since the signal being measured is so small, the LIGO project has carefully measured, documented, and eliminated many forms of noise. Mechanical/seismic noise sources can move objects in the optical system, such as the mirrors, the photon injectors, etc. Electric and magnetic noise can vibrate the permanent magnets and electronics, and radio waves can couple to electronics in the interferometer controls. These noises may drown out the real signal, or produce spurious signals. Background noise and unknown errors (which happen daily) are in the order of 10^{−20}, while gravitational wave signals are around 10^{−22}. After noise reduction, a signal-to-noise ratio around 20 can be achieved, or higher when combined with other gravitational wave detectors around the world.

Much complexity in the instrument is in reducing these spurious couplings, and in monitoring the environment to detect previously unknown sources of noise in order to mitigate them or estimate their impact on the gravitational wave data. Other than careful insulation of the equipment, the methods of mitigation also include:

- If the noise source is produced by nearby human activity, then the human activity can be adjusted or relocated. For example, the main road near the LHO site was repaved to reduce vibrations caused by trucks.
- If the noise source is predictable, then the equipment can adjust directly to cancel out the noise source. This is true for Earth tides.
- If the noise source is not predictable, but measurable, and its effect on the equipment is known, then the noise can be recorded and subtracted from the signal afterwards. This is true for seismic activities.

Seismic vibration is a major source of noise, mitigated by seismic insulation, as well as by sensitive recording of seismic activity in the vicinity of the site, which allows the effect of seismic activity to be subtracted away from the signal. Earth tides produce significant but highly predictable stretching of the equipment, which is cancelled out by a system which adjusts the position of the chambers or the laser frequency, based on the predicted stretching. There are also many "microseismic" sources that produce ground vibrations, including ocean storms, dam operations, forest logging, trucks driving on a road 2 km away, walking heavily in a control room, etc. When under a strong wind, the walls of the building can tilt, which deforms the floor within 10 m of the walls, creating "tilt noise". Even the thermal expansion and contraction of the building itself creates creaks and thumps. Similarly, acoustic vibrations can shake the equipment. This includes wind, nearby vehicles, propeller aircraft, HVAC of a building 300 m away, cooling fans, etc. Other sources of noise include a case of ravens pecking on frost-covered pipes connected to a LN2 cryopump on hot days. Some noises are transient with no identifiable cause.

Electromagnetic noise can couple with electronic and magnetic equipment. Such examples include building heaters, large motors, lights or relatively near-by high-voltage power lines up to 4 km away from the site. Since Barkhausen noise is suspected to be relevant, magnets at noise-critical locations of aLIGO are made of samarium cobalt, which has lower Barkhausen noise.

Because gravity cannot be shielded, the motion of massive objects can create varying gravitational attraction on the test masses in LIGO, called gravity gradient noise or Newtonian noise. This can be caused by air and soil density variation. Even the gravitational effect of a single human walking within 5 m of the mirror already approaches the noise floor, and the LIGO corner building was designed to keep people at least 10 m from all test masses during normal operations. Cosmic ray events may also create noise in the detector.

== Observations ==
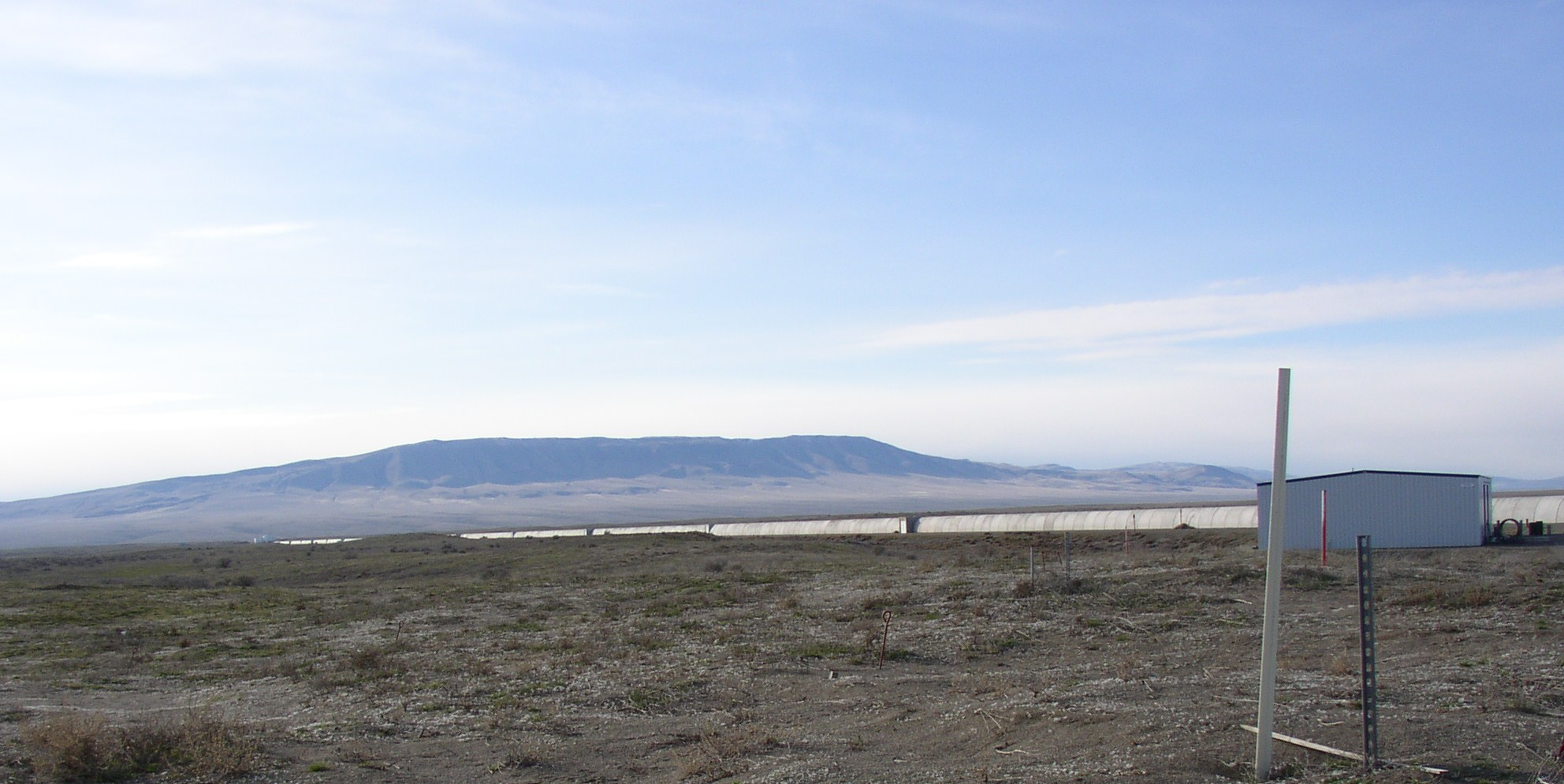
Western leg of LIGO interferometer on Hanford Reservation

Based on current models of astronomical events, and the predictions of the general theory of relativity, gravitational waves that originate tens of millions of light years from Earth are expected to distort the 4 km mirror spacing by about 10^{−18} m, less than one-thousandth the charge diameter of a proton. Equivalently, this is a relative change in distance of approximately 10^{−21}. A typical event which might cause a detection event would be the late stage inspiral and merger of two 10-solar-mass black holes, not necessarily located in the Milky Way galaxy, which is expected to result in a very specific sequence of signals often summarized by the slogan chirp, burst, quasi-normal mode ringing, exponential decay.

In their fourth Science Run at the end of 2004, the LIGO detectors demonstrated sensitivities in measuring these displacements to within a factor of two of their design.

During LIGO's fifth Science Run in November 2005, sensitivity reached the primary design specification of a detectable strain of 10^{−21} over a 100 Hz bandwidth. The baseline inspiral of two roughly solar-mass neutron stars is typically expected to be observable if it occurs within about 8 million parsecs (26×10^{6} ly), or the vicinity of the Local Group, averaged over all directions and polarizations. Also at this time, LIGO and GEO 600 (the German-UK interferometric detector) began a joint science run, during which they collected data for several months. Virgo (the French-Italian interferometric detector) joined in May 2007. The fifth science run ended in 2007, after extensive analysis of data from this run did not uncover any unambiguous detection events.

In February 2007, GRB 070201, a short gamma-ray burst arrived at Earth from the direction of the Andromeda Galaxy. The prevailing explanation of most short gamma-ray bursts is the merger of a neutron star with either a neutron star or a black hole. LIGO reported a non-detection for GRB 070201, ruling out a merger at the distance of Andromeda with high confidence. Such a constraint was predicated on LIGO eventually demonstrating a direct detection of gravitational waves.

=== Enhanced LIGO ===
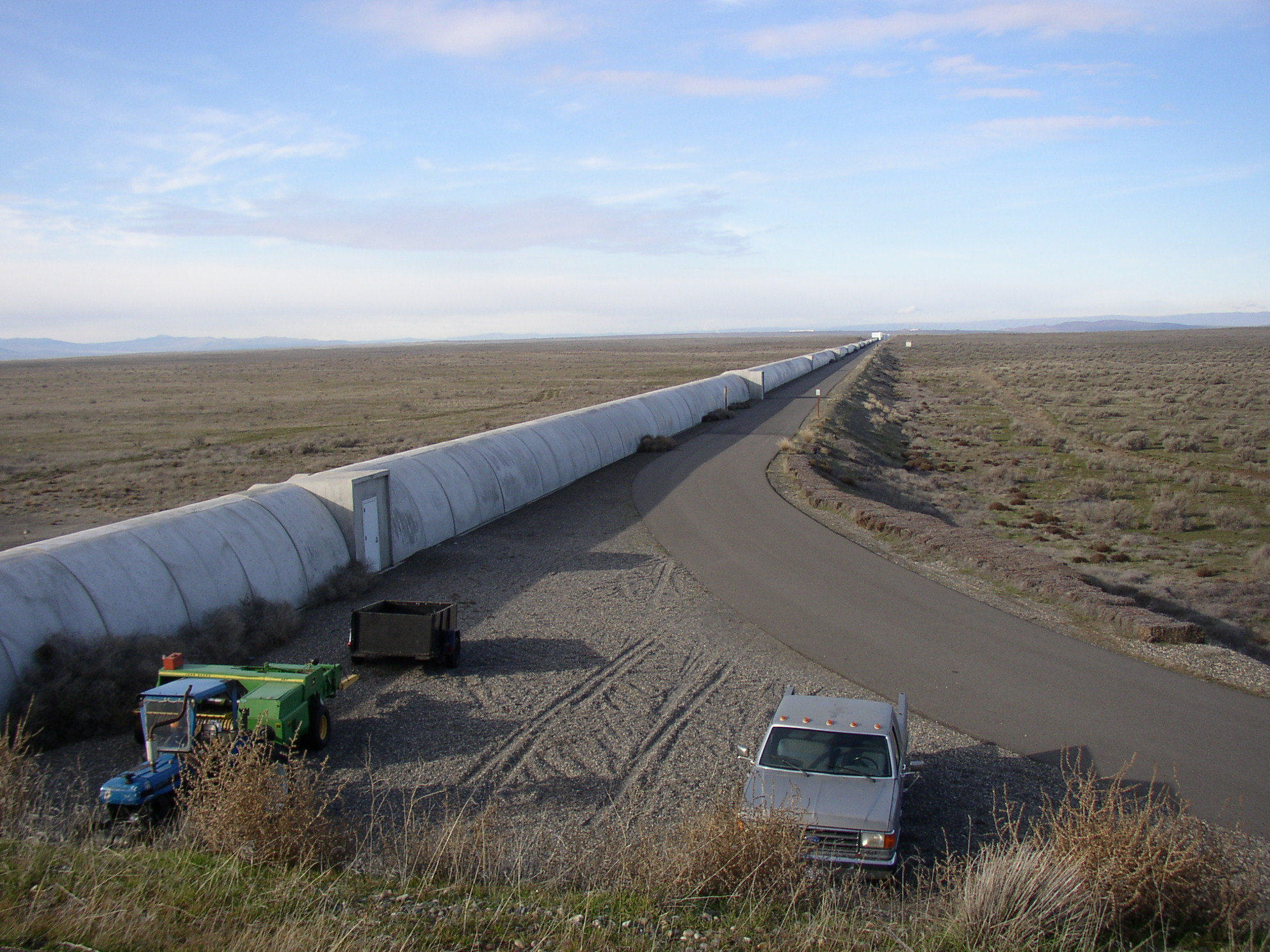
Northern leg (x-arm) of LIGO interferometer on Hanford Reservation

After the completion of Science Run 5, initial LIGO was upgraded with certain technologies, planned for Advanced LIGO but available and able to be retrofitted to initial LIGO, which resulted in an improved-performance configuration dubbed Enhanced LIGO. Some of the improvements in Enhanced LIGO included:

- Increased laser power
- Homodyne detection
- Output mode cleaner
- In-vacuum readout hardware

Science Run 6 (S6) began in July 2009 with the enhanced configurations on the 4 km detectors. It concluded in October 2010, and the disassembly of the original detectors began.

=== Advanced LIGO ===
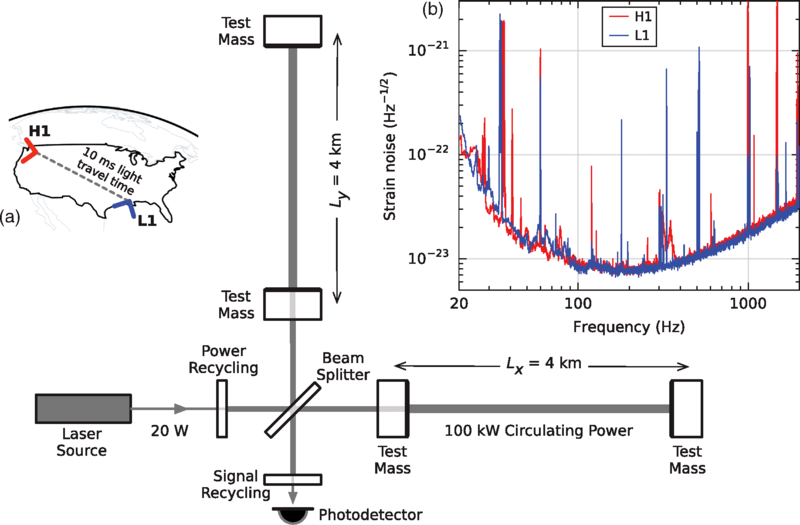
Simplified diagram of an Advanced LIGO detector (not to scale).

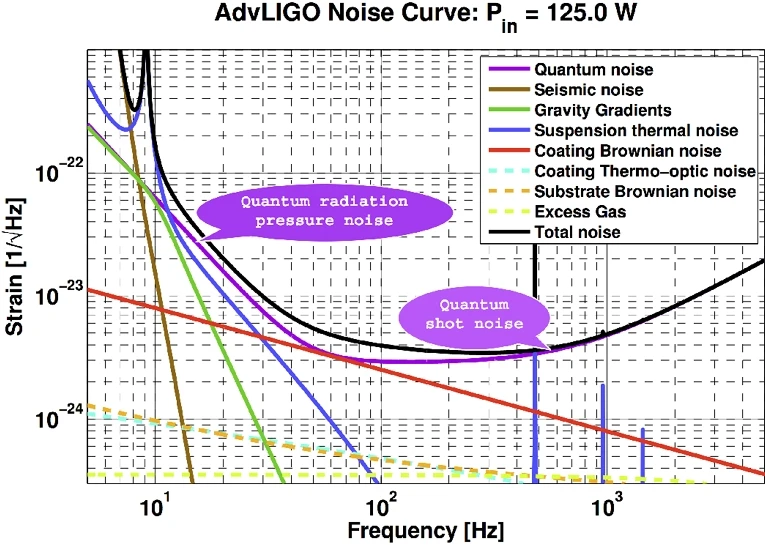
Design sensitivity of Advanced LIGO interferometer with major noise sources, maximum sensitivity is around 500 Hz

After 2010, LIGO went offline for several years for a major upgrade, installing the new Advanced LIGO detectors in the LIGO Observatory infrastructures.

The project continued to attract new members, with the Australian National University and University of Adelaide contributing to Advanced LIGO, and by the time the LIGO Laboratory started the first observing run 'O1' with the Advanced LIGO detectors in September 2015, the LIGO Scientific Collaboration included more than 900 scientists worldwide.

The first observing run operated at a sensitivity roughly three times greater than Initial LIGO, and a much greater sensitivity, up to 80 Mpc for black hole-black hole mergers, for larger systems with their peak radiation at lower audio frequencies.

On February 11, 2016, the LIGO and Virgo collaborations announced the first observation of gravitational waves. The signal, named GW150914, was recorded on September 14, 2015, just two days after Advanced LIGO started collecting data following the upgrade. It matched the predictions of general relativity for the inward spiral and merger of a pair of black holes and subsequent ringdown of the resulting single black hole. The observations demonstrated the existence of binary stellar-mass black hole systems and the first observation of a binary black hole merger.

On June 15, 2016, LIGO announced the detection of a second gravitational wave event, recorded on December 26, 2015, at 3:38 UTC. Analysis of the observed signal indicated that the event was caused by the merger of two black holes with masses of 14.2 and 7.5 solar masses, at a distance of 1.4 billion light years. The signal was named GW151226.

The second observing run (O2) ran from November 30, 2016 to August 25, 2017, with Livingston achieving 15–25% sensitivity improvement (100 Mpc) over O1, and with Hanford's sensitivity similar to O1. In this period, LIGO saw several further gravitational wave events: GW170104 in January; GW170608 in June; and five others between July and August 2017. Several of these were also detected by the Virgo Collaboration. Unlike the black hole mergers which are only detectable gravitationally, GW170817 came from the collision of two neutron stars and was also detected electromagnetically by gamma ray satellites and optical telescopes.

The third run (O3), with a sensitivity of 111-134 Mpc, began on April 1, 2019 and was planned to last until April 30, 2020; in fact it was suspended in March 2020 due to COVID-19. On January 6, 2020, LIGO announced the detection of what appeared to be gravitational ripples from a collision of two neutron stars, recorded on April 25, 2019, by the LIGO Livingston detector. Unlike GW170817, this event did not result in any light being detected. Furthermore, this is the first published event for a single-observatory detection, given that the LIGO Hanford detector was temporarily offline at the time and the event was too faint to be visible in Virgo's data.

The fourth observing run (O4) was planned to start in December 2022, but was postponed until May 24, 2023, concluding on November 18, 2025. During O4 the interferometers operated at a sensitivity of 155–175 Mpc, within the design sensitivity range of 160–190 Mpc for binary neutron star events.

As of November 2026, plans and timeline for the fifth observing run (O5) are still being refined (tentatively 2029 onwards). An intermediate observing run, designated IR1 (Intermediate Run 1), is currently planned for a mid-January 2027 start and is expected to last 6 months. During this run, both LIGO detectors are expected to be operating, with Virgo and KAGRA joining if they are available.

== Future ==
=== LIGO-India ===
LIGO-India, or INDIGO, is a planned collaborative project between the LIGO Laboratory and the Indian Initiative in Gravitational-wave Observations (IndIGO) to create a gravitational-wave detector in India. The LIGO Laboratory, in collaboration with the US National Science Foundation and Advanced LIGO partners from the U.K., Germany and Australia, has offered to provide all of the designs and hardware for one of the three planned Advanced LIGO detectors to be installed, commissioned, and operated by an Indian team of scientists in a facility to be built in India.

The LIGO-India project is a collaboration between LIGO Laboratory and the LIGO-India consortium: Institute of Plasma Research, Gandhinagar; IUCAA (Inter-University Centre for Astronomy and Astrophysics), Pune and Raja Ramanna Centre for Advanced Technology, Indore.

The expansion of worldwide activities in gravitational-wave detection to produce an effective global network has been a goal of LIGO for many years. In 2010, a developmental roadmap issued by the Gravitational Wave International Committee (GWIC) recommended that an expansion of the global array of interferometric detectors be pursued as a highest priority. Such a network would afford astrophysicists with more robust search capabilities and higher scientific yields. The current agreement between the LIGO Scientific Collaboration and the Virgo collaboration links three detectors of comparable sensitivity and forms the core of this international network. Studies indicate that the localization of sources by a network that includes a detector in India would provide significant improvements. Improvements in localization averages are predicted to be approximately an order of magnitude, with substantially larger improvements in certain regions of the sky.

The NSF was willing to permit this relocation, and its consequent schedule delays, as long as it did not increase the LIGO budget. Thus, all costs required to build a laboratory equivalent to the LIGO sites to house the detector would have to be borne by the host country. The first potential distant location was at AIGO in Western Australia, however the Australian government was unwilling to commit funding by October 1, 2011, deadline.

A location in India was discussed at a Joint Commission meeting between India and the US in June 2012. In parallel, the proposal was evaluated by LIGO's funding agency, the NSF. As the basis of the LIGO-India project entails the transfer of one of LIGO's detectors to India, the plan would affect work and scheduling on the Advanced LIGO upgrades already underway. In August 2012, the U.S. National Science Board approved the LIGO Laboratory's request to modify the scope of Advanced LIGO by not installing the Hanford "H2" interferometer, and to prepare it instead for storage in anticipation of sending it to LIGO-India. In India, the project was presented to the Department of Atomic Energy and the Department of Science and Technology for approval and funding. On February 17, 2016, less than a week after LIGO's landmark announcement about the detection of gravitational waves, Indian Prime Minister Narendra Modi announced that the Cabinet has granted 'in-principle' approval to the LIGO-India mega science proposal.

A site near pilgrimage site of Aundha Nagnath in the Hingoli district of state Maharashtra in western India has been selected.

On April 7, 2023, the LIGO-India project was approved by the Cabinet of Government of India. Construction officially began on 23 April 2026 in Maharashtra's Hingoli district at a cost of INR 2600 crores with an expected completion and commissioning target date for first observations at LIGO-India as 2030.

=== A+ ===
Like Enhanced LIGO, certain improvements will be retrofitted to the existing Advanced LIGO instrument. These are referred to as A+ proposals, and are planned for installation starting from 2019 until the upgraded detector is operational in 2024. The changes would almost double Advanced LIGO's sensitivity, and increase the volume of space searched by a factor of seven. The upgrades include:

- Improvements to the mirror suspension system.
- Increased reflectivity of the mirrors.
- Using frequency-dependent squeezed light, which would simultaneously decrease radiation pressure at low frequencies and shot noise at high frequencies, and
- Improved mirror coatings with lower mechanical loss.

Because the final LIGO output photodetector is sensitive to phase, and not amplitude, it is possible to squeeze the signal so there is less phase noise and more amplitude noise, without violating the quantum mechanical limit on their product. This is done by injecting a "squeezed vacuum state" into the dark port (interferometer output) which is quieter, in the relevant parameter, than simple darkness. Such a squeezing upgrade was installed at both LIGO sites prior to the third observing run. The A+ improvement will see the installation of an additional optical cavity that acts to rotate the squeezing quadrature from phase-squeezed at high frequencies (above 50 Hz) to amplitude-squeezed at low frequencies, thereby also mitigating low-frequency radiation pressure noise.

=== LIGO Voyager ===
A third-generation detector at the existing LIGO sites is being planned under the name "LIGO Voyager" to improve the sensitivity by an additional factor of two, and halve the low-frequency cutoff to 10 Hz. Plans call for the glass mirrors and 1064 nm lasers to be replaced by even larger 160 kg silicon test masses, cooled to 123 K (a temperature achievable with liquid nitrogen), and a change to a longer laser wavelength in the range 1500–2200 nm at which silicon is transparent. (Many documents assume a wavelength of 1550 nm, but this is not final.)

Voyager would be an upgrade to A+, to be operational around 2027–2028.

=== Cosmic Explorer ===
A design for two larger observatories with longer arms is called "Cosmic Explorer". This is based on the LIGO Voyager technology, including a similar LIGO-type L-shape geometry, but with 20 and 40 km arms. It is currently planned to be on the surface. It has a higher sensitivity than Einstein Telescope for frequencies beyond 10 Hz, but lower sensitivity under 10 Hz.

== See also ==
- BlackGEM
- Cosmic Explorer, a proposed American third-generation gravitational wave detector
- Einstein Telescope, a proposed European third-generation gravitational wave detector
- Einstein@Home, a volunteer distributed computing program one can download in order to help the LIGO/GEO teams analyze their data
- Fermilab Holometer
- GEO600, a gravitational wave detector located in Hannover, Germany
- Laser Interferometer Space Antenna (LISA)
- LISA Pathfinder
- North American Nanohertz Observatory for Gravitational Waves
- PyCBC, an open source software package to help analyze LIGO data
- Richard A. Isaacson
- Taiji Program in Space, a future Chinese space-based gravitational wave detector
- Tests of general relativity
- TianQuin, a future Chinese space-based gravitational wave detector
- Virgo interferometer, an interferometer located close to Pisa, Italy
