= Primordial black hole =

Hypothetical black hole formed soon after the Big Bang

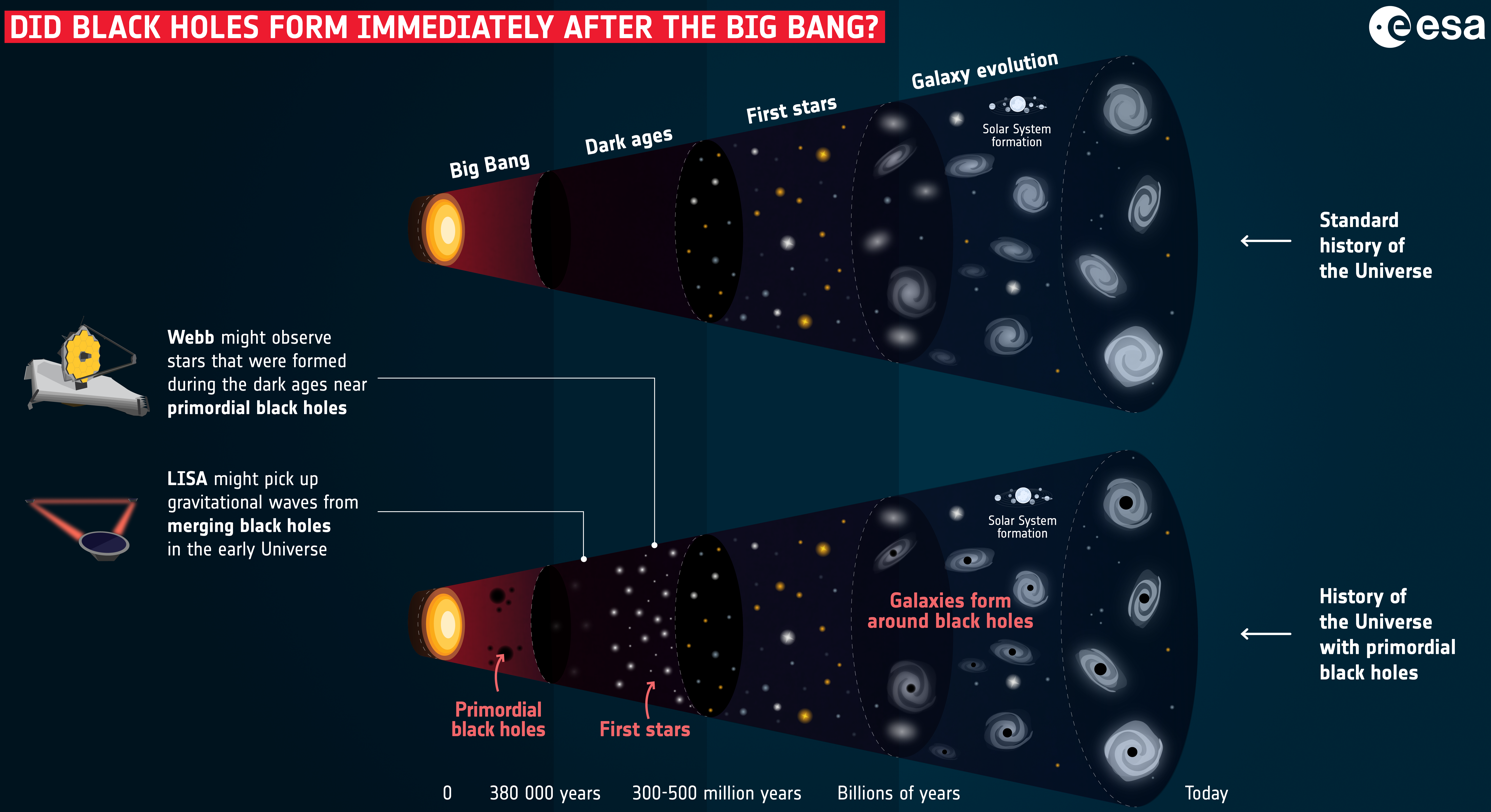
Formation of the universe without (above) and with (below) primordial black holes

In cosmology, primordial black holes (PBHs) are hypothetical black holes that formed soon after the Big Bang. In the inflationary era and early radiation-dominated universe, extremely dense pockets of subatomic matter may have been tightly packed to the point of gravitational collapse, creating primordial black holes without the supernova compression typically needed to make black holes today. Because the creation of primordial black holes would pre-date the first stars, they are not limited to the narrow mass range of stellar black holes.

First rejected in 1966 by Yakov Zeldovich and Igor Novikov then proposed by Stephen Hawking in 1971, these objects have been invoked to explain several issues in cosmology.

== Properties ==
Depending on the model, primordial black holes could have initial masses ranging from 10^{−8} kg (the so-called Planck relics) to more than thousands of solar masses. However, primordial black holes originally having masses lower than 10^{12} kg would not have survived to the present due to Hawking radiation, which causes complete evaporation in a time much shorter than the age of the Universe. Primordial black holes form before the nucleosynthesis responsible for observed baryonic matter, and as such are plausible dark matter candidates. Primordial black holes are also good candidates for being the seeds of the supermassive black holes at the center of massive galaxies, as well as of intermediate-mass black holes.

Primordial black holes belong to the class of massive compact halo objects (MACHOs). They are naturally a good dark matter candidate: they are (nearly) collision-less and stable (if sufficiently massive), they have non-relativistic velocities, and they form very early in the history of the Universe (typically less than one second after the Big Bang). Nevertheless, critics maintain that tight limits on their abundance have been set up from various astrophysical and cosmological observations, which would exclude that they contribute significantly to dark matter over most of the plausible mass range. However, new research has provided for the possibility again, whereby these black holes would sit in clusters that disperse at later times, with most black holes forming in the QCD matter epoch at around 1 or 30 solar masses.

PBHs have long been considered possibly important if not nearly exclusive components of dark matter, the latter perspective having been strengthened by both LIGO/Virgo interferometer gravitational wave and JWST observations. Early constraints on PBHs as dark matter usually assumed most black holes would have similar or identical ("monochromatic") mass, which was disproven by LIGO/Virgo results, and further suggestions that the actual black hole mass distribution is broadly platykurtic were evident from JWST observations of early large galaxies. Recent analyses agree, suggesting a broad mass distribution with a mode around one solar mass.

Many PBHs may have the mass of an asteroid but the size of a hydrogen atom and may be travelling at enormous speeds, with one likely being within the Solar System at any given time. Most likely, such PBHs would pass right through a star "like a bullet", without any significant effects on the star. However, the ones traveling slowly would have a chance of being captured by the star. Stephen Hawking proposed that the Sun may harbor such a PBH.

== History ==
In 1966, Yakov Zeldovich and Igor Novikov, reasoning on the basis of simplistic and flawed Newtonian model for accretion, concluded primordial black holes could not form. Stephen Hawking made a positive case in 1971 but assumed the resulting objects would be charged.

In 1974 Hawking recognized that quantum effects would be significant for small primordial black holes, leading him to predict they would emit radiation and evaporate. Additional studies followed exploring possible connections to cosmic rays and gamma ray bursts, but these studies were not confirmed by observations.

Renewed interest was sparked by observations of gravitational waves that might originate in PBH and by questions about the origin of supermassive black holes and the possible origin of dark halos.

In March 2016, one month after the announcement of the detection by Advanced LIGO/VIRGO of gravitational waves emitted by the merging of two 30-solar-mass black holes (about 6×10^{31} kg), three groups of researchers proposed independently that the detected black holes had a primordial origin. Two of the groups found that the merging rates inferred by LIGO are consistent with a scenario in which all the dark matter is made of primordial black holes, if a non-negligible fraction of them are somehow clustered within halos such as faint dwarf galaxies or globular clusters, as expected by the standard theory of cosmic structure formation. The third group claimed that these merging rates are incompatible with an all-dark-matter scenario and that primordial black holes could contribute only less than one percent of the total dark matter. The unexpected large mass of the black holes detected by LIGO has strongly revived interest in primordial black holes with masses in the range of 1 to 100 solar masses. It is still debated whether this range is excluded or not by other observations, such as the absence of micro-lensing of stars, the cosmic microwave background anisotropies, the size of faint dwarf galaxies, and the absence of correlation between X-ray and radio sources toward the galactic center.

In May 2016, Alexander Kashlinsky suggested that the observed spatial correlations in the unresolved gamma-ray and X-ray background radiations could be due to primordial black holes with similar masses, if their abundance is comparable to that of dark matter.

In August 2019, a study was published opening up the possibility of making up all dark matter with asteroid-mass primordial black holes (3.5 × 10^{−17} – 4 × 10^{−12} solar masses, or 7 × 10^{13} – 8 × 10^{18} kg).

In September 2019, a report by James Unwin and Jakub Scholtz proposed the possibility of a primordial black hole (PBH) with mass 5–15 M_{🜨} (Earth masses), about the diameter of a tennis ball, existing in the extended Kuiper Belt to explain the orbital anomalies that are theorized to be the result of a 9th planet in the solar system.

In October 2019, Derek Inman and Yacine Ali-Haïmoud published an article in which they discovered that the nonlinear velocities that arise from the structure formation are too small to significantly affect the constraints that arise from CMB anisotropies.

In September 2021, the NANOGrav collaboration announced that they had found a low-frequency signal that could be attributed to gravitational waves and potentially could be associated with PBHs.

In September 2022, primordial black holes were proposed by some researchers to explain the Little red dots, unexpectedly large galaxies formed very early in cosmological time as observed by the James Webb Space Telescope (JWST).

In September 2022, primordial black holes were used to explain the unexpected very large early (high-redshift) galaxies discovered by the James Webb Space Telescope.

On 26 November 2023, evidence, for the first time, of an overmassive black hole galaxy (O.B.G.), the result of "heavy black hole seed formation from direct collapse", an alternative way of producing a black hole other than the collapse of a dead star, was reported. This discovery was found in studies of UHZ1, a very early galaxy containing a quasar, by the Chandra X-ray Observatory and James Webb Space Telescope.

In 2024, Bernard Carr and colleagues concluded that PBHs formed in the quantum chromodynamics (QCD) epoch prior to 10^{–5} seconds after the Big Bang, resulting in a extended mass distribution "with a number of distinct bumps, the most prominent one being at around one solar mass."

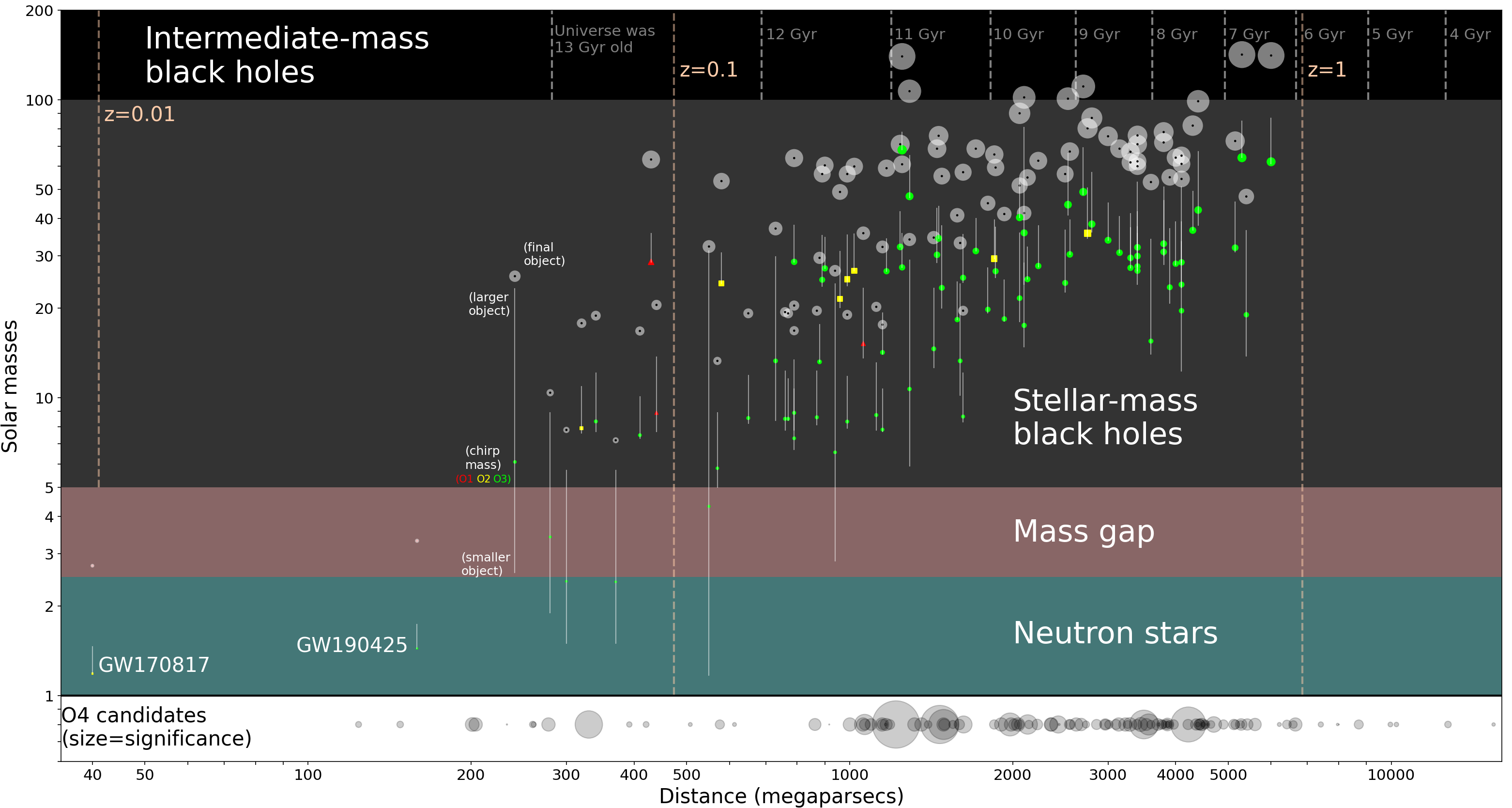
Gravitational wave detections

In November 2025, the LIGO/Virgo/KAGRA collaboration reported an unusual gravitational wave from a black hole merger with source masses small enough to suggest evidence for a sub-solar-mass black hole population such as primordial black holes formed in the early universe.

A review of the objects inferred from gravitational wave measurements provides constraints on the properties of PBH but the same data can be explained without assuming the existent of PBHs.

== Formation ==
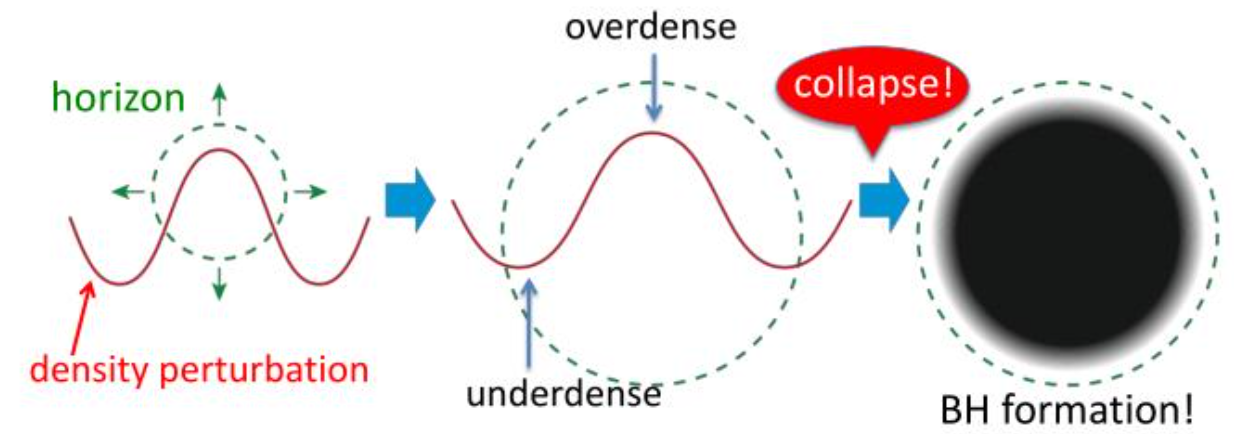
Primordial black holes were possibly formed by the collapse of overdense regions in the inflationary or early radiation-dominated universe.

Primordial black holes could have formed in the very early Universe (less than one second after the Big Bang) during the inflationary era, or in the very early radiation-dominated era. The essential ingredient for the formation of a primordial black hole is a fluctuation in the density of the Universe, inducing its gravitational collapse. One typically requires density contrasts $\delta \rho / \rho \sim 0.1$ (where $\rho$ is the density of the Universe) to form a black hole.

=== Production mechanisms ===
There are several mechanisms able to produce such inhomogeneities in the context of cosmic inflation (in hybrid inflation models). Some examples include:

==== Axion inflation ====
Axion inflation is a theoretical model in which the axion acts as an inflaton field. Because of the time period it is created at, the field is oscillating at its minimal potential energy. These oscillations are responsible for the energy density fluctuations in the early universe. For a review of production mechanisms arising from various models of inflation, see Ref.

==== Reheating ====
Reheating is the transitory process between the inflationary and the hot, dense, radiation-dominated period. During this time the inflaton field decays into other particles. These particles begin to interact in order to reach thermal equilibrium. However, if this process is incomplete it creates density fluctuations, and if these are big enough they could be responsible for the formation of PBHs.

==== Cosmological phase transitions ====
Cosmological phase transitions may cause inhomogeneities in different ways depending on the specific details of each transition. For example, one mechanism is concerned with the collapse of overdense regions that arise from these phase transitions, while another mechanism involves highly energetic particles that are produced in these phase transitions and then go through gravitational collapse forming PBHs.

==== Fine-tuning issues ====
The primary theoretical challenge to PBHs is the physical mechanism of their formation. Standard models of cosmic inflation, known as "slow-roll inflation," generate density fluctuations that are far too small to trigger primordial collapse. Consequently, producing the required abundance of PBHs to explain a substantial fraction of dark matter typically necessitates "exotic" inflation models, often featuring inflection points, bumps, or plateaus in the inflaton potential, which can amplify fluctuations by orders of magnitude. Critics argue that these models require significant fine-tuning, as the resulting PBH abundance is exponentially sensitive to the amplitude of these fluctuations, meaning that a slight deviation in parameters results in either a negligible amount of PBHs or a universe dominated entirely by them. However, proponents contend that as the natural parameter space for alternatives such as weakly interacting massive particles is increasingly excluded by null results from all detection experiments, particle dark matter theories now require comparable levels of fine-tuning. Furthermore, they argue that the mass structures predicted by such exotic inflation models provide a unified explanation for observational anomalies seen by LIGO and JWST that particle models do not address.

To address the fine-tuning problem, recent research has focused on mechanisms that generate the required fluctuations through natural physical processes rather than manual adjustments to the inflaton potential. One such mechanism is the QCD phase transition; as the universe cooled through this epoch, the reduction in the equation of state (pressure) naturally lowered the threshold for gravitational collapse. This effect automatically enhances the formation of black holes at the solar mass scale, comparable to those detected by gravitational wave observatories without requiring a precisely tuned peak in the inflation power spectrum. Additionally, models involving multiple scalar fields can produce sharp spikes in density fluctuations through dynamic interactions, such as rapid turns in the field trajectory, which derive the necessary conditions from the model's geometric structure rather than from fine-tuned parameters.

== Implications ==
=== Dark matter problem ===
The dark matter problem, proposed in 1933 by Swiss-American astronomer Fritz Zwicky, refers to the fact that scientists still do not know what form dark matter takes. PBHs can solve that in a few ways. First, if PBHs accounted for all or a significant amount of the dark matter in the universe, this could explain the gravitational effects seen in galaxies and galactic clusters. Secondly, PBHs have different proposed production mechanisms. Unlike WIMPs, they can emit gravitational waves that interact with regular matter. Finally, the discovery of PBHs could explain some of the observed gravitational lensing effects that couldn't arise from ordinary matter. While evidence that primordial black holes may constitute dark matter is inconclusive as of 2026, researchers such as Bernard Carr and others are strong proponents.

=== Galaxy formation ===
Since primordial black holes do not necessarily have to be small (they can have any size), they may have contributed to the formation of galaxies, such as those formed earlier than expected.

=== Cosmological domain wall problem ===
The cosmological domain wall problem, proposed in 1974 by Soviet physicist Yakov Zeldovich, discussed the formation of domain walls during phase transitions of the early universe and what could arise from their large energy densities. PBHs could serve as a solution to this problem in various ways. One explanation could be that PBHs can prevent the formation of domain walls due to them exerting gravitational forces on the surrounding matter, making it clump and theoretically preventing the formation of said walls. Another explanation could be that PBHs could decay domain walls; if these were formed in the early universe before PBHs, then due to gravitational interactions these could eventually collapse into PBHs. Finally, a third explanation could be that PBHs do not violate the observational constraints; if PBHs in the 10^{12}–10^{13} kg mass range were to be detected then these would have the right density to make up all dark matter in the universe without violating constraints, thus the domain wall problem wouldn't arise.

=== Cosmological monopole problem ===
The cosmological monopole problem, also proposed by Yakov Zeldovich in the late 1970s, consisted of the absence of magnetic monopoles nowadays. PBHs can also serve as a solution to this problem. To start, if magnetic monopoles did exist in the early universe these could have gravitationally interacted with PBHs and been absorbed, thus explaining their absence. Another explanation due to PBHs could be that PBHs would have exerted gravitational forces on matter, causing it to clump and dilute the density of magnetic monopoles.

=== String theory ===
The predicted effect of Hawking radiation implies that the smallest primordial black holes would have evaporated by now. But if there were a fourth spatial dimension – as predicted by string theory – it would affect how gravity acts on small scales and "slow down the evaporation quite substantially". In essence, the energy stored in the fourth spatial dimension as a stationary wave would bestow a significant rest mass to the object when regarded in the conventional four-dimensional space-time. This could mean there are several thousand primordial black holes in our galaxy. To test this theory, scientists will use the Fermi Gamma-ray Space Telescope, which was put into orbit by NASA on June 11, 2008. If they observe specific small interference patterns within gamma-ray bursts, it could be the first indirect evidence for primordial black holes and string theory.

== Observational limits and detection strategies ==
A variety of observations have been interpreted to place limits on the abundance and mass of primordial black holes:

Lifetime, Hawking radiation and gamma-rays: One way to detect primordial black holes, or to constrain their mass and abundance, is by their Hawking radiation. Stephen Hawking theorized in 1974 that large numbers of such smaller primordial black holes might exist in the Milky Way in our galaxy's halo region. All black holes are theorized to emit Hawking radiation at a rate inversely proportional to their mass. Since this emission further decreases their mass, black holes with very small mass would experience runaway evaporation, creating a burst of radiation at the final phase, equivalent to a hydrogen bomb yielding millions of megatons of explosive force. A regular black hole (of about 3 solar masses) cannot lose all of its mass within the current age of the universe (instead taking about 10^{69} years to do so, even without any matter falling in). However, since primordial black holes are not formed by stellar core collapse, they may be of any size. A black hole with a mass of about 10^{11} kg would have a lifetime about equal to the age of the universe. If such low-mass black holes were created in sufficient number in the Big Bang, we should be able to observe explosions by some of those that are relatively nearby in our own Milky Way galaxy. NASA's Fermi Gamma-ray Space Telescope satellite, launched in June 2008, was designed in part to search for such evaporating primordial black holes. Fermi data set up the limit that less than one percent of dark matter could be made of primordial black holes with masses up to 10^{13} kg. Evaporating primordial black holes would have also had an impact on the Big Bang nucleosynthesis and change the abundances of light elements in the Universe. However, if theoretical Hawking radiation does not actually exist, such primordial black holes would be extremely difficult, if not impossible, to detect in space due to their small size and lack of large gravitational influence.

Temperature anisotropies in the cosmic microwave background: Accretion of matter onto primordial black holes in the early Universe should lead to energy injection in the medium that affects the recombination history of the Universe. This effect induces signatures in the statistical distribution of the cosmic microwave background (CMB) anisotropies. The Planck observations of the CMB exclude that primordial black holes with masses in the range 100–10^{4} solar masses contribute importantly to the dark matter, at least in the simplest conservative model. It is still debated whether the constraints are stronger or weaker in more realistic or complex scenarios.

Gamma-ray signatures from annihilating dark matter: If the dark matter in the Universe is in the form of weakly interacting massive particles or WIMPs, primordial black holes would accrete a halo of WIMPs around them in the early universe. The annihilation of WIMPs in the halo leads to a signal in the gamma-ray spectrum that is potentially detectable by dedicated instruments such as the Fermi Gamma-ray Space Telescope.

In the future, new limits will be set up by various observations:

- The Square Kilometre Array (SKA) radio telescope will probe the effects of primordial black holes on the reionization history of the Universe, due to energy injection into the intergalactic medium, induced by matter accretion onto primordial black holes.
- LIGO, VIRGO and future gravitational wave detectors will detect new black hole merging events, from which one could reconstruct the mass distribution of primordial black holes. These detectors could allow distinguishing unambiguously between primordial or stellar origins if merging events involving black holes with a mass lower than 1.4 solar mass are detected. Another way would be to measure the large orbital eccentricity of primordial black hole binaries.
- Gravitational wave detectors, such as the Laser Interferometer Space Antenna (LISA) and pulsar timing arrays, will also probe the stochastic background of gravitational waves emitted by primordial black hole binaries when they are still orbiting relatively far from each other.
- New detections of faint dwarf galaxies, and observations of their central star clusters, could be used to test the hypothesis that these dark matter-dominated structures contain primordial black holes in abundance.
- Monitoring star positions and velocities within the Milky Way could be used to detect the influence of a nearby primordial black hole.
- It has been suggested that a small black hole passing through the Earth would produce a detectable acoustic signal. Because of its tiny diameter and large mass as compared to a nucleon, as well as its relatively high speed, a primordial black hole would simply transit Earth virtually unimpeded with only a few impacts on nucleons, exiting the planet with no ill effects.
- Another way to detect primordial black holes could be by watching for ripples on the surfaces of stars. If the black hole passed through a star, its density would cause observable vibrations.
- Monitoring quasars in the microwave wavelength and detection of the wave optics feature of gravitational microlensing by the primordial black holes.
- Observing deviations in the motion of Solar System objects, such as the planet Mars, which could arise from the rapid transit of a primordial black hole through the inner Solar System.

== Measurement techniques ==
None of these facilities are focused on the direct detection of PBHs due to them being a theoretical phenomenon, but the information collected in each respective experiment provides secondary data that can help provide insight and constraints on the nature of PBHs.

=== GW-detectors ===
- LIGO/VIRGO – These detectors already place important constraints on the limits of PBHs. However, they're always searching for new unexpected signals; if they detect a black hole in the mass range that does not correspond to stellar evolution theory, it could serve as evidence for PBHs.
- Cosmic Explorer/Einstein Telescope – Both of these projects serve as the next generation of LIGO/VIRGO; they will increase sensitivity around the 10–100 Hz band and allow probing for PBH information at higher redshifts.
- NANOGrav – This collaboration detected a stochastic signal, but it is not yet a certified gravitational wave signal since quadrupolar correlations have not been detected. But, should this be confirmed, it could serve as evidence for sub-solar-mass PBHs.
- Laser Interferometer Space Antenna (LISA) – Like any GW detector, LISA has great potential to detect PBHs. The uniqueness of LISA lies with its ability to detect extreme mass ratio inspirals when low-mass black holes merge with massive objects. Due to its sensitivity it will also allow for the detection and confirmation of stochastic NANOGrav signals.
- AEDGE Atomic Experiment for Dark Matter and Gravity Exploration in Space – This proposed mid-range gravitational wave experiment has a uniqueness that lies in its detection ability of intermediate mass ratio mergers like the ones theorized during early supermassive black hole assembly; should the detection of these happen it would serve as evidence for PBHs.

=== Space telescopes ===
- Nancy Grace Roman Space Telescope (WFIRST) – As a space telescope, WFIRST will have the capacity of detecting or at least placing constraints on PBHs through different types of lensing. When an object passes in front of a known light source, such as a star, it slightly (to the order of microarcseconds) shifts its position; this can be measured using astrometric lensing.

=== Sky Surveys ===
- Vera C. Rubin Observatory (LSST) – This will provide the capability of directly measuring the mass function of compact objects by microlensing. It will be able to observe both low and high-mass objects, thus placing constraints on both sides of the spectrum. LSST will also have the ability to detect Kilonovae that lack gravitational wave signals related to the existence of PBHs.

=== Very Large Arrays ===
VLA – the next generation Very Large Array will be able to improve GW bounds by an order of magnitude over the current constraints placed by the NANOGrav. This increased sensitivity will be able to confirm the nature of GW signals from NANOGrav. It will also be able to discriminate a PBH explanation from other sources.

=== Fast Radio Burst observatories ===
Experiments like these obtain large numbers of Fast Radio Bursts and promote the statistical measures of their lensing, which would allow for PBH lenses. Some examples include:

- Canadian Hydrogen Intensity Mapping Experiment (CHIME)
- Hydrogen Intensity and Real-time Analysis eXperiment (HIRAX)
- CHORD (Successor to CHIME)

=== MeV Gamma-Ray Telescopes ===
Since the MeV gamma-ray band has yet to be explored, proposed experiments could place tighter constraints on the abundance of PBHs in the asteroid-mass range. Some examples of the proposed telescopes include:

- AdEPT
- AMEGO
- All-Sky ASTROGAM
- GECCO
- GRAMS
- MAST
- PANGU

=== GeV and TeV Gamma-Ray Observatories ===
PBHs in the mass range of ~ 5×10^{−19} solar masses would be producing TeV gamma rays due to evaporation. Since these would occur in isotropic bursts across the sky, wide field survey observatories would be ideal to search for these. A few examples could be:

- FGST's LAT
- High Altitude Water Cherenkov Experiment (HAWC)
- Southern Wide-field Gamma-ray Observatory (SWGO)

=== Atmospheric Cherenkov telescopes ===
Atmospheric Cherenkov telescope have a narrow field of view, but they have great sensitivity for TeV cosmic rays and thus can provide upper limits on the burst rate density. Some of these telescopes are:

- Very Energetic Radiation Imaging Telescope Array System (VERITAS)
- Major Atmospheric Gamma Imaging Cherenkov Telescopes (MAGIC)
- High Energy Stereoscopic System (HESS)
- Cherenkov Telescope Array (CTA)

== Difference from direct collapse black holes ==
A direct collapse black hole is the result of the collapse of unusually dense and large regions of gas, after the radiation-dominated era, while primordial black holes would have resulted from the direct collapse of energy, ionized matter, or both, during the inflationary or radiation-dominated eras.

== See also ==
- Primordial gravitational wave
- Primordial fluctuations
