= Einstein Telescope =

Proposed gravitational wave detector

- Named after: Albert Einstein
- Website: einsteintelescope.eu

Einstein Telescope (ET), is a planned third-generation ground-based gravitational wave (GW) detector, currently under study by some institutions in the European Union. It will be able to test Einstein's general theory of relativity in strong field conditions, realize precision gravitational wave astronomy and enable multi-messenger astronomy.

== History ==
The initial design study project was supported by the European Commission under the Framework Programme 7 (FP7). It concerned the study and the conceptual design for a new research infrastructure in the emergent field of gravitational-wave astronomy. The ET Project was accepted onto the roadmap of the European Strategy Forum on Research Infrastructures in 2021. In 2022, the ET Collaboration was founded as the organization of scientists working on the realization and future operation of the ET. In 2025, support for ET was expressed on the national levels: the governments of Netherlands and Belgium set ET as one of the national priorities; the German government placed ET on a shortlist for large scientific infrastructures and highlighted as a top European scientific project in a coalition agreement; the regional Italian government set ET as one of the top priorities, following previously expressed commitment by the national government. It is expected that in 2027 the site location will be announced, with construction starting in 2028 and the detector launch in 2035.

== Motivation ==
Second generation gravitational-wave detectors, Advanced Virgo, Advanced LIGO and KAGRA, are approaching their design sensitivity, with the final set of updates completed by the fifth observational run in 2028. Future possible upgrades would reach the facility limits, imposed by the external factors, such as the achievable arm length and local seismology. Many science cases require significant sensitivity increase towards low frequencies, where current detectors are fundamentally limited by seismic noise.

The strategy for the third generation gravitational-wave detectors, which includes Einstein Telescope and proposed Cosmic Explorer in the US, is to significantly increase the arm length and laser power in the arms. Einstein Telescope further aims to increase the sensitivity towards signals at a few Hz by going deep underground and suppressing thermal noise of its mirrors and suspensions with cryogenic operation.

The main science case for the Einstein Telescope includes, among others:

- Testing Einstein's general theory of relativity: studying the nature of black holes, looking for deviations from Lorentz invariance and testing alternative gravity theories.
- Searching for dark matter, such as ultralight bosons
- Stochastic GW searches: looking for spectral features, anisotropies and polarization content of the background can point to the large scale structure of the Universe, various processes in the early Universe and the population studies.
- Early Universe cosmology: looking for GWs from inflation, phase transitions, cosmic strings and domain walls collisions as well primordial black holes
- Multi-messenger observations: early warnings for the upcoming GW events as well as precise localisation of the events observable with electromagnentic, neutrino or other telescopes.
- Population studies for black holes, neutron stars and their stellar environments.
- Subatomic physics with neutron star observations: GWs from neutron stars collisions carry information about the equation of state of the ultra-dense matter inside neutron stars, offering a unique insight into the properties of various subatomic processes.

== Detector design ==
The goal of the detector design is to achieve high sensitivity (~ factor of 10 compared to the existing detectors) in a frequency band from a few Hz to >2 kHz. The main limitations to the sensitivity of the detector are:

- Newtonian gravity noise: direct coupling of the local matter density fluctuations into the motion of the test masses through gravitational attraction.
  - It limits the sensitivity at very low frequency, and cannot be directly suppressed due to its nature. There are two solutions to reducing its impact: independently measuring it and subtracting in post-processing and moving the detector in a seismically quiet place — i.e. underground.
- Seismic noise: natural and anthropogenic vibrations of the earth coupled to the motion of the test mirrors at low frequency through suspensions.
  - Moving underground and employing passive multi-stage pendulum isolation as well as active isolation allows to limit it.
- Brownian thermal noise: fluctuations in the suspensions, test masses substrates and coatings due to the Brownian thermal motion.
  - This noise limits the sensitivity at very low frequencies. According to the fluctuation-dissipation theorem, these fluctuations depend on material losses and on the temperature of the material. Therefore, going to cryogenic cooling of the test masses and suspensions allows to suppress thermal noise.
- Quantum noise: noise due to the quantization of the light field, coupled to the measurement uncertainty and to the motion of the test masses through radiation pressure.
  - Quantum squeezed light allows to suppress this noise. It is required to use frequency-dependent squeezing to suppress it in a broad band. This requires the use of high-quality long (km-scale) optical cavities or other advanced quantum techniques.

Increasing the light power circulating in the arms increases the sensitivity of a detector. However, due to the light absorption in the material, high laser power is not compatible with cryogenic operation. Therefore, ET features a so-called xylophone configuration, where two co-located interferometers target two different frequency bands: low frequency (LF) between ~2 Hz and 30 Hz and high frequency (HF) between 30 Hz and 2kHz:

- ET-LF uses cryogenic cooling to 10-20 K and low laser power in the arms (18 kW, compare to the design 800kW for Advanced LIGO).
- ET-HF is room-temperature and high-power with 3 MW inside the arms.

Generally, using long arms allows to increase the detector sensitivity. There are two alternative designs that feature 10km (triangle configuration) and 15km (2-L configuration).

- Triangle configuration uses 3 pairs of interferometers with central stations arranged at the vertices of a triangle with 10km sides. Building the triangle would require 60° angle between the two arms of each interferometer, unlike 90° in a traditional L-shaped layout.
- 2L configuration uses 2 pairs of interferometers located in two far separated geographical locations, each with 15km arm length.

Both configurations come with their own advantages and challenges.

== Prototypes ==
A number of prototyping activities, dedicated to various aspects of ET technology, are operating or under development.

=== ETpathfinder ===
A prototype, or testing facility, called the ETpathfinder was built at Maastricht University's Randwyck Campus in the Netherlands. The facility was opened in November 2021 by Dutch Minister of Education, Culture and Science, Ingrid van Engelshoven. Project leader is Professor Stefan Hild. A focus of the facility is the development of technologies for cryogenic gravitational wave detectors. ETpathfinder will be a useful research centre in its own right after the ET has been built.

=== E-TEST ===
A prototype of a large suspended mirror at a cryogenic temperature under construction in Liège, Belgium.

=== CAOS ===
A center in Perugia, Italy, dedicated to testing mechanical and optical systems for ET.

=== WAVE ===
An initiative in Hamburg, Germany, dedicated to testing environmental monitoring and Newtonian noise mitigation for ET, among other goals.

=== AEI-10m ===
A 10m interferometer prototype in Hanover, Germany, targeted at ultra-low noise performance for testing prototype technologies.

== Site location ==
Several geographic locations are considered as possible sites hosting Einstein Telescope.

=== The Meuse-Rhine Euroregion proposal ===
In 2015, the Meuse-Rhine Euroregion, specifically the rural area between Maastricht, Liège and Aachen, was mentioned as one of the ET's possible sites. The Meuse–Rhine Euroregion has stable ground with little disturbance to the environment. It also has a network of knowledge partners to cooperate with, companies that can supply the high-tech, and pleasant, accessible living and working environments.

The Einstein Telescope involves a triangular-shaped tunnel with arms of 10 kilometres long. The telescope will be located 250 to 300 metres underground. At the three vertices there will be large underground chambers. Laser beams run through the 10-kilometre arms, the tunnel tubes. A laser beam is split into two beams and these are reflected by mirrors at the ends of the arms in the underground chambers. From the three vertices, a lift will reach ground level. Maintenance will be carried out inside the tunnel via these shafts.

From 2021, Nikhef will carry out exploratory drilling in Terziet, Banholt, Cottessen and various locations in the German–Belgian border area. In April 2022, the Dutch gouvernment made €42 million available from the National Growth Fund for preparatory work of the ET and also reserved €870 million for construction. As the Einstein Telescope is an international project, the Netherlands, Belgium and Germany are cooperating in feasibility studies for the telescope in the Meuse-Rhine Euroregion. For example, studies are under way into the differences in planning laws and regulations and their significance for the project. Ultimately, these feasibility studies should lead to a bid book, which will be ready in 2025 at the earliest.

=== The Italian proposal ===
The Italian government is ready to support the candidacy of Sos Enattos (Sardinia) as a place for the construction of the telescope together with the Nobel prizewinner Giorgio Parisi.

Sos Enattos was chosen for the functional characteristics of the project of the site on the island:

- It has been classified as one of the quietest places on earth: the seismic activity that interferes with the detection of gravitational waves is essentially nil.
- The presence of an underground mine that would be used for the allocation of the telescope: the solidity and stability of the rock make it possible to build large underground quarries with confidence.
- The presence of groundwater in the area reduces the possibility of having problems with infiltration or seismic and Newtonian noise.
- The impact on employment would be impressive: in the nine years of construction, considering direct and induced effects, employment is estimated at 36,000 units, with a local induced (65–75% of the total amount) equal to a turnover of 4.329 billion euros.

In January 2021 seismological surveys were carried out to validate the site, installing 15 seismometric stations near the Sos Enattos mine.

In September 2022, the Draghi government mandated the president of INFN Antonio Zoccoli to proceed with the creation of Italy's candidacy dossier, confirming the 350 million euro of economic commitment already allocated by the Sardinia Region.

=== Saxony proposal ===
In 2024, the government of Saxony (Germany) has proposed the third candidate site in the Lusatia region of Saxony as a part of the German Center for Astrophysics (Deutsches Zentrum für Astrophysik, DZA). Geological characteristics of the region feature a large granite massif that provides exceptional seismic stability.

== Technical groups of ET-FP7 ==
Through its four technical working groups, the ET-FP7 project is addressing the basic questions in the realization of this proposed observatory: site location and characteristics (WP1), suspension design and technologies (WP2), detector topology and geometry (WP3), detection capabilities requirements and astrophysics potentialities (WP4).

=== Participants ===
ET is a design study project in the European Framework Programme (FP7). It has been proposed by 8 European leading gravitational wave experimental research institutes, coordinated by the European Gravitational Observatory:

- (European Union) European Gravitational Observatory
- (Italy) Istituto Nazionale di Fisica Nucleare
- (Germany) Max-Planck-Gesellschaft zur Förderung der Wissenschaften e. V., acting through Max-Planck-Institut für Gravitationsphysik
- (France) Centre National de la Recherche Scientifique
- (England) University of Birmingham
- (Scotland) University of Glasgow
- (Netherlands) Nikhef
- (Wales) Cardiff University

== See also ==
- Tests of general relativity
- EGO, the European Gravitational Observatory
- LIGO, two gravitational wave detectors located in the United States
- Virgo, a gravitational wave detector located in Italy
- GEO 600, a gravitational wave detector located in Hannover, Germany
- Cosmic Explorer, a proposed third generation ground-based gravitational wave observatory
- Einstein@Home, a volunteer distributed computing program to help the LIGO/GEO teams analyze their data
- Taiji Program in Space, a space-based Chinese gravitational wave detector
