= Max Planck Institute for Gravitational Physics =

Physics Institute in Potsdam and Hanover

Coordinates: 52°24′59″N 12°58′9″E

Max Planck Institute for Gravitational Physics (Albert Einstein Institute)
- Institute's logo
- Abbreviation: AEI
- Formation: 1995
- Type: non-profit research organization
- Headquarters: Potsdam-Golm and Hannover, Germany
- Management: managing director Masaru Shibata and deputy managing director Karsten Danzmann
- Main organ: Max Planck Society
- Website: www.aei.mpg.de

The Max Planck Institute for Gravitational Physics (Albert Einstein Institute) is a Max Planck Institute whose research is aimed at investigating Einstein's theory of relativity and beyond: Mathematics, quantum gravity, astrophysical relativity, and gravitational-wave astronomy. The institute was founded in 1995 and is located in the Potsdam Science Park in Golm, Potsdam and in Hannover where it closely collaborates with the Leibniz University Hannover. Both the Potsdam and the Hannover parts of the institute are organized in three research departments and host a number of independent research groups.

The institute conducts fundamental research in mathematics, data analysis, astrophysics and theoretical physics as well as research in laser physics, vacuum technology, vibration isolation and classical and quantum optics.

When the LIGO Scientific Collaboration announced the first detection of gravitational waves, researchers of the institute were involved in modeling, detecting, analysing and characterising the signals. The institute is part of a number of collaborations and projects: it is a main partner in the gravitational-wave detector GEO600; institute scientists are developing waveform-models that are applied in the gravitational-wave detectors for detecting and characterising gravitational waves. They are developing detector technology and are also analyzing data from the detectors of the LIGO Scientific Collaboration, the Virgo Collaboration and the KAGRA Collaboration. They also play a leading role in planning and preparing the space-based detector LISA (planned launch date: 2034) and are involved in developing the third generation of earth-bound gravitational-wave detectors (Einstein Telescope, Cosmic Explorer). The institute is also a major player in the Einstein@Home and PyCBC projects.

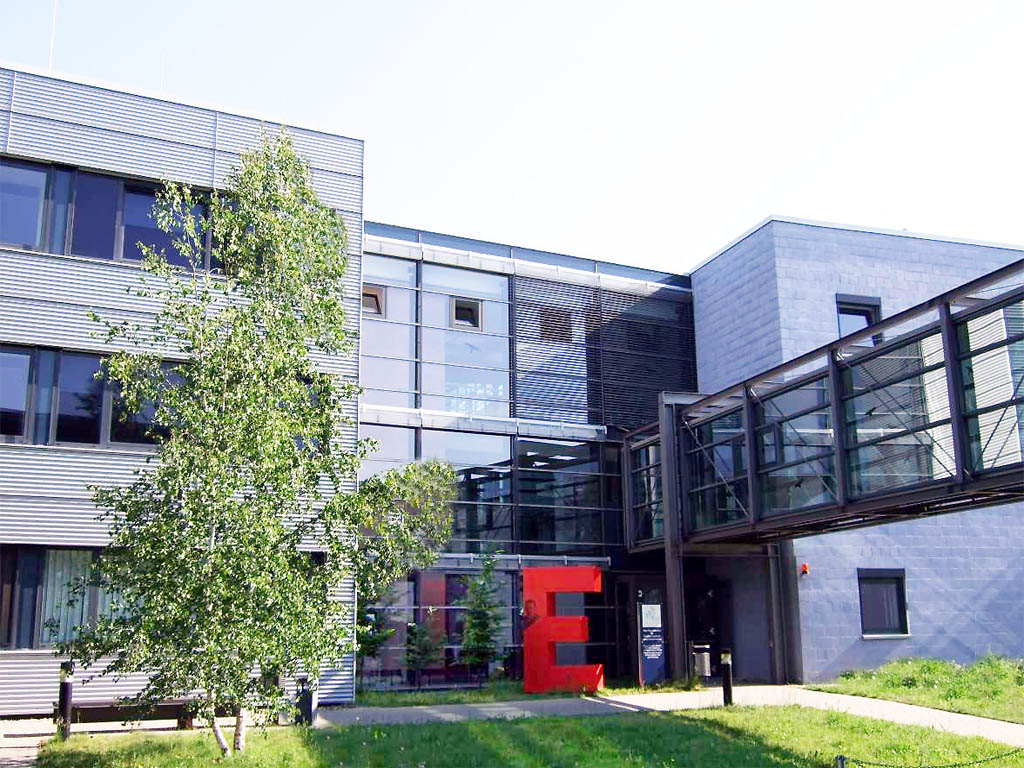
The Max Planck Institute for Gravitational Physics in Potsdam-Golm.

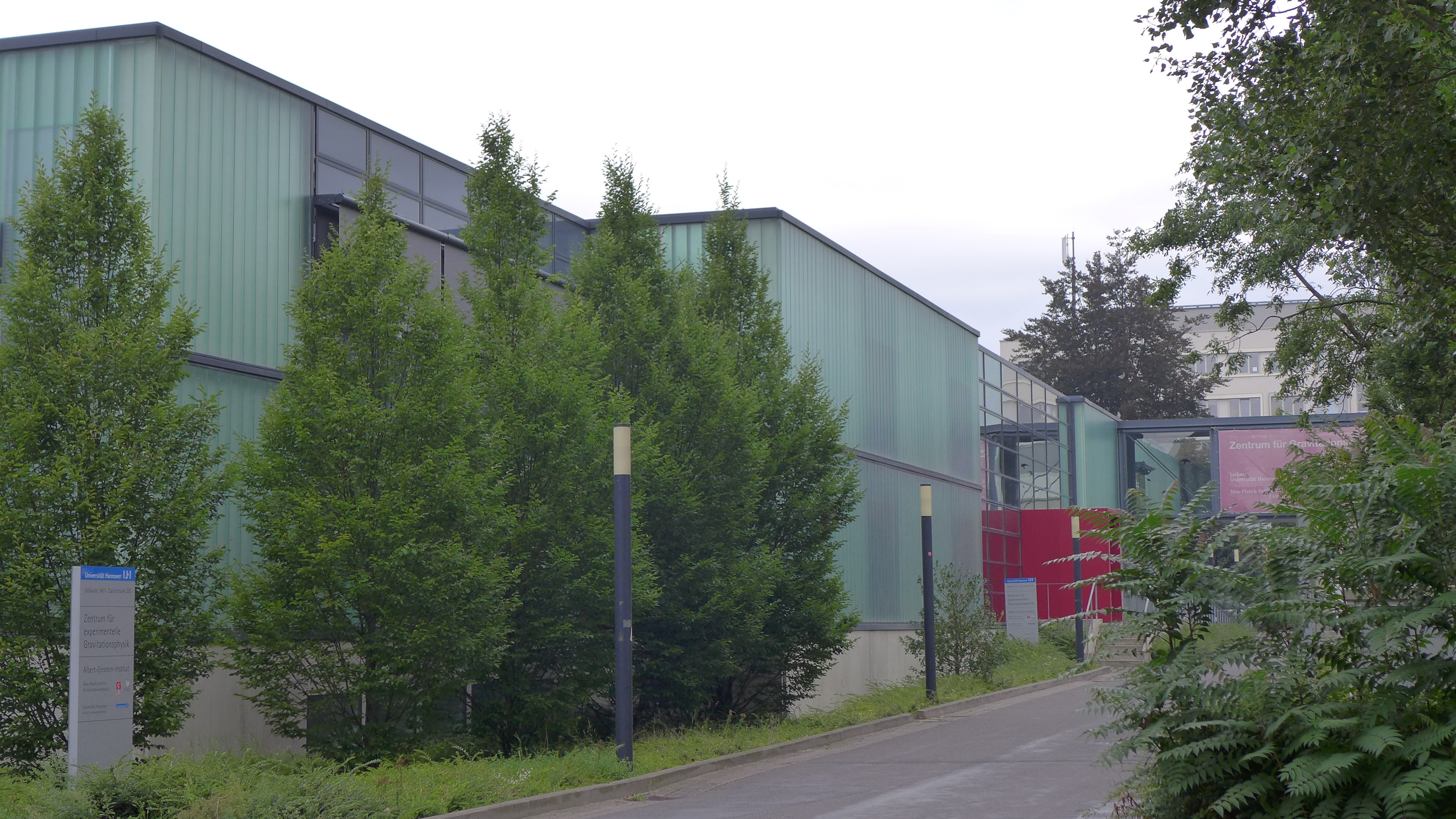
The Max Planck Institute for Gravitational Physics in Hannover.

From 1998 to 2015, the institute has published the open access review journal Living Reviews in Relativity.

== History ==
The newly founded institute started its work in April 1995 and has been located in Potsdam-Golm since 1999.

In 2002 the institute opened a branch at the Universität Hannover with a focus on data analysis and the development and operation of gravitational-wave detectors on Earth and in space. The Hannover institute originated from the Institute for Atom and Molecule Physics (AMP) of the Universität Hannover, which was established in 1979 by the Department of Physics.

== Research ==
The research focus of the institute is in the field of general relativity. It covers theoretical and experimental gravitational physics, quantum gravity, multi-messenger astronomy and cosmology. The institute has a strong research focus on gravitational-wave astronomy: five out of six departments are working on different aspects of this research field. Central research topics are:

- source modeling (binary neutron stars, binary black holes, mixed binaries, stellar core collapse)
- experimental work on gravitational-wave detectors – both on Earth and in space
- solving the two-body problem in general relativity
- analytical and numerical solutions of Einstein's equations
- development and implementation of data analysis algorithms for gravitational-wave searches
- follow-up analyses to infer properties of the gravitational-wave sources
- searches for particles and fundamental interactions beyond the standard model

All these efforts enable a new kind of astronomy, which began with the first direct detection of gravitational waves on Earth.

Scientists of the institute also work towards the unification of the fundamental theories of physics – general relativity and quantum mechanics – into a theory of quantum gravity.

== Departments ==
- Alessandra Buonanno's Astrophysical and Cosmological Relativity department at AEI Potsdam solves the two-body problem in general relativity analytically and numerically, and predicts gravitational-wave signals emitted by binary systems composed of black holes and neutron stars. Members of the department use those waveform models to infer astrophysical and cosmological information, and carry out tests of general relativity, using data from gravitational-wave detectors.
- Masaru Shibata's Computational Relativistic Astrophysics department at AEI Potsdam studies mergers of black holes or neutron stars and the collapse of stellar cores. The department also works on more fundamental aspects of general relativity with numerical tools.
- The Quantum Gravity and Unified Theories department (acting director since August 2020: Alessandra Buonanno) at AEI Potsdam works on the development of a quantum theory of gravity, based on conformal field theory, string theory, and supergravity and symmetries.
- The research focus of Karsten Danzmann's department Laser Interferometry and Gravitational Wave Astronomy at AEI Hannover is on the development and operation of gravitational-wave detectors on Earth and in space. This includes laboratory experiments in quantum optics and laser physics.
- Bruce Allen's department Observational Relativity and Cosmology at AEI Hannover studies observational consequences of general relativity, including the search for and analysis of gravitational-wave signals in data from ground-based detectors, and the operation of the Einstein@Home project. The department also works on searches for gamma-ray and radio pulsars, and on theoretical aspects of black holes.
- The department Precision Interferometry and Fundamental Interactions at AEI Hannover, led by Guido Müller, focuses its activity on LISA and other space-based and ground-based gravitational-wave astronomy and on searches for fundamental interactions beyond the standard model using laser-optical methods.

== Directors ==
- Bruce Allen (AEI Hannover, 2007–present)
- Alessandra Buonanno (AEI Potsdam, 2014–present)
- Karsten Danzmann (AEI Hannover, 2002–present), deputy managing director
- Jürgen Ehlers (AEI Potsdam, founding director, 1995–1998)
- Gerhard Huisken (AEI Potsdam, 2002–2013)
- Guido Müller (AEI Hannover, 2022–present)
- Hermann Nicolai (AEI Potsdam, 1997–2020)
- Bernard F. Schutz (AEI Potsdam, founding director, 1995–2014)
- Masaru Shibata (AEI Potsdam, 2018–present), managing director

== Independent research groups ==
=== Permanent independent research groups ===
- Geometry and Gravitation at AEI Potsdam. This research group studies fundamental questions in the theory of gravity and related physical theories with mathematical methods.
- Searching for Continuous Gravitational Waves (led by M. Alessandra Papa) at AEI Hannover. This research group works on searches for as of today undetected continuous gravitational waves, which are expected from rapidly rotating neutron stars.

=== Independent research groups ===
- Binary Merger Observations and Numerical Relativity (led by Frank Ohme) at AEI Hannover. The independent research group works on gravitational-wave data analysis and predictions of wave forms for signals from merging black holes and neutron stars. The studies are based on numerical simulations of these processes.
- Exceptional Quantum Gravity (Emeritus group, led by Hermann Nicolai) at AEI Potsdam. This research group is funded by an ERC Advanced Grant. Its research is concerned with a symmetry-based approach to a consistent theory of quantum gravity
- Multi-messenger Astrophysics of Compact Binaries (led by Tim Dietrich) at AEI Potsdam. This Max Planck Fellow research group investigates the electromagnetic and gravitational-wave emission from binary neutron star mergers using numerical relativity methods.

== Max Planck Partner Groups ==
Max Planck Partner Groups carry out research in fields overlapping with those of the former host Max Planck institute. They are established to support junior scientists returning to their home country after a research stay at a Max Planck Institute.

The Max Planck Institute for Gravitational Physics has one Max Planck Partner Group:

- at the Indian Institute of Technology Kanpur, India, collaborating with the "Quantum Gravity and Unified Theories" department

== Collaborative projects ==
=== Advanced LIGO and advanced Virgo ===
At AEI Hannover and AEI Potsdam, there are two LIGO Scientific Collaboration groups concerned with theory and data analysis of the LIGO and Virgo detectors. At AEI Hannover there is also the GEO group concerned with various experimental topics. AEI researchers in Potsdam and Hannover analyse LIGO and Virgo data. They also develop predictions of gravitational-wave signals used for the search for mergers of black holes and neutron stars and their interpretation.

The AEI Hannover is a partner institution in the advanced LIGO project and contributed the pre-stabilized laser system for the advanced LIGO detectors in Hanford and Livingston. AEI researchers help commissioning and operating the advanced LIGO interferometers.

In early 2018 researchers at AEI Hannover have developed, built, and helped install a squeezed-light source at the Advanced Virgo gravitational-wave detector. During the third joint observation run of the gravitational-wave detectors, it reduced the quantum-mechanical background noise by about third, increasing the expected detection rate of binary neutron star mergers by up to 26%.

=== Einstein Telescope ===
Researchers at AEI contribute to the planning, development of, and the science case for the Einstein Telescope (ET), a third-generation gravitational-wave detector in Europe. The ET steering committee co-chair is at AEI Hannover, and laser technology for the ET Prototype in Maastricht is to be developed at AEI Hannover. AEI Potsdam researchers contribute to developing wave-form models for third generation gravitational-wave detectors such as the Einstein Telescope.

=== GEO600 ===
The GEO600 gravitational-wave detector south of Hannover was designed and is operated by scientists from the Max Planck Institute for Gravitational Physics and the Leibniz Universität Hannover, along with partners in the United Kingdom.

=== LISA Pathfinder ===
LISA Pathfinder was a test mission by ESA for the Laser Interferometer Space Antenna (LISA). It demonstrated key technologies for gravitational-wave detection in space. The Max Planck Institute for Gravitational Physics in Hannover and the Institute for Gravitational Physics at Leibniz Universität Hannover were responsible for and coordinated the German contribution to the mission.

During the operations phase, Max Planck and Leibniz Universität researchers in Hannover were partners in the mission's data analysis. They also played a leading role developing the analysis software LTPDA, a MATLAB toolbox. AEI scientist took part in the mission operations shifts at ESOC.

=== LISA ===
The space-based gravitational-wave observatory LISA is developed under ESA leadership in collaboration with a scientific consortium. The LISA consortium is led by AEI director Karsten Danzmann. At AEI Hannover and AEI Potsdam there are LISA Consortium groups. At AEI Hannover there are large laboratories for LISA laser interferometry experiments.

=== GRACE Follow-On ===
GRACE-FO is a satellite-based geodesy mission that takes detailed measurements of the Earth's gravitational field and its temporal and spatial variations by interferometric distance measurements between two satellites. The laser ranging interferometer used for this purpose is a cooperation between NASA and German partners, with the German contribution led by the AEI. The instrument's concept, its prototypes and technical specifications were done at the AEI. AEI researchers have been involved in developing and testing the flight hardware.

== Graduate Program ==
The institute participates in two International Max Planck Research Schools (IMPRS). Such research schools are graduate programs run by Max Planck Institutes in partnership with local universities, offering a Ph.D. degree. The IMPRS for Mathematical and Physical Aspects of Gravitation, Cosmology and Quantum Field Theory partners with the Institute for Mathematics at University of Potsdam, the Institute of Physics at Humboldt University, IIT Bombay, Chennai Mathematical Institute, and the Institute of Theoretical Physics of the Chinese Academy of Sciences

The IMPRS on Gravitational Wave Astronomy is run in two collaborating branches, one in Hannover and one in Potsdam-Golm. The Hannover branch cooperates with the Leibniz University Hannover and the Laser Zentrum Hannover e.V.. The Potsdam branch partners with the Humboldt University, the University of Potsdam and the Leibniz Institute for Astrophysics. It cooperates with the IMPRS for Mathematical and Physical Aspects of Gravitation, Cosmology and Quantum Field Theory (also at AEI Potsdam), the master's degree program in astrophysics at the University of Potsdam, the Astrophysics Network Potsdam, the Yukawa Institute for Theoretical Physics at Kyoto University, and the University of Maryland.

== Jürgen Ehlers Spring School ==
The institute offers an annual two-week spring school for 40 international students of mathematics and physics. Each year, the lectures, exercises, and discussions cover different topics from the institute's research expertise. Lectures are held by researchers from the institute.

The Jürgen Ehlers Spring School was established in 2000 and is named after the institute's founding director Jürgen Ehlers.

== Outreach ==
=== Public events ===
The institute's outreach activities include Open Days at the AEI Potsdam and at the GEO600 gravitational-wave detector, participation in the Girls' Days and Future Days, popular science talks by researchers, participation in the "November der Wissenschaft" in Hannover, tours of the institutes including selected laboratories and computer clusters, and a program for visits and presentations by researchers at high schools.

=== Einstein Online ===
The institute runs the popular-science webportal Einstein Online, which is a hypertext network with introductory and in-depth articles about Einstein's theory of relativity and its consequences.

=== Journalist in Residence ===
Since 2018, the institute has been offering a Journalists-in-Residence program to science journalists. The goal is to improve the communication between journalists and scientists, and to provide deeper insight into the institute's research.

=== Einstein@Home ===
The institute together with the University of Wisconsin–Milwaukee is one of the two host institutions of the distributed volunteer computing project Einstein@Home. Einstein@Home aggregates computing time on volunteers' computers to search for signals from rotating neutron stars in data from the LIGO gravitational-wave detectors, from large radio telescopes, and from the Fermi Gamma-ray Space Telescope.
