= PSR J2007+2722 =

Pulsar in the constellation Vulpecula

Observation data Epoch J2000 Equinox ICRS
- Constellation: Vulpecula
- Right ascension: 20^{h} 07^{m} 15.77^{s}
- Declination: +27° 22′ 47.7″

Characteristics
- Spectral type: Pulsar

Astrometry
Distance	17,000 ly (5,300 pc)

Details
Rotation	40.820677605083 Hz; 24.497388545933 ms
Age	404 Myr

Other designations
- PSR J2007+2722

Database references
SIMBAD	data

PSR J2007+2722 is a 40.82-hertz (24.497 milliseconds) isolated pulsar in the constellation Vulpecula, 5.3 kpc (17,000 ly) distant in the plane of the Galaxy, and is most likely a disrupted recycled pulsar (DRP).

PSR J2007+2722 was found on data taken by the Arecibo radio telescope in February 2007, and analyzed by volunteers Chris and Helen Colvin (Ames, Iowa, United States) and Daniel Gebhardt (Universität Mainz, Musikinformatik, Germany) via the distributed computing project Einstein@Home.
