= M. Alessandra Papa =

Italian physicist

Maria Alessandra Papa (born 1967) is an Italian physicist specializing in the observation of gravitational waves. She is a professor of gravitational wave astronomy at Leibniz University Hannover, and a researcher at the Max Planck Institute for Gravitational Physics (Albert Einstein Institute). At the Max Planck Institute, she heads the Permanent Independent Research Group on Continuous Gravitational Waves; these are waves expected to be emitted continuously from rapidly rotating neutron stars, unlike the waves that have been detected from black hole and neutron star merger events. She also coordinates the use of the Einstein@Home project for volunteer computing in the search for gravitational waves in LIGO data.

== Education and career ==
Papa was born in Rome on 6 June 1967. She earned a laurea at Sapienza University of Rome in 1993, and completed a PhD in 1997 at the University of Rome Tor Vergata under the supervision of Valeria Ferrari and Guido Pizzella.

After postdoctoral research at the Max Planck Institute for Gravitational Physics and Istituto Nazionale di Fisica Nucleare, she became a permanent staff scientist at the Max Planck Institute in 2003. She moved to the University of Wisconsin–Milwaukee as a tenure-track and later tenured researcher in 2005, but returned to the Max Planck Institute in 2007, and became group leader there in 2018. She continues to hold an adjunct scientist position at the University of Wisconsin–Milwaukee, and since 2021 has been professor of gravitational wave astronomy at Leibniz University Hannover.

From 1997 to 2018 she was a member of the LIGO Scientific Collaboration.

== Recognition ==
Papa was named a Fellow of the American Physical Society (APS) in 2014, after a nomination from the APS Division of Gravitational Physics, "for numerous key contributions to gravitational-wave astronomy, including devising new data analysis methods for gravitational waves from pulsars and coordinating the worldwide exchange and analysis of data".
