= Bruce Allen (physicist) =

American physicist and director of the Max Planck Institute for Gravitational Physics

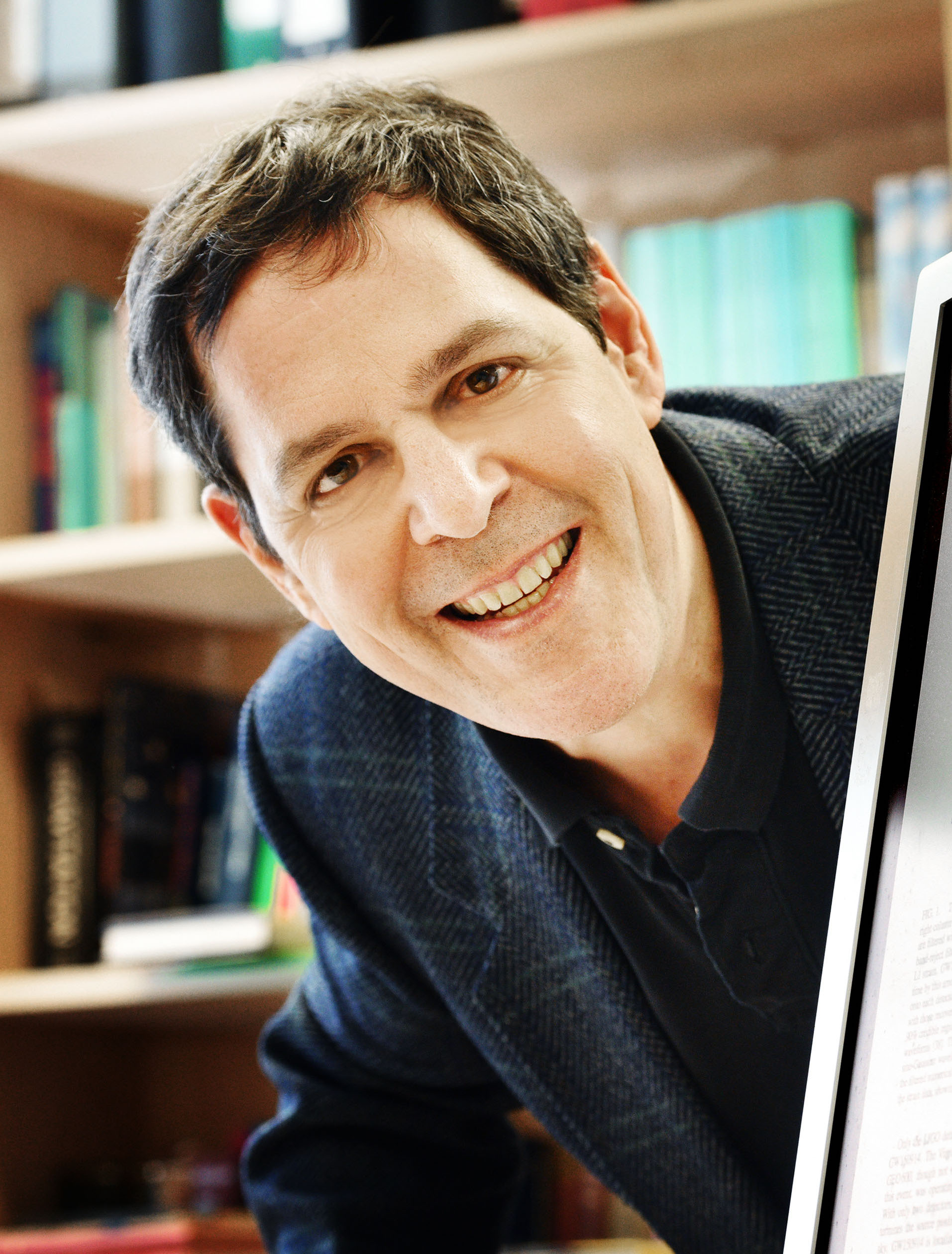
- Bruce Allen in 2016
- Born: May 11, 1959 (age 66)
- Education: Massachusetts Institute of Technology (B.S.); University of Cambridge (PhD)
- Scientific career
- Academic advisors: Stephen Hawking, Rainer Weiss
- Doctoral students: Robert R. Caldwell

Bruce Allen (born May 11, 1959) is an American physicist and director at the Max Planck Institute for Gravitational Physics in Hannover, Germany, and founder and leader of the distributed volunteer computing project Einstein@Home project. He is an honorary physics professor at Leibniz University Hannover, an adjunct physics professor at the University of Wisconsin–Milwaukee, and also the initiator / project leader of smartmontools hard disk utility.

He has done research work on models of the very early universe (inflationary cosmology, cosmic strings), the detection and data analysis of gravitational waves, and has expertise in the development and operation of large computer clusters. Allen currently leads a research group working on the detection of gravitational waves in data from ground-based interferometric detectors and from pulsar timing arrays, and on radio, gamma-ray and gravitational-wave signals from rotating neutron stars. Allen was one of the first scientists to become aware of the initial detection of GW150914 at LIGO, in September 2015. Allen's research work has been supported by the US National Science Foundation between 1987 and 2018.

== Early life and education ==
Allen graduated from Wayland High School, Wayland, Massachusetts, US, in 1976. He obtained his Bachelor of Science in physics in 1980 at the Massachusetts Institute of Technology under the supervision of Rainer Weiss. Allen completed his PhD in physics in 1984 at University of Cambridge with his thesis "Vacuum Energy and General Relativity" under the supervision of Stephen Hawking. From 1983 to 1985 he was a postdoctoral fellow at the University of California, Santa Barbara and from 1985 to 1986 at Tufts University. From 1986 to 1987 he was a chercheur associé (research associate) at Paris Observatory in Meudon.

== Career and research ==
In 1987 Allen became a research assistant professor at Tufts University. He joined the University of Wisconsin–Milwaukee in 1989 as assistant professor of physics, was promoted to associate professor of physics in 1992 and to a full professor of physics in 1997. In 2007 he became a director at the Max Planck Institute for Gravitational Physics (Albert Einstein Institute) in Hanover, Germany and an adjunct professor at the University of Wisconsin–Milwaukee. Since 2008 he is also an honorary professor of physics at Leibniz University Hannover.

Allen has worked on early universe cosmology, inflationary models of the early universe, properties of de Sitter space, and curved-space quantum field theory. He further worked on networks of cosmic strings and the gravitational radiation emitted by them. He made contributions to the detection and data analysis of gravitational waves of different types: from a stochastic background, from inspiraling compact binaries, and continuous, near-sinusoidal signals. Allen was a member of the executive committee of the LIGO Scientific Collaboration from 1997 to 2018. He also worked on designing a runtime system for volunteer computing, and on using the Einstein@Home project to discover new radio and gamma-ray pulsars in data from large radio telescopes and the Fermi Gamma-ray Space Telescope. He has also worked data analysis for pulsar timing arrays. This includes research on the variance of the Hellings-Downs correlation, which is a central measure for the detection of gravitational waves with pulsar timing arrays.

Between 1987 and 2018, Bruce Allen's research has been supported by the US National Science Foundation through 14 grants totaling approximately $10 million.

== Awards ==
- 2020 Richard A. Isaacson Award in Gravitational-Wave Science
- 2017 Bruno Rossi Prize of the American Astronomical Society (as part of the LIGO Scientific Collaboration)
- 2017 Group Achievement Award of the Royal Astronomical Society (as part of the LIGO Scientific Collaboration)
- 2017 Princess of Asturias Award for Scientific and Technical Research (as part of the LIGO Scientific Collaboration)
- 2016 Breakthrough Prize in Fundamental Physics (as part of the LIGO Scientific Collaboration)
- 2016 Gruber Cosmology Prize (as part of the LIGO Scientific Collaboration)
- 2016 Lower Saxony State Prize 2016 (shared with Alessandra Buonanno and Karsten Danzmann)
- 2005 Elected Fellow, American Physical Society
- 2004 Elected Fellow, Institute of Physics (UK)
- 2002–03 Friedrich Wilhelm Bessel Award, Alexander von Humboldt Foundation
- 1997 University of Wisconsin–Milwaukee, Graduate School Research Award
- 1990 First Prize, Gravity Research Foundation
- 1981 Knight Prize, University of Cambridge
- 1980–82 Marshall Scholar, University of Cambridge
- 1980 Phi Beta Kappa, MIT
