= Valeria Ferrari =

Italian physicist

Valeria Ferrari is an Italian physicist whose research concerns the theoretical modeling of gravitational waves, and the oscillations in black holes and neutron stars that could cause them. She is a professor of theoretical physics at Sapienza University of Rome.

== Education and career ==
Ferrari was born on 21 March 1952 in Monterotondo, a municipality within the Metropolital City of Rome. She studied physics at Sapienza University of Rome under the supervision of Giovanni Vittorio Pallottino, earning a degree in 1976 with the thesis On dispersion phenomena in a gravitational wave antenna.

After working as a researcher at Sapienza University from 1977 to 1993, she became an associate professor in 1993, and full professor in 2000. Her doctoral students at Sapienza University have included M. Alessandra Papa in 1997 and Raffaella Schneider in 2000.

== Selected publications ==
=== Research articles ===
- Ferrari, Valeria; Mashhoon, Bahram (July 1984), "New approach to the quasinormal modes of a black hole", Physical Review D, 30 (2): 295–304, Bibcode:1984PhRvD..30..295F, doi:10.1103/physrevd.30.295
- Chandrasekhar, Subrahmanyan; Ferrari, Valeria (February 1991), "On the non-radial oscillations of a star", Proceedings of the Royal Society of London, Series A, 432 (1885): 247–279, Bibcode:1991RSPSA.432..247C, doi:10.1098/rspa.1991.0016, JSTOR 51855, S2CID 122833232
- Schneider, R.; Ferrari, V.; Matarrese, S.; Portegies Zwart, S. F. (July 2001), "Low-frequency gravitational waves from cosmological compact binaries", Monthly Notices of the Royal Astronomical Society, 324 (4): 797–810, arXiv:astro-ph/0002055, Bibcode:2001MNRAS.324..797S, doi:10.1046/j.1365-8711.2001.04217.x, S2CID 17717713
- Benhar, Omar; Ferrari, Valeria; Gualtieri, Leonardo (December 2004), "Gravitational wave asteroseismology reexamined", Physical Review D, 70 (12) 124015, arXiv:astro-ph/0407529, Bibcode:2004PhRvD..70l4015B, doi:10.1103/physrevd.70.124015, S2CID 119418120
- Andersson, N.; Ferrari, V.; Jones, D. I.; Kokkotas, K. D.; Krishnan, B.; Read, J. S.; Rezzolla, L.; Zink, B. (2011), "Gravitational waves from neutron stars: promises and challenges", General Relativity and Gravitation, 43 (2): 409–436, arXiv:0912.0384, Bibcode:2011GReGr..43..409A, doi:10.1007/s10714-010-1059-4, S2CID 119195365

=== Book ===
- Ferrari, Valeria; Gualtieri, Leonardo; Pani, Paolo (2020), General Relativity and its Applications: Black Holes, Compact Stars and Gravitational Waves, CRC Press, Bibcode:2020grab.book.....F, doi:10.1201/9780429491405, ISBN 978-0-429-49140-5, S2CID 224954065
