= PALFA Survey =

Large-scale astronomical survey

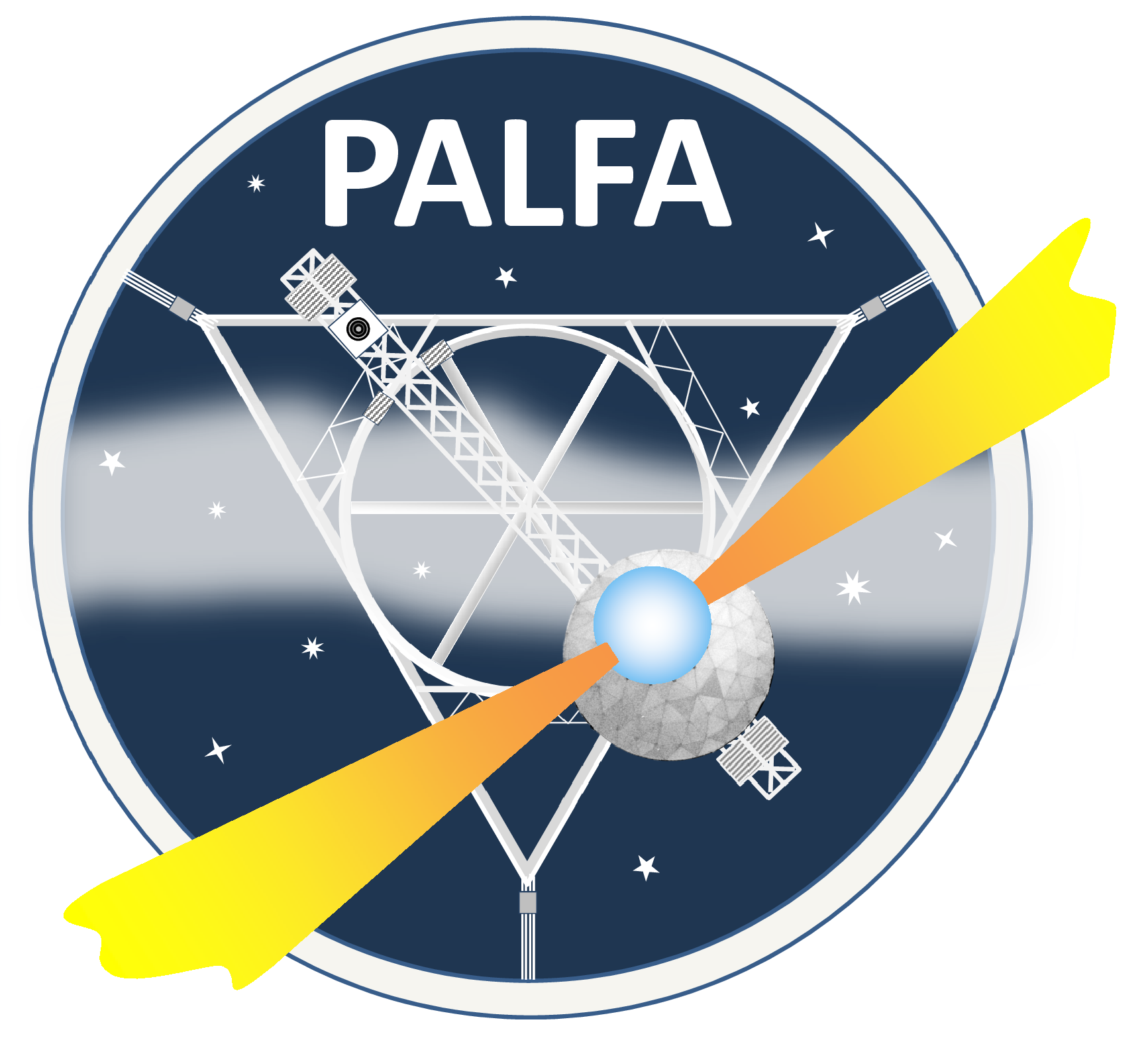
- The PALFA survey logo
- Website: palfa.nanograv.org
- Related media on Commons

PALFA is a large-scale survey for radio pulsars at 1.4 GHz using the Arecibo 305-meter telescope and the ALFA multibeam receivers. It is the largest and most sensitive survey of the Galactic plane to date.

== Introduction ==
Most of the advances in pulsar astronomy were due to the discovery of new objects. A major increase in search sensitivity has already started a new era of discovery at the Arecibo Observatory.

This increase in search sensitivity is due first and foremost by the ALFA receiver and the pulsar surveys it makes possible, which are now being carried by the Pulsar Consortium using the Arecibo 305 m radio telescope. Preliminary estimates (see below) indicate that the Arecibo Galactic plane survey using ALFA could find many hundreds of new pulsars. As of November 2019, the survey had already discovered a total of 192 new pulsars.

The survey is targeting low Galactic latitudes (|b|≤5°) in the Galactic longitude ranges accessible by the Arecibo telescope (32°<l<77°) and 168°<l<214°). Upon completion, it is expected to find hundreds of new pulsars. Highlights from the survey include the discoveries of the second most relativistic binary pulsar known, PSR J1906+0746, and the first eccentric binary millisecond pulsar in the Galactic plane, PSR J1903+0327. In addition, PALFA has produced the first pulsar discovery by volunteer computing, PSR J2007+2722, through the Einstein@Home distributed computing project. The discoveries include all known varieties of rotation-powered neutron stars: millisecond pulsars, relativistic binaries, mildly recycled, normal, and energetic young pulsars. Fourteen of the ALFA objects have been identified through their intermittent single pulses and are likely rotating radio transients (RRATs). The rest have been discovered via blind periodicity searches. Follow-up radio timing observations are carried out through a coordinated effort between Arecibo, Jodrell Bank, Greenbank, and Nançay to obtain phase-connected timing solutions for these pulsars.

The first fast radio burst to be discovered by a telescope other than the Parkes radio telescope was identified in a PALFA pointing in the Galactic anti-center. This was the first repeating fast radio burst ever discovered.

The PALFA survey is carried out by an international consortium of scientists from the United States, Canada, Germany, Netherlands, United Kingdom, Australia, and France. The Principal Investigator of the PALFA survey is Prof. Victoria Kaspi of McGill University.

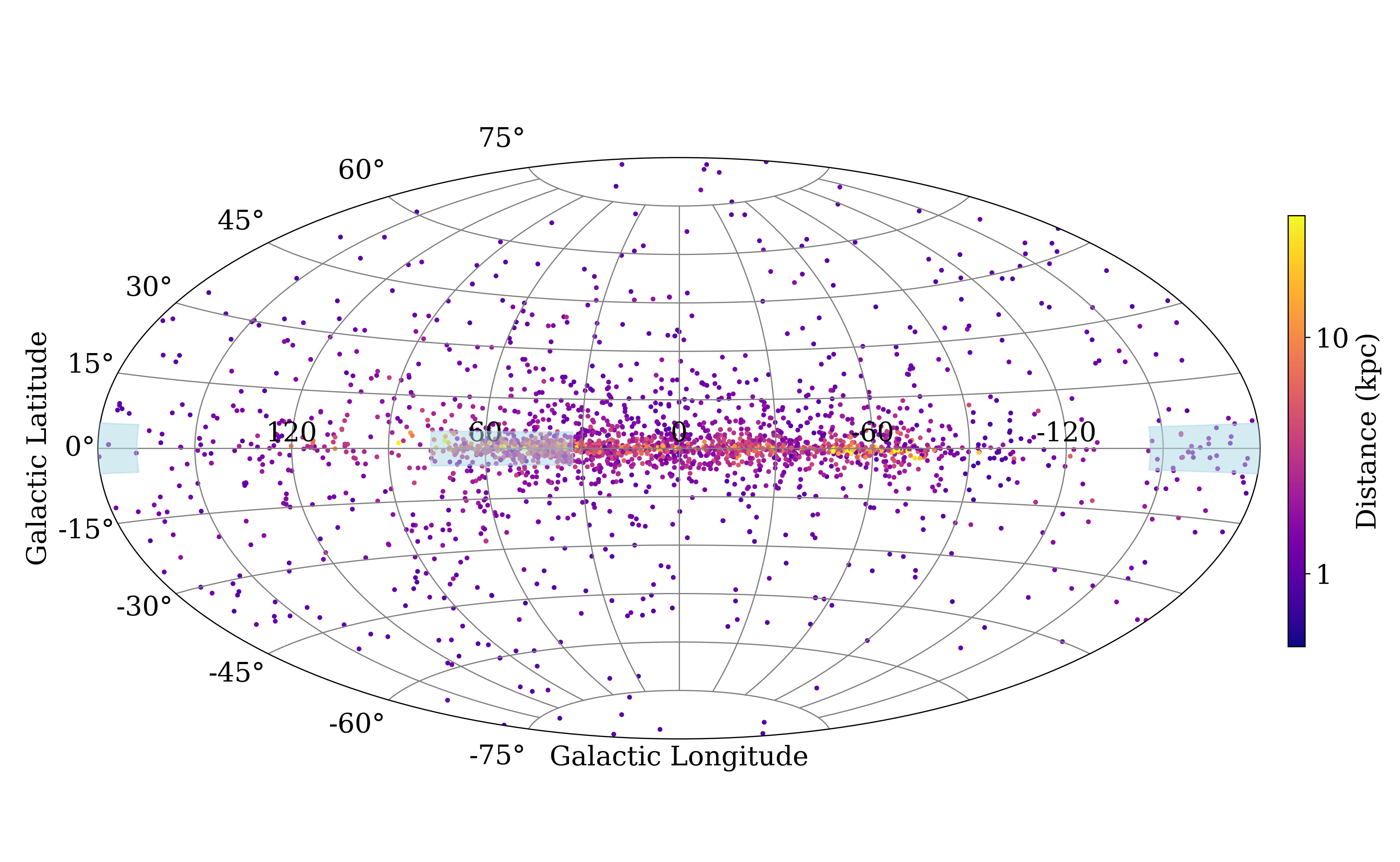
Sky map in Galactic coordinates showing (in green) the portions of the Galactic plane being targeted by the PALFA survey. This region corresponds to most of the Galactic plane visible with the Arecibo telescope. The dots correspond to known pulsars, their color indicates their inferred distance.

== Data acquisition ==
With ALFA, 47 pointings are needed to cover one square degree, compared to about 330 pointings needed to cover one square degree with similar density with a single-pixel feed. Initially, the survey used the Wideband Arecibo Pulsar Processors (WAPPs) to detect the signal from ALFA's seven beams. These cover 100 MHz of band (with dual polarization capability), initially centered at 1420 MHz and now at 1440 MHz. For search purposes, 256-channel spectra are produced every 64 microseconds. In 2009, the survey transitioned to new and improved back-ends, the Mock polyphase filterbank spectrometers, which are capable of covering 300 MHz (from 1225 MHz to 1525 MHz, the bandwidth covered by ALFA) for each of the seven beams (see detailed technical specifications here). This has led to greatly increased search sensitivity and better means to deal with all the radio frequency interference.

== Data processing and storage ==
Many of the detections to date have been made with a quick reduction package that allows us to find pulsars almost in real time. This is made possible by reducing the spectral and time resolution by a factor of 16, and using a computer cluster, the Arecibo Signal Processor, to search for pulsars in the data. This is a quick way of detecting slow pulsars, but the sensitivity to fast pulsars is severely degraded. Re-processing these data with full resolution is a computationally challenging task but is essential for detecting many fast (both young and recycled) pulsars so far hidden by galactic plasma.

It is expected that, over the next several years, this survey will generate over 1000 Terabytes of data. The data is stored at the Cornell University Center for Advanced Computing. The full-resolution raw data is processed independently by three software pipelines.

The Cornell University pipeline has conducted standard periodicity search and single-pulse search without doing an acceleration search. It has been run on all WAPP data archived at the Cornell University Center for Advanced Computing and has provided 2.5 million signal candidates. Winnowing of this vast set of candidates is currently under way.

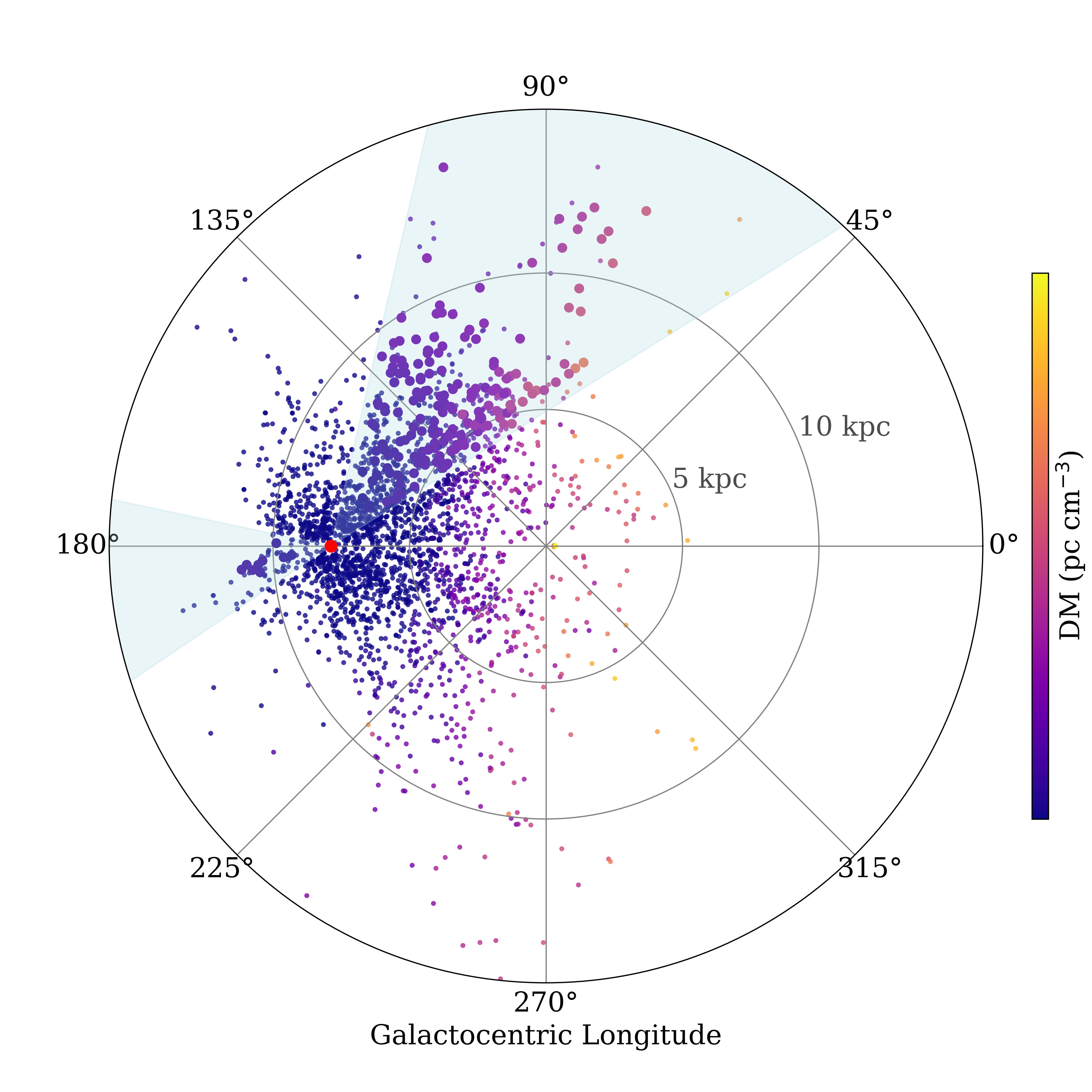
Galactic location of the new P-ALFA pulsar survey discoveries. The center of the Galaxy is indicated by the center of the coordinates, the position of the Solar System is indicated by the red dot on the left. The PALFA search areas are indicated in light blue. The dots indicate pulsars, this time colored according to their DM. The new PALFA discoveries are indicated by the larger dots.

The second pipeline is based on PRESTO, a large suite of pulsar search and analysis software developed by Scott Ransom. It employs a Fourier-domain acceleration search technique, which compensates for the loss of detection sensitivity in a traditional periodicity search due to a rapidly changing frequency of the periodic pulsar signal. Such frequency modulation can occur, for instance, due to a pulsar's orbital motion in a compact binary. This approach thus significantly boosts sensitivity to binary pulsars. The PRESTO pipeline is run on dedicated clusters at several institutions that participate in the ALFA survey, producing over 3 million signal candidates. Over the past two years, the Guillimin supercomputer, managed by McGill University as part of CLUMEQ, has been processing most of the PALFA data with PRESTO.

Since March 2009, part of the Einstein@Home computing power is used to analyze PALFA data. The Einstein@Home algorithm is particularly sensitive to radio pulsars in tight binary systems (as short as 11 minutes), with a phase-space coverage that is complementary to that of the PRESTO pipeline. To date, it has re-detected 123 previously known radio pulsars as well as several previously unknown pulsars.

The data processed thus far has revealed that the radio frequency interference (RFI) environment at Arecibo significantly affects the detection threshold of the survey, creating unforeseen challenges in identifying the many weak pulsars that are likely lurking in the data. To address this, the PALFA consortium is actively developing novel techniques for identification, mitigation, and excision of RFI. We are also implementing a variety of heuristics as well as machine learning algorithms for identifying real pulsars among the millions of signal candidates, most of which appear to be due to RFI. The inevitable growth in the incidence and variety of man-made RFI suggests that this problem will likely be important for all future radio pulsar surveys.

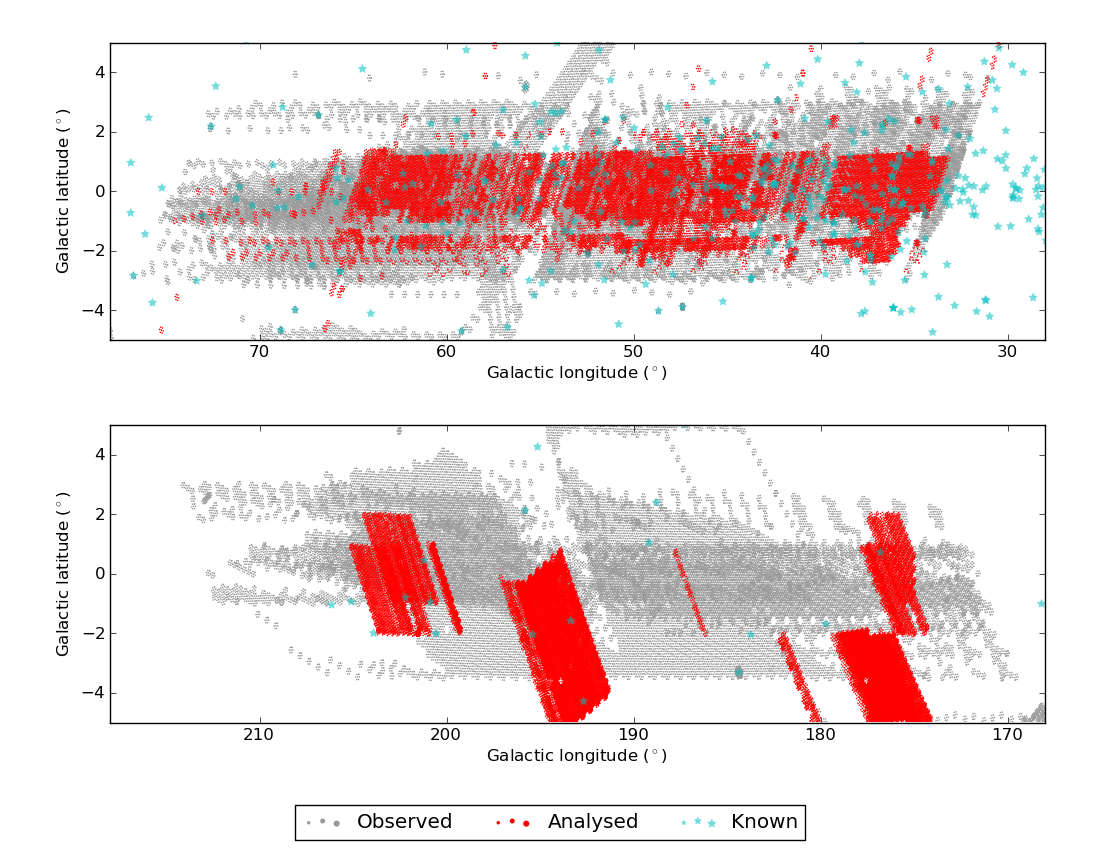
Sky coverage map of the PALFA survey as of July 8, 2014

== Outreach efforts ==
The Arecibo Remote Command Center (ARCC) at the University of Texas at Brownsville, the University of Wisconsin–Milwaukee, and Franklin & Marshall College is currently engaged in searching for radio pulsars in PALFA data. ARCC is an integrated research/education facility that allows students at the high school and undergraduate level to be directly involved with the research at the Arecibo telescope. Web based tools have been developed so that students can rank the pulsar candidates created by the PRESTO analysis.
