= Raffaella Schneider =

Italian astrophysicist

Raffaella Schneider (born 1971) is an Italian astrophysicist whose research concerns the first generations of stars, galaxies, and black holes in the early universe. She is a professor of astrophysics at Sapienza University of Rome.

== Education and career ==
Schneider studied physics at Sapienza University of Rome, earning a laurea there in 1995. She completed her PhD in 2000 with the dissertation Stochastic backgrounds of gravitational waves from cosmological populations of astrophysical sources, co-supervised by Valeria Ferrari and Sabino Matarrese.

After postdoctoral research at the Arcetri Observatory from 2000 to 2002, and at the Enrico Fermi Center for Study and Research in Rome from 2002 to 2005, she returned to Arcetri as a permanent research staff member in 2005. She moved to the Rome Observatory in 2010, became an associate professor at Sapienza University in 2016, and was promoted to full professor in 2019.

== Book ==
Schneider is co-author with Simona Gallerani and four other Italian women astronomers of an Italian astronomy book for children, Apri gli occhi al cielo [Open your eyes to the sky], which was a finalist for the 2020 National Award for Scientific Dissemination.
