= Einstein@Home =

Volunteer computing project

- Einstein@Home screensaver
- Developer(s): Max Planck Society (MPG)
- Initial release: February 19, 2005
- Development status: Active
- Operating system: Cross-platform
- Platform: BOINC
- License: GPL-2.0-or-later
- Average performance: 7659.0 TFLOPS (December 2023)
- Active users: 16,069
- Total users: 1,048,317
- Active hosts: 34,751
- Total hosts: 8,140,803
- Website: einsteinathome.org

Einstein@Home is a volunteer computing project that searches for signals from spinning neutron stars in data from gravitational-wave detectors, from large radio telescopes, and from a gamma-ray telescope. Neutron stars are detected by their pulsed radio and gamma-ray emission as radio and/or gamma-ray pulsars. They also might be observable as continuous gravitational wave sources if they are rapidly spinning and non-axisymmetrically deformed. The project was officially launched on 19 February 2005 as part of the American Physical Society's contribution to the World Year of Physics 2005 event.

Einstein@Home searches data from the LIGO gravitational-wave detectors. The project conducts the most sensitive all-sky searches for continuous gravitational waves. While no such signal has yet been detected, the upper limits set by Einstein@Home analyses provide astrophysical constraints on the galactic population of spinning neutron stars in our Milky Way galaxy.

Einstein@Home also searches radio telescope data from the Arecibo Observatory, and has in the past analyzed data from Parkes Observatory. On 12 August 2010, the first discovery by Einstein@Home of a previously undetected radio pulsar J2007+2722, found in data from the Arecibo Observatory, was published in Science. This was the first data-based discovery by a volunteer computing project. As of December 2023, Einstein@Home had discovered 55 radio pulsars.

The project also analyses data from the Fermi Gamma-ray Space Telescope to discover gamma-ray pulsars. On 26 November 2013, the first Einstein@Home results of the Fermi data analysis was published: the discovery of four young gamma-ray pulsars in data from Fermi's Large Area Telescope (LAT). As of December 2023, Einstein@Home has discovered 39 previously unknown gamma-ray pulsars in data from the Large Area Telescope on board the Fermi Gamma-ray Space Telescope. The Einstein@Home search makes use of novel and more efficient data-analysis methods and discovered pulsars missed in other analyses of the same data.

The project runs on the Berkeley Open Infrastructure for Network Computing (BOINC) software platform and uses free software released under the GNU General Public License, version 2. Einstein@Home is hosted by the Max Planck Institute for Gravitational Physics (Albert Einstein Institute, Hannover, Germany) and the University of Wisconsin–Milwaukee. The project is supported by the Max Planck Society (MPG), the American Physical Society (APS), and the US National Science Foundation (NSF). The Einstein@Home project director is Bruce Allen.

Einstein@Home uses the power of volunteer computing in solving the computationally intensive problem of analyzing a large volume of data. Such an approach was pioneered by the SETI@home project, which is designed to look for signs of extraterrestrial life by analyzing radio wave data. Einstein@Home runs through the same software platform as SETI@home, the Berkeley Open Infrastructure for Network Computing (BOINC). As of December 2023, more than 492,000 volunteers in 226 countries had participated in the project, making it the third-most-popular active BOINC application. Users regularly contribute about 7.7 petaFLOPS of computational power, which would rank Einstein@Home among the top 105 on the TOP500 list of supercomputers.

== Scientific objectives ==
The Einstein@Home project was originally created to perform all-sky searches for previously unknown continuous gravitational-wave (CW) sources using data from the Laser Interferometer Gravitational-Wave Observatory (LIGO) detector instruments in Washington and Louisiana, USA. The best understood potential CW sources are rapidly spinning neutron stars (including pulsars) which are expected to emit gravitational waves due to a deviation from Rotational symmetry. Besides validating Einstein's theory of General Relativity, direct detection of gravitational waves would also constitute an important new astronomical tool. As most neutron stars are electromagnetically invisible, gravitational-wave observations might also reveal completely new populations of neutron stars. A CW detection could potentially be extremely helpful in neutron-star astrophysics and would eventually provide unique insights into the nature of matter at high densities, because it provides a way of examining the bulk motion of the matter.

Since March 2009, part of the Einstein@Home computing power has also been used to analyze data taken by the PALFA Consortium at the Arecibo Observatory in Puerto Rico. This search effort is designed to find radio pulsars in tight binary systems. It is expected that there is one radio pulsar detectable from Earth in an orbital system with a period of less than one hour. A similar search has also been performed on two archival data sets from the Parkes Multi-beam Pulsar Survey. The Einstein@Home radio pulsar search employs mathematical methods developed for the search for gravitational waves.

Since July 2011, Einstein@Home is also analyzing data from the Large Area Telescope (LAT), the primary instrument on Fermi Gamma-ray Space Telescope to search for pulsed gamma-ray emission from spinning neutron stars (gamma-ray pulsars). Some neutron stars are only detectable by their pulsed gamma-ray emission, which originates in a different area of the neutron star magnetosphere than the radio emission. Identifying the neutron star's rotation rate is computationally difficult, because for a typical gamma-ray pulsar only thousands of gamma-ray photons will be detected by the LAT over the course of billions of rotations. The Einstein@Home analysis of the LAT data makes use of methods initially developed for the detection of continuous gravitational waves.

== Gravitational-wave data analysis and results ==
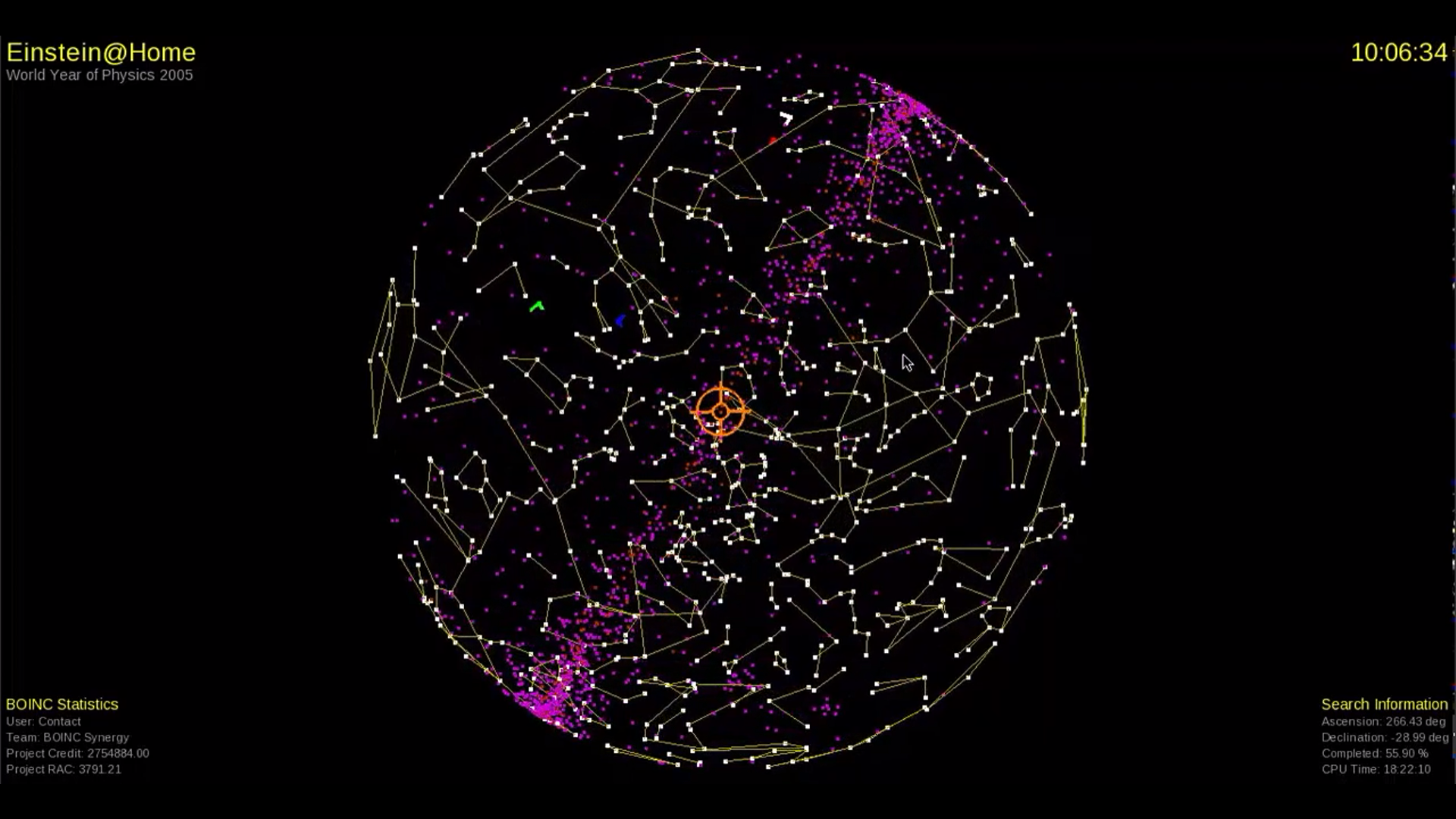
Einstein@Home screensaver

Einstein@Home has carried out many analysis runs using data from the LIGO instruments. Since its first search run in 2005, the sensitivity of the LIGO detectors has been improved in a series of steps and upgrades. This is continuing with the current Advanced LIGO detectors. At the same time, Einstein@Home search algorithms have also improved. Together these have increased the search sensitivity by several orders of magnitude.

Einstein@Home's first analysis used data from the "third science run" (S3) of LIGO. Processing of the S3 data set was conducted between 22 February 2005 and 2 August 2005. This analysis employed 60 segments from the LIGO Hanford 4-km detector, totaling ten hours of data each. Each 10-hour segment was analyzed for CW signals by the volunteers' computers using a matched-filtering technique. When all matched-filtering results were returned, the results from different segments were then combined in a "post-processing step" on Einstein@Home servers via a coincidence scheme to further enhance search sensitivity. Results were published on the Einstein@Home webpages.

Work on the S4 data set (LIGO's fourth science run) was started via interlacing with the S3 calculations and finished in July 2006. This analysis used 10 segments of 30 hours each from the LIGO Hanford 4-km detector and 7 segments of 30 hours each from the LIGO Livingston 4-km detector. Besides the S4 data being more sensitive, a more sensitive coincidence combination scheme was also applied in the post-processing. The results of this search have led to the first scientific publication of Einstein@Home in Physical Review D.

Einstein@Home gained considerable attention in the international volunteer computing community when an optimized application for the S4 data set analysis was developed and released in March 2006 by project volunteer Akos Fekete, a Hungarian programmer. Fekete improved the official S4 application and introduced SSE, 3DNow! and SSE3 optimizations into the code improving performance by up to 800%. Fekete was recognized for his efforts and was afterward officially involved with the Einstein@Home team in the development of the new S5 application. As of late July 2006, this new official application had become widely distributed among Einstein@Home users. The app created a large surge in the project's total performance and productivity, as measured by floating point speed (or FLOPS), which over time has increased by approximately 50% compared to non-optimized S4 applications.

The first Einstein@Home analysis of the early LIGO S5 data set, where the instruments initially reached their design sensitivity, began on 15 June 2006. This search used 22 segments of 30 hours each from the LIGO Hanford 4-km detector and six segments of 30 hours from the LIGO Livingston 4-km detector. This analysis run (code name "S5R1"), employing the search methodology as Einstein@Home, was very similar to the previous S4 analysis. However, the search results were more sensitive due to the use of more data of better quality compared to S4. Over large parts of the search parameter space, these results, which also appeared in Physical Review D, are the most exhaustive published to date.

The second Einstein@Home search of LIGO S5 data (code name "S5R3") constituted a further major improvement regarding search sensitivity. As opposed to previous searches, the ensuing results were already combined on the volunteers' computers via a Hough transform technique. This method matched-filtered results from 84 data segments of 25 hours each, parameters from which came from both 4-km LIGO Hanford and Livingston instruments.

On 7 May 2010, a new Einstein@Home search (code name "S5GC1"), which uses a significantly improved search method, launched. This program analyzed 205 data segments of 25 hours each, using data from both 4-km LIGO Hanford and Livingston instruments. It employed a technique which exploited global parameter-space correlations to efficiently combine the matched-filtering results from the different segments.

Results from an Einstein@Home all-sky search for continuous gravitational waves in LIGO S5 data were published on 13 February 2013. In the most sensitive frequency band of the search (a half-Hertz band at 152.5 Hertz), the presence of periodic gravitational waves with strain amplitude larger than 7.6×10^{−25} could be excluded at 90% confidence. Overall, the search was 3 times as sensitive as previous Einstein@Home searches in LIGO S5 data. Details of the two-stage follow-up procedure for signal candidates used in this study were published on 25 June 2014.

A search for high-frequency (1249 Hertz to 1499 Hertz) continuous gravitational waves in LIGO S5 data by Einstein@Home, published on 26 September 2016, was the only such search in LIGO data. No signal candidates were identified. The search excluded neutron stars with spin frequencies between 625 Hertz and 770 Hertz and with ellipticities greater than 2.8×10^{−7} closer than 100 parsec to Earth.

Data from LIGO 6th science run (S6) were analyzed by Einstein@Home and the results were published on 18 November 2016. No signal was found and the search set the most stringent upper limits for an all-sky search for continuous gravitational waves at the time of publication. In the most sensitive frequency band between 170.5 Hertz and 171 Hertz there were (with 90% confidence) no continuous gravitational waves with a strain amplitude of more than 5.5×10^{−25} detected. At frequencies of 230 Hertz, the search results exclude neutron stars with ellipticities greater than 10^{−6} within 100 parsecs of Earth.

Einstein@Home conducted a directed search for continuous gravitational waves from the central object in the supernova remnant Cassiopeia A. It used data from the LIGO S6 run and searched over a range of frequencies from 50 Hertz to 1000 Hertz, because the spin frequency of the central object is unknown. No signal was found. The upper limits on gravitational-wave emission from Cassiopeia A were the most stringent at the time of publication, about a factor two lower than previous upper limits.

On 28 December 2016 results from a follow-up of the all-sky search for continuous gravitational waves in LIGO S6 data were published. Out of a total of 3.8 × 10^{10} signal candidates from the earlier search, the 16 million most promising were analyzed using a four-stage hierarchical process. No candidate was found to be consistent with an astrophysical source of continuous gravitational waves. In the frequency band between 170.5 Hertz and 171 Hertz the upper limit (90% confidence) on the strain amplitude was 4.3×10^{−25}, a factor 1.3 lower than in the previous search.

Searches for continuous gravitational waves are limited by the available computing power. Within the project, research on improving the sensitivity of the searches with new methods is conducted. In late 2017 two publications were published, describing improved methods of candidate clustering in the hierarchical searches and new "veto" methods that distinguish between astrophysical continuous gravitational waves and detector artifacts mimicking them.

Both these new methods were employed in the first Einstein@Home all-sky search for continuous gravitational waves in Advanced LIGO data from the first observing run (O1), the results of which were published on 8 December 2017. The first part of the search investigated the lower end of the LIGO frequency band between 20 Hertz and 100 Hertz. No signals were found. The most stringent upper limit (90% confidence) on the gravitational-wave strain amplitude set by the search was 1.8×10^{−25} at a frequency of 100 Hertz.

An Einstein@Home study on how to optimally use the limited computing power for directed searches (where prior information on the target object such as the sky position is available) was published on 31 January 2018. It describes the design of searches for continuous gravitational waves over a wide frequency range from three supernova remnants (Vela Jr, Cassiopeia A, and G347.3).

The results from the directed Einstein@Home search for continuous gravitational waves from the central objects of the supernova remnants Vela Jr., Cassiopeia A, and G347.3 was published on 29 July 2019. It covered a frequency range from 20 Hertz to 1500 Hertz and used data from LIGO's first observing run O1. No signal was found and the most stringent upper limit at the time of publication were set, improving earlier results by a factor of two for all three targets.

A follow-up of the Einstein@Home search for continuous gravitational waves from the central objects of the supernova remnants Vela Jr., Cassiopeia A, and G347.3 was published on 29 June 2020. It investigated the most promising 10,000 candidates from the previous search and followed them up in two stretches of data from LIGO's second observing run (O2). A single candidate associated with G347.3 remained as a possible signal after the follow-up, but was not conclusively confirmed based on gravitational-wave data. Archival X-ray data were searched for pulsations at the putative rotation frequency of the neutron star and its integer multiples. No signal was found. It is expected that data from LIGO's third observing run (O3) will suffice to shed light on the nature of this potential candidate.

On 8 March 2021 results from an Einstein@Home all-sky search for continuous gravitational waves in LIGO O2 data were published. It used an eight-stage follow-up process and covered a frequency range from 20 Hertz to 585 Hertz and reached the highest sensitivity for any all-sky survey below 500 Hertz. Six candidates were found after all follow-up stages. They are consistent with and caused by validation hardware injections in the LIGO instruments. No other signal was found. The most stringent upper limit (90% confidence) was set in a 0.5 Hertz band at 163 Hertz at a gravitational-wave strain amplitude of 1.3×10^{−25}. The results begin to probe neutron star astrophysics and population properties. They exclude neutron stars with rotation frequencies above 200 Hertz with ellipticities larger than 10^{−7} (which are predicted by some models of neutron star crusts) closer than 100 parsec.

Results from a dedicated Einstein@Home search for continuous gravitational waves from the central object of the supernova remnant G347.3 was published on 5 August 2021. In the analysed frequency range between 20 Hertz and 400 Hertz no signal was found. The derived upper limits correspond to ellipticities of less than 10^{−6} for most of the frequency band. In the most sensitive frequency band at 166 Hertz the upper limit (90% confidence) on gravitational-wave strain is 7.0×10^{−26}.

In July 2023, the results of an all-sky search for continuous gravitational waves in the public LIGO O3 data were published. The search was the most sensitive at that time for gravitational waves with frequencies between 20 Hertz and 800 Hertz and with spin-downs of up to −2.6×10^{−9} Hz s^{−1}. No astrophysical gravitational-wave signal was identified, and all candidate signals could be attributed to artificial signals injected into the LIGO data for validation purposes. The results exclude the existence of isolated neutron stars spinning at rotational frequencies of more than 200 Hertz with ellipticities larger than 5×10^{−8} closer than 100 parsec.

== Radio data analysis and results ==
On 24 March 2009, it was announced that the Einstein@Home project was beginning to analyze data received by the PALFA Consortium at the Arecibo Observatory in Puerto Rico.

On 26 November 2009, a CUDA-optimized application for the Arecibo Binary Pulsar Search was first detailed on official Einstein@Home webpages. This application uses both a regular CPU and an NVIDIA GPU to perform analyses faster (in some cases up to 50% faster).

On 12 August 2010, the Einstein@Home project announced the discovery of a new disrupted binary pulsar, PSR J2007+2722; it may be the fastest-spinning such pulsar discovered to date. The computers of Einstein@Home volunteers Chris and Helen Colvin and Daniel Gebhardt observed PSR 2007+2722 with the highest statistical significance.

On 1 March 2011, the Einstein@Home project announced their second discovery: a binary pulsar system PSR J1952+2630. The computers of Einstein@Home volunteers from Russia and the UK observed PSR J1952+2630 with the highest statistical significance.

By 15 May 2012 a new application for ATI/AMD graphic cards had been released. Using OpenCL, the new application was ten times faster than running on a typical CPU.

On 22 July 2013, an Android application version of the radio pulsar search was announced. Like the CPU application, the Android application processes data from Arecibo Observatory.

On 20 August 2013, the discovery of 24 pulsars in data from the Parks Multi-beam Pulsar Survey was published. The re-analysis of the data found these pulsars, which were missed by previous analyses and re-analyses of the data. Six of the discovered pulsars are in binary systems.

The discovery of a double neutron star binary in PALFA data by the project was published on 4 November 2016. PSR J1913+1102 is in a 4.95 hour orbit with a neutron star partner. By measuring the relativistic periastron advance, the total mass of the system was determined to 2.88 solar masses, similar to the mass of the most massive double neutron star, B1913+16.

Timing analysis of 13 radio pulsars discovered by Einstein@Home were published by the PALFA Consortium in August 2021.

On 31 October 2023 the project announced the launch of a new Zooniverse project called "Pulsar Seekers". In this project, citizen scientists visually inspect and classify sets of diagnostic plots for pulsar candidates produced from the Einstein@Home analysis of observations from the large Arecibo telescope's PALFA pulsar survey. The goal is to identify new pulsars in these data.

As of December 2023, the Einstein@Home project had discovered a total of 55 radio pulsars: 24 using Parkes Multibeam Survey data and 31 using Arecibo radio data (including two from the Arecibo Binary Radio Pulsar Search and 29 using data from the PALFA Mock spectrometer data from Arecibo Observatory).

== Gamma-ray data analysis and results ==
On 1 July 2011 the project announced a new application to search for pulsars in data from the Large Area Telescope on board the Fermi Gamma-ray Space Telescope.

On 26 November 2013, the discovery of four young gamma-ray pulsars in LAT data by the Einstein@Home project was published. All four pulsars are located in the plane of our Galaxy and have spin frequencies of less than 10 Hertz and characteristic ages between 35,000 and 56,000 years. No radio waves were detected from any of the pulsars.

The discovery of the gamma-ray pulsar PSR J1906+0722 was published on 4 August 2015. The discovery confirmed the pulsar nature of the object which had been suspected since 2012 based on the energy distribution of the gamma-ray photons observed by the LAT. The pulsar is young and energetic. In August 2009 it suffered one of the largest glitches observed from a gamma-ray pulsar. No radio pulsations were detected in any follow-up search, making PSR J1906+0722 likely radio-quiet. Advanced methods of timing the arrival times of gamma-ray pulsations were introduced to improve the parameter inference of astrophysical properties.

On 16 November 2016 the discovery and timing measurements of PSR J1208−6238, the youngest known radio-quiet gamma-ray pulsar, were published. Even though the inferred age is 2,700 years, no associated supernova remnant or pulsar wind nebula could be identified.

On 11 January 2017, the first results from a survey of 118 unidentified pulsar-like sources from the Fermi-LAT Catalog were published. A total of 13 new pulsars were found. Most of them are young and were formed in supernovae several tens to hundreds of thousands of years ago. The discoveries and the methods used in the survey were published in the first of two associated papers. The second paper reports faint radio pulsations from two of the 13 gamma-ray pulsars, and presents modeling of the gamma-ray and radio pulse profiles with different geometric emission models.

The discovery of two millisecond pulsars discovered by Einstein@Home through their pulsed gamma radiation was published on 28 February 2018. PSR J1035−6720, spinning at 348 Hertz, has detectable radio pulsations which were found in follow-up searches. The other discovery PSR J1744−7619 is the first radio-quiet millisecond pulsar ever discovered. The project also announced that it was searching for gamma-ray pulsars in binary systems, which are more difficult to find due to the additional orbital parameters.

The first Einstein@Home discovery of a gamma-ray pulsar in a binary system was published on 22 October 2020. PSR J1653-0158, a neutron star with about two solar masses and one of the highest known rotation frequencies of 508 Hertz, orbits the common center of mass with a companion of only 1% of the Sun's mass. The orbital period is 75 minutes, shorter than that of any comparable binary systems. The discovery was made using a GPU-accelerated version of a modified gamma-ray pulsar search code, which included binary orbital parameters. No radio waves were found in follow-up searches. A search for gravitational waves from the pulsar discovered no such emission. The pulsar is from a class known as black widow pulsars. The pulsar evaporates its companion with its energetic radiation and a particle wind. The ablated material fills the binary system with a cloud of plasma absorbing radio waves, but not gamma radiation.

A second discovery of a gamma-ray pulsar in an unusual binary system was reported on 2 February 2021. It was thought to be a "redback" millisecond pulsar system, but no pulsations from the neutron star had been observed. Optical observations of the pulsar companion were used to constrain the orbital parameters of the system. A thus targeted search for gamma-ray pulsations with Einstein@Home found a low-mass pulsar spinning at 377 Hertz in a 5.5 hour orbit with a companion of about a fifth of a solar mass. Precision timing of the gamma-ray pulsations revealed unpredictable changes in the orbital period of up to ten milliseconds. They might be linked to changes in the mass distribution of the companion caused by its magnetic activity, which in turn would affect the pulsar orbit through the changing external gravitational field.

The discovery of 14 previously unknown gamma-ray pulsars in Fermi-LAT data was announced by the project on 15 June 2021.

In November 2023 the Third Fermi Large Area Telescope Catalog of Gamma-Ray Pulsars was published. The catalog lists 39 pulsars discovered with Einstein@Home and 14 with Einstein@Home methods implemented on a large compute cluster. The catalog also includes 13 candidate spider pulsar systems, that could be targets for future searches for their gamma-ray pulsations with Einstein@Home.

As of December 2023, the Einstein@Home project had discovered a total of 39 gamma-ray pulsars in Fermi LAT data.

== See also ==
- Gravitational wave
- Laser Interferometer Gravitational-Wave Observatory (LIGO)
- List of volunteer computing projects

== Scientific Publications ==
- Clark, C. J.; et al. (2016). "The Braking Index of a Radio-quiet Gamma-ray Pulsar". The Astrophysical Journal. 832 (1): L15. arXiv:1611.01292. Bibcode:2016ApJ...832L..15C. doi:10.3847/2041-8205/832/1/L15. ISSN 2041-8213. S2CID 54531854.
- Clark, Colin J.; et al. (2016). "The Einstein@Home Gamma-ray Pulsar Survey I: Search Methods, Sensitivity and Discovery of New Young Gamma-ray Pulsars". The Astrophysical Journal. 834 (2): 106. arXiv:1611.01015. Bibcode:2017ApJ...834..106C. doi:10.3847/1538-4357/834/2/106. S2CID 5750104.
- Lyne, A. G.; Stappers, B. W.; Bogdanov, S.; Freire, P. C. C.; Kaspi, V. M.; et al. (2016). "Timing of 29 Pulsars Discovered in the PALFA Survey". The Astrophysical Journal. 834 (2): 137. arXiv:1608.09007. Bibcode:2017ApJ...834..137L. doi:10.3847/1538-4357/834/2/137. S2CID 53639204.
- Papa, M. A.; Eggenstein, H.-B.; Walsh, S.; Di Palma, I.; Allen, B.; et al. (2016). "Hierarchical follow-up of sub-threshold candidates of an all-sky Einstein@Home search for continuous gravitational waves on LIGO sixth science run data". Physical Review D. 94 (12) 122006. arXiv:1608.08928. Bibcode:2016PhRvD..94l2006P. doi:10.1103/PhysRevD.94.122006. S2CID 4595158.
- Lazarus, P.; et al. (2016). "Einstein@Home discovery of a Double-Neutron Star Binary in the PALFA Survey". The Astrophysical Journal. 831 (2): 150. arXiv:1608.08211. Bibcode:2016ApJ...831..150L. doi:10.3847/0004-637X/831/2/150. ISSN 1538-4357. S2CID 20833657.
- Zhu, Sylvia J.; et al. (2016). "Einstein@Home search for continuous gravitational waves from Cassiopeia A". Physical Review D. 94 (8) 082008. arXiv:1608.07589. Bibcode:2016PhRvD..94h2008Z. doi:10.1103/PhysRevD.94.082008. ISSN 2470-0010. S2CID 118479596.
- Singh, Avneet; et al. (2016). "Results of an all-sky high-frequency Einstein@Home search for continuous gravitational waves in LIGO's fifth science run". Physical Review D. 94 (6) 064061. arXiv:1607.00745. Bibcode:2016PhRvD..94f4061S. doi:10.1103/PhysRevD.94.064061. ISSN 2470-0010. S2CID 119229506.
- The LIGO Scientific Collaboration; The Virgo Collaboration (2016). "Results of the deepest all-sky survey for continuous gravitational waves on LIGO S6 data running on the Einstein@Home volunteer distributed computing project". Physical Review D. 94 (10) 102002. arXiv:1606.09619. Bibcode:2016PhRvD..94j2002A. doi:10.1103/PhysRevD.94.102002. S2CID 118385297.
- Clark, C. J.; et al. (2015). "PSR J1906+0722: An elusive gamma-ray pulsar". The Astrophysical Journal. 809 (1): L2. arXiv:1508.00779. Bibcode:2015ApJ...809L...2C. doi:10.1088/2041-8205/809/1/L2. ISSN 2041-8213. S2CID 51946861.
- Knispel, B.; et al. (2015). "Einstein@Home Discovery of a PALFA Millisecond Pulsar in an Eccentric Binary Orbit". The Astrophysical Journal. 806 (1): 140. arXiv:1504.03684. Bibcode:2015ApJ...806..140K. doi:10.1088/0004-637X/806/1/140. ISSN 1538-4357. S2CID 53510852.
- Pletsch, H. J.; et al. (2013). "Einstein@Home discovery of four young gamma-ray pulsars in Fermi LAT data". The Astrophysical Journal. 779 (1): L11. arXiv:1311.6427. Bibcode:2013ApJ...779L..11P. doi:10.1088/2041-8205/779/1/L11. ISSN 2041-8205. S2CID 53588282.
- Knispel, B.; et al. (2013). "Einstein@Home Discovery of 24 Pulsars in the Parkes Multi-beam Pulsar Survey". The Astrophysical Journal. 774 (2): 93. arXiv:1302.0467. Bibcode:2013ApJ...774...93K. doi:10.1088/0004-637X/774/2/93. ISSN 0004-637X. S2CID 118539374.
- Allen, B.; et al. (2013). "The Einstein@Home search for radio pulsars and PSR J2007+2722 discovery". The Astrophysical Journal. 773 (2): 91. arXiv:1303.0028. Bibcode:2013ApJ...773...91A. doi:10.1088/0004-637X/773/2/91. ISSN 0004-637X. S2CID 119253579.
- Knispel, B.; et al. (2011). "Arecibo PALFA Survey and Einstein@Home: Binary Pulsar Discovery by Volunteer Computing". The Astrophysical Journal. 732 (1): L1. arXiv:1102.5340. Bibcode:2011ApJ...732L...1K. doi:10.1088/2041-8205/732/1/L1. ISSN 2041-8205. S2CID 30392929.
- Knispel, B.; et al. (2010). "Pulsar Discovery by Global Volunteer Computing". Science. 329 (5997): 1305. arXiv:1008.2172. Bibcode:2010Sci...329.1305K. doi:10.1126/science.1195253. ISSN 0036-8075. PMID 20705813. S2CID 29786670.
- Pletsch, Holger J.; Allen, Bruce (2009). "Exploiting Large-Scale Correlations to Detect Continuous Gravitational Waves". Physical Review Letters. 103 (18) 181102. arXiv:0906.0023. Bibcode:2009PhRvL.103r1102P. doi:10.1103/PhysRevLett.103.181102. ISSN 0031-9007. PMID 19905796. S2CID 40560957.
- Abbott, B. P.; et al. (2009). "Einstein@Home search for periodic gravitational waves in early S5 LIGO data". Physical Review D. 80 (4) 042003. arXiv:0905.1705. Bibcode:2009PhRvD..80d2003A. doi:10.1103/PhysRevD.80.042003. ISSN 1550-7998. S2CID 13364107.
- Abbott, B.; et al. (2009). "Einstein@Home search for periodic gravitational waves in LIGO S4 data". Physical Review D. 79 (2) 022001. arXiv:0804.1747. Bibcode:2009PhRvD..79b2001A. doi:10.1103/PhysRevD.79.022001. ISSN 1550-7998. S2CID 16542573.
- LIGO Scientific Collaboration. "Final report on the S3 analysis". Archived from the original on 2011-11-21.
- LIGO Scientific Collaboration. "First report on the S3 analysis". Archived from the original on 2011-12-21.
