= Cosmic Explorer (gravitational wave observatory) =

Proposed ground-based gravitational wave observatory

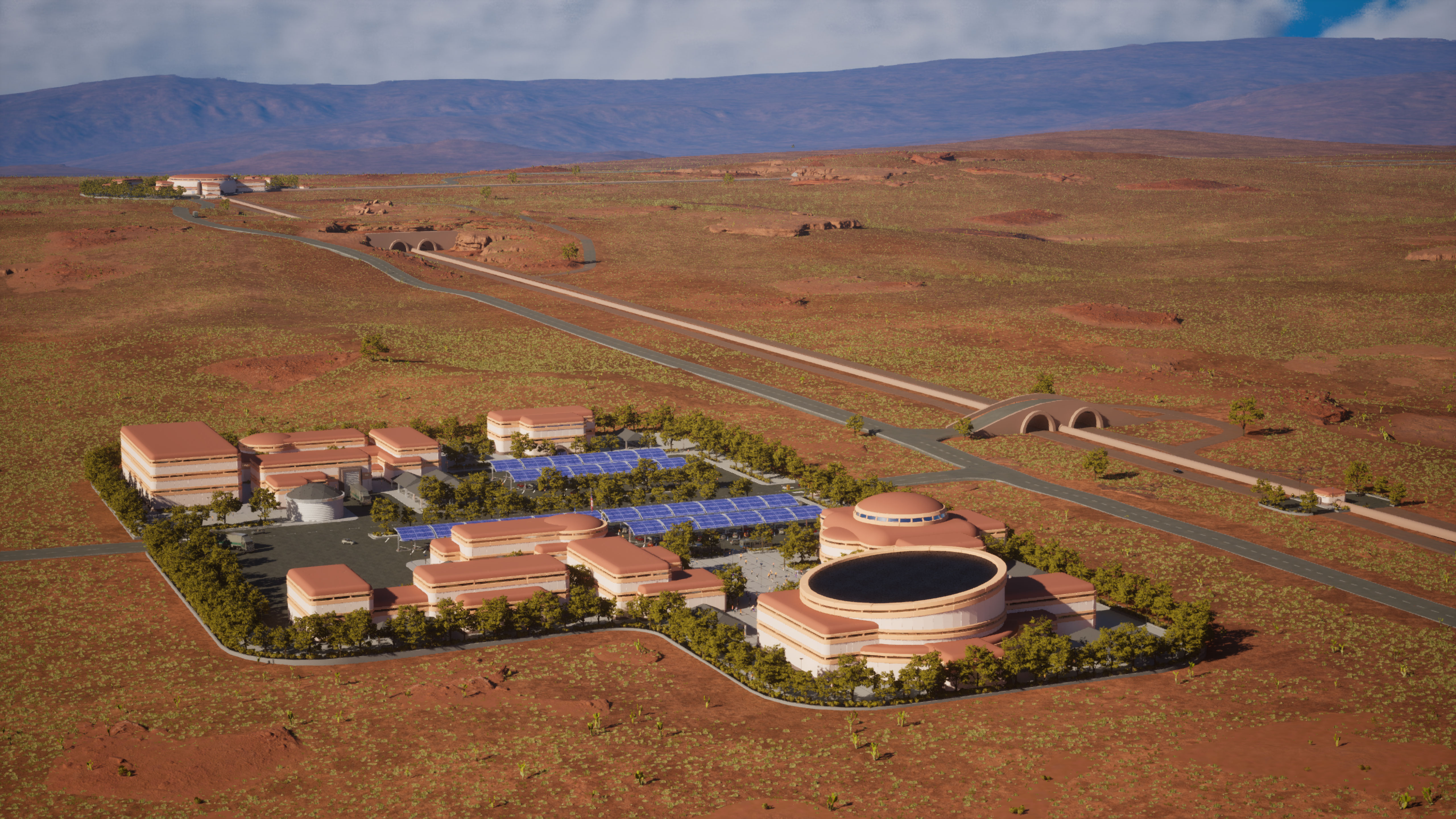
- Location(s): United States
- Length: 40 km (131,233 ft 7 in)
- Website: cosmicexplorer.org
- Related media on Commons

Cosmic Explorer (CE) is a proposed next-generation ground-based gravitational wave observatory. It will consist of two L-shaped interferometers, similar to the LIGO detectors, but with significantly increased arm length (40 km and 20 km) that aims to increase the sensitivity of CE by more than an order of magnitude with respect to the 4-km long LIGO. It is planned to complement its proposed European counterpart, Einstein Telescope (ET), with a similar timeline.

In 2019, the CE consortium published a white paper paper laying out the necessary R&D. A horizon study was released in 2021 outlining the key science objectives, possible network configurations, and timeline. In 2024, a subcommittee of the National Science Foundation recommended for CE to be adopted by the NSF. The network is planned to be operational by the mid-2030s to 2040s.

== Science objectives ==
The science case for CE lies in its order-of-magnitude increase in sensitivity, yielding observations of compact binary coalescences with far greater precision, depth, and survey size. In particular, CE will be able to observe binary black hole (BBH) mergers up to z~20, probing the entire cosmic history of stellar-origin black holes. The number of detected events per year is expected to be of order 10^{5}, the majority of which will be detectable by CE; this is compared to the order ~10^{2} BBHs detected so far with LIGO since 2015 and the ~ 60 known black holes from X-ray binaries. In addition to stellar population studies, the high signal-to-noise (SNR) of events will allow for tests of fundamental physics in the strong-gravity regime, including tests of general relativity and constraints on the properties of dark matter and neutron star matter, as well as the first observations of the gravitational lensing of gravitational waves. Multi-messenger observations from binary neutron star mergers observed as kilonovae will be able to constrain cosmological parameters such as the Hubble constant to within 1% precision in less than a year of observations. Furthermore, CE is expected to observe gravitational waves from new source classes. These include known transient events, such as supernovae, but also could include more exotic phenomena such as cosmic strings or a new class of transients altogether.

The science objectives of CE are aligned with that of Einstein Telescope (ET). Science projections are often conducted with the scenario of a ET-CE network in different configurations. In addition to increased sensitivity, a global network is crucial for localizing events in the sky to high precision, which can be done by triangulating with the arrival time of the gravitational wave.

== See also ==
- Einstein Telescope
