= GRB 190114C =

Notable high energy gamma ray burst explosion

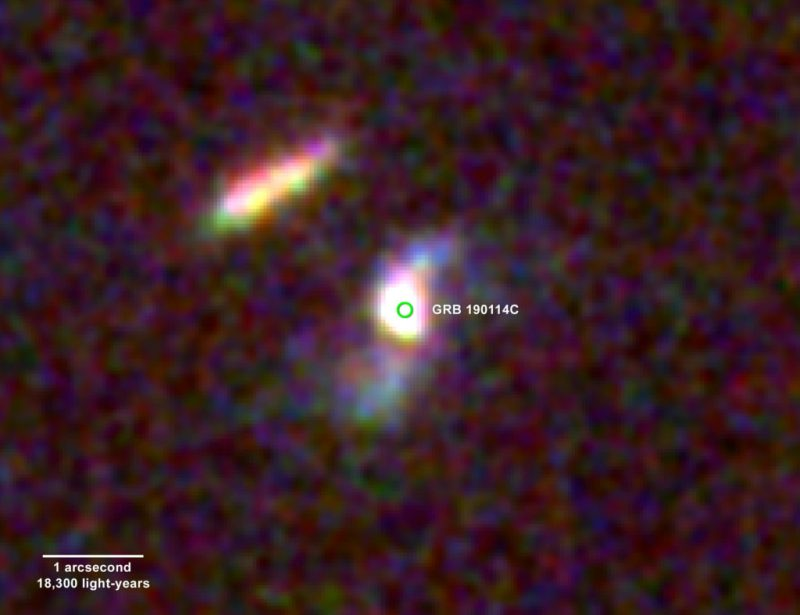
- The Hubble Space Telescope caught the fading afterglow of GRB 190114C and its home galaxy on February 11 and March 12, 2019. The difference between these images reveals a faint, short-lived glow (center of the green circle) located about 800 light-years from the galaxy’s core. Blue colors beyond the core signal the presence of hot, young stars, indicating that this is a spiral galaxy somewhat similar to our own. The source of the burst is located about 4.5 billion light-years away in the direction of the constellation Fornax.
- Event type: Gamma-ray burst
- Constellation: Fornax
- Right ascension: 03^{h} 38^{m} 1.63^{s}
- Declination: −26° 56′ 48.1″
- Redshift: 0.4245 ±0.0005
- Other designations: GRB 190114C
- Related media on Commons

GRB 190114C was an extreme gamma-ray burst explosion from a galaxy 4.5 billion light years away (z=0.4245; magnitude=15.60est) in the constellation Fornax, that was initially detected in January 2019. The afterglow light emitted soon after the burst was found to be tera-electron volt radiation from inverse Compton emission, identified for the first time. According to the astronomers, "We observed a huge range of frequencies in the electromagnetic radiation afterglow of GRB 190114C. It is the most extensive to date for a gamma-ray burst." Also, according to other astronomers, "light detected from the object had the highest energy ever observed for a GRB: 1 Tera electron volt (TeV)—about one trillion times as much energy per photon as visible light"; another source stated, "the brightest light ever seen from Earth [to date]."

== Significance ==
Recent publications following the event indicate that inverse Compton scattering is the mechanism responsible for producing TeV photons. X-ray photons are scattered off of the GRB's polar jets of electrons, which move at 0.9999c. In a scattering event, much of the energy of a relativistic electron is transferred to a photon. Researchers "have been trying to observe such very high energy emission from GRB's for a long time, so this detection is considered a milestone in high-energy astrophysics". The most recent studies propose, in summary, a model of binary system of hypernova (BdHN I) with two neutron stars, where one of them collapses in a black hole, surrounded by an accretion disk and from whose poles the GRB is launched.

GRB 190114C

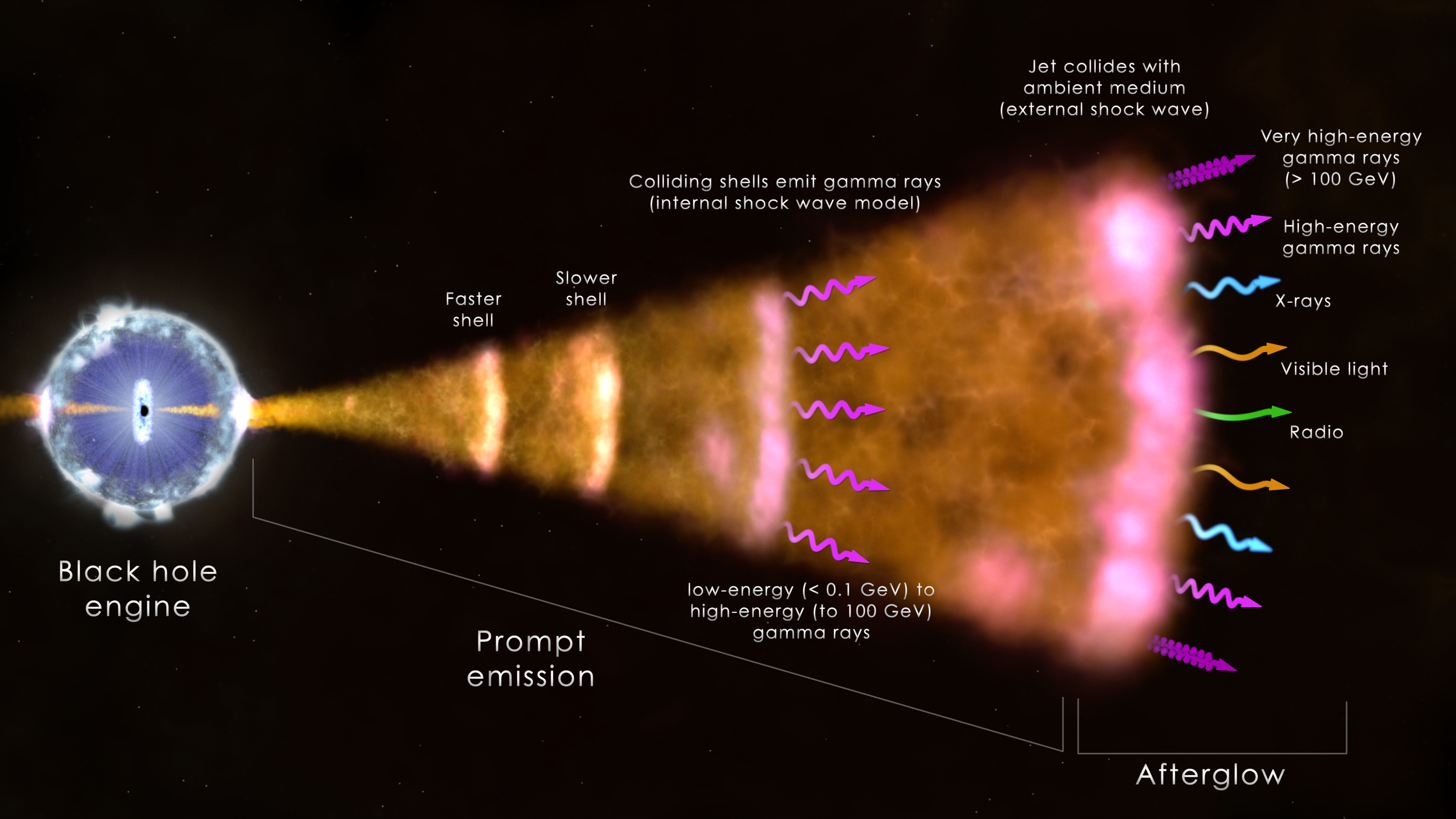
Mechanism of Gamma-ray bursts

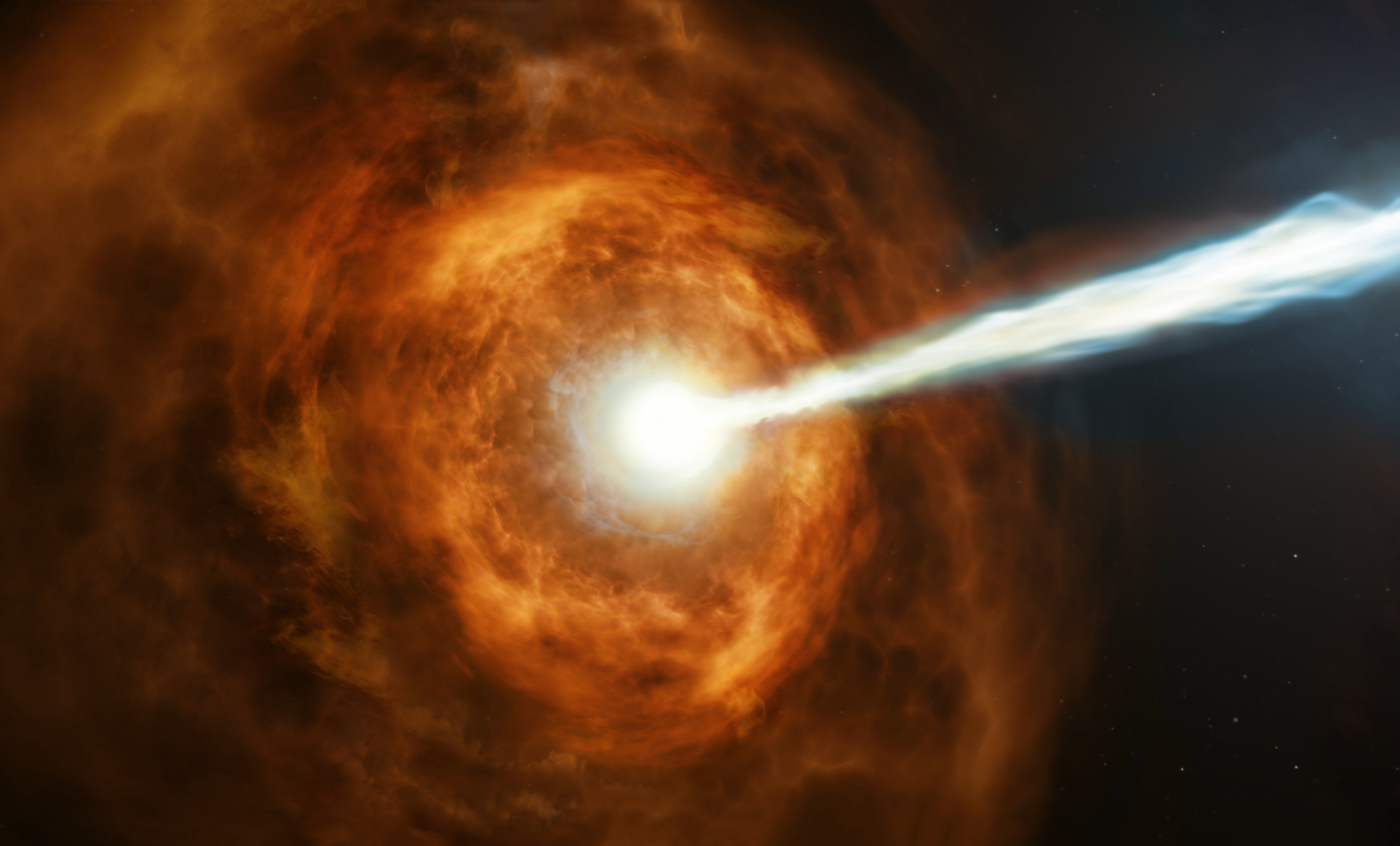
Artist impression

== See also ==
- GRB 020813
- GRB 080916C
- GRB 130427A
- List of gamma-ray bursts
