= GRB 031203 =

Gamma-ray burst

- Event type: Gamma-ray burst
- Constellation: Puppis
- Distance: 1.3 billion light years
- Other designations: GRB 031203, SN 2003lw
- Related media on Commons

GRB 031203 was a gamma-ray burst (GRB) detected on December 3, 2003. A gamma-ray burst is a highly luminous flash associated with an explosion in a distant galaxy and producing gamma rays, the most energetic form of electromagnetic radiation, and often followed by a longer-lived "afterglow" emitted at longer wavelengths (X-ray, ultraviolet, optical, infrared, and radio).

== Discovery ==
GRB 031203 was detected by INTEGRAL on December 3, 2003, at 22:01:28 UTC. The burst lasted 20 seconds and was located at a sky position of 08^{h} 02^{m} 30.20^{s} and −39° 51′ 03.90″. The burst's afterglow was detected in optical wavelengths by the Mercator Telescope, radio wavelengths by the Very Large Array, and X-ray wavelengths by the XMM-Newton satellite.

== X-ray halo ==
Observations of the detection region were made by XMM-Newton starting 6 hours after the burst was detected. The X-ray afterglow of the burst was surrounded by two concentric rings which increased in size as time elapsed. This was the first X-ray halo that had ever been observed around a gamma-ray burst. The rings were caused by light being scattered off of columns of dust between the gamma-ray burst and the detector.

== Energetics ==
At a redshift of z = 0.105, GRB 031203 was both the closest and faintest gamma-ray burst that had ever been observed. It was about 1.3 billion light-years from Earth. Gamma-ray bursts, which generally emit roughly the same amount of energy, had previously been treated as standard candles. However, GRB 031203 and the earlier GRB 980425 were notable exceptions to the standard candle model due to their low energy output. This led some researchers to believe that GRB 031203 may have been an X-ray flash, viewed off-axis, or a member of a previously unknown population of nearby faint bursts.

== See also ==
- List of gamma-ray bursts
