= XRF =

XRF may refer to:

- X-ray fluorescence, analytical technique
- X-ray flash (astronomy), celestial object
