= GRB 100621A =

June 2010 Gamma-ray burst in the constellation Indus

- Event type: Gamma-ray burst
- Constellation: Indus
- Right ascension: 21^{h} 01^{m} 13.12^{s}
- Declination: −51° 06′ 22.5″
- Other designations: GRB 100621A

GRB 100621A was a long gamma-ray burst observed on June 21, 2010, by the Swift spacecraft. It is the third brightest gamma-ray burst yet observed, after GRB 221009A and GRB 130427A. However when it was discovered, it was the brightest GRB in terms of X-ray brightness. GRB 100621A is approximately five billion light years from Earth.
