= GRB 070714B =

Highly luminous gamma ray burst from a neutron star merger

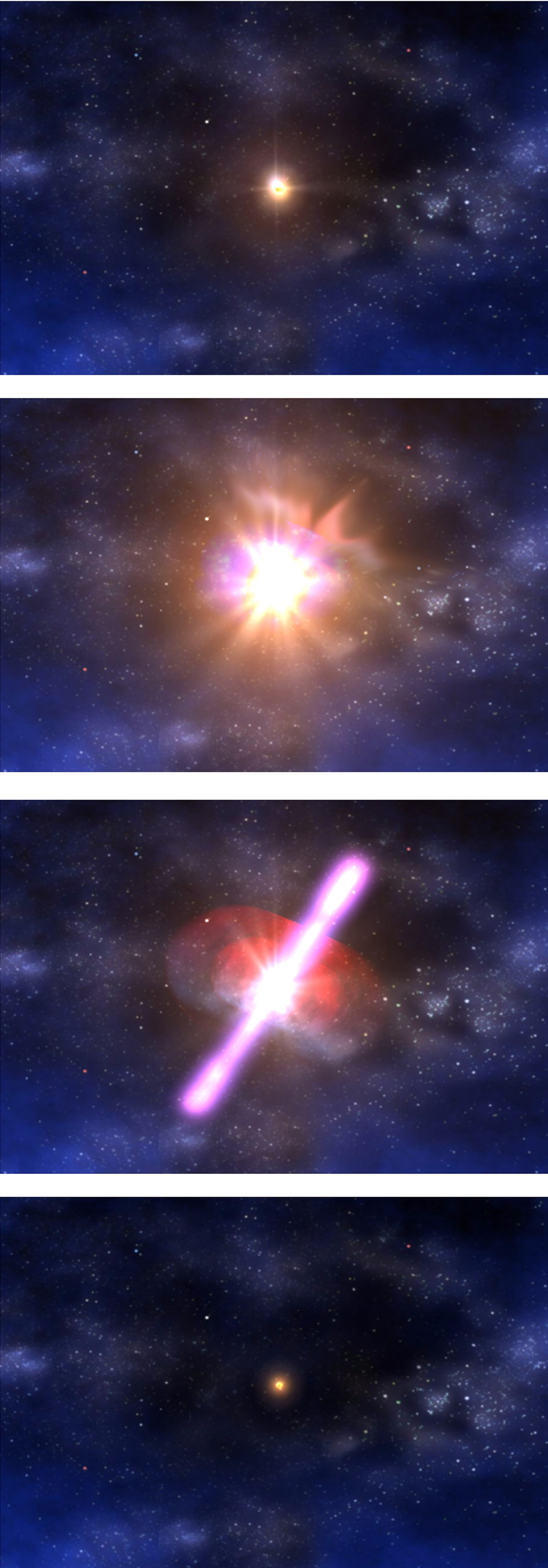
- Illustration of GRB 070714B
- Event type: Gamma-ray burst
- Constellation: Taurus
- Right ascension: 03^{h} 51^{m} 22.29^{s}
- Declination: +28° 17′ 52.2″
- Distance: 7,400,000,000 ly (2.3×10^{9} pc)
- Total energy output: 1.2×10^{51} ergs
- Other designations: GRB 070714B
- Related media on Commons

GRB 070714B was a gamma-ray burst (GRB) that was detected on 14 July 2007 at 04:59 UTC. A gamma-ray burst is a highly luminous flash associated with an explosion in a distant galaxy and producing gamma rays, the most energetic form of electromagnetic radiation, and often followed by a longer-lived "afterglow" emitted at longer wavelengths (X-ray, ultraviolet, optical, infrared, and radio).

At a total duration of only 3 seconds, GRB 070714B was classified as a short burst, a subclass of GRBs which is believed to be caused by the merger of two neutron stars. GRB 070714B had a redshift of z = 0.92, corresponding to a distance of about 7.4 billion light years, making it the most distant short burst detected as of 2007.

== Observations ==
GRB 070714B was detected by the Swift Gamma-Ray Burst Mission satellite on 14 July 2007 at 04:59 UTC. The burst lasted only 3 seconds and reached its peak intensity 0.2 seconds after the initial detection. The optical afterglow was detected by the Liverpool Telescope and the William Herschel Telescope.

== Distance record ==
Spectroscopy of the optical afterglow and the burst's host galaxy revealed a single emission line of oxygen at a redshift of z = 0.92. This corresponds to a distance of 7.4 billion light years, making it the oldest and most distant short burst ever detected. The previous record holder had been GRB 051221A at a redshift of z = 0.546. At a redshift of z = 0.92, the total energy released by GRB 070714B (assuming isotropic emission) was approximately 1.2×10^{51} ergs, which is several orders of magnitude higher than short-duration bursts with a redshift less than z = 0.5, but still significantly smaller than typical long-duration bursts.
