= X-ray flash =

X-ray flash may refer to:

- X-ray flash (astronomy)
- Brief artificial production of X-rays
