= GRB 011211 =

Gamma-ray burst event detected December 11, 2001

- Event type: Gamma-ray burst
- Constellation: Crater
- Right ascension: 168^{h} 49^{m} 4.8^{s}
- Declination: −21° 55′ 44.4″
- Redshift: 2.14 ±0.01, 2.14
- Total energy output: 5×10^{52} ergs
- Other designations: GRB 011211

GRB 011211 was a gamma-ray burst (GRB) detected on December 11, 2001. A gamma-ray burst is a highly luminous flash associated with an explosion in a distant galaxy and producing gamma rays, the most energetic form of electromagnetic radiation, and often followed by a longer-lived "afterglow" emitted at longer wavelengths (X-ray, ultraviolet, optical, infrared, and radio).

== Observations ==
GRB 011211 was detected by the Italian–Dutch X-ray astronomy satellite BeppoSAX on 11 December 2001 at 19:09 UTC. The burst lasted 270 seconds, making it the longest burst that had ever been detected by BeppoSAX up to that point. A spectrum recorded by the Yepun telescope indicated a redshift of z = 2.14.

== Supernova relation ==
A team of researchers at the University of Leicester conducted an analysis of the burst's X-ray afterglow with the XMM-Newton observatory. They found evidence for emission lines of magnesium, silicon, sulphur, and various other chemical elements. This was the first detection of these elements in the spectrum of a GRB. These observations provided strong evidence for a relation between gamma-ray bursts and supernova. However, other astronomers pointed out flaws in the methodology of the Leicester research team, such as the data reduction methods, the low statistical significance of the emission lines, and the low spectral resolution of the instrument used. Despite a follow-up paper from the Leicester team to address these concerns, the findings remained controversial, and GRB 020813 was given the distinction of being the first burst with direct evidence of a supernova relation.

== Host galaxy ==
Optical, infrared, and X-ray observations taken by the Hubble Space Telescope between 14 and 59 days after the burst's detection revealed a blue galaxy with an apparent magnitude of 24.95 ± 0.11. Like several other gamma-ray burst hosts, Lyman alpha emission was detected from this galaxy, supporting the theory that the progenitors of gamma-ray burst tend to be metal-poor.
