= XRF 020427 =

X-ray flash in poor seeing conditions

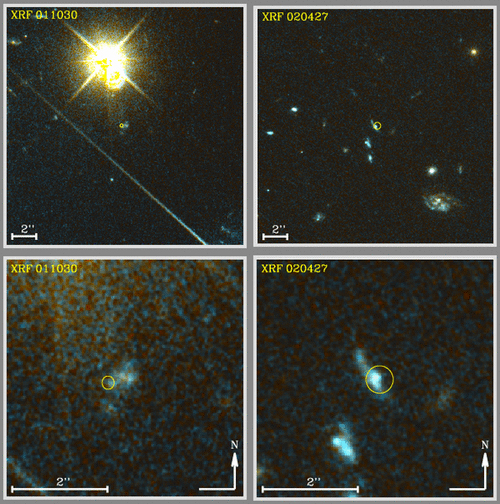
- (Two right images) XRF 020427
- Event type: X-ray flash
- Date: 10 June 2002
- Instrument: Hubble Space Telescope (HST)
- Redshift: ~3.5
- Other designations: GRB 020427, XRF 020427

XRF 020427 was an X-ray flash. It was observed with the Hubble Space Telescope (HST) on the 10th of June 2002 in rather poor seeing conditions. The afterglow of this XRF resembles the properties of some gamma-ray bursts (GRB). This is probably due to an inefficient shock from XRF 020427. This further strengthens the connection of X-ray burst to GRBs.
