= 1ES 1927+654 =

Galaxy in the constellation Draco

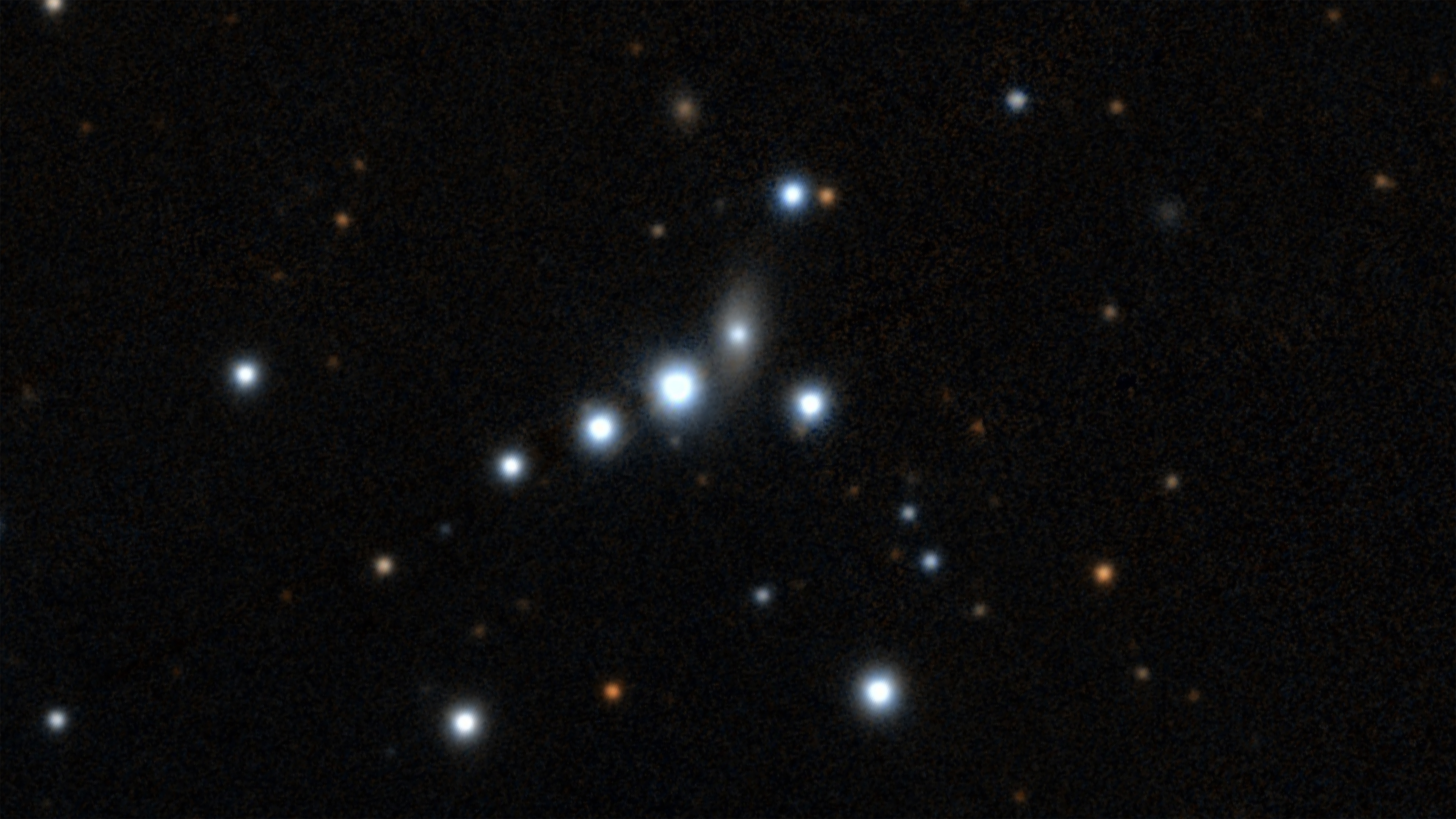
- The Seyfert galaxy 1ES 1927+654

Observation data (J2000 epoch)
- Constellation: Draco
- Right ascension: 19^{h} 27^{m} 19.7557^{s}
- Declination: +65° 33′ 52.47″
- Redshift: 0.016998
- Distance: 270 Mly

Other designations
- 2MASX J19271951+6533539, RX J1927.3+6533

1ES 1927+654 is a type 2 Seyfert galaxy located 270 million light-years away in the constellation of Draco, containing an active galactic nucleus. The galaxy is relatively unremarkable in appearance but its core is powered by a supermassive black hole which is a source of X-ray flashes.

The brightness and oscillations of this nucleus have behaved unpredictably and so become the subject of special observation and study in the optical, radio, ultraviolet and X-ray spectrums. Academic papers analysing its unusual characteristics have challenged conventional theories about accretion disks and black hole environments.

1ES 1927+654 is the catalog reference for the object in the Einstein Slew Survey – a scan of the sky in the X-ray spectrum which was performed by the Einstein Observatory and first published in 1992.

== Timeline of discoveries ==
1ES 1927+654 has captured the attention of astronomers due to its unpredictable behavior. Its sudden changes have made it a target for multi-wavelength observation campaigns, drawing data from X-ray, optical, and radio observatories around the world.

1ES 1927+654 was first cataloged during the Einstein Slew Survey, which aimed to identify X-ray sources in the sky. It was classified as a Seyfert galaxy due to its emission-line features.

A dramatic increase in brightness was detected in 2017, with the galaxy brightening by a factor of about 40 in the ultraviolet spectrum. This event triggered follow-up studies to investigate the cause. In 2018, detailed observations by X-ray and ultraviolet telescopes revealed that the AGN's accretion disk had undergone a partial or total disruption. The Quasi-periodic oscillation (QPO) period shrank from 18 to 7.1 minutes over two years, showing unique evolution. Future X-ray and gravitational-wave observations are planned to test possible explanations.

In 2020, studies suggested that the extreme variability could be linked to magnetic field instabilities around the black hole. The event challenged models of black hole accretion and inspired new theories about AGN outbursts.

In 2023–24, very-long-baseline interferometry observed plasma jets forming near the black hole.

== Gallery ==
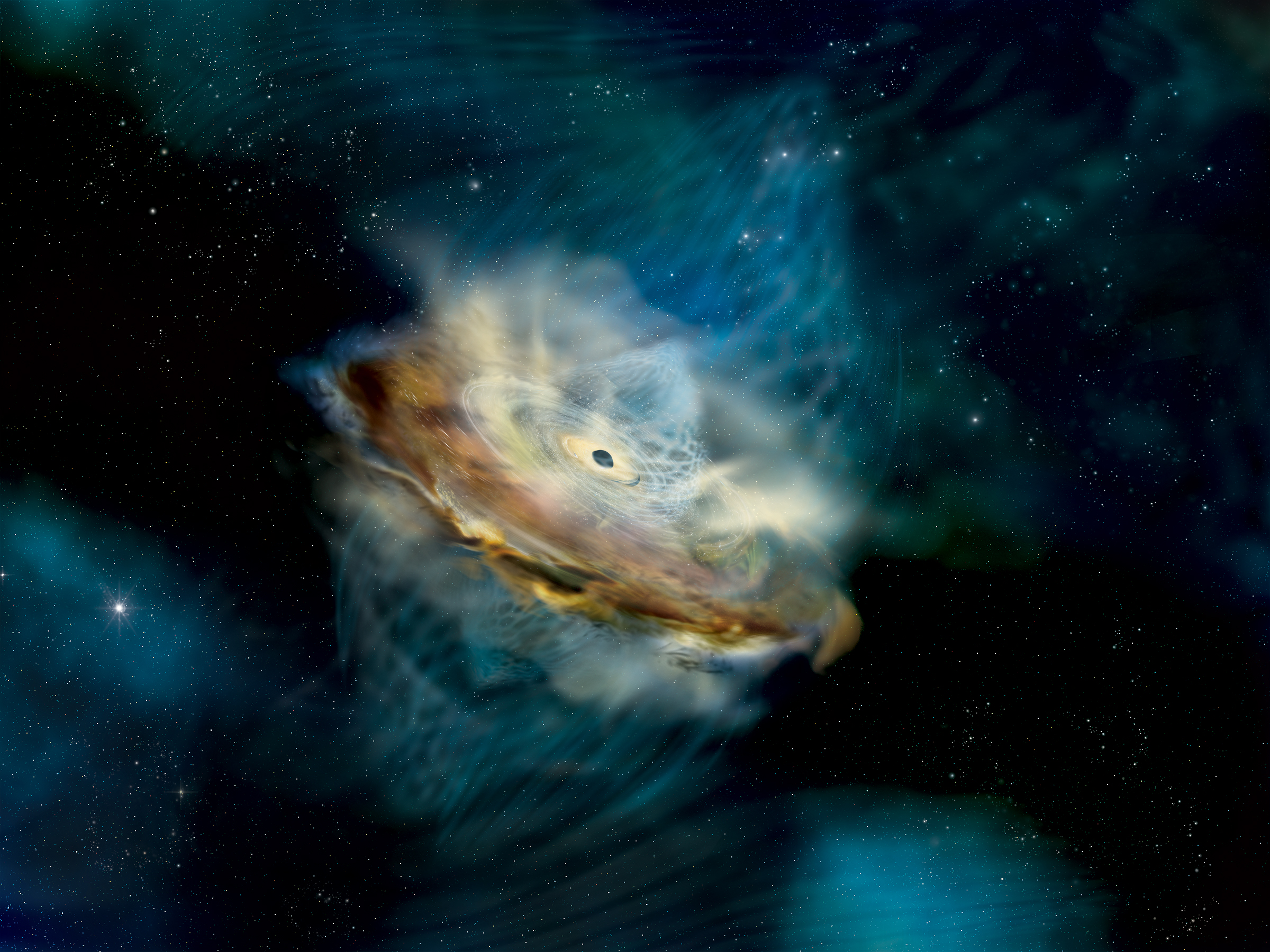
This illustration shows the accretion disk, corona (pale, conical swirls above the disk), and supermassive black hole of 1ES 1927+654
Credit: NASA/Sonoma State University, Aurore Simonnet

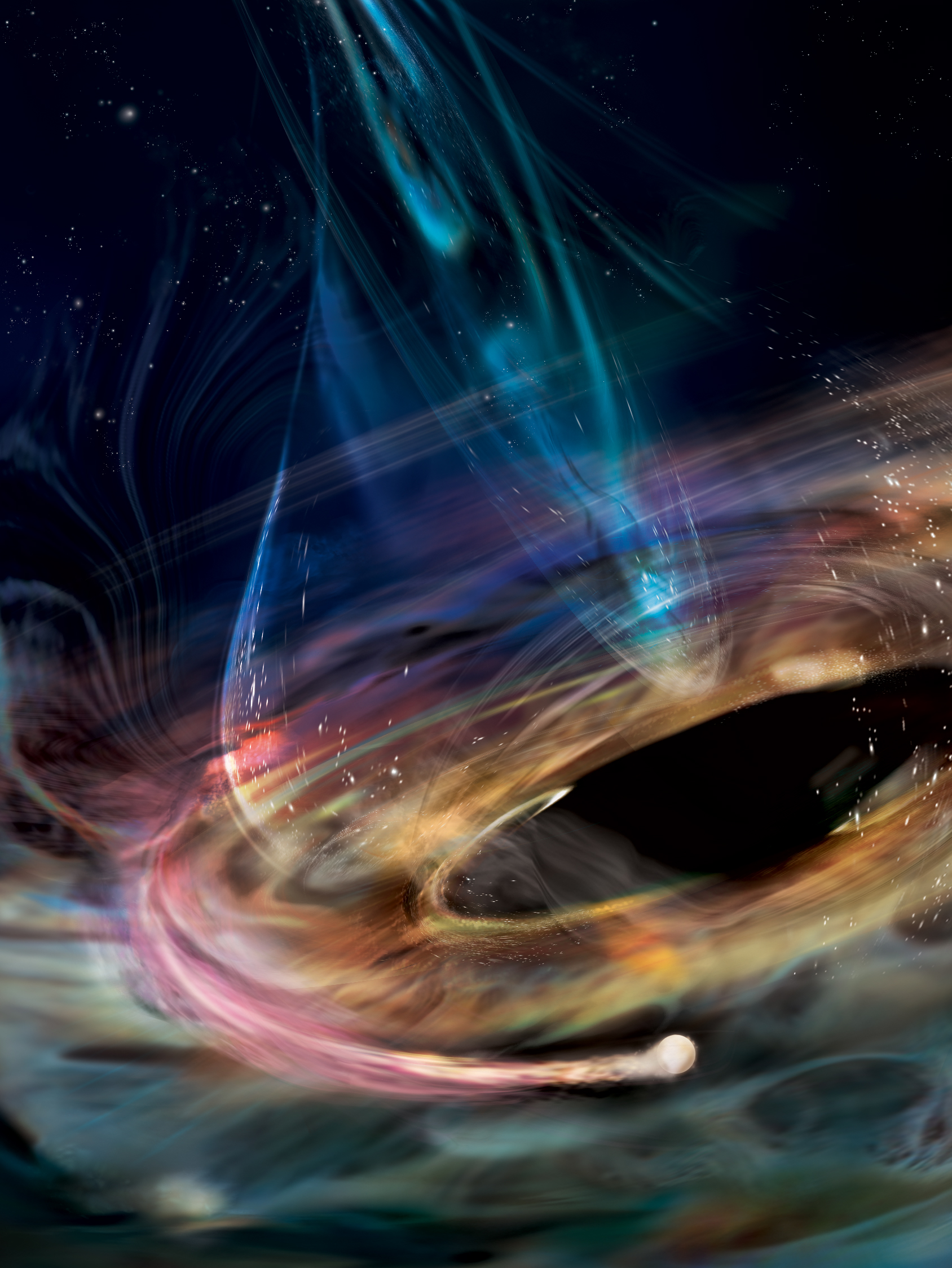
Artist's concept
Matter is stripped from a white dwarf (sphere at lower right) orbiting within the innermost accretion disk surrounding 1ES 1927+654's supermassive black hole.
