= XRF 011030 =

X-ray flash in a stellar wind environment

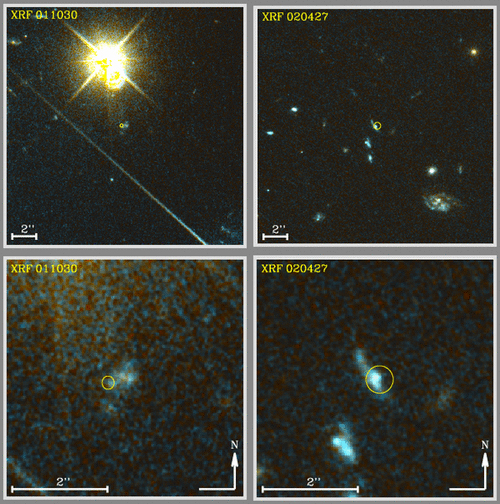
- (Two left images) XRF 011030
- Event type: X-ray flash
- Duration: 1500 seconds
- Instrument: BeppoSAX
- Redshift: 3.5
- Notable features: One of the longest X-ray flashes to date
- Other designations: GRB 011030, XRF 011030

XRF 011030 was a long X-ray flash (XRF) that lasted for about 1500 seconds making it one of the longest X-ray flash observed by BeppoSAX to date. It lies at a distance less than z=3.5. Observations of XRF 011030 are consistent with a thick shelled fireball expanding on a stellar wind environment or a jetted fireball in an interstellar medium (ISM). But it can also be explained by both a stellar wind environment and a interstellar medium. Because of the short distance from earth, it is likely not a gamma-ray burst (GRB).

It was observed by BeppoSAX about 1300 seconds after the burst.
