= SN 1998bw =

Supernova/gamma-ray burst in the constellation Telescopium

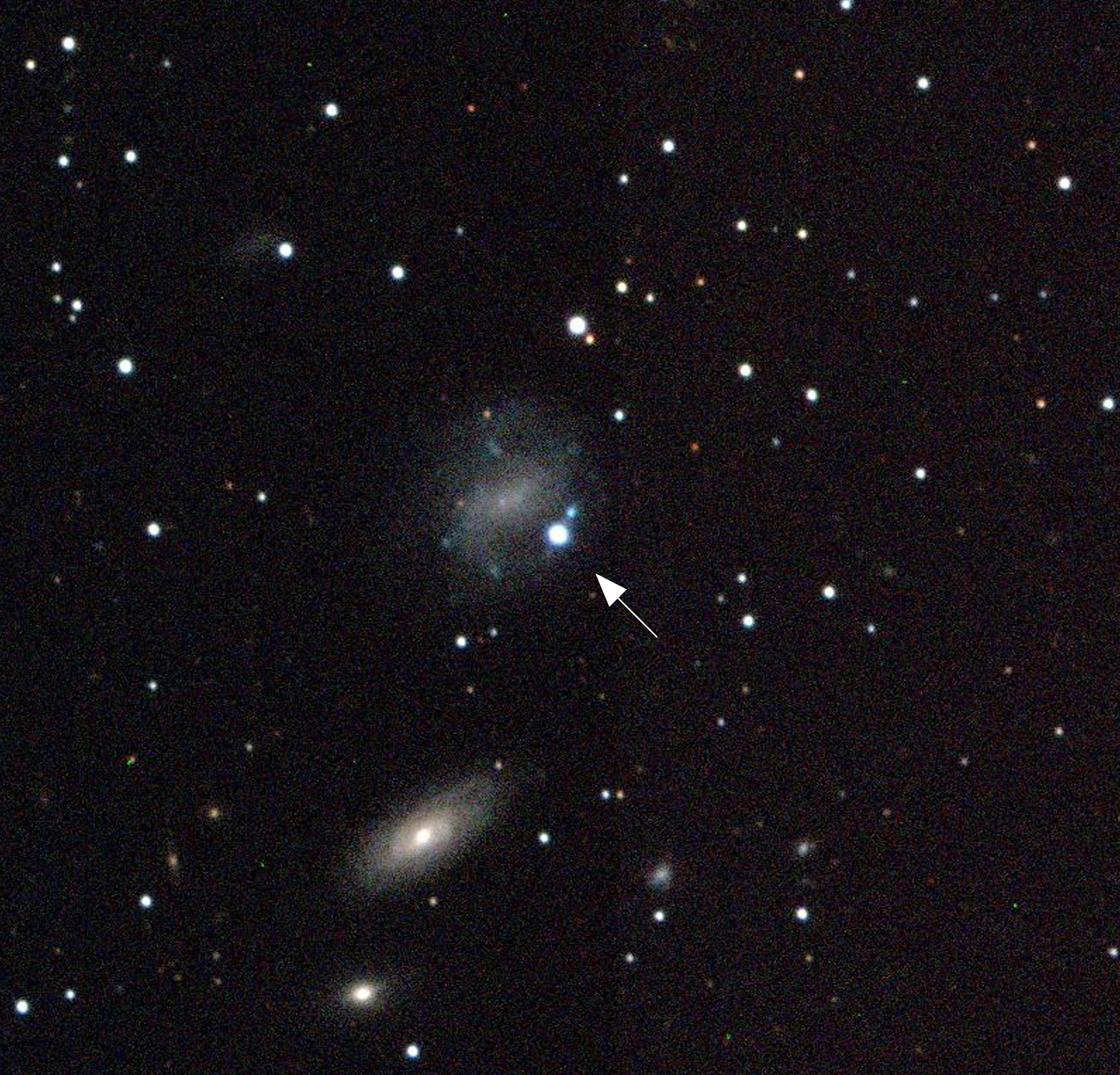
- Occurred on the galaxy ESO 184-G82
- Event type: Supernova
- Type Ic
- Date: 26 April 1998
- Constellation: Telescopium
- Right ascension: 19^{h} 35^{m} 03.17^{s}
- Declination: −52° 50′ 46.1″
- Galactic coordinates: 344.99°, −27.72°
- Redshift: 0.0085
- Host: ESO 184-G82
- Related media on Commons

SN 1998bw was a rare broad-lined Type Ic gamma ray burst supernova detected on 26 April 1998 in the ESO 184-G82 spiral galaxy, which some astronomers believe may be an example of a collapsar (hypernova). The hypernova has been linked to GRB 980425, which was detected on 25 April 1998, the first time a gamma-ray burst has been linked to a supernova. The hypernova is approximately 140 million light years away, very close for a gamma ray burst source.

The region of the galaxy where the supernova occurred hosts stars 5-8 million years old and is relatively free from dust. A nearby region hosts multiple Wolf-Rayet stars less than 3 million years old, but it is unlikely that the supernova progenitor could be a runaway from that region. The implication is that the progenitor was a star that originally had a mass of 25-40 M_{☉}, if it exploded as a single star at the end of its life.

== Observations ==
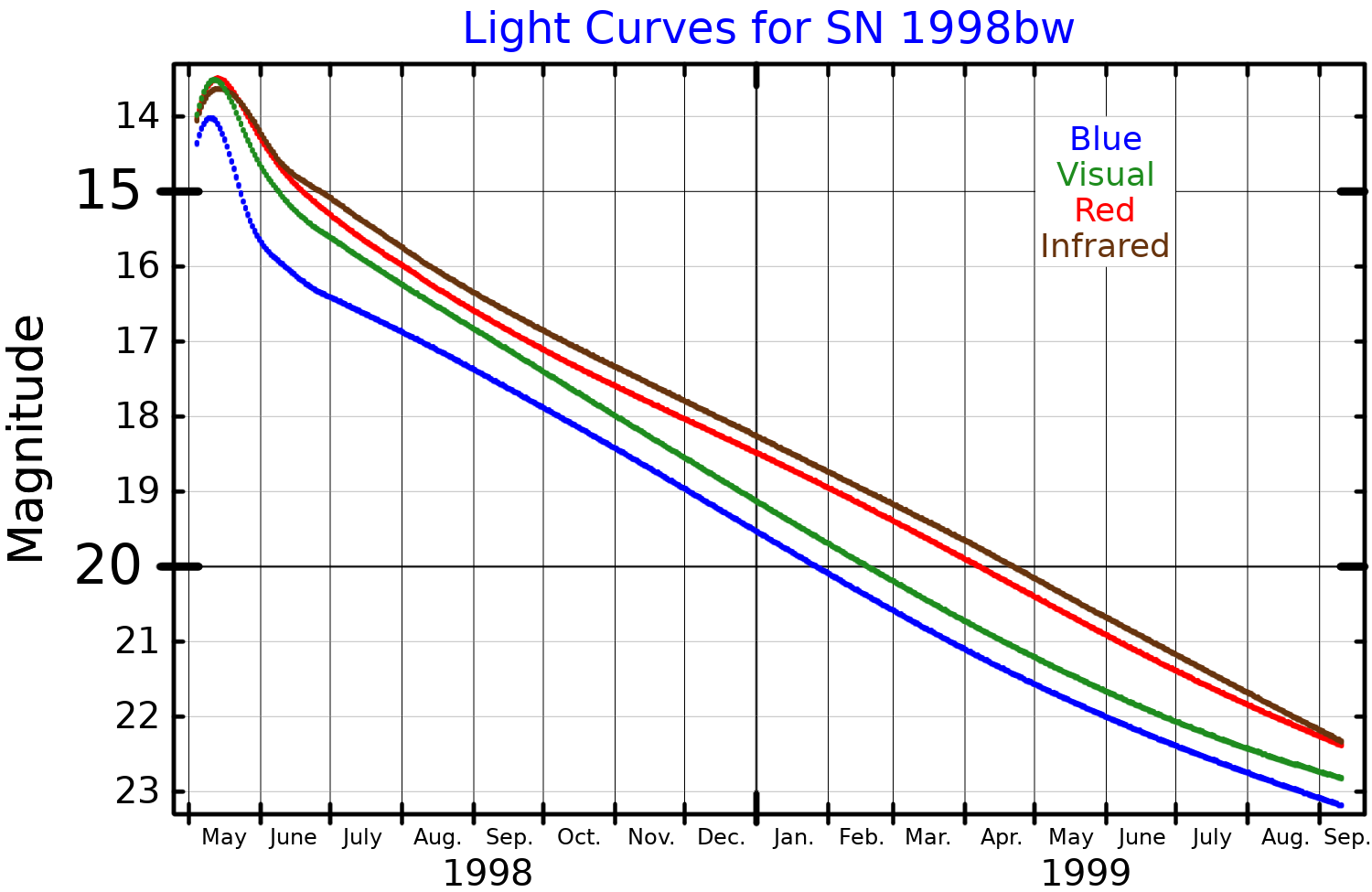
Light curves in four photometric bands for SN 1998bw, plotted from data published by Clocchiatti et al. (2011)

On 25 April 1998, a gamma ray burst was detected by the BeppoSAX satellite and assigned the identifier GRB 980425. The event lasted for 30 seconds, and was about average in terms of burst flux. A check of images from the ESO New Technology Telescope showed a rapidly brightening point source within the error box of GRB 980425. It was located in the face-on spiral galaxy ESO 184-G82, in a spiral arm at an offset from the nucleus. This candidate supernova event lacked spectral lines of hydrogen, ruling out a normal core-collapse Type II supernova, and it was a missing line of silicon that indicated it is not a typical Type Ia supernova.

A few weeks after full light, the spectrum of supernova SN 1998bw showed no clear indications of helium. This suggested the event be classed as a Type Ic supernova, although it showed some peculiarities compared to other supernovae of this type. The expansion velocity measured from calcium lines was measured as 11,700 km/s, and 9,100 km/s from silicon lines. The maximum recorded expansion velocities reached 3×10^{4} km/s. Energy emissions from the supernova showed polarization, which supported a core-collapse scenario with asymmetry.

Radio measurements of the supernova showed that it was unusually luminous in this band. The data suggested a shock wave moving at a relativistic velocity, whereas most supernovae ejecta are non-relativistic. This was the first evidence found for a relativistic shock from a supernova. The supernova light curves from radio to X-ray bands also indicated a blast wave that was highly relativistic. The data was consistent with a physical association between SN 1998bw and GRB 980425, and supported the idea of a hypernova or collapsar event. This scenario results in the formation of a black hole from the collapse of a massive star. Spherically-symmetrical models failed to reproduce an event with this energy level, indicating a highly asymmetrical explosion that produced the gamma-ray burst from a relativistic jet. In this case, only a fraction of the progenitor's stellar mass was ejected, with the remainder collapsing to form a black hole.

The supernova transitioned to the nebular phase around 100 days after the explosion. Expansion velocities remained very high compared to other core-collapse supernovae at similar phases. The unusual spectrum observed during the nebular phase matched a model for a strongly aspherical explosion observed from near the direction of a relativistic jet. The radio emission from the supernova can best be explained by interaction between the relativistic shock and clumpy circumstellar medium previously ejected by a strong stellar wind. Observations from the Chandra X-ray Observatory in 2004 found X-ray emission that supported this scenario. It also lent support to the idea that the supernova and gamma-ray burst were the same event.

=== Environment ===
Observations with the Hubble Space Telescope indicated that the host for the supernova event is a sub-luminous galaxy with a morphological classification of SBc. This indicates ESO 184-G82 is a barred spiral galaxy with loosely-wound spiral arms. The galaxy is undergoing strong star formation and the supernova occurred in an active star forming area that includes an H II region. This environment is fairly typical for Type II supernovae. The supernova afterglow was about a magnitude brighter than expected from a radioactive decay model, suggesting a contribution from a surrounding stellar cluster.

The host galaxy appears morphologically disturbed, which suggests interaction from nearby galaxies. This could explain the amplified star forming process. Six galaxies lie within the field of ESO 184-G82 but none of them have a matching redshift of 0.0087±0.0006. Thus, it appears to be an isolated dwarf galaxy and another explanation is needed for the star formation. A 2020 study with the Atacama Large Millimeter Array discovered the galaxy has a ring of dense neutral hydrogen, which includes clumps of gas. One of these clumps was the host of SN 1998bw. The presence of a ring indicates a past collision with a companion galaxy.
