= ESO 184-G82 =

Galaxy in the constellation of Telescopium

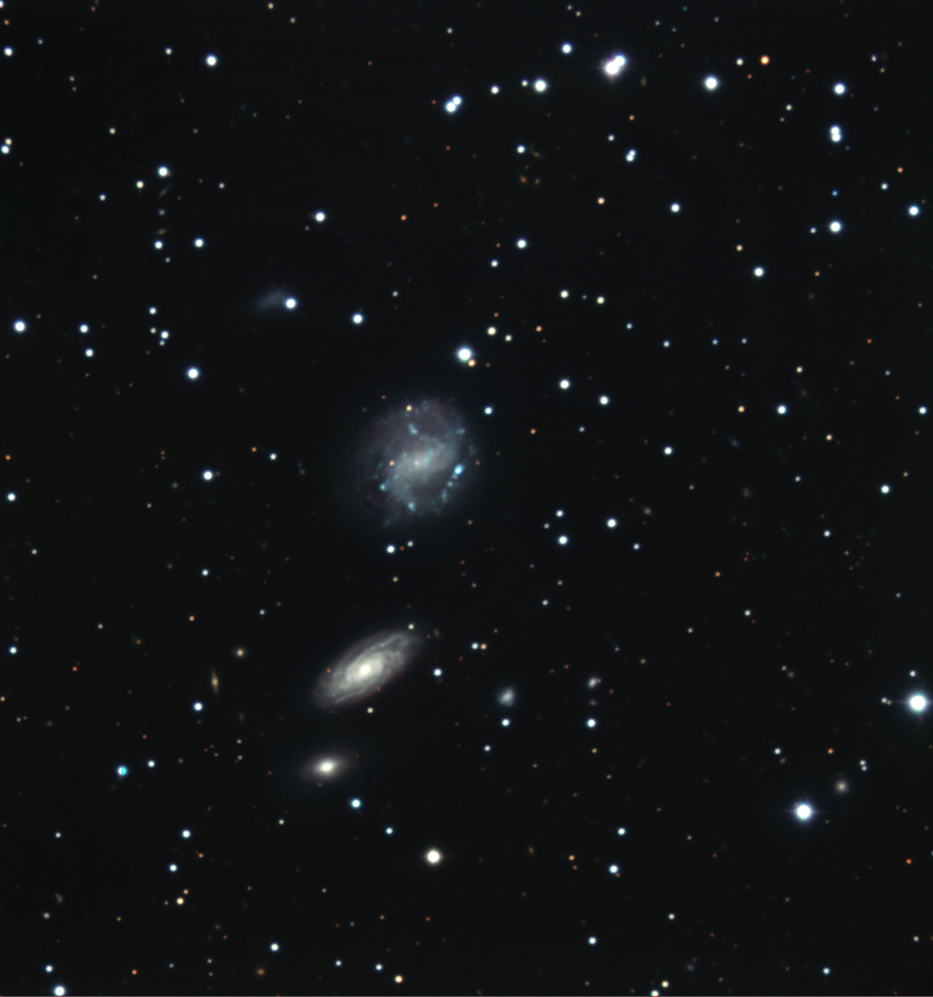
- ESO 184-G82

Observation data
- Constellation: Telescopium
- Right ascension: 19h 35m 4.11s
- Declination: -52° 50' 42.80"
- Distance: 120 million ly
- Notable features: Hosted a GRB that was the first evidence of SN-GRB relation

ESO 184-G82 is a barred spiral galaxy located in the constellation of Telescopium around 120 million light years from Earth. The galaxy is known for hosting a supernova named SN 1998bw. This supernova occurred around the same time as the gamma ray burst (GRB) named GRB 980425. This provided the first direct evidence of the relation between supernovae and gamma ray bursts.

The stellar population of ESO 184-G82 is largely dominated by older stars, which is in contrast to the majority of galaxies hosting GRBs. There is a Wolf–Rayet region located ~800 parsecs from the site of SN 1998bw that has experienced an episode of star formation.
