= GRB 051221A =

Gamma ray burst in 2005

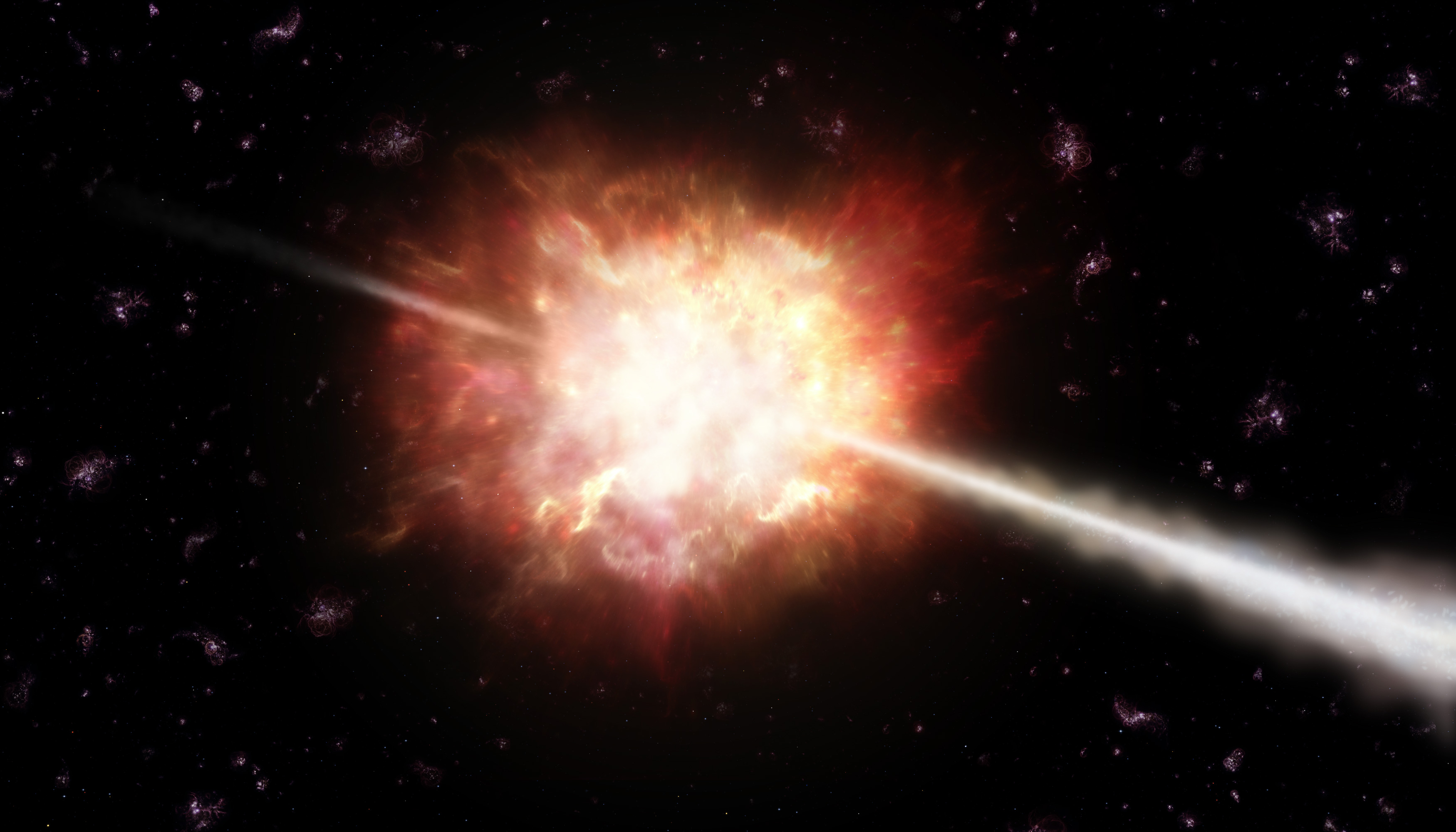
- Event type: Gamma-ray burst
- Date: c. 5 billion years ago (detected 21 December 2005)
- Duration: c. 1.4 seconds
- Instrument: Swift
- Constellation: Pegasus
- Distance: c. 5 billion ly
- Redshift: 0.5464
- Other designations: GRB 051221, GRB 051221A
- Related media on Commons

GRB 051221A was a gamma ray burst (GRB) that was detected by NASA's Swift Gamma-Ray Burst Mission on December 21, 2005. The coordinates of the burst were α=21^{h} 54^{m} 50.7^{s}, δ=16° 53′ 31.9″, and it lasted about 1.4 seconds. The same satellite discovered X-ray emission from the same object, and the GMOS Instrument on the Gemini Observatory discovered an afterglow in the visible spectrum. This was observed for the next ten days, allowing a redshift of Z = 0.5464 to be determined for the host galaxy.

The gamma ray emission from this object is of the variety known as a short-hard burst. The energy emission is consistent with the model of a merger by compact objects. It was the most distant short-hard burst found to that date for which a redshift could be determined. The X-ray light curve showed evidence of three distinct breaks, possibly representing a strong energy injection. The energy may have been injected by a millisecond magnetar. That is, a rapidly rotating pulsar with a strong magnetic field, estimated at 10^{14} gauss (10^{10} teslas).
