= Hypernova =

Supernova that ejects a large mass at unusually high velocity

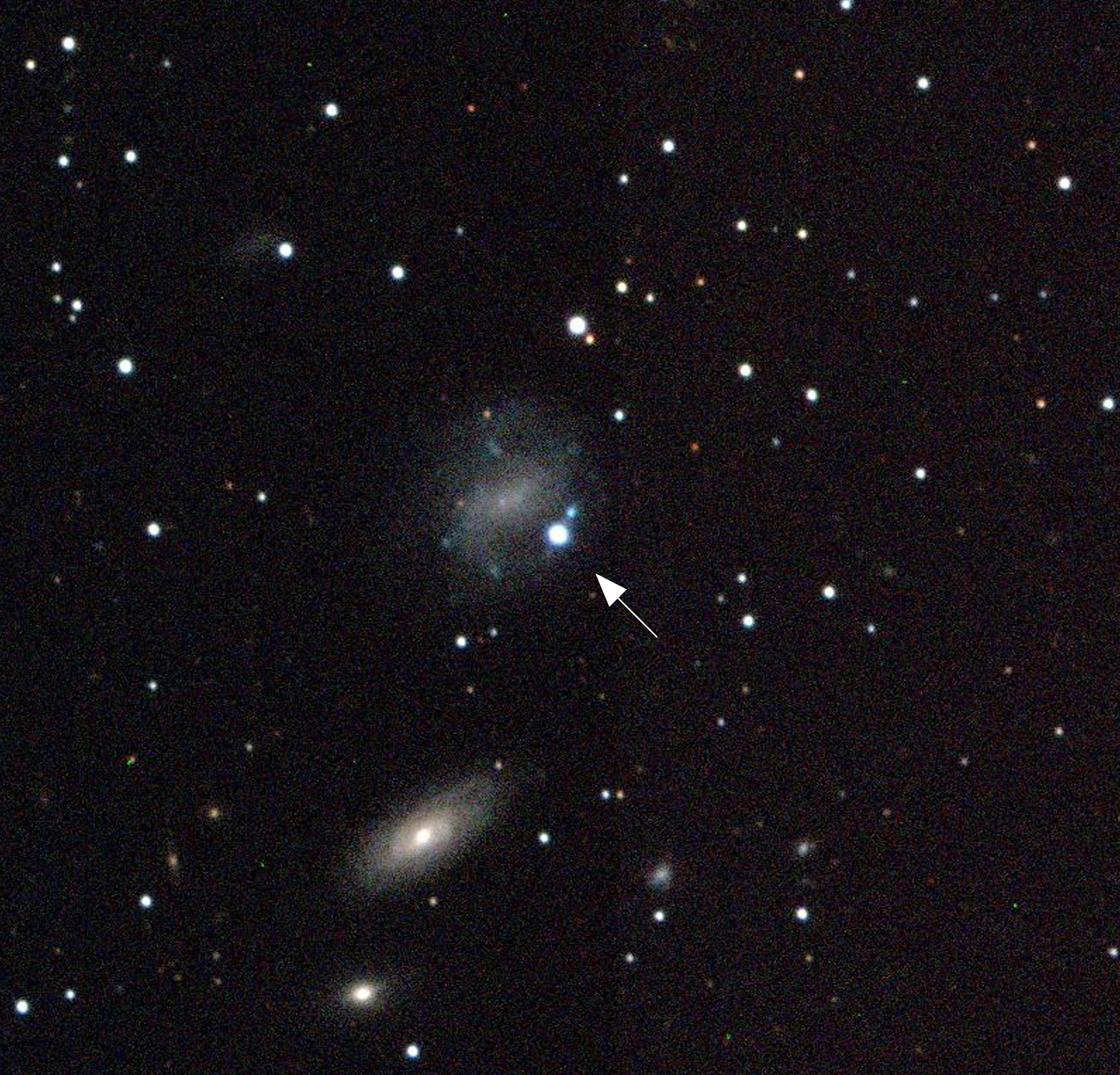
ESO image of SN 1998bw, believed by some astronomers to be a hypernova, in a spiral arm of galaxy ESO 184-G82.

A hypernova is a very energetic supernova which is believed to result from an extreme core collapse scenario. In this case, a massive star (>30 solar masses) collapses to form a rotating black hole emitting twin astrophysical jets and surrounded by an accretion disk. It is a type of stellar explosion that ejects material with an unusually high kinetic energy, an order of magnitude higher than most supernovae, with a luminosity at least 10 times greater. Hypernovae release such intense gamma rays that they often appear similar to a Type Ic supernova, but with unusually broad spectral lines indicating an extremely high expansion velocity. Hypernovae are one of the mechanisms for producing long gamma ray bursts (GRBs), which range from 2 seconds to over a minute in duration. They have also been referred to as superluminous supernovae, though that classification also includes other types of extremely luminous stellar explosions that have different origins.

== History ==
In the 1980s, the term hypernova was used to describe a theoretical type of supernova now known as a pair-instability supernova. It referred to the extremely high energy of the explosion compared to typical core collapse supernovae. The term had previously been used to describe hypothetical explosions from diverse events such as hypergiants, extremely massive population III stars in the early universe, or from events such as black hole mergers.

In February 1997, Dutch-Italian satellite BeppoSAX was able to trace GRB 970508 to a faint galaxy roughly 6 billion light years away. From analyzing the spectroscopic data for both the GRB 970508 and its host galaxy, Bloom et al. concluded in 1998 that a hypernova was the likely cause. That same year, hypernovae were hypothesized in greater detail by Polish astronomer Bohdan Paczyński as supernovae from rapidly spinning stars.

The usage of the term hypernova from the late 20th century has since been refined to refer to those supernovae with unusually large kinetic energy. The first hypernova observed was SN 1998bw, with a luminosity 100 times higher than a standard Type Ib. This supernova was the first to be associated with a gamma-ray burst (GRB) and it produced a shockwave containing an order of magnitude more energy than a normal supernova. Other scientists prefer to call these objects simply broad-lined Type Ic supernovae. Since then the term has been applied to a variety of objects, not all of which meet the standard definition; for example ASASSN-15lh.

In 2023, the observation of the highly energetic, non-quasar transient event AT2021lwx was published with an extremely strong emission from mid-infrared to X-ray wavelengths and an overall energy of 1.5×10^{46} joules. This object is not thought to be a hypernova; instead, it is likely to be a huge gas cloud being absorbed by a massive black hole. The event was also assigned the random name "ZTF20abrbeie" by the Zwicky Transient Facility. This name and the seeming ferocity of the event led to nickname "Scary Barbie", drawing the attention of the mainstream press.

== Properties ==
Hypernovae are thought to be supernovae with ejecta having a kinetic energy larger than about 10^{45} joule, an order of magnitude higher than a typical core collapse supernova. The ejected nickel masses are large and the ejection velocity up to 99% of the speed of light. These are typically of Type Ic, and some are associated with long-duration gamma-ray bursts. The electromagnetic energy released by these events varies from comparable to other Type Ic supernova, to some of the most luminous supernovae known such as SN 1999as.

The archetypal hypernova, SN 1998bw, was associated with GRB 980425. Its spectrum showed no hydrogen and no clear helium features, but strong silicon lines identified it as a Type Ic supernova. The main absorption lines were extremely broadened and the light curve showed a very rapid brightening phase, reaching the brightness of a Type Ia supernova at day 16. The total ejected mass was about 10 M_{☉} and the mass of nickel ejected about 0.4 M_{☉}. All supernovae associated with GRBs have shown the high-energy ejecta that characterises them as hypernovae.

Unusually bright radio supernovae have been observed as counterparts to hypernovae, and have been termed "radio hypernovae".

== Astrophysical models ==
Models for hypernovae focus on the efficient transfer of energy into the ejecta. In normal core collapse supernovae, 99% of neutrinos generated in the collapsing core escape without driving the ejection of material. It is thought that rotation of the supernova progenitor drives a jet that accelerates material away from the explosion at close to the speed of light. Binary systems are increasingly being studied as the best method for both stripping stellar envelopes to leave a bare carbon-oxygen core, and for inducing the necessary spin conditions to drive a hypernova.

=== Collapsar model ===
The collapsar model describes a type of supernova that produces a gravitationally collapsed object, or black hole. The word "collapsar", short for "collapsed star", was formerly used to refer to the end product of stellar gravitational collapse, a stellar-mass black hole. The word is now sometimes used to refer to a specific model for the collapse of a fast-rotating star. When core collapse occurs in a star with a core at least around fifteen times the Sun's mass (M_{☉})—though chemical composition and rotational rate are also significant—the explosion energy is insufficient to expel the outer layers of the star, and it will collapse into a black hole without producing a visible supernova outburst.

A star with a core mass slightly below this level—in the range of 5–15 M_{☉}—will undergo a supernova explosion, but so much of the ejected mass falls back onto the core remnant that it still collapses into a black hole. If such a star is rotating slowly, then it will produce a faint supernova, but if the star is rotating quickly enough, then the fallback to the black hole will produce relativistic jets. Those powerful jets plough through stellar material creating strong shock waves, with the vigorous winds of newly-formed ^{56}Ni blowing off the accretion disk, detonating the hypernova explosion. The ejected radioactive decay of ^{56}Ni renders the visible outburst substantially more luminous than a standard supernova. The jets also beam high energy particles and gamma rays directly outward and thereby produce x-ray or gamma-ray bursts; the jets can last for several seconds or longer and correspond to long-duration gamma-ray bursts, but they do not appear to explain short-duration gamma-ray bursts.

=== Binary models ===
The mechanism for producing the stripped progenitor, a carbon-oxygen star lacking any significant hydrogen or helium, of Type Ic supernovae was once thought to be an extremely evolved massive star, for example a type WO Wolf-Rayet star whose dense stellar wind expelled all its outer layers. Observations have failed to detect any such progenitors. It is still not conclusively shown that the progenitors are actually a different type of object, but several cases suggest that lower-mass "helium giants" are the progenitors. These stars are not sufficiently massive to expel their envelopes simply by stellar winds, and they would be stripped by mass transfer to a binary companion. Helium giants are increasingly favoured as the progenitors of Type Ib supernovae, but the progenitors of Type Ic supernovae is still uncertain.

One proposed mechanism for producing gamma-ray bursts is induced gravitational collapse, where a neutron star is triggered to collapse into a black hole by the core collapse of a close companion consisting of a stripped carbon-oxygen core. The induced neutron star collapse allows for the formation of jets and high-energy ejecta that have been difficult to model from a single star.

== See also ==
- Gamma-ray burst progenitors – Types of celestial objects that can emit gamma-ray bursts
- Quark star – Compact exotic star which forms matter consisting mostly of quarks
- Quark-nova – Hypothetical explosion of a neutron star
