= GRB 020813 =

Supernova gamma-ray burst, detected in 2002

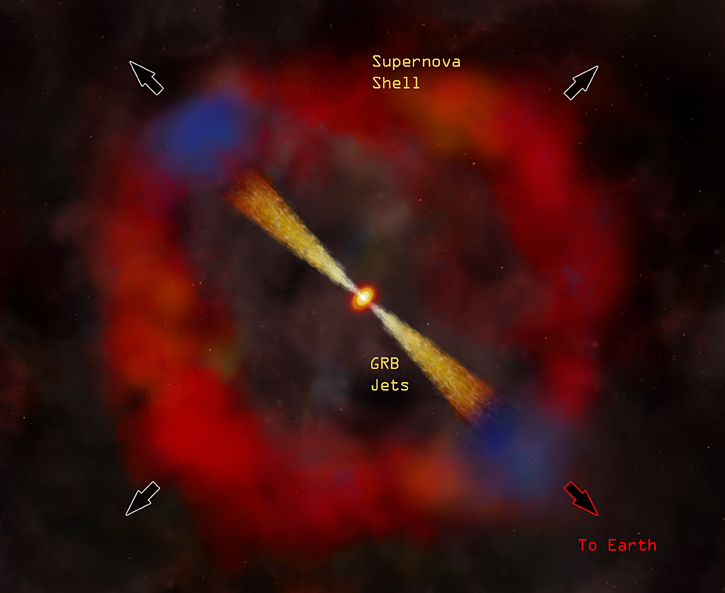
- Event type: Gamma-ray burst
- Constellation: Sagittarius
- Right ascension: 19^{h} 46^{m} 38^{s}
- Declination: −19° 35′ 16″
- Redshift: 1.255
- Other designations: GRB 020813, GRB 020813A
- Related media on Commons

GRB 020813 was a gamma-ray burst (GRB) that was detected on 13 August 2002 at 02:44 UTC. A gamma-ray burst is a highly luminous flash associated with an explosion in a distant galaxy and producing gamma rays, the most energetic form of electromagnetic radiation, and often followed by a longer-lived "afterglow" emitted at longer wavelengths (X-ray, ultraviolet, optical, infrared, and radio).

== Observations ==
GRB 020813 was detected on 13 August 2002 02:44 UTC by multiple instruments on the High Energy Transient Explorer. The burst lasted approximately 125 seconds. The initial position was estimated to be at a right ascension of 19^{h} 46^{m} 38^{s} and a declination of −19° 35′ 16″. In less than two hours after the burst had been detected, optical observations of the region were made with the Katzman Automatic Imaging Telescope which reveal the burst's optical afterglow. In the days following the event, observations were made by the Chandra X-ray Observatory, which detected a fading X-ray afterglow. The redshift for this event was approximately z = 1.254.

== Supernova relation ==
Previous to this burst, there had not yet been any concrete evidence linking gamma-ray bursts to supernovae, though it had long been hypothesized that the two phenomena were results of the same type of event. The spectrum of GRB 011211 was reported to include emission lines associated with the chemical elements magnesium, silicon, sulphur, argon, and calcium, which supported the theory that gamma-ray bursts are preceded by highly massive stars undergoing a supernova collapse. However, these results were considered statistically insignificant and somewhat controversial due to the low resolution of the instruments used. The spectrum of GRB 020813 was also found to display emission lines of elements associated with supernovae, in this case sulphur and silicon. This evidence confirmed the connection between supernovae and gamma-ray bursts.
