= GRB 980425 =

Gamma ray burst that provided the first direct evidence of supernova-GRB relation

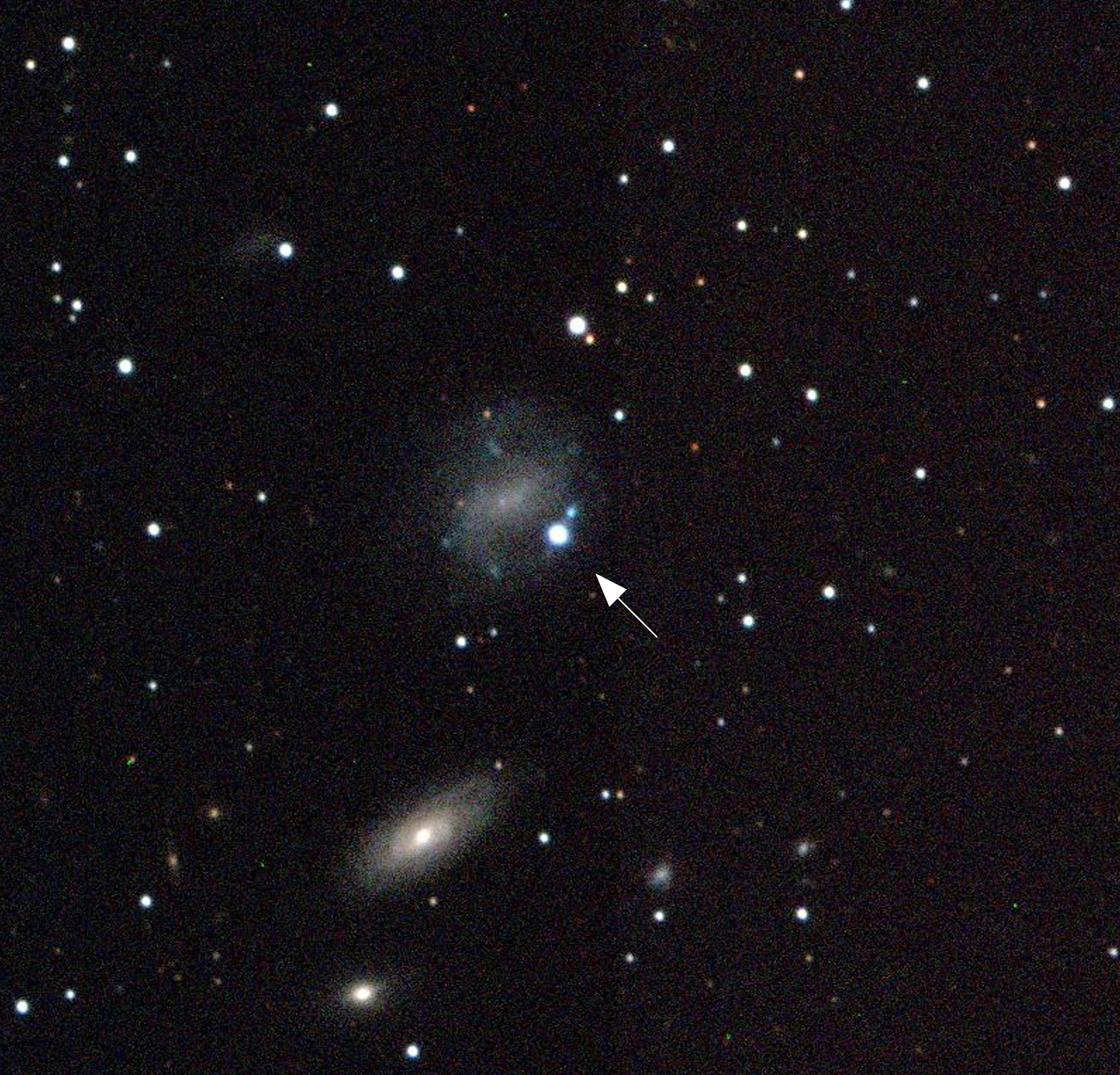
- Arrow points to the gamma ray burst, the galaxy which it is located in is named ESO 184-G82
- Event type: Gamma-ray burst
- Constellation: Telescopium
- Right ascension: 19^{h} 35^{m} 03.17^{s}
- Declination: −52° 50 46.1′
- Epoch: J2000
- Distance: 130 million light years
- Other designations: GRB 980425
- Related media on Commons

GRB 980425 was a gamma-ray burst (GRB) that was detected on 25 April 1998 at 21:49 UTC. GRB 980425 occurred at approximately the same time as SN 1998bw, providing the first evidence that gamma-ray bursts and supernovae are related. It occurred at a distance of 40 megaparsecs (130,000,000 ly) from Earth in the spiral arms of the galaxy ESO 184-G82 and remains the closest GRB yet observed.

== Observations ==
GRB 980425 was first detected by the Gamma-Ray Burst Monitor onboard BeppoSAX on 25 April 1998 at 21:49 UTC. The burst lasted approximately 30 seconds and had a single peak in its light curve. The Narrow Field Instruments (NFIs) onboard BeppoSAX began making observations of the region approximately 10 hours after the burst was detected. The NFIs detected two previously unknown x-ray sources—one at α = 19^{h} 35^{m} 04^{s}, δ = −52° 48′ 33″, and the other at α = 19^{h} 35^{m} 21^{s}, δ = −52° 52′ 19″. In the days that followed the burst, a variable object was detected in the original BeppoSAX error box that was not coincident with either of the two X-ray sources. The object's light curve implied that it might be a supernova.

== Supernova relation ==
A search for the burst's radio afterglow resulted in one object that was coincident with the previously discovered supernova candidate, giving early credence to the idea that SN 1998bw and GRB 980425 were related. This was the first evidence of a physical relationship between gamma-ray bursts and supernovae. Evidence for this relationship and the details thereof continues to develop in the years since this breakthrough. Analyses of previously discovered bursts, such as GRB 970228 and GRB 980326, showed that they may have also been affected by supernovae.
