= GRB 130427A =

Gamma-ray burst

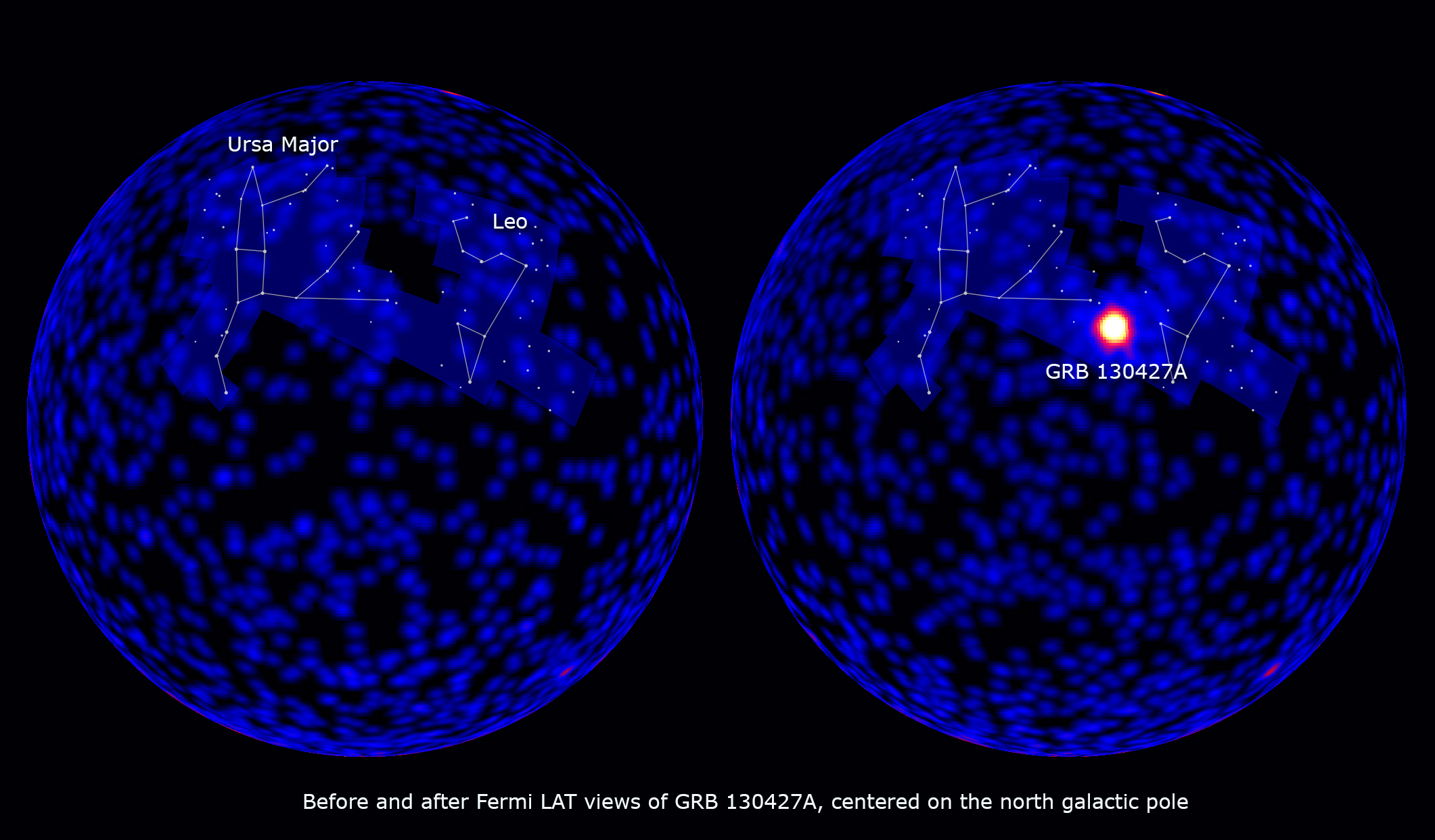
- Before and after in 100+ MeV light
- Event type: Gamma-ray burst
- SNIc
- Date: c. 3.6 billion years ago (detected 27 April 2013)
- Instrument: Fermi
- Constellation: Leo
- Distance: c. 3.6 billion ly
- Other designations: GRB 130427A, CRTS CSS130502 J113233+274156, SN 2013cq, Fermi bn130427324
- Related media on Commons

GRB 130427A was a record-setting gamma-ray burst, discovered starting on April 27, 2013. This GRB was associated to SN 2013cq, of which the appearance of optical signal was predicted on May 2, 2013 and detected on May 13, 2013. The Fermi space observatory detected a gamma-ray with an energy of at least 94 billion electron volts. It was simultaneously detected by the Burst Alert Telescope aboard the Swift telescope and was the brightest burst Swift had ever detected. It was the closest 5% of GRBs, at about 3.6 billion light-years away, and was comparatively long-lasting.

Fermi's Large Area Telescope (LAT) recorded one gamma ray with an energy of at least 94 billion electron volts (GeV), or some 35 billion times the energy of visible light, and about three times greater than the LAT's previous record. The GeV emission from the burst lasted for hours, and it remained detectable by the LAT for the better part of a day, setting a new record for the longest gamma-ray emission from a GRB.

— NASA

The Swift space observatory also observed the burst, quickly determining its location. The X-ray afterglow of the burst was so bright that Swift was able to observe it for the next six months.

The emission was also detected using radio, infrared and visible radiation from ground-based telescopes using the sky location from Swift. The burst was observed with a 350mm optical telescope and its brightness measured. The visible apparent magnitude decreased from 13 to 15.5 over a three-hour period starting at 8:05:12 UTC 27 April 2013. The Catalina Real-time Transient Survey also detected the burst optically, independent of the alert. It was designated as CSS130502:113233+274156. It was found at right ascension 11:32:32.90, and declination +27:41:56.5 (J2000). The SDSS catalogue shows a galaxy (SDSS J113232.84+274155.4) almost coincident with this position at magnitude r=21.26 but with no SDSS spectrum obtained.
