= X-ray flash (astronomy) =

Transient emission of X-rays originating in a distant galaxy

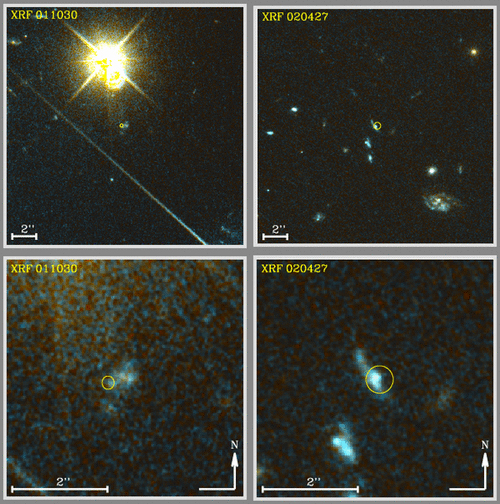
Multiple images of X-ray flashes: XRF 011030 and XRF 020427

In astronomy, an X-ray flash is a transient emission of X-rays originating in a distant galaxy, probably caused by a hypernova. They have been observed to last 90 to 200 seconds.

Nearly all hypernovae are detected via (higher-energy) gamma-ray photons, at distances too great for any associated X-ray emissions from them to be observed; nevertheless, the two main theories of the nature of an X-ray flash each assume that a hypernova is involved:

- One theory assumes that an X-ray-flash hypernova does not differ inherently from gamma-ray-emitting hypernovae, but rather in the orientation, relative to the line of sight to the observer, of the narrow beam of gamma radiation from the hypernova. That is, gamma rays are assumed to be emitted, but in each case in a direction away from our instruments for observing them. Thus the only initially observable phenomenon is lower-energy x-rays emitted in a beam that diverges more than the gamma-ray beam does.
- A competing "dirty fireball" theory suggests that an X-ray flash comes from a hypernova that uses much of the available energy in expelling an unusually large amount of baryonic matter, thus limiting the energy available for electromagnetic radiation, and emitting a much "cooler" spectrum rich in X-rays and very poor in gamma rays.
