= Gamma-ray burst =

Flash of gamma rays from a distant galaxy

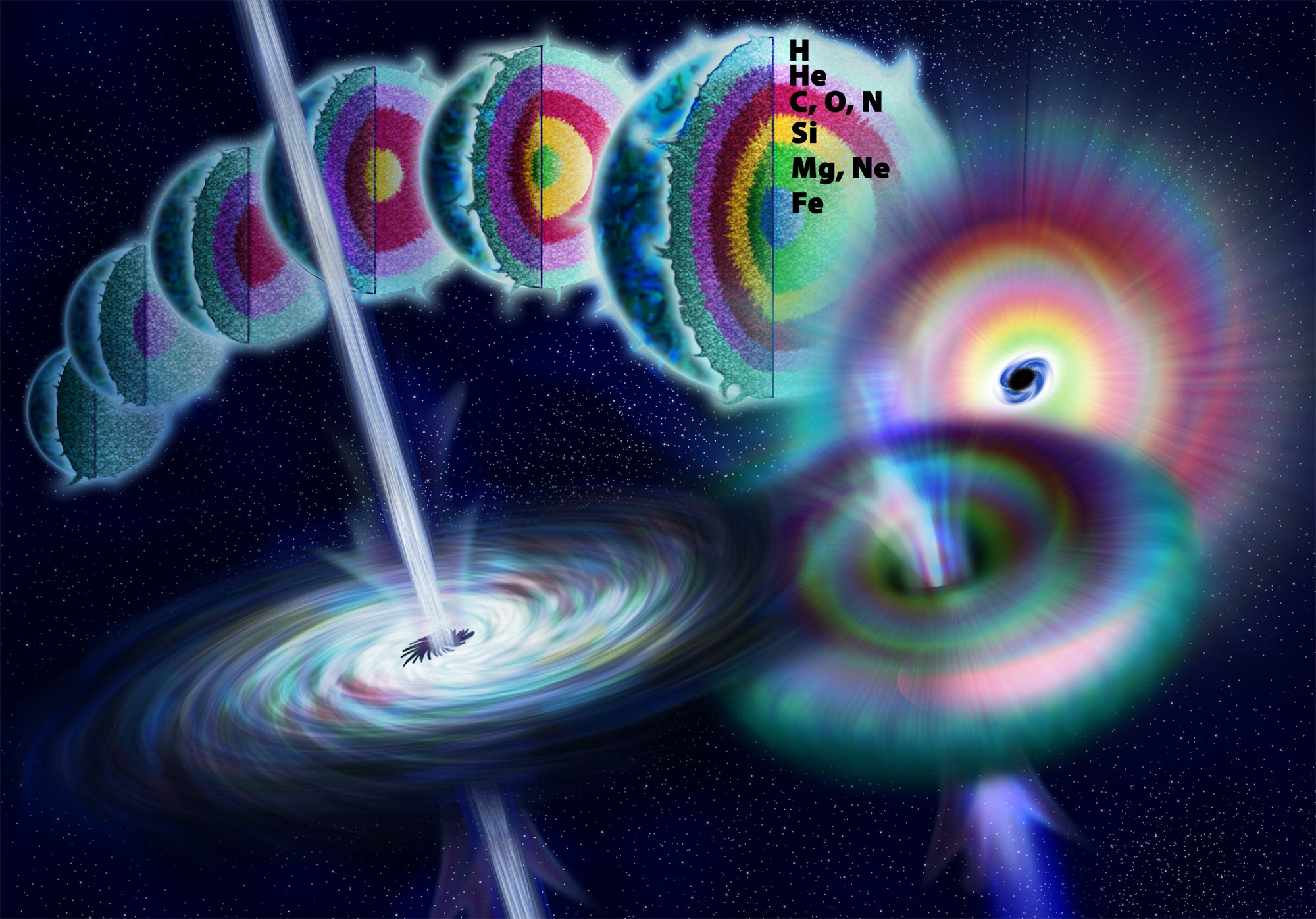
Artist's illustration showing the life of a massive star: Nuclear fusion converts lighter elements into heavier ones; when fusion no longer generates enough pressure to counteract gravity, the star collapses into a black hole. During this collapse, energy may be released as a momentary burst of gamma-rays aligned to the axis of rotation.

In gamma-ray astronomy, gamma-ray bursts (GRBs) are extremely energetic events occurring in distant galaxies that represent the brightest and most powerful class of explosion in the Universe. These extreme electromagnetic emissions are second only to the Big Bang as the most energetic and luminous phenomena known. Gamma-ray bursts can last from a few milliseconds to several hours. After the initial flash of gamma rays, a longer-lived afterglow is emitted, usually in the longer wavelengths of X-ray, ultraviolet, optical, infrared, microwave or radio frequencies.

The intense radiation of most observed GRBs is thought to be released during a supernova or superluminous supernova as a high-mass star implodes to form a neutron star or a black hole. Short-duration (sGRB) events are a subclass of GRB signals that originate from the cataclysmic merger of binary neutron stars.

The sources of most GRB are billions of light years away from Earth, implying that the explosions are both extremely energetic (a typical burst releases as much energy in a few seconds as the Sun will in its entire 10-billion-year lifetime) and extremely rare (a few per galaxy per million years). All GRBs in recorded history have originated from outside the Milky Way galaxy, although a related class of phenomena, soft gamma repeaters, are associated with magnetars within our galaxy. A gamma-ray burst in the Milky Way pointed directly at Earth would likely sterilize the planet or cause a mass extinction. The Late Ordovician mass extinction has been hypothesised by some researchers to have occurred as a result of such a gamma-ray burst.

GRB signals were first detected in 1967 by the Vela satellites, which were designed to detect covert nuclear weapons tests; after an "exhaustive" period of analysis, this was published as academic research in 1973. Following their discovery, hundreds of theoretical models were proposed to explain these bursts, such as collisions between comets and neutron stars. Little information was available to verify these models until the 1997 detection of the first X-ray and optical afterglows and direct measurement of their redshifts using optical spectroscopy, and thus their distances and energy outputs. These discoveries—and subsequent studies of the galaxies and supernovae associated with the bursts—clarified the distance and luminosity of GRBs, definitively placing them in distant galaxies.

== History ==
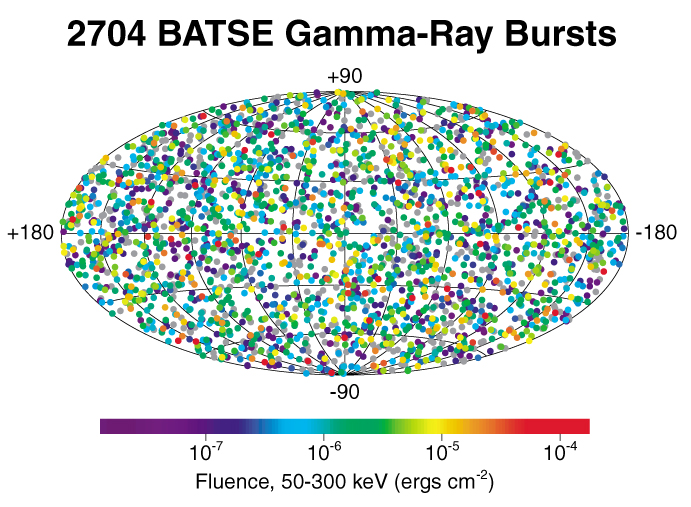
Positions on the sky of all gamma-ray bursts detected during the BATSE mission. The distribution is isotropic, with no concentration towards the plane of the Milky Way, which runs horizontally through the center of the image.

Gamma-ray bursts were first observed in the late 1960s by the U.S. Vela satellites, which were built to detect gamma radiation pulses emitted by nuclear weapons tested in space. The United States suspected that the Soviet Union might attempt to conduct secret nuclear tests after signing the Nuclear Test Ban Treaty in 1963. On July 2, 1967, at 14:19 UTC, the Vela 4 and Vela 3 satellites detected a flash of gamma radiation unlike any known nuclear weapons signature. Uncertain what had happened but not considering the matter particularly urgent, the team at the Los Alamos National Laboratory, led by Ray Klebesadel, filed the data away for investigation. As additional Vela satellites were launched with better instruments, the Los Alamos team continued to find inexplicable gamma-ray bursts in their data. By analyzing the different arrival times of the bursts as detected by different satellites, the team was able to determine rough estimates for the sky positions of 16 bursts and definitively rule out a terrestrial or solar origin. Contrary to popular belief, these data were never classified. After thorough analysis, the findings were published in 1973 as an Astrophysical Journal article entitled "Observations of Gamma-Ray Bursts of Cosmic Origin".

Most early hypotheses of gamma-ray bursts posited nearby sources within the Milky Way Galaxy. From 1991, the Compton Gamma Ray Observatory (CGRO) and its Burst and Transient Source Explorer (BATSE) instrument, an extremely sensitive gamma-ray detector, provided data that showed the distribution of GRBs is isotropic (that is, not biased towards any particular direction in space). If the sources were from within our own galaxy, they would be strongly concentrated in or near the galactic plane. The absence of any such pattern in the case of GRBs provided strong evidence that gamma-ray bursts must come from beyond the Milky Way. Nonetheless, some Milky Way models are still consistent with an isotropic distribution.

=== Counterpart objects as candidate sources ===
For decades after the discovery of GRBs, astronomers searched for a counterpart at other wavelengths: i.e., any astronomical object in positional coincidence with a recently observed burst. Astronomers considered many distinct classes of objects, including white dwarfs, pulsars, supernovae, globular clusters, quasars, Seyfert galaxies, and BL Lac objects. All such searches were unsuccessful, (Note: A notable exception is the 5 March event of 1979, an extremely bright burst that was successfully localized to supernova remnant N49 in the Large Magellanic Cloud. This event is now interpreted as a magnetar giant flare, more related to SGR flares than "true" gamma-ray bursts.) and in a few cases particularly well-localized bursts (those whose positions were determined with what was then a high degree of accuracy) could be clearly shown to have no bright objects of any nature consistent with the position derived from the detecting satellites. This suggested an origin of either very faint stars or extremely distant galaxies. Even the most accurate positions contained numerous faint stars and galaxies, and it was widely agreed that final resolution of the origins of cosmic gamma-ray bursts would require both new satellites and faster communication.

=== Afterglow ===
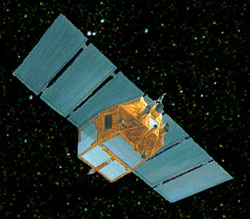
The Italian–Dutch satellite BeppoSAX, launched in April 1996, provided the first accurate positions of gamma-ray bursts, allowing follow-up observations and identification of the sources.

Several models for the origin of gamma-ray bursts postulated that the initial burst of gamma rays should be followed by afterglow: slowly fading emission at longer wavelengths created by collisions between the burst ejecta and interstellar gas. Early searches for this afterglow were unsuccessful, largely because it is difficult to observe a burst's position at longer wavelengths immediately after the initial burst. The breakthrough came in February 1997 when the satellite BeppoSAX detected a gamma-ray burst (GRB 970228 (Note: GRBs are named after the date on which they are discovered: the first two digits being the year, followed by the two-digit month and two-digit day and a letter with the order they were detected during that day. The letter 'A' is appended to the name for the first burst identified, 'B' for the second, and so on. For bursts before the year 2010, this letter was only appended if more than one burst occurred that day.)) and when the X-ray camera was pointed towards the direction from which the burst had originated, it detected fading X-ray emission. The William Herschel Telescope identified a fading optical counterpart 20 hours after the burst. Once the GRB faded, deep imaging was able to identify a faint, distant host galaxy at the location of the GRB as pinpointed by the optical afterglow.

Because of the very faint luminosity of this galaxy, its exact distance was not measured for several years. Well after then, another major breakthrough occurred with the next event registered by BeppoSAX, GRB 970508. This event was localized within four hours of its discovery, allowing research teams to begin making observations much sooner than any previous burst. The spectrum of the object revealed a redshift of z = 0.835, placing the burst at a distance of roughly 6 billion light years from Earth. This was the first accurate determination of the distance to a GRB, and together with the discovery of the host galaxy of 970228 proved that GRBs occur in extremely distant galaxies. Within a few months, the controversy about the distance scale ended: GRBs were extragalactic events originating within faint galaxies at enormous distances. The following year, GRB 980425 was followed within a day by a bright supernova (SN 1998bw), coincident in location, indicating a clear connection between GRBs and the deaths of very massive stars. This burst provided the first strong clue about the nature of the systems that produce GRBs.

=== More recent instruments – launched from 2000 ===
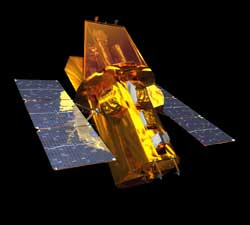
NASA's Swift Spacecraft launched in November 2004

BeppoSAX functioned until 2002 and CGRO (with BATSE) was deorbited in 2000. The revolution in the study of gamma-ray bursts motivated the development of a number of additional instruments designed specifically to explore the nature of GRBs, especially in the earliest moments following the explosion. The first such mission, HETE-2, was launched in 2000 and functioned until 2006, providing most of the major discoveries during this period. One of the most successful space missions to date, Swift, was launched in 2004 and operated until 23 October 2026. Swift was equipped with a very sensitive gamma-ray detector as well as on-board X-ray and optical telescopes, which could be rapidly and automatically slewed to observe afterglow emission following a burst. More recently, the Fermi mission was launched carrying the Gamma-Ray Burst Monitor, which detects bursts at a rate of several hundred per year, some of which are bright enough to be observed at extremely high energies with Fermi's Large Area Telescope. Meanwhile, on the ground, numerous optical telescopes have been built or modified to incorporate robotic control software that responds immediately to signals sent through the Gamma-ray Burst Coordinates Network. This allows the telescopes to rapidly repoint towards a GRB, often within seconds of receiving the signal and while the gamma-ray emission itself is still ongoing.

The Space Variable Objects Monitor is a small X-ray telescope satellite for studying the explosions of massive stars by analysing the resulting gamma-ray bursts, developed by China National Space Administration (CNSA), Chinese Academy of Sciences (CAS) and the French Space Agency (CNES), launched on 22 June 2024 (07:00:00 UTC).

The Taiwan Space Agency is launching a cubesat called The Gamma-ray Transients Monitor to track GRBs and other bright gamma-ray transients with energies ranging from 50 keV to 2 MeV in Q4 2026.

=== Short bursts and other observations ===
New developments since the 2000s include the recognition of short gamma-ray bursts as a separate class (likely from merging neutron stars and not associated with supernovae), the discovery of extended, erratic flaring activity at X-ray wavelengths lasting for many minutes after most GRBs, and the discovery of the most luminous (GRB 080319B) and the former most distant (GRB 090423) emissive sources in the universe. Prior to a flurry of discoveries from the James Webb Space Telescope, the presumptive source of GRB 090429B was the most distant known object in the universe.

In October 2018, astronomers reported that GRB 150101B (detected in 2015) and GW170817, a gravitational wave event detected in 2017 (which has been associated with GRB 170817A, a burst detected 1.7 seconds later), may have been produced by the same mechanism—the merger of two neutron stars. The similarities between the two events, in terms of gamma ray, optical, and x-ray emissions, as well as to the nature of the associated host galaxies, were considered "striking", suggesting the two separate events may both be the result of the merger of neutron stars, and both may be a kilonova, which may be more common in the universe than previously understood, according to the researchers.

The highest energy light observed from a gamma-ray burst was one teraelectronvolt, from GRB 190114C in 2019. Although enormous for such a distant event, this energy is around 3 orders of magnitude lower than the highest energy light observed from closer gamma ray sources within our Milky Way galaxy, for example a 2021 event of 1.4 petaelectronvolts.

== Classification ==
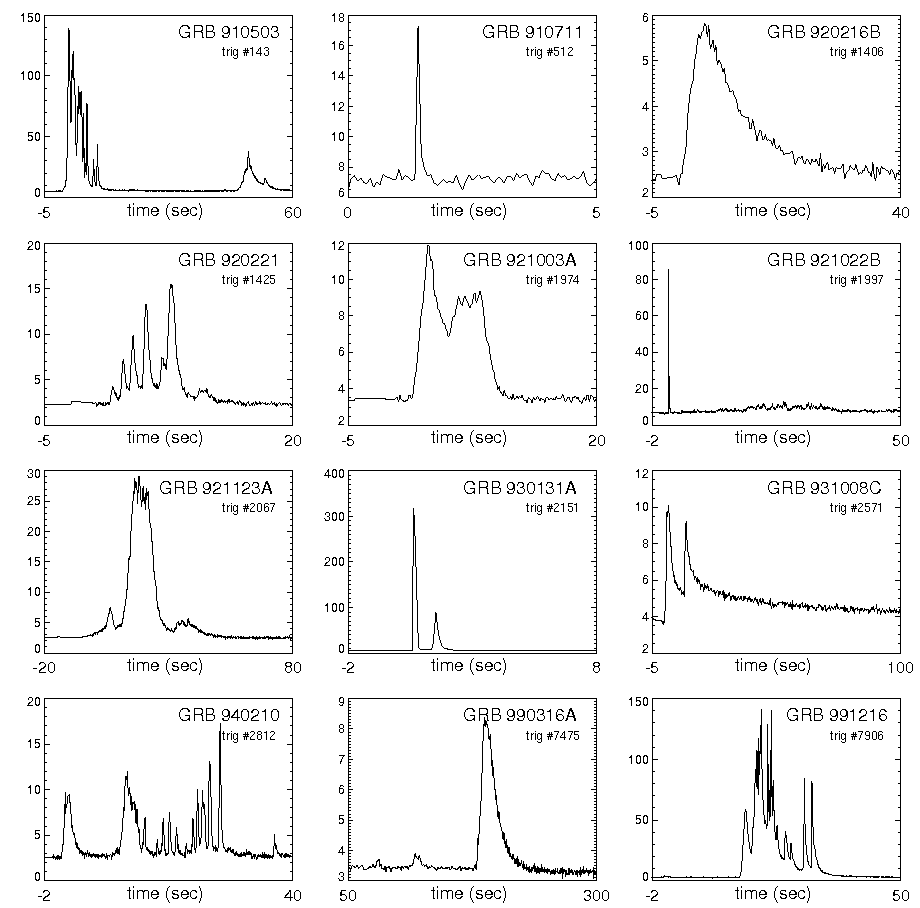
Gamma-ray burst light curves

The light curves of gamma-ray bursts are extremely diverse and complex. No two gamma-ray burst light curves are identical, with large variation observed in almost every property: the duration of observable emission can vary from milliseconds to tens of minutes, there can be a single peak or several individual subpulses, and individual peaks can be symmetric or with fast brightening and very slow fading. Some bursts are preceded by a "precursor" event, a weak burst that is then followed (after seconds to minutes of no emission at all) by the much more intense "true" bursting episode. The light curves of some events have extremely chaotic and complicated profiles with almost no discernible patterns.

Although some light curves can be roughly reproduced using certain simplified models, little progress has been made in understanding the full diversity observed. Many classification schemes have been proposed, but these are often based solely on differences in the appearance of light curves and may not always reflect a true physical difference in the progenitors of the explosions. Plots of the distribution of the observed duration (Note: The duration of a burst is typically measured by T90, the duration of the period that 90 percent of the burst's energy is emitted. Recently some otherwise "short" GRBs have been shown to be followed by a second, much longer emission episode that when included in the burst light curve results in T90 durations of up to several minutes: these events are only short in the literal sense when this component is excluded.) for a large number of gamma-ray bursts show a clear bimodality, suggesting the existence of two separate populations: a "short" population with an average duration of about 0.3 seconds and a "long" population with an average duration of about 30 seconds. Both distributions are very broad with a significant overlap region in which the identity of a given event is not clear from duration alone. Additional classes beyond this two-tiered system have been proposed on both observational and theoretical grounds.

=== Short gamma-ray bursts ===
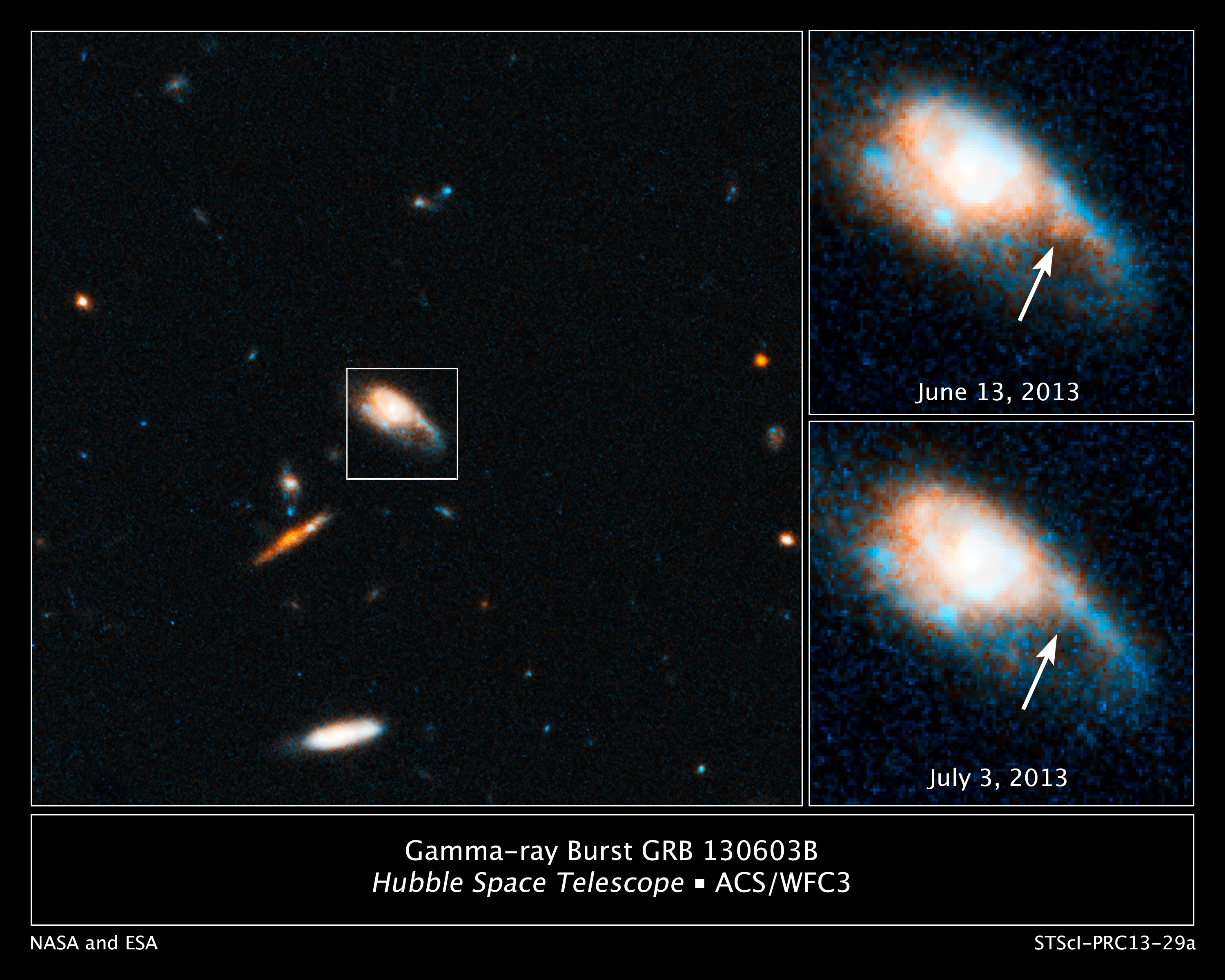
Hubble image of the infrared glow of a kilonova blast

GRB 211106A, one of the most energetic sGRB ever registered, in the first-ever time-lapse movie of a GRB in millimeter-wavelength light, as seen by the Atacama Large Millimeter/submillimeter Array (ALMA)

Events with a duration of less than about two seconds are classified as short gamma-ray bursts (sGRB). These account for about 30% of gamma-ray bursts, but until 2005, no afterglow had been successfully detected from any short event and little was known about their origins. Following this, several dozen short gamma-ray burst afterglows were detected and localized, several of them associated with regions of little or no star formation, such as large elliptical galaxies. This ruled out a link to massive stars, confirming the short events to be physically distinct from long events. In addition, there had been no association with supernovae.

The true nature of these objects was thus initially unknown, but the leading hypothesis was that they originated from the mergers of binary neutron stars or a neutron star with a black hole. Such mergers were hypothesized to produce kilonovae, and evidence for a kilonova associated with short GRB 130603B was reported in 2013. The mean duration of sGRB events of around 200 milliseconds implied (due to causality) that the sources must be of very small physical diameter in stellar terms: less than 0.2 light-seconds (60,000 km or 37,000 miles)—about four times the Earth's diameter. The observation of minutes to hours of X-ray flashes after an sGRB was seen as consistent with small particles of a precursor object like a neutron star initially being swallowed by a black hole in less than two seconds, followed by some hours of lower-energy events as remaining fragments of tidally disrupted neutron star material would remain in orbit, spiraling into the black hole over a longer period of time.

The origin of short gamma-ray bursts in kilonovae was finally conclusively established in 2017, when short GRB 170817A co-occurred with the detection of gravitational wave GW170817, a signal from the merger of two neutron stars.

Unrelated to these cataclysmic origins, short-duration gamma-ray signals are also produced by giant flares from soft gamma repeaters in our own—or nearby—galaxies.

=== Long gamma-ray bursts ===
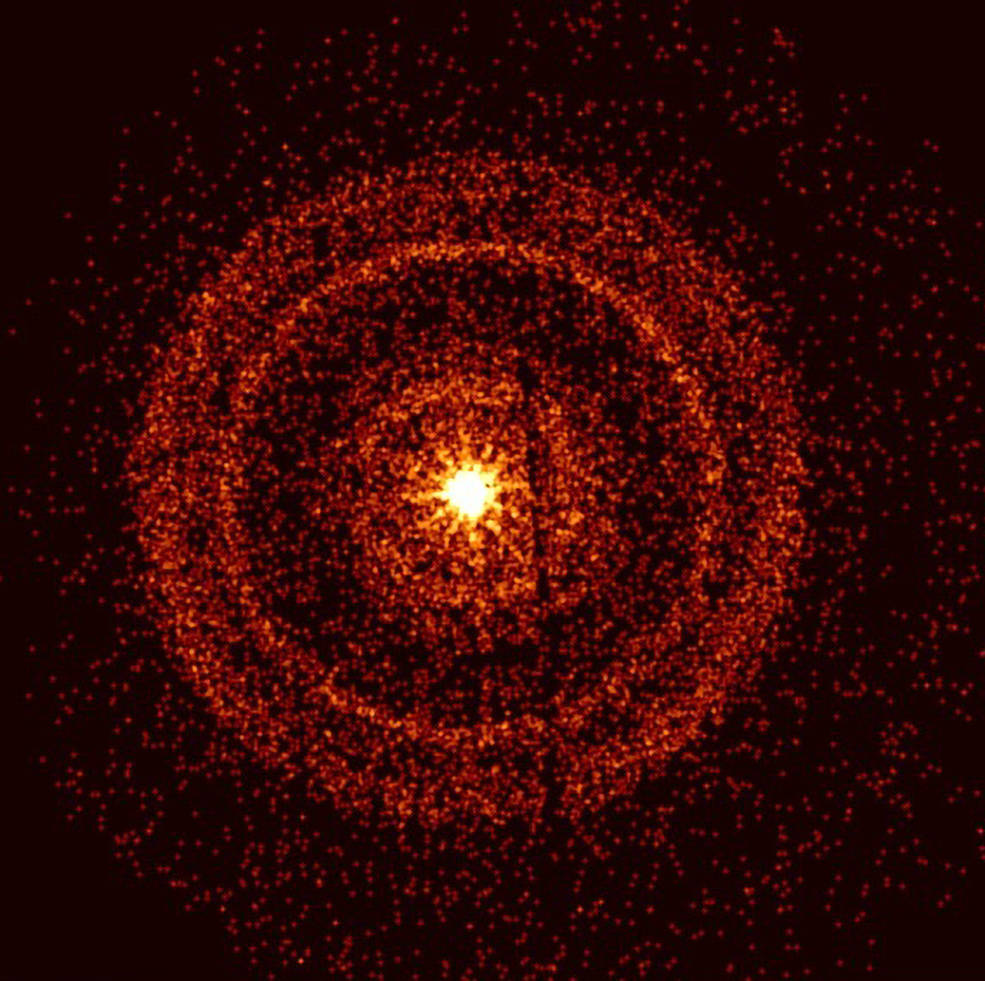
Swift captured the afterglow of GRB 221009A about an hour after it was first detected reaching Earth on October 9, 2022. The bright rings form as a result of X-rays scattered from otherwise unobservable dust layers within our galaxy that lie in the direction of the burst.

Most observed events (70%) have a duration of greater than two seconds and are classified as long gamma-ray bursts. Because these events constitute the majority of the population and because they tend to have the brightest afterglows, they have been observed in much greater detail than their short counterparts. Almost every well-studied long gamma-ray burst has been linked to a galaxy with rapid star formation, and in many cases to a core-collapse supernova as well, unambiguously associating long GRBs with the deaths of massive stars. Long GRB afterglow observations, at high redshift, are also consistent with the GRB having originated in star-forming regions.

In December 2022, astronomers reported the observation of GRB 211211A for 51 seconds, the first evidence of a long GRB likely associated with mergers of "compact binary objects" such as neutron stars or white dwarfs. Following this, GRB 191019A (2019, 64s) and GRB 230307A (2023, 35s) have been argued to signify an emerging class of long GRB that may originate from these types of progenitor events.

=== Ultra-long gamma-ray bursts ===
ulGRB are defined as GRB lasting more than 10,000 seconds, covering the upper range to the limit of the GRB duration distribution. They have been proposed to form a separate class, caused by the collapse of a blue supergiant star, a tidal disruption event or a new-born magnetar. Only a small number have been identified to date, their primary characteristic being their gamma ray emission duration. The most studied ultra-long events include GRB 101225A and GRB 111209A. The low detection rate may be a result of low sensitivity of current detectors to long-duration events, rather than a reflection of their true frequency. A 2013 study, on the other hand, shows that the existing evidence for a separate ultra-long GRB population with a new type of progenitor is inconclusive, and further multi-wavelength observations are needed to draw a firmer conclusion.

== Energetics ==
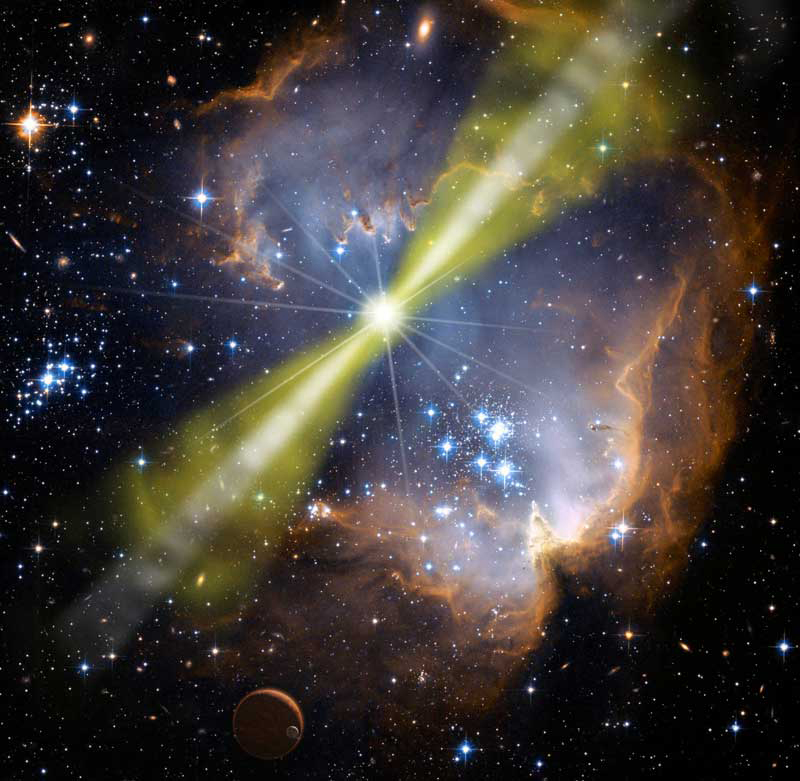
Artist's illustration of a bright gamma-ray burst occurring in a star-forming region. Energy from the explosion is beamed into two narrow, oppositely directed jets.

Gamma-ray bursts are very bright as observed from Earth despite their typically immense distances. An average long GRB has a bolometric flux comparable to a bright star of our galaxy despite a distance of billions of light years (compared to a few tens of light years for most visible stars). Most of this energy is released in gamma rays, although some GRBs have extremely luminous optical counterparts as well. GRB 080319B, for example, was accompanied by an optical counterpart that peaked at a visible magnitude of 5.8, comparable to that of the dimmest naked-eye stars despite the burst's distance of 7.5 billion light years. This combination of brightness and distance implies an extremely energetic source. Assuming the gamma-ray explosion to be spherical, the energy output of GRB 080319B would be within a factor of two of the rest-mass energy of the Sun (the energy that would be released were the Sun to be converted entirely into radiation).

Gamma-ray bursts are thought to be highly focused explosions, with most of the explosion energy collimated into a narrow jet. The jets of gamma-ray bursts are ultrarelativistic, and are the most relativistic jets in the universe. The matter in gamma-ray burst jets may also become superluminal, or faster than the speed of light in the jet medium, with there also being effects of time reversibility. The approximate angular width of the jet (that is, the degree of spread of the beam) can be estimated directly by observing the achromatic "jet breaks" in afterglow light curves: a time after which the slowly decaying afterglow begins to fade rapidly as the jet slows and can no longer beam its radiation as effectively. Observations suggest significant variation in the jet angle from between 2 and 20 degrees.

Because their energy is strongly focused, the gamma rays emitted by most bursts are expected to miss the Earth and never be detected. When a gamma-ray burst is pointed towards Earth, the focusing of its energy along a relatively narrow beam causes the burst to appear much brighter than it would have been were its energy emitted spherically. The total energy of typical gamma-ray bursts has been estimated at 3 × 10^{44} J, – which is larger than the total energy (10^{44} J) of ordinary supernovae (type Ia, Ibc, II), with gamma-ray bursts also being more powerful than the typical supernova. Very bright supernovae have been observed to accompany several of the nearest GRBs. Further support for focusing of the output of GRBs comes from observations of strong asymmetries in the spectra of nearby type Ic supernovae and from radio observations taken long after bursts when their jets are no longer relativistic.

The discovery of GRB 190114C suggests that previous observations may have underestimated the total energy output of GRBs. Measurements indicate that the energy released in very-high-energy gamma rays may be comparable to the combined energy emitted at all lower wavelengths.

Short (time duration) GRBs appear to come from a lower-redshift (i.e. less distant) population and are less luminous than long GRBs. The degree of beaming in short bursts has not been accurately measured, but as a population they are likely less collimated than long GRBs or possibly not collimated at all in some cases.

== Progenitors ==
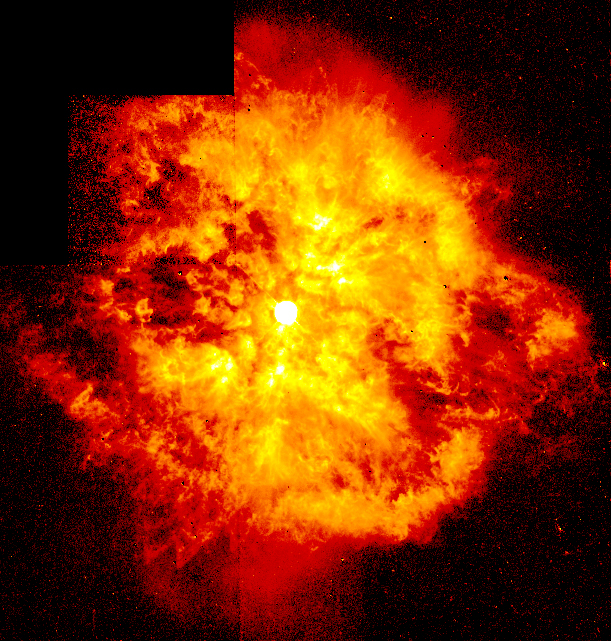
Hubble Space Telescope image of Wolf–Rayet star WR 124 and its surrounding nebula. Wolf–Rayet stars are candidates for being progenitors of long-duration GRBs.

Because of the immense distances of most gamma-ray burst sources from Earth, identification of the progenitors, the systems that produce these explosions, is challenging. The association of some long GRBs with supernovae and the fact that their host galaxies are rapidly star-forming offer very strong evidence that long gamma-ray bursts are associated with massive stars.

The most widely accepted mechanism for the origin of long-duration GRBs is the collapsar. In this model, an extremely massive, low-metallicity, rapidly rotating star in the final stages of its evolution suddenly forms a black hole at the deepest level of its interior, the core. Matter adjacent to what was previously the star's core pours towards the center through the now-vacant space formerly occupied by the stellar core. The spherical collapse of this stellar material interacts with the black hole, around which it swirls into a high-density accretion disk. This has the effect of force-feeding the infant black hole. The rapid ingestion of this material by the black hole drives a pair of relativistic jets out along its rotational axis. These jets then bore through the stellar envelope, eventually breaking through the stellar surface where they radiate enormous quantities of gamma radiation.

Some alternative models replace the black hole with a newly formed magnetar, although most other aspects of the model (the collapse of the core of a massive star and the formation of relativistic jets) are the same.

The closest analogs within the Milky Way galaxy of the stars producing long gamma-ray bursts are likely the Wolf–Rayet stars, extremely hot and massive stars, which have shed most or all of their hydrogen envelope. Eta Carinae, Apep, and WR 104 have been cited as possible future gamma-ray burst progenitors. It is unclear if any star in the Milky Way has the appropriate characteristics to produce a gamma-ray burst.

The massive-star model probably does not explain all types of gamma-ray burst. There is strong evidence that some short-duration gamma-ray bursts occur in systems with no star formation and no massive stars, such as elliptical galaxies and galaxy halos. The favored hypothesis for the origin of most short gamma-ray bursts is the merger of a binary system consisting of two neutron stars. According to this model, the two stars in a binary slowly spiral towards each other because gravitational radiation releases energy until tidal forces suddenly rip the neutron stars apart and they collapse into a single black hole. The infall of matter into the new black hole produces an accretion disk and releases a burst of energy, analogous to the collapsar model. Numerous other models have also been proposed to explain short gamma-ray bursts, including the merger of a neutron star and a black hole, the accretion-induced collapse of a neutron star, or the evaporation of primordial black holes.

An alternative explanation proposed by Friedwardt Winterberg is that in the course of a gravitational collapse and in reaching the event horizon of a black hole, all matter disintegrates into a burst of gamma radiation.

=== Tidal disruption events ===
This class of GRB-like events was first discovered through the detection of Swift J1644+57 (originally classified as GRB 110328A) by the Swift Gamma-Ray Burst Mission on 28 March 2011. This event had a gamma-ray duration of about 2 days, much longer than even ultra-long GRBs, and was detected in many frequencies for months and years after. It occurred at the center of a small elliptical galaxy at redshift 3.8 billion light years away. This event has been accepted as a tidal disruption event (TDE), where a star wanders too close to a supermassive black hole, shredding the star. In the case of Swift J1644+57, an astrophysical jet traveling at near the speed of light was launched, and lasted roughly 1.5 years before turning off.

Since 2011, only 4 jetted TDEs have been discovered, of which 3 were detected in gamma-rays (including Swift J1644+57). It is estimated that just 1% of all TDEs are jetted events.

== Emission mechanisms ==
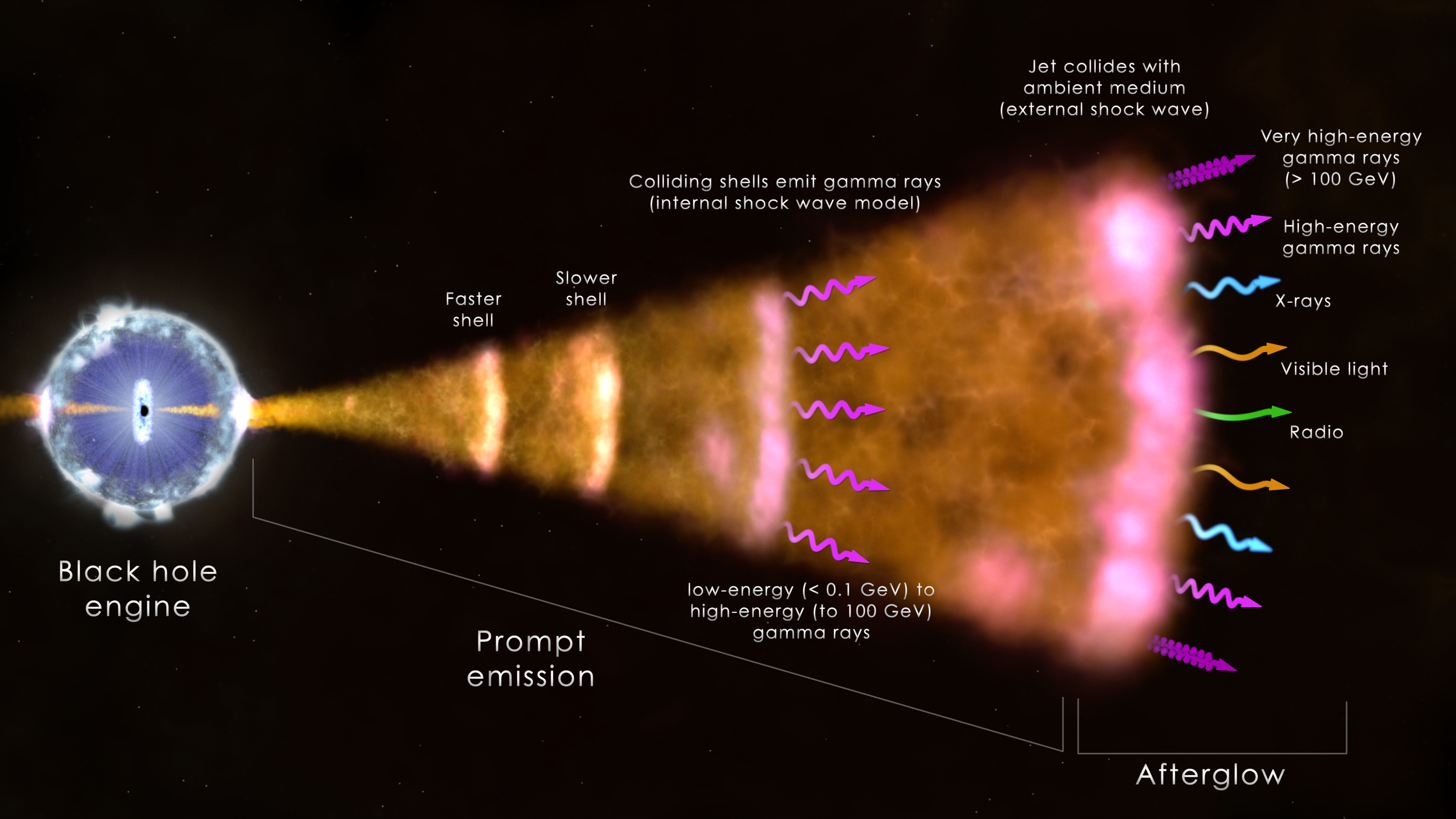
Gamma-ray burst mechanism

The means by which gamma-ray bursts convert energy into radiation remains poorly understood, and as of 2010 there was still no generally accepted model for how this process occurs. Any successful model of GRB emission must explain the physical process for generating gamma-ray emission that matches the observed diversity of light curves, spectra, and other characteristics. Particularly challenging is the need to explain the very high efficiencies that are inferred from some explosions: some gamma-ray bursts may convert as much as half (or more) of the explosion energy into gamma-rays. Early observations of the bright optical counterparts to GRB 990123 and to GRB 080319B, whose optical light curves were extrapolations of the gamma-ray light spectra, have suggested that inverse Compton scattering may be the dominant process in some events. In this model, pre-existing low-energy photons are scattered by relativistic electrons within the explosion, augmenting their energy by a large factor and transforming them into gamma-rays.

The nature of the longer-wavelength afterglow emission (ranging from X-ray through radio) that follows gamma-ray bursts is better understood. Any energy released by the explosion not radiated away in the burst itself takes the form of matter or energy moving outward at nearly the speed of light. As this matter collides with the surrounding interstellar gas, it creates a relativistic shock wave that then propagates forward into interstellar space. A second shock wave, the reverse shock, may propagate back into the ejected matter. Extremely energetic electrons within the shock wave are accelerated by strong local magnetic fields and radiate as synchrotron emission across most of the electromagnetic spectrum. This model has generally been successful in modeling the behavior of many observed afterglows at late times (generally, hours to days after the explosion), although there are difficulties explaining all features of the afterglow very shortly after the gamma-ray burst has occurred.

== Rate of occurrence and potential effects on life ==
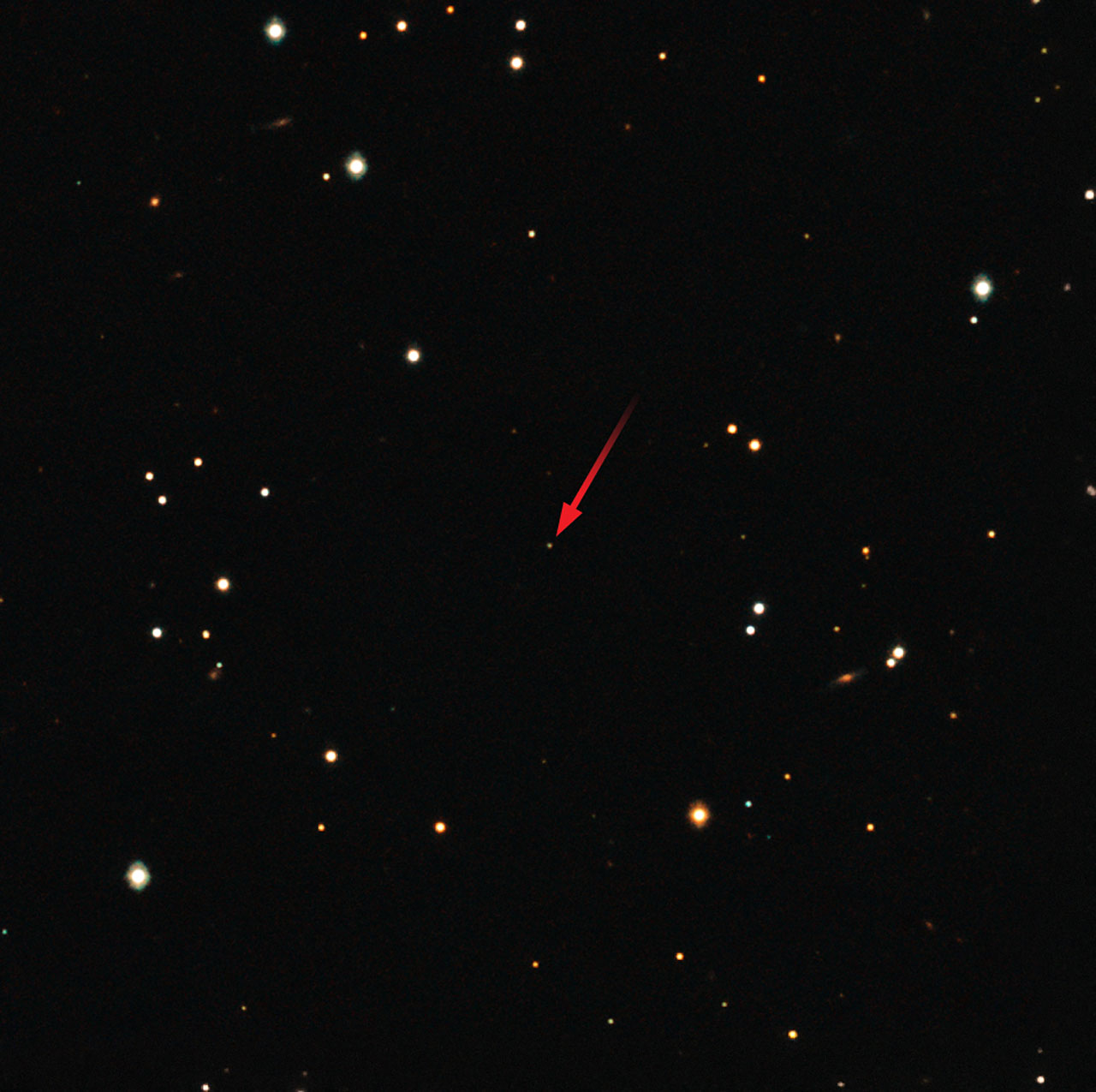
On 27 October 2015, at 22:40 GMT, the NASA/ASI/UKSA Swift satellite discovered its 1000th gamma-ray burst (GRB).

Gamma ray bursts can have harmful or destructive effects on life. Considering the universe as a whole, the safest environments for life similar to that on Earth are the lowest density regions in the outskirts of large galaxies. Our knowledge of galaxy types and their distribution suggests that life as we know it can only exist in about 10% of all galaxies. Furthermore, galaxies with a redshift, z, higher than 0.5 are unsuitable for life as we know it, because of their higher rate of GRBs and their stellar compactness.

All GRBs observed to date have occurred well outside the Milky Way galaxy and have been harmless to Earth. If a GRB were to occur within the Milky Way within 5,000 to 8,000 light-years and its emission were beamed straight towards Earth, the effects could be harmful and potentially devastating for its ecosystems. Currently, orbiting satellites detect on average approximately one GRB per day. The closest observed GRB as of March 2014 was GRB 980425, located 40 megaparsecs (130,000,000 ly) away (z=0.0085) in an SBc-type dwarf galaxy. GRB 980425 was far less energetic than the average GRB and was associated with the Type Ib supernova SN 1998bw.

Estimating the exact rate at which GRBs occur is difficult; for a galaxy of approximately the same size as the Milky Way, estimates of the expected rate (for long-duration GRBs) can range from one burst every 10,000 years, to one burst every 1,000,000 years. Only a small percentage of these would be beamed towards Earth. Estimates of rate of occurrence of short-duration GRBs are even more uncertain because of the unknown degree of collimation, but are probably comparable.

Since GRBs are thought to involve beamed emission along two jets in opposing directions, only planets in the path of these jets would be subjected to the high energy gamma radiation. A GRB could potentially vaporize anything in its beams' paths within a range of around 200 light-years.

Although nearby GRBs hitting Earth with a destructive shower of gamma rays are only hypothetical events, high energy processes across the galaxy have been observed to affect the Earth's atmosphere.

=== Effects on Earth ===
Earth's atmosphere is very effective at absorbing high energy electromagnetic radiation such as x-rays and gamma rays, so these types of radiation would not reach any dangerous levels at the surface during the burst event itself. The immediate effect on life on Earth from a GRB within a few kiloparsecs would only be a short increase in ultraviolet radiation at ground level, lasting from less than a second to tens of seconds. This ultraviolet radiation could potentially reach dangerous levels depending on the exact nature and distance of the burst, but it seems unlikely to be able to cause a global catastrophe for life on Earth.

The long-term effects from a nearby burst are more dangerous. Gamma rays cause chemical reactions in the atmosphere involving oxygen and nitrogen molecules, creating first nitrogen oxide then nitrogen dioxide gas. The nitrogen oxides cause dangerous effects on three levels. First, they deplete ozone, with models showing a possible global reduction of 25–35%, with as much as 75% in certain locations, an effect that would last for years. This reduction is enough to cause a dangerously elevated UV index at the surface. Secondly, the nitrogen oxides cause photochemical smog, which darkens the sky and blocks out parts of the sunlight spectrum. This would affect photosynthesis, but models show only about a 1% reduction of the total sunlight spectrum, lasting a few years. The smog could potentially cause a cooling effect on Earth's climate, however, producing a "cosmic winter" (similar to an impact winter, but without an impact), but only if it occurs simultaneously with a global climate instability. Thirdly, the elevated nitrogen dioxide levels in the atmosphere would wash out and produce acid rain. Nitric acid is toxic to a variety of organisms, including amphibian life, but models predict that it would not reach levels that would cause a serious global effect. The nitrates might in fact be of benefit to some plants.

All in all, a GRB within a few kiloparsecs, with its energy directed towards Earth, will mostly damage life by raising the UV levels during the burst itself and for a few years thereafter. Models show that the destructive effects of this increase can cause up to 16 times the normal levels of DNA damage. It has proved difficult to assess a reliable evaluation of the consequences of this on the terrestrial ecosystem, because of the uncertainty in biological field and laboratory data.

==== Hypothetical effects on Earth in the past ====
There is a very likely chance (but no certainty) that at least one lethal GRB took place during the past 5 billion years close enough to Earth as to significantly damage life. There is a 50% chance that such a lethal GRB took place within two kiloparsecs of Earth during the last 500 million years.

The Ordovician mass extinction 450 million years ago may have been caused by a GRB. Estimates suggest that approximately 20–60% of the total phytoplankton biomass in the Ordovician oceans would have perished in a GRB, because the oceans were mostly oligotrophic and clear. The late Ordovician species of trilobites that spent portions of their lives in the plankton layer near the ocean surface were much harder hit than deep-water dwellers, which tended to remain within quite restricted areas. This is in contrast to the usual pattern of extinction events, wherein species with more widely spread populations typically fare better. A possible explanation is that trilobites remaining in deep water would be more shielded from the increased UV radiation associated with a GRB. Also supportive of this hypothesis is the fact that during the late Ordovician, burrowing bivalve species were less likely to go extinct than bivalves that lived on the surface.

A case has been made that the 774–775 carbon-14 spike was the result of a short GRB, though a very strong solar flare is another possibility.

== GRB candidates in the Milky Way ==
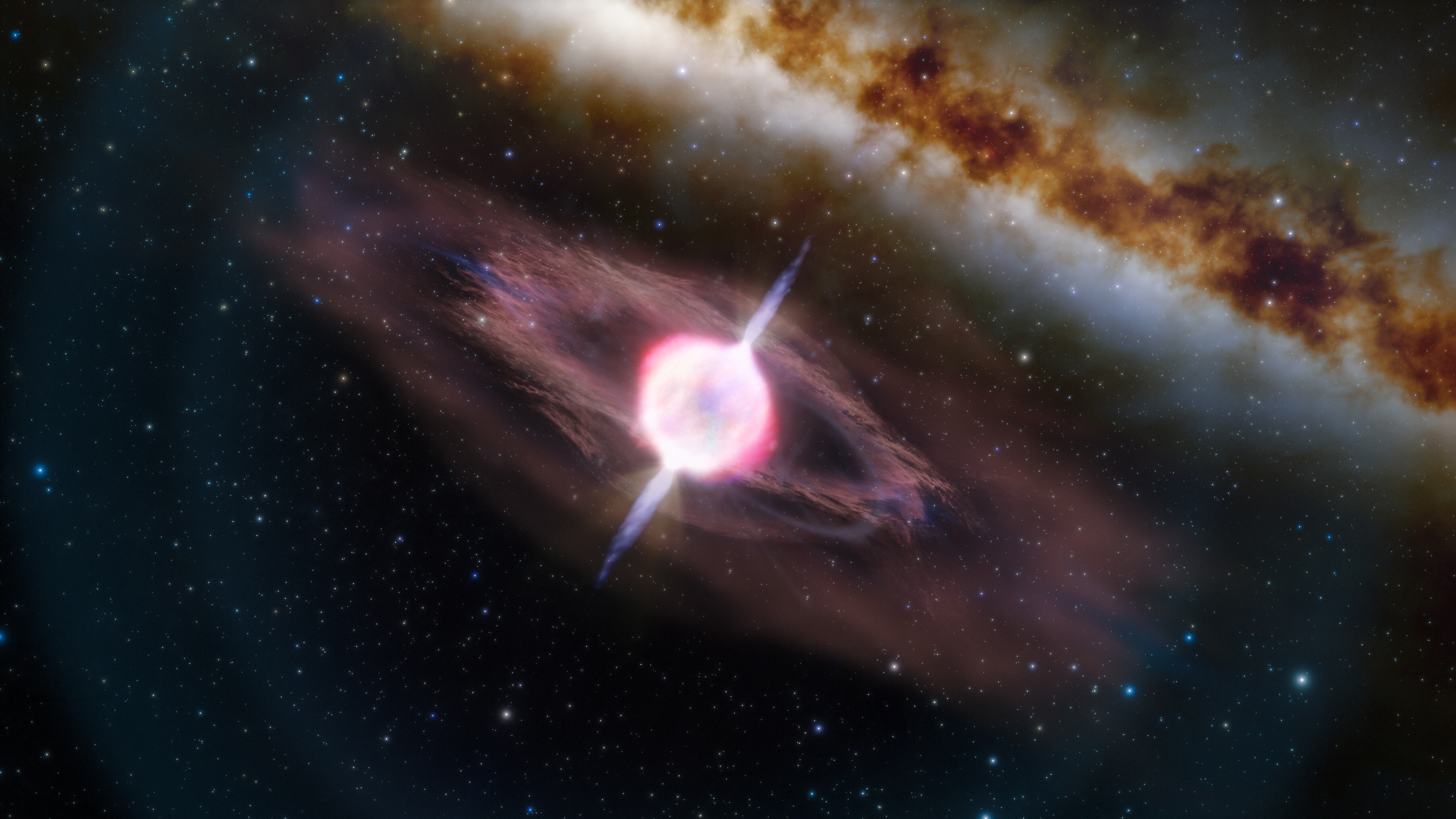
Illustration of a short gamma-ray burst caused by a collapsing star

No gamma-ray bursts from within our own galaxy, the Milky Way, have been observed, and the question of whether one has ever occurred remains unresolved. In light of evolving understanding of gamma-ray bursts and their progenitors, the scientific literature records a growing number of local, past, and future GRB candidates. Long duration GRBs are related to superluminous supernovae, or hypernovae, and most luminous blue variables (LBVs) and rapidly spinning Wolf–Rayet stars are thought to end their life cycles in core-collapse supernovae with an associated long-duration GRB. Knowledge of GRBs, however, is from metal-poor galaxies of former epochs of the universe's evolution, and it is impossible to directly extrapolate to encompass more evolved galaxies and stellar environments with a higher metallicity, such as the Milky Way.

== See also ==
- BOOTES – Network of robotic astronomical observatories
- Fast blue optical transient
- Fast radio burst
- Gamma-ray burst precursor
- Horizons: Exploring the Universe
- List of gamma-ray bursts
  - GRB 020813, GRB 031203, GRB 070714B
  - GRB 080916C, GRB 100621A, GRB 130427A
  - GRB 190114C, GRB 211211A, GRB 221009A
- Relativistic jet – Stream of ionized matter flowing away from a rotating astronomical object
- Soft gamma repeater – Astronomical object which emits bursts of gamma or x-rays at irregular intervals
- Stellar evolution
- Terrestrial gamma-ray flashes
