= List of gamma-ray bursts =

The following is a list of significant gamma-ray bursts (GRBs) listed in chronological order. GRBs are named after the date on which they were detected: the first two numbers correspond to the year, the second two numbers to the month, and the last two numbers to the day.

== Chronological master list of significant GRBs ==
Burst	Position	Redshift	Detected by	Notes
GRB 670702			Vela 4	First GRB detected
GRB 790305b				The first observed SGR megaflare, a specific type of short GRB.
GRB 830801				Until October 2022, the brightest GRB detected (now overtaken by GRB 221009A)
GRB 970228		z = 0.695 (Note: Bloom 2001)	BeppoSAX	First X-ray afterglow, first optical afterglow
GRB 970402	RA 14^{h} 50.1^{m} Dec −69° 20′		BeppoSAX	From an X-ray source never seen before in the constellation Circinus. (Note: Antonelli)
GRB 970508		z = 0.835	BeppoSAX	First redshift, first radio afterglow
GRB 971214		z = 3.4	BATSE	The first GRB at z > 1; the most luminous of the earliest few GRBs.
GRB 980425		z = 0.008 (Note: Tinney 1998)	BATSE	The second closest GRB to date (after GRB 170817A) and the first associated with a supernova.
GRB 990123	R.A. 15^{h} 25^{m} 29^{s} Decl. 44° 45′ 30″ (Note: Odewahn 1999)	z = 1.6	BeppoSAX	First burst observed simultaneously in optical and gamma-rays. Brightest observed afterglow before the launch of Swift.
GRB 991216			BATSE	First burst detected by the Chandra X-ray Observatory
GRB 030329		z = 0.168 (Note: Caldwell 2003)	HETE-2	The closest "classical" long GRB to Earth and the most thoroughly studied afterglow to date.
GRB 050509B		z = 0.225	Swift	First short burst with a detected afterglow and a possible host galaxy (not unique).
GRB 050709		z = 0.161 (Note: Price 2005)	HETE-2	First short burst with a detected optical counterpart.
GRB 050724		z = 0.258 (Note: Berger 2005)	Swift	First short burst with a detected radio, optical, and X-ray counterpart, as well as an unambiguous association with an elliptical galaxy.
GRB 060218		z = 0.0331 (Note: Mirabal 2006)	Swift	First GRB with an accompanying supernova which could be tracked starting immediately after the burst.
GRB 060614	R.A. 21^{h} 23^{m} 27.0^{s} Decl. −53° 02′ 02″	z = 0.125	Swift	Either a long-duration burst in which the presence of a bright supernova is ruled out, or a short-duration burst with extremely long-lasting gamma-ray emission.
GRB 080319B		z = 0.937	Swift	The most (optically) luminous event of any nature observed in the universe to date. By far the brightest optical afterglow of any gamma-ray burst.
GRB 080916C		z = 4.35 (Note: Greiner 2009)	Fermi	Formerly the most energetic gamma-ray burst observed.
GRB 090423	R.A. 09^{h} 55^{m} 33.08^{s} Decl. +18° 08′ 58.9″	z = 8.2	Swift	Remains the record holder for most distant observed object in the universe with spectroscopic confirmation. (Note: Reddy 2009)
GRB 101225A	R.A. 00^{h} 00^{m} 47.51^{s} Decl. +44° 36′ 01.1″	z = 0.33	Swift	28 minutes duration. Also known as the "Christmas burst".
GRB 130427A	R.A. 11^{h} 32^{m} 32.84^{s} Decl. +27° 41′ 56.2″	z = 0.34	Swift	hours duration
GRB 160625B	R.A. 20^{h} 34^{m} 23.25^{s} Decl. +06° 55′ 10.5″	z = 1.406	Fermi; LAT	Extremely bright burst with polarized optical light
GRB 170817A	R.A. 12^{h} 47^{m} Decl. −39° 48′	z = 0.009727	Fermi	Neutron star collision, producing the gravitational wave named GW170817. Closest GRB known to date
GRB 200826A		z=0.7486		A short duration gamma ray burst that lasted for 0.5 seconds.
GRB 211211A		z=0.0785	Swift, Fermi	First long GRB from a binary neutron star merger
GRB 221009A	R.A. 19^{h} 13^{m} 03.48^{s} Decl. 19° 46′ 24.6″	z = 0.151	Swift	One of the closest GRB and was the most energetic and brightest GRB ever recorded, deemed the "B.O.A.T.", or Brightest Of All Time. It had 18 TeV, a record.
GRB 230307A			Fermi	Second only to GRB 221009A in terms of fluence.
GRB 250702B	R.A. 18^{h} 58^{m} 45.565^{s} Decl. −7° 52′ 26.42″	z ≲ 1	Fermi	Longest duration
GRB 260726A	R.A. 23^{h} 47^{m} 42.79^{s} Decl. 52° 52′ 28.92″		SVOM	Three simultaneous detections (alongwith GRB260727A) within 38 minutes (both SVOM and FERMI together)

== Categorisation by Extremes ==
GRB Extremes
Title	GRB	Data	Notes
Least distant	GRB 170817A	z = 0.009727	Higher redshift than GRB 980425, but closer galaxy
Most distant with photometric redshift estimate	GRB 090429B	z = 9.4	
Most distant with spectroscopic redshift estimate	GRB 090423	z = 8.2	
Least Luminous			
Most Luminous	GRB 110918A	z = 0.984	Peak Luminosity (isotropic) is L_{iso} = 4.7 × 10^{47} Watts
Most Energetic	GRB 221009A	18 TeV; z=0.151	It is the most energetic gamma-ray burst ever recorded. It has been deemed to be the "B.O.A.T.", or Brightest Of All Time. It had the highest fluence and peak flux ever identified, by a large margin. It also holds the record for highest energy burst recorded if released isotropically, beating GRB 080916C. It may have released a photon at 251 TeV.
Longest duration	GRB 250702B	Duration = ca. 1 day	
Shortest duration	GRB 820405	Duration = 12 ms	
Most distant naked-eye brightness GRB	GRB 080319B	Apparent magnitude: 5.3 z=0.937	

== Categorisation by Firsts ==
GRB Firsts
Title	GRB	Date	Data	Notes
First GRB detected	GRB 670702	1967 July 2		
First GRB identified	GRB 781104	1978 November 4		Venera-11, Venera-12, Prognoz-7, ISEE-3, Pioneer Venus Orbiter, Vela
First long duration GRB discovered				
First short duration GRB discovered				
First hard spectrum GRB discovered				
First soft spectrum GRB discovered				
First GRB whose distance was determined	GRB 970508		z=0.835	
First GRB discovered with a radio afterglow	GRB 970508			
First GRB discovered with an optical afterglow	GRB 970228	February 28, 1997 02:58 UTC		
First GRB discovered with an X-ray afterglow	GRB 780506			
First Short GRB discovered with millimeter afterglow	GRB 211106A	2021 November 6 04:37:31.2 UT	0.7<z<1.4	One of the widest and most energetic SGRB jets known to date. Associated with a neutron star merger.
First GRB linked to a supernova	GRB 980425	25 April 1998 21:49 UTC	SN 1998bw	GRB 030329 definitively linked SNe with GRBs, being associated with the hypernova SN 2003dh
First GRB of naked-eye brightness	GRB 080319B	2008 March 19 06:12 UTC	Apparent magnitude: 5.7	The first GRB bright enough to be visible to amateur astronomers with low powered scopes was GRB 990123 at magnitude 9
First GRB with associated Gravitational wave detection	GRB 170817A	2017 August 17	GW170817	
First GRB with tera-electron volt radiation from inverse Compton emission.	GRB 190114C	2019 January 14 20:57:03 UT	z=0.4245; magnitude=15.60est	"light detected from the object had the highest energy ever observed: 1 Tera electron volt (TeV) -- about one trillion times as much energy per photon as visible light"; "the brightest light ever seen from Earth [to date]"; "this detection is considered a milestone in high-energy astrophysics". Its light energy was then overtaken by GRB 190829A with 3.3 TeV and then GRB 221009A with 18 TeV.

== Categorisation by Most-distant ==
GRBs z>6 (GRBs z>6 are used to explore the reionization era )
GRB	Distance	Notes
GRB 090429B	z=9.4	(photometric redshift)
GRB 090423	z=8.2	
GRB 080913	z=6.7	
GRB 060116	z=6.60	The high foreground extinction for this event makes this photometric redshift estimate very uncertain.
GRB 140515A	z=6.33	
GRB 050904	z=6.295	

Most Distant GRB Titleholders
GRB	Date	Distance	Notes
GRB 090429B	May 2011 —	z=9.4	The GRB was observed in 2009, however its distance was not announced until 2011.
GRB 090423	April 2009 — May 2011	z=8.2	This was the first GRB to become the most distant object in the universe.
GRB 080913	September 2008 — April 2009	z=6.7	
GRB 050904	September 2005 — September 2008	z=6.29	
GRB 000131	January 2000 — September 2005	z=4.50	
GRB 971214	December 1997 — January 2000	z=3.42	
GRB 970508	May 1997 — December 1997	z=0.835	First GRB with its distance determined

== See also ==
- Lists of astronomical objects
