= Ultra-Fast Flash Observatory Pathfinder =

Observatory

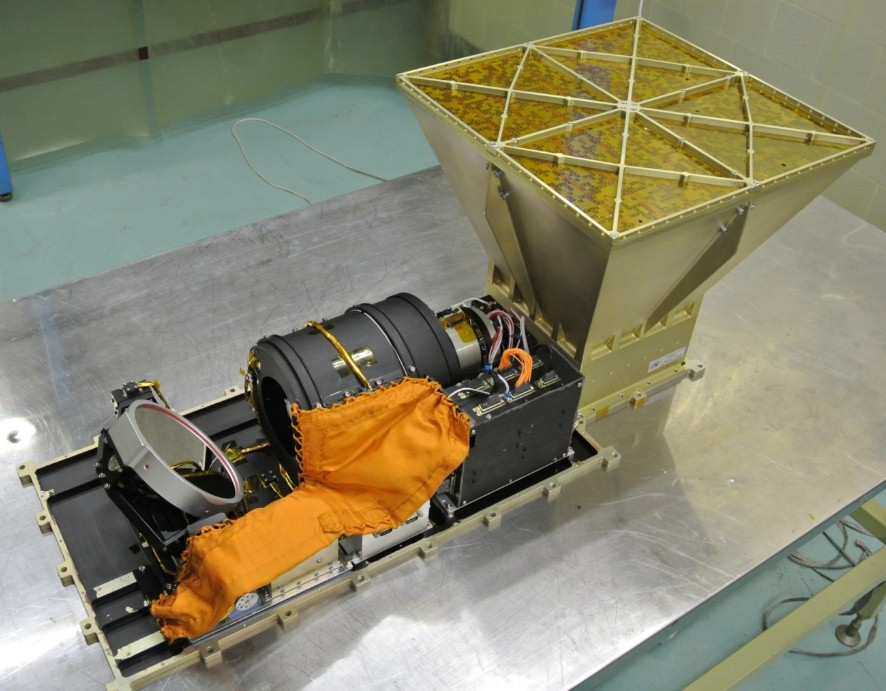
UFFO Pathfinder (flight model)

The Ultra-Fast Flash Observatory (UFFO) Pathfinder is a Russian space observatory measuring prompt emission of gamma-ray bursts (GRB) both in optical/UV and in X-ray range down to sub-second timescales for the first time. Instead of turning the whole satellite towards GRB location like the Swift Gamma-Ray Burst Mission (which takes about 100 seconds), UFFO employs a slewing mirror telescope approach – the optical path of the telescope is changed by rotation of motorized mirror within ~1 second after burst was detected.

UFFO was launched April 28, 2016 on board the Mikhailo Lomonosov satellite during the first launch from the new Russian Vostochny Cosmodrome.

== Instruments ==
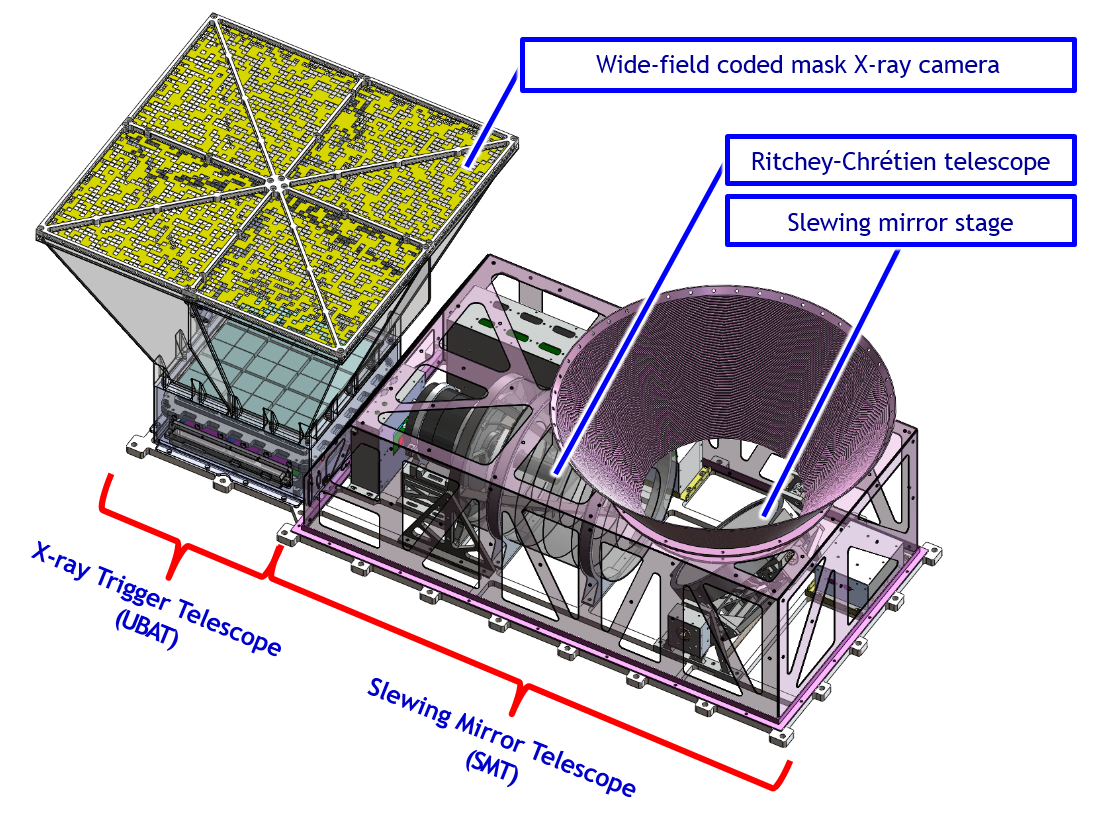
UFFO Pathfinder (3D model)

=== UFFO Burst Alert & Trigger telescope (UBAT) ===
UBAT is a wide-field coded mask X-ray camera. It has a 191 cm^{2} detecting area, 90.2°×90.2° field of view and is sensitive in the 15-150 keV photon energy range. UBAT is able to localize bursts with an accuracy of 7σ to a region 10 arcmin across in less than one second and is used as a trigger source for the SMT.

=== Slewing Mirror Telescope (SMT) ===
The SMT is a key component of the UFFO - a telescope designed for fast observation of prompt optical/UV emissions of GRB. SMT consist of the slewing mirror stage, the Ritchey–Chrétien telescope and image processing / motor controlling electronics. The SMT has 100 mm diameter aperture (although it is often mistakenly reported to have 20 cm aperture on various web pages), 17×17 arcmin field of view, 4 arcsec angular resolution and is able to register single photons in the 200 nm - 650 nm wavelength range due to using an ICCD as a detector.

=== UFFO Data Acquisition (UDAQ) ===
The UDAQ is in charge of UFFO control by execution of an on-board command list. It may also implement commands from the ground. UDAQ collects data both from UBAT and SMT, storing it in several NOR flash memories and transferring to the spacecraft. It is also in charge of temperature / power / light control (the last one is especially important, because the sensitive detectors of the SMT and UBAT must be powered off on the day side of the orbit). As in the UBAT and SMT, the UDAQ's electronics is based on a FPGA rather than on a CPU like most other satellites.

== Mission goals ==
The objective of the UFFO is probing the early optical rise of GRBs for the first time. The first 100 seconds of a GRB optical/UV emission, which has hardly been studied up to now. It takes a long time for ground telescopes to focus on the relevant part of the sky after a GRB is registered. In particular, this may help to understand the evolution of the universe at a high redshift z>10.

== See also ==
- GRB 160625B
- List of gamma ray bursts
