= GRB 050904 =

Gamma-ray burst source

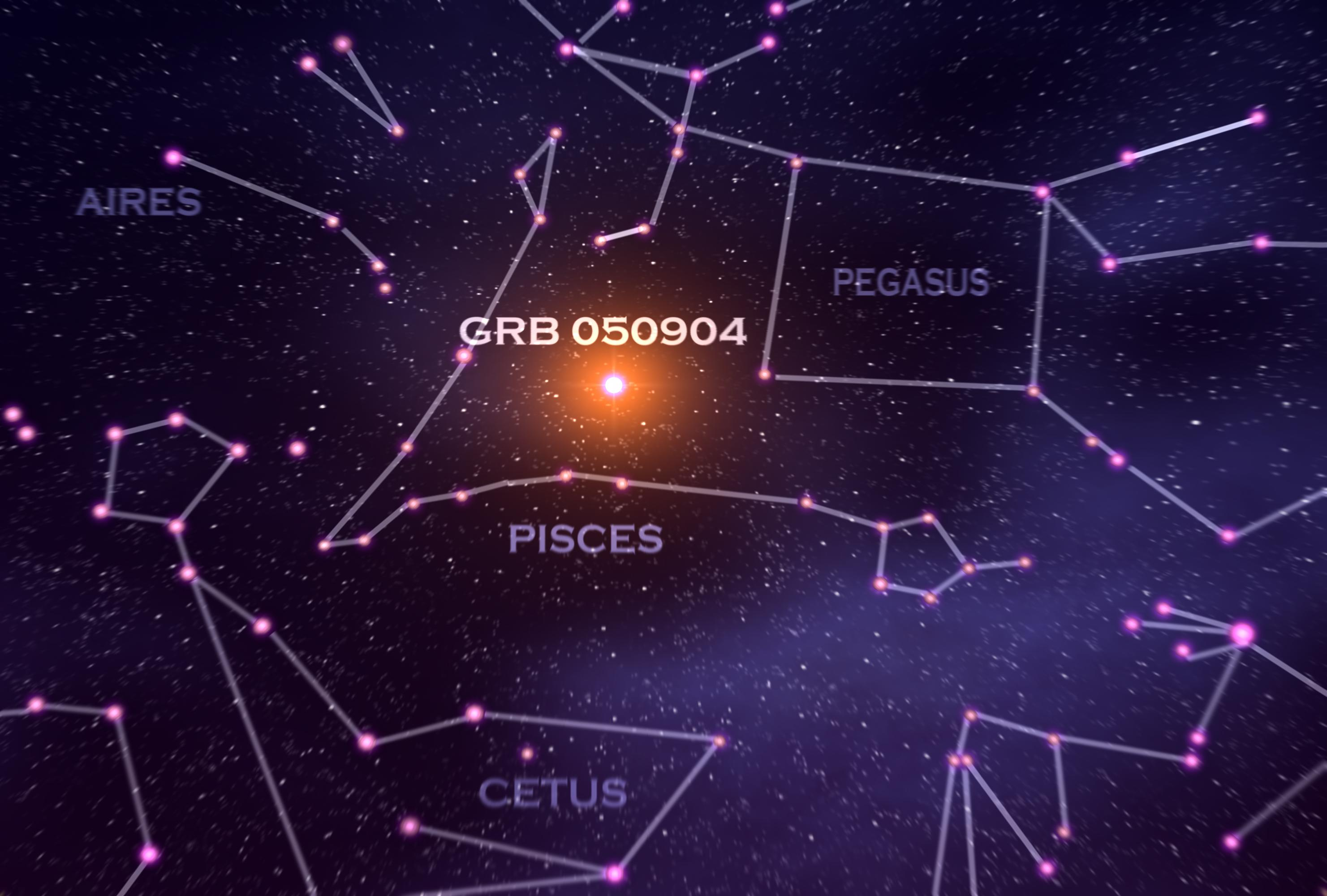
- Event type: Gamma-ray burst
- Constellation: Pisces
- Redshift: 6.295 ±0.002
- Other designations: GRB 050904
- Related media on Commons

GRB 050904 is one of the most distant events ever observed, as of 2005. This gamma ray burst (GRB) occurred in the constellation Pisces. The bright γ-ray flash, lasting about 200 seconds, was detected on September 4, 2005, by the Swift Gamma-Ray Burst Mission. The GRB has a redshift of z=6.295. Such a high redshift means that the burst happened nearly 13 billion years ago. Therefore, the GRB exploded when the Universe was an infant (890 million years old according to the most recent estimates), about 6% of its current age. By comparison, the most distant galaxy and the most distant quasar ever observed, as of 2005, had a redshift of 6.96 and 6.43, respectively.

Three different groups of researchers, led by Giancarlo Cusumano, Joshua Haislip, and Nobuyuki Kawai respectively, carried out the investigation of the phenomenon and presented their results in Nature magazine on March 9, 2006.

== See also ==
- GRB 080913
- GRB 090423

| Preceded by GRB 000131 | Most distant gamma-ray burst 2005 — 2008 | Succeeded by GRB 080913 |
