= GRB 160625B =

Very energetic and bright gamma ray burst

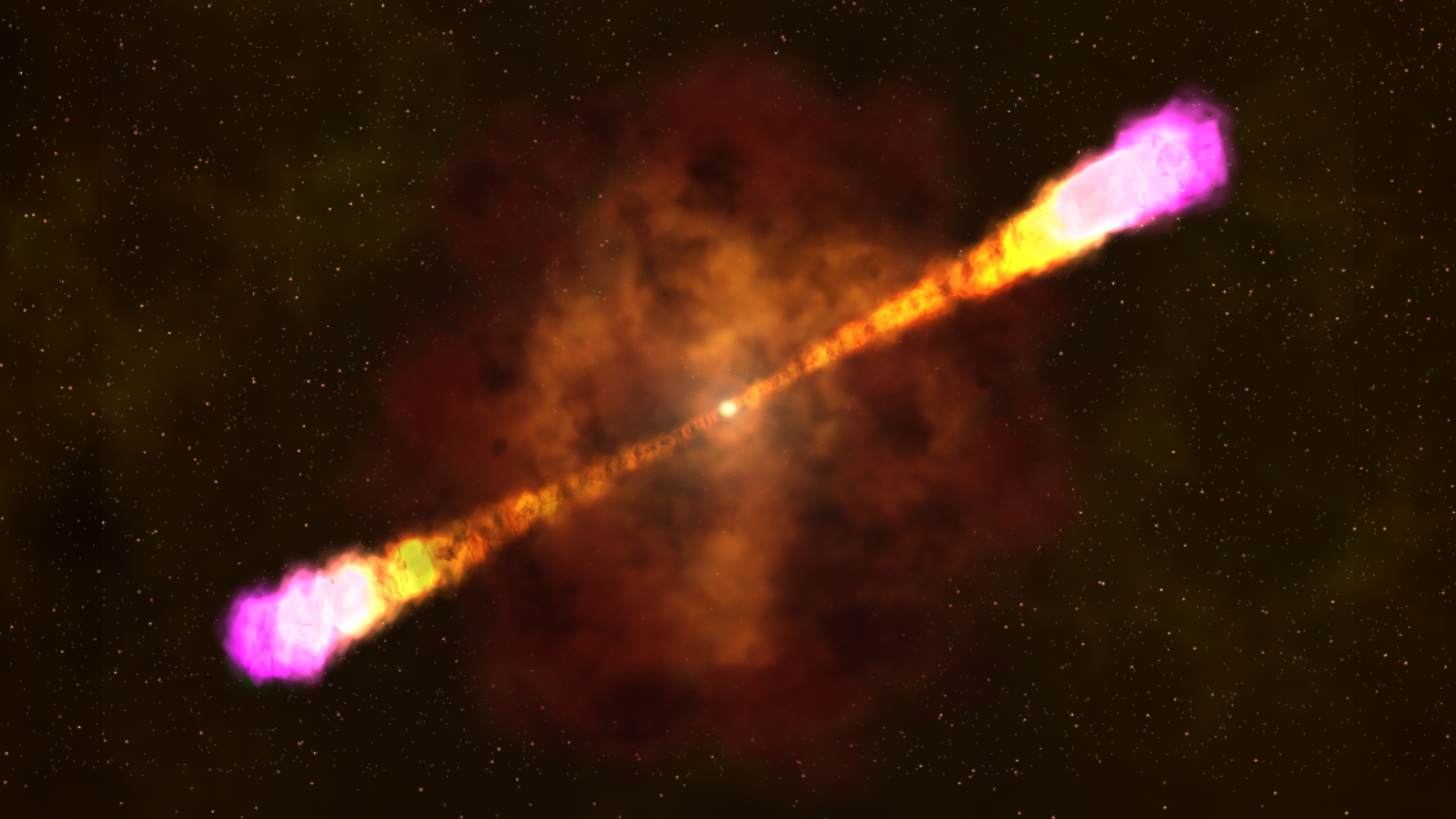
- Typical Gamma-Ray Burst (illustration)
- Event type: Gamma-ray burst
- Duration: 680 seconds
- Constellation: Delphinus
- Right ascension: 20^{h} 34^{m} 23.25^{s}
- Declination: +06° 55 ′ 10.5″
- Other designations: GRB 160625B
- Related media on Commons

GRB 160625B was a bright gamma-ray burst (GRB) detected by NASA's Fermi Gamma-ray Space Telescope on 25 June 2016 and, three minutes later, by the Large Area Telescope. This was followed by a bright prompt optical flash, during which variable linear polarization was measured. This was the first time that these observations were made when the GRB was still bright and active. The source of the GRB was a possible black hole, within the constellation Delphinus, about 9 billion light-years (light travel distance) away (a redshift of z = 1.406). It had a fluence of 5.7×10^{−4} erg cm^{−2}, and energy of 5 × 10^{54} erg. The burst lasted over 11 minutes (680 s), and is one of the most energetic bursts ever recorded.

== See also ==
- List of gamma ray bursts
- Swift Gamma-Ray Burst Mission
- Ultra-Fast Flash Observatory Pathfinder
- GRB 221009A a 1.2×10^{55} erg gamma-ray burst
- GRB 080916C a 8.8×10^{54} erg gamma-ray burst
