= GRB 000131 =

GRB in the constellation Carina

- Event type: Gamma-ray burst
- Constellation: Carina
- Redshift: 4.5 ±0.1, 4.5
- Other designations: GRB 000131

GRB 000131 was a gamma-ray burst (GRB) that was detected on 31 January 2000 at 14:59 UTC. A gamma-ray burst is a highly luminous flash associated with an explosion in a distant galaxy and producing gamma rays, the most energetic form of electromagnetic radiation, and often followed by a longer-lived "afterglow" emitted at longer wavelengths (X-ray, ultraviolet, optical, infrared, and radio).

== Observations ==
GRB 000131 was detected on 31 January 2000 at 14:59 UTC by Ulysses, KONUS, NEAR Shoemaker, and BATSE. It lasted approximately 90 seconds. The initial position, derived from the observations of all the aforementioned spacecraft, was estimated at a right ascension of 6^{h} 13^{m} 32.72^{s} and a declination of −51° 55′ 36.77″. On 4 February 2000, optical observations of the region were made by telescopes at Paranal Observatory and La Silla Observatory in Chile which revealed the burst's optical afterglow.

== Distance record ==
GRB 000131 had a redshift of approximately z = 4.5. This corresponds to a distance of about 11 billion light years, making it the most distant gamma-ray burst that had ever been recorded up to that date. This distance record was broken by GRB 050904, which had a redshift of z = 6.29.

== Optical emission ==
GRB 000131 was the first gamma-ray burst to have its optical afterglow detected by an 8-meter telescope. At the time of its discovery, GRB 000131 was the most distant burst ever detected. However, it was not the most energetic: assuming isotropic emission, the total energy output of the burst was approximately 10^{54} ergs, placing it in second behind GRB 990123. Furthermore, the gamma-ray data also suggested that the burst was beamed rather than isotropic, a characteristic which would further decrease the total energy output. This demonstrated the importance of the use of optical telescopes in the studies of gamma-ray bursts.

Preceded by GRB 971214	Most distant gamma-ray burst 2000 — 2005	Succeeded by GRB 050904
