= GRB 670702 =

First recorded gamma ray burst

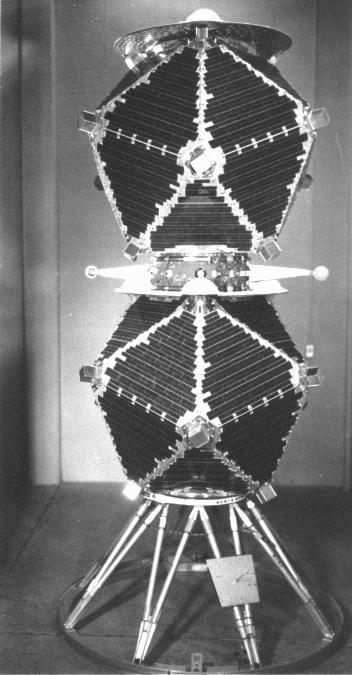
- The Vela satellites which detected the gamma ray burst
- Event type: Gamma ray burst
- Date: July 1967
- Duration: Seconds
- Instrument: Vela 4
- Notable features: First gamma ray burst discovered
- Other designations: GRB 670702

GRB 670702 is a gamma ray burst (GRB) known for being the first gamma ray burst detected in history. It was detected on 2 July 1967 by the Vela 4 satellite, a US satellite that monitored worldwide compliance with the 1963 nuclear test ban treaty. The event lasted around ten seconds with an energy emission in the MeV band and a double pulse light curve. Its properties were distinct from those expected from a nuclear test in space. Directional information strongly suggested an origin distinct from the Earth or Sun.
