= MPG/ESO telescope =

Telescope at the European Southern Observatory

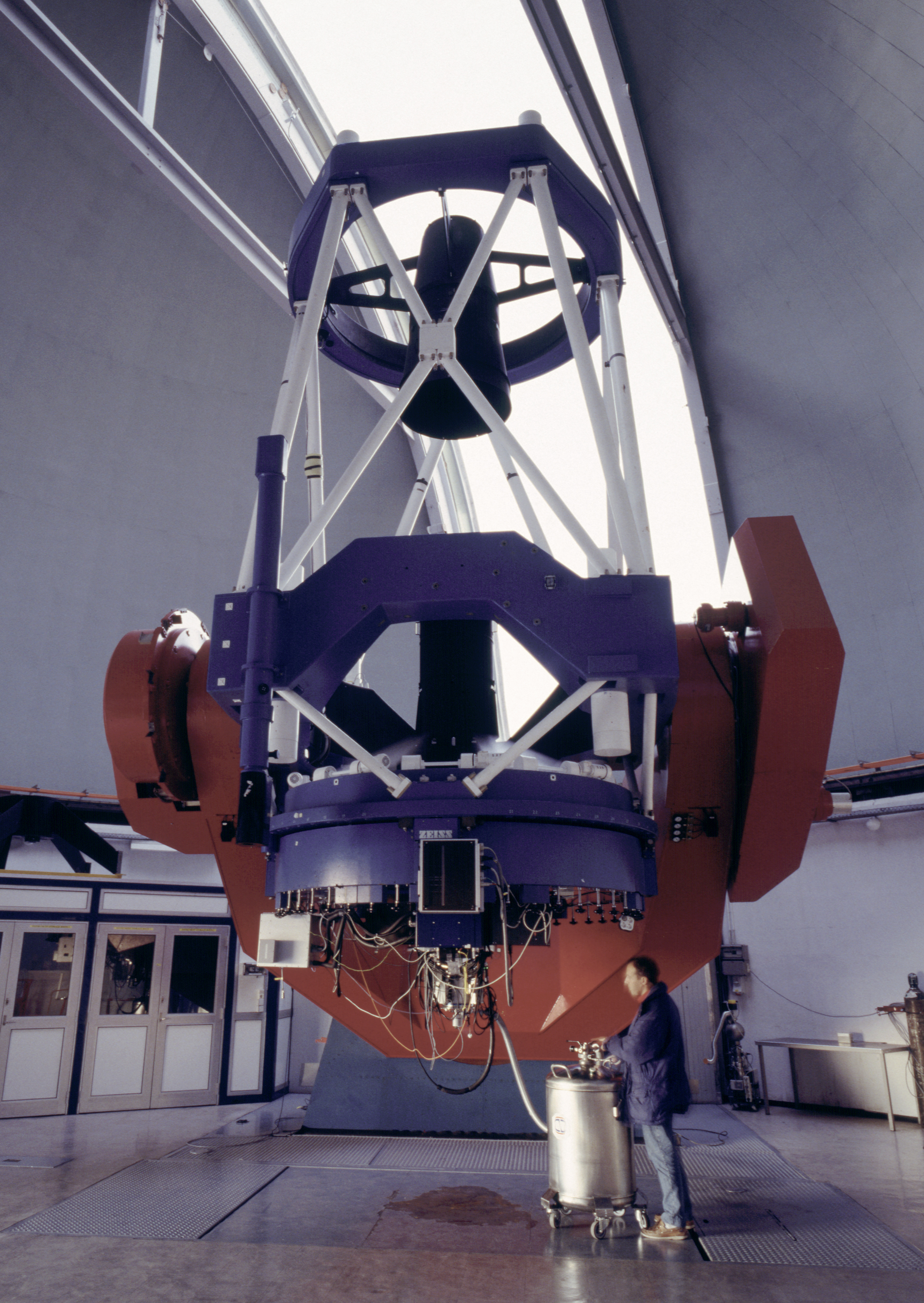
- Part of: La Silla Observatory
- Location(s): Atacama Desert
- Coordinates: 29°15′28″S 70°44′12″W
- Organization: European Southern Observatory; Max Planck Institute for Astronomy
- Altitude: 2,375 m (7,792 ft)
- First light: 22 June 1983
- Diameter: 2.20 m (7 ft 3 in)
- Secondary diameter: 0.84 m (2 ft 9 in)
- Collecting area: 3.8 m^{2} (41 sq ft)
- Focal length: 17.6 m (57 ft 9 in)
- Mounting: equatorial mount
- Website: www.eso.org/public/teles-instr/lasilla/mpg22/
- Location of MPG/ESO telescope
- Related media on Commons

The MPG/ESO telescope is a 2.2-metre f/8.0 (17.6-metre) ground-based telescope at the European Southern Observatory (ESO) in La Silla, Chile. It was built by Zeiss and has been operating since 1984. It was on indefinite loan to the European Southern Observatory from the Max Planck Institute for Astronomy (MPIA). In October 2013 it was returned to the MPIA. Telescope time is shared between MPIA and MPE observing programmes, while the operation and maintenance of the telescope are ESO's responsibility.

The telescope hosts three instruments: the 67-million-pixel Wide Field Imager with a field of view able to cover the full Moon; GROND, the Gamma-Ray Burst Optical/Near-Infrared Detector, which chases the afterglows of the most powerful explosions in the universe, known as gamma-ray bursts; and the high-resolution spectrograph, FEROS, used to make detailed studies of stars.

In November 2010 it was used to observe HIP 13044, and marked what was thought to be the first time a planetary system in a stellar stream of extragalactic origin had been detected. However, subsequent analysis in 2014 found no evidence for a planet orbiting the star.

== Gallery ==
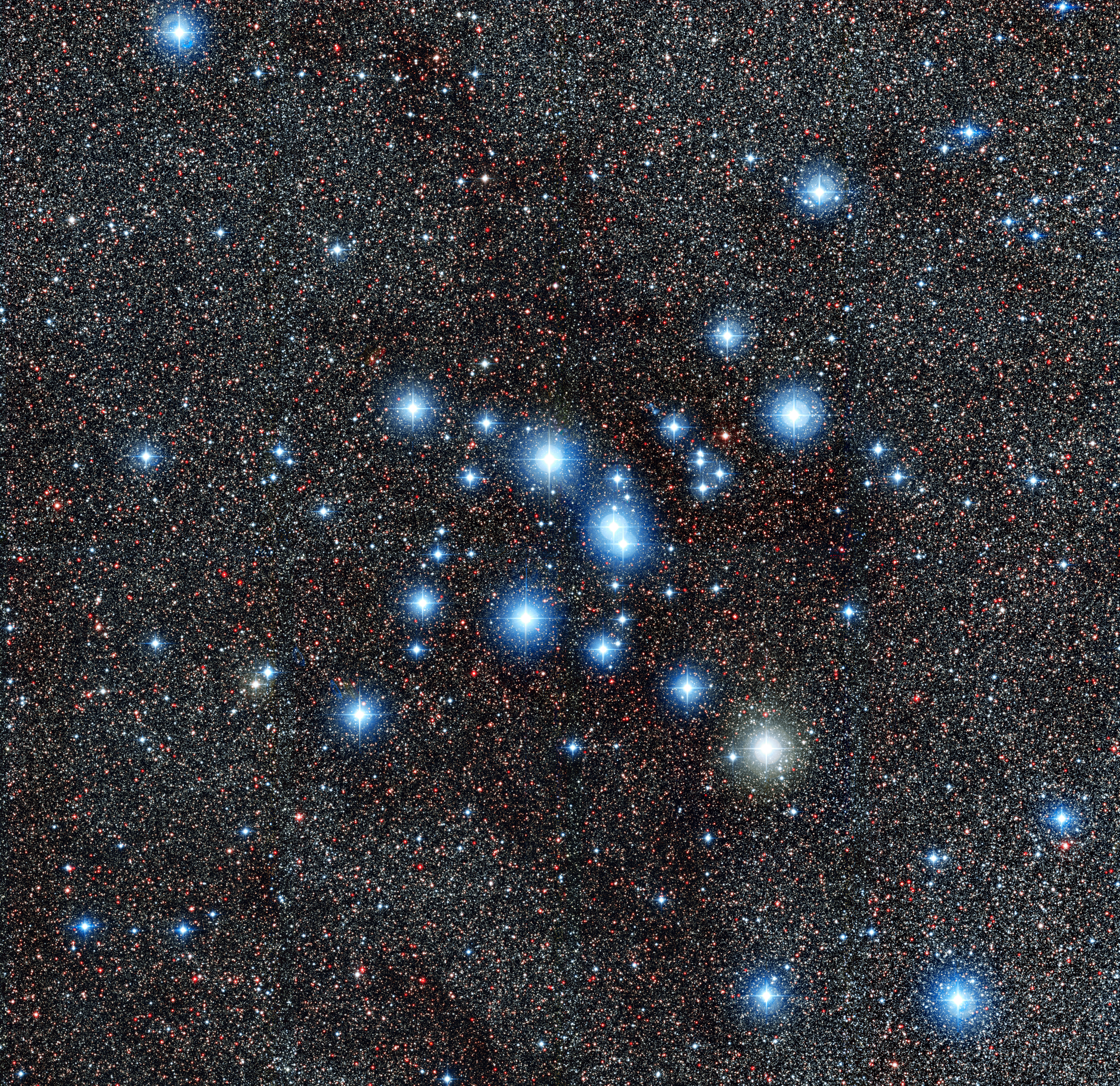
Messier 7 imaged by the 67-megapixel Wide Field Imager (WFI)

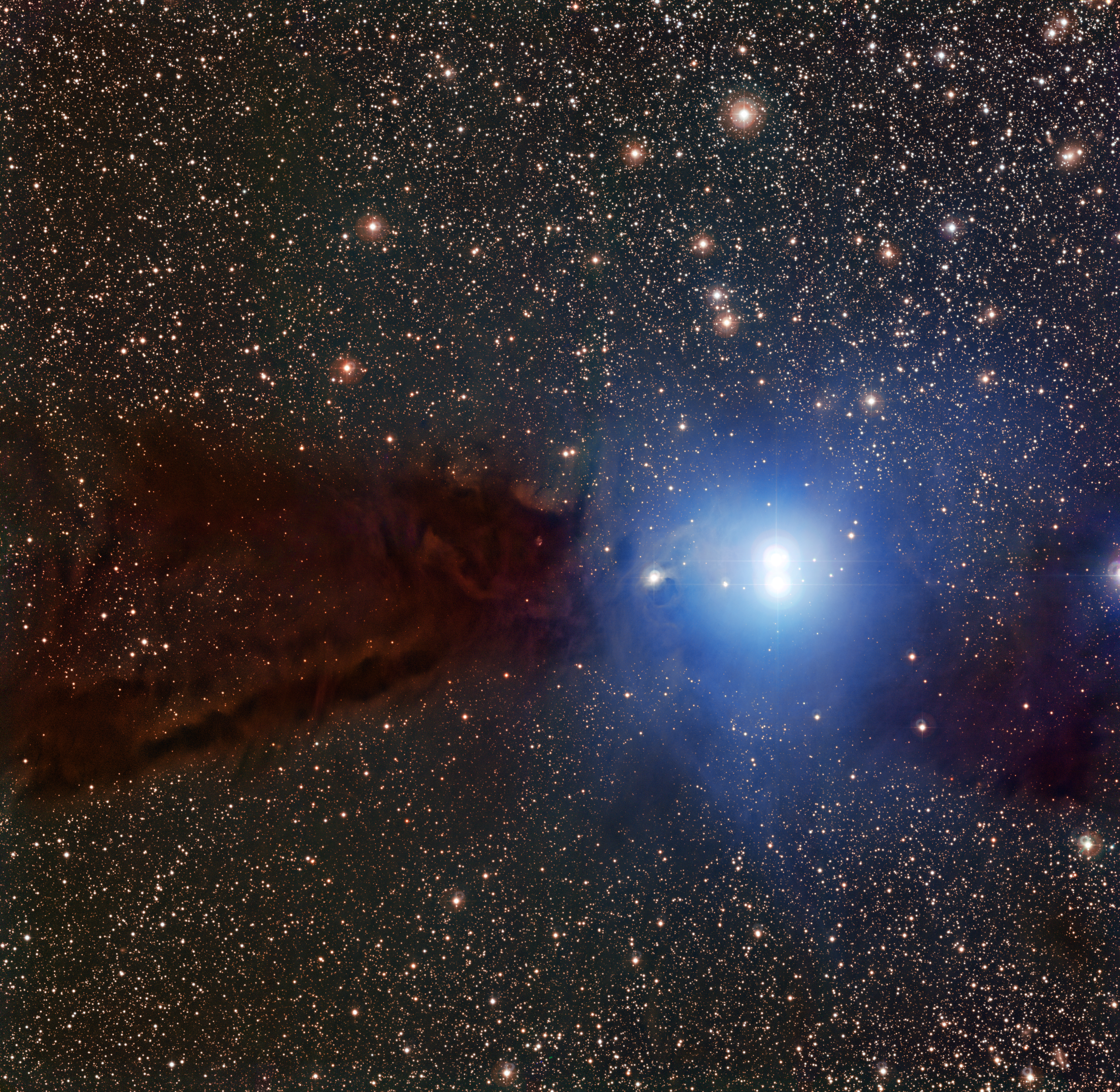
WFI captures the star-forming dark cloud Lupus 3

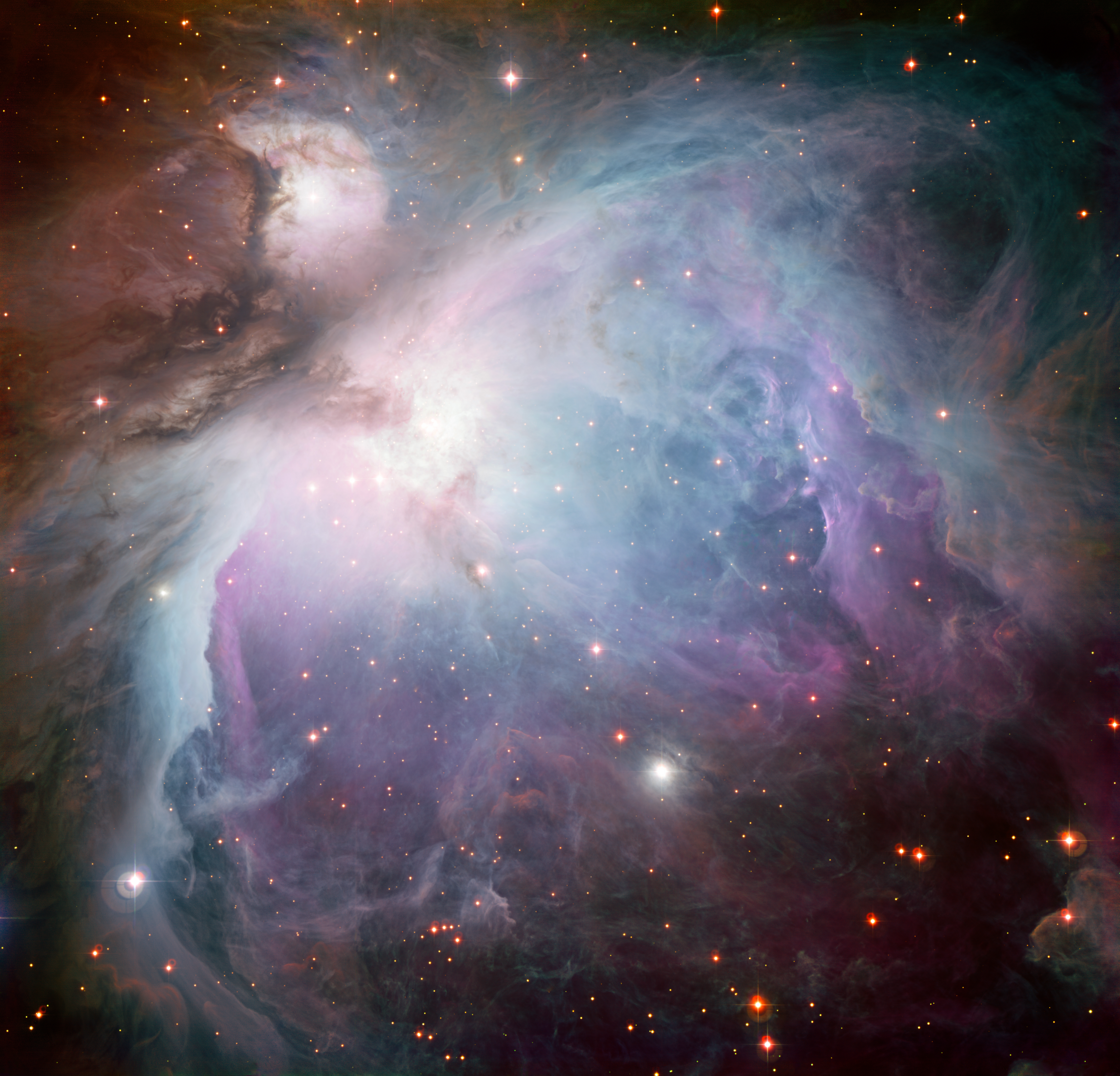
The Orion Nebula (Messier 42) captured using the WFI camera

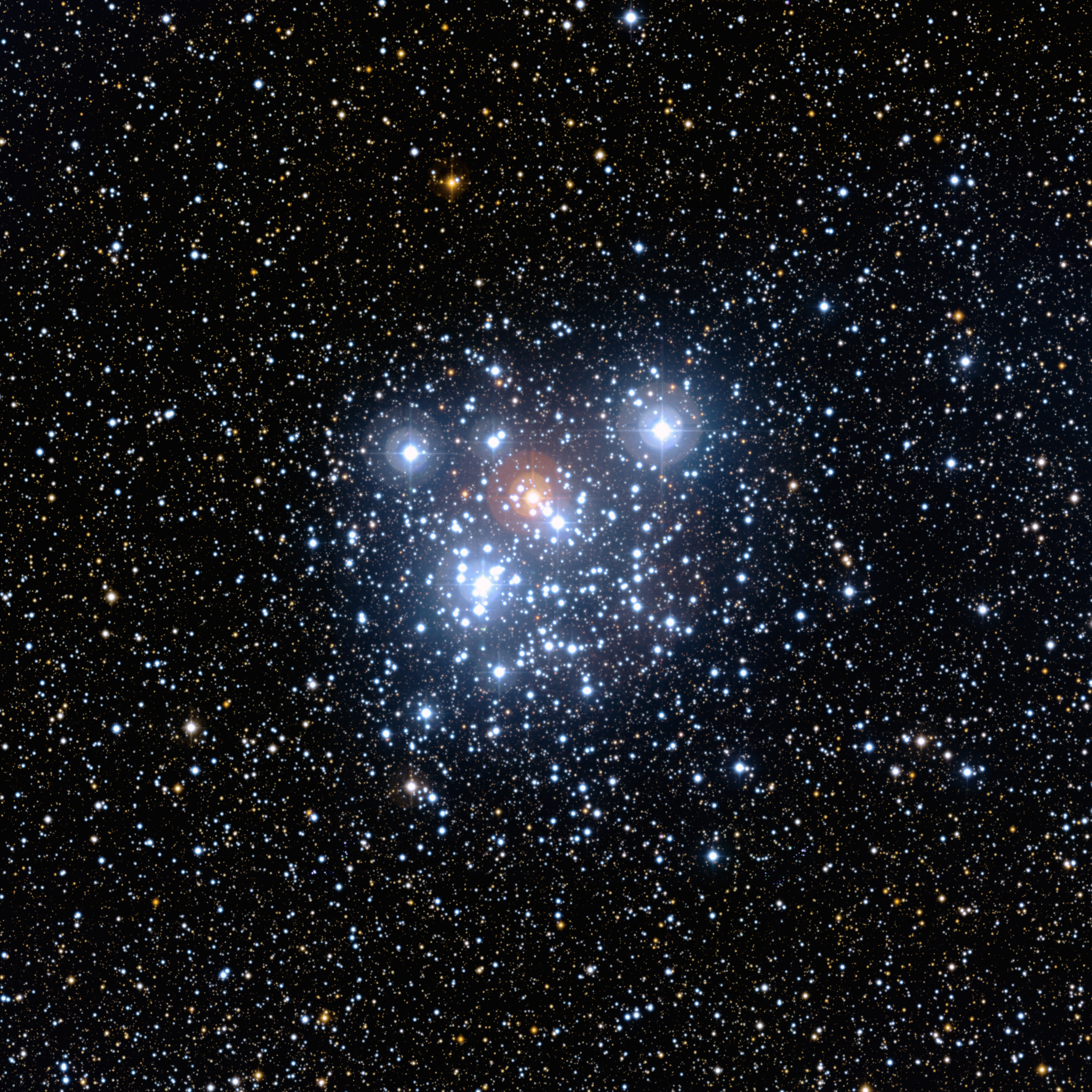
The Jewel Box NGC 4755 taken with the WFI

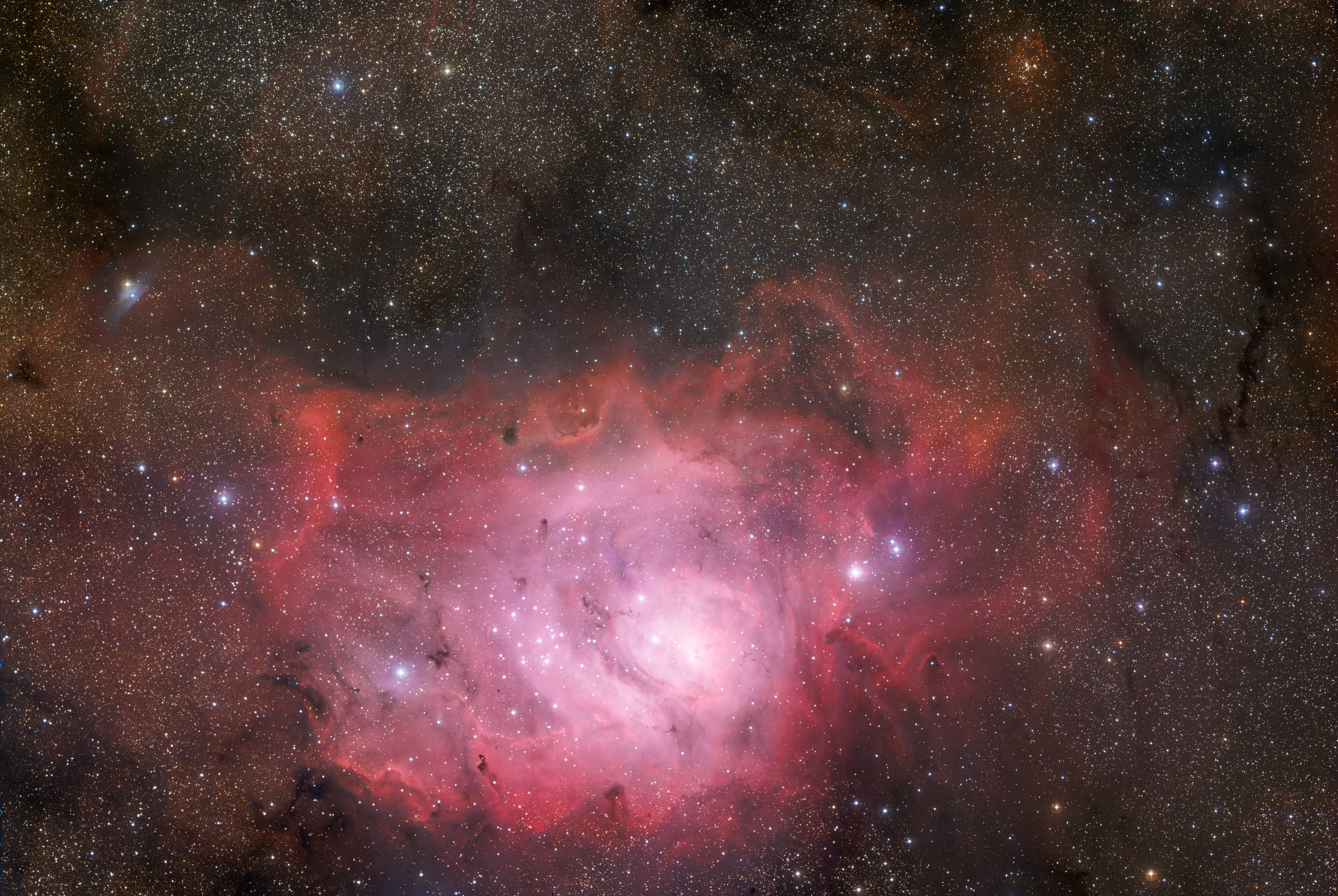
The Lagoon Nebula taken with Wide Field Imager

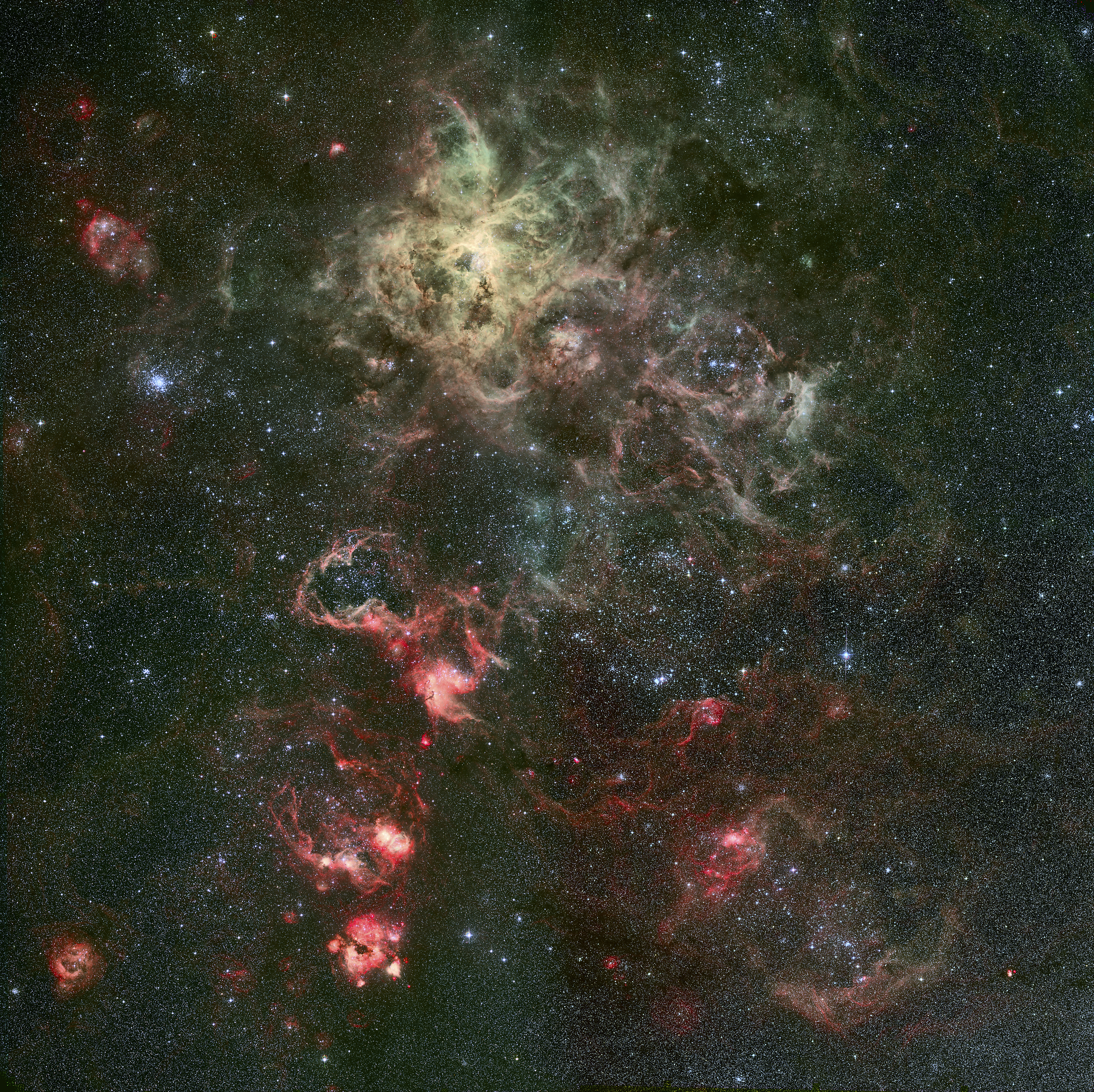
One-square-degree image of the Tarantula Nebula using the WFI

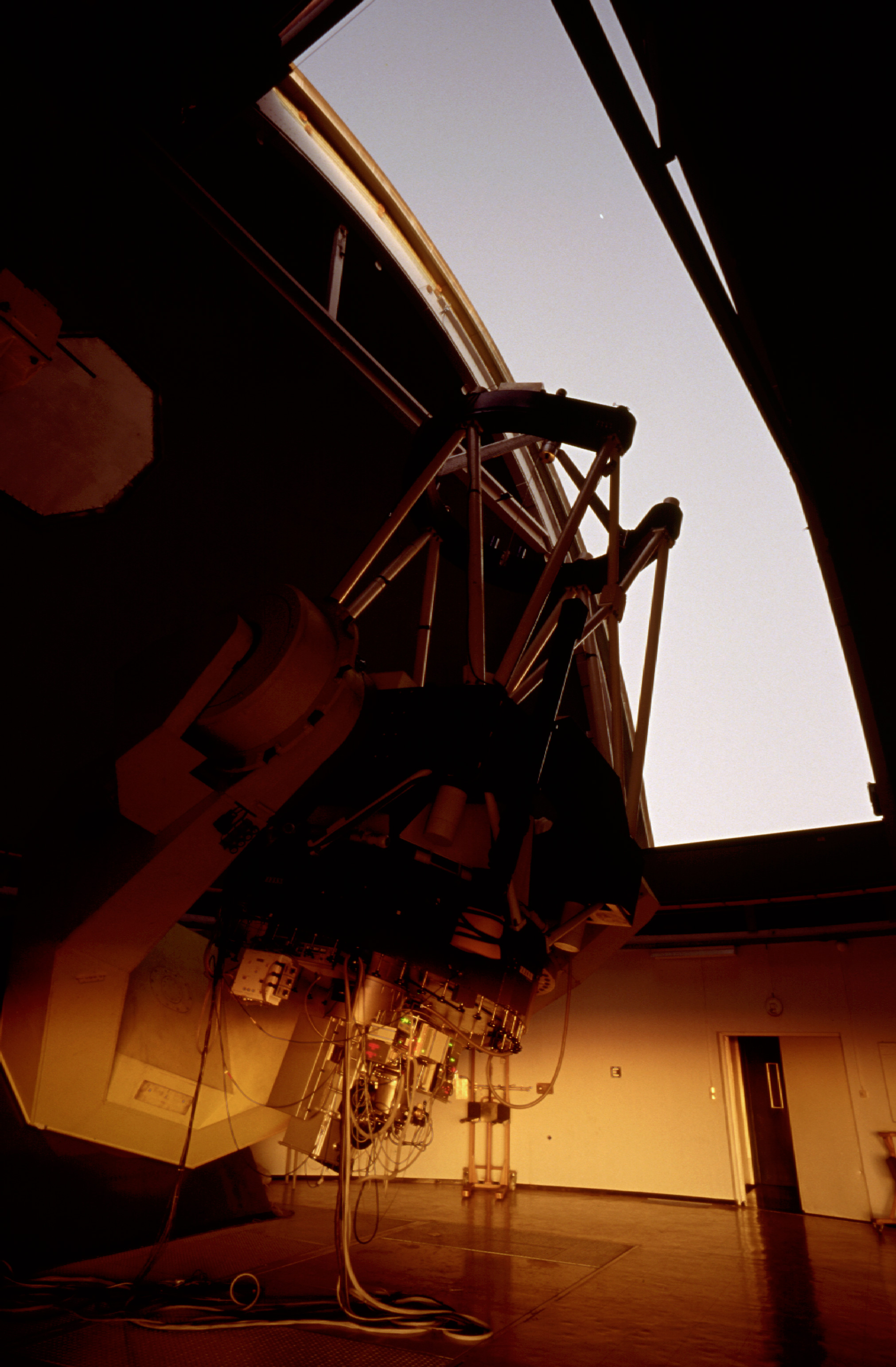
The ESO 2.2-metre telescope in its enclosure in 1996

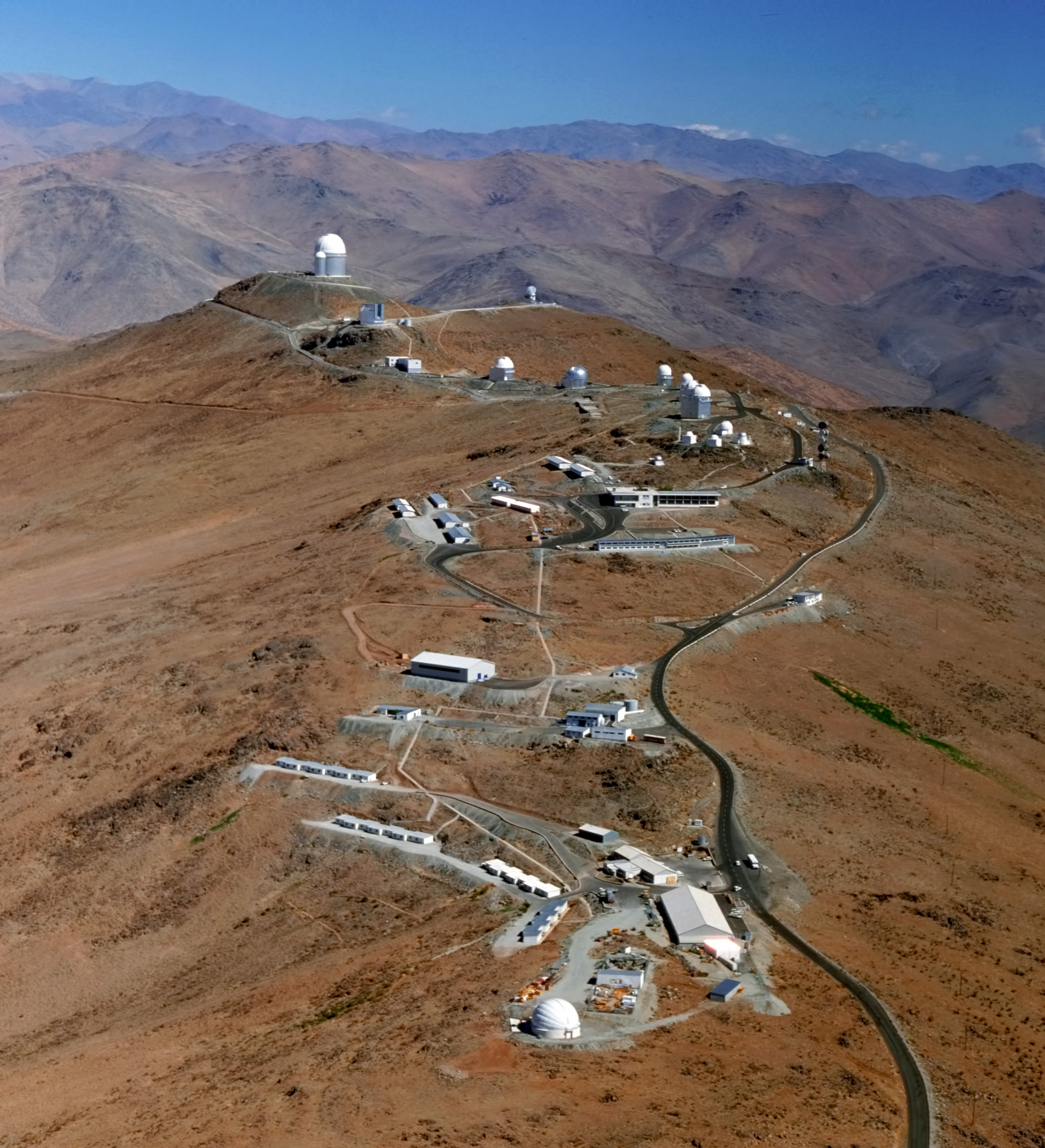
Aerial view of the La Silla Observatory, home of the MPG/ESO telescope

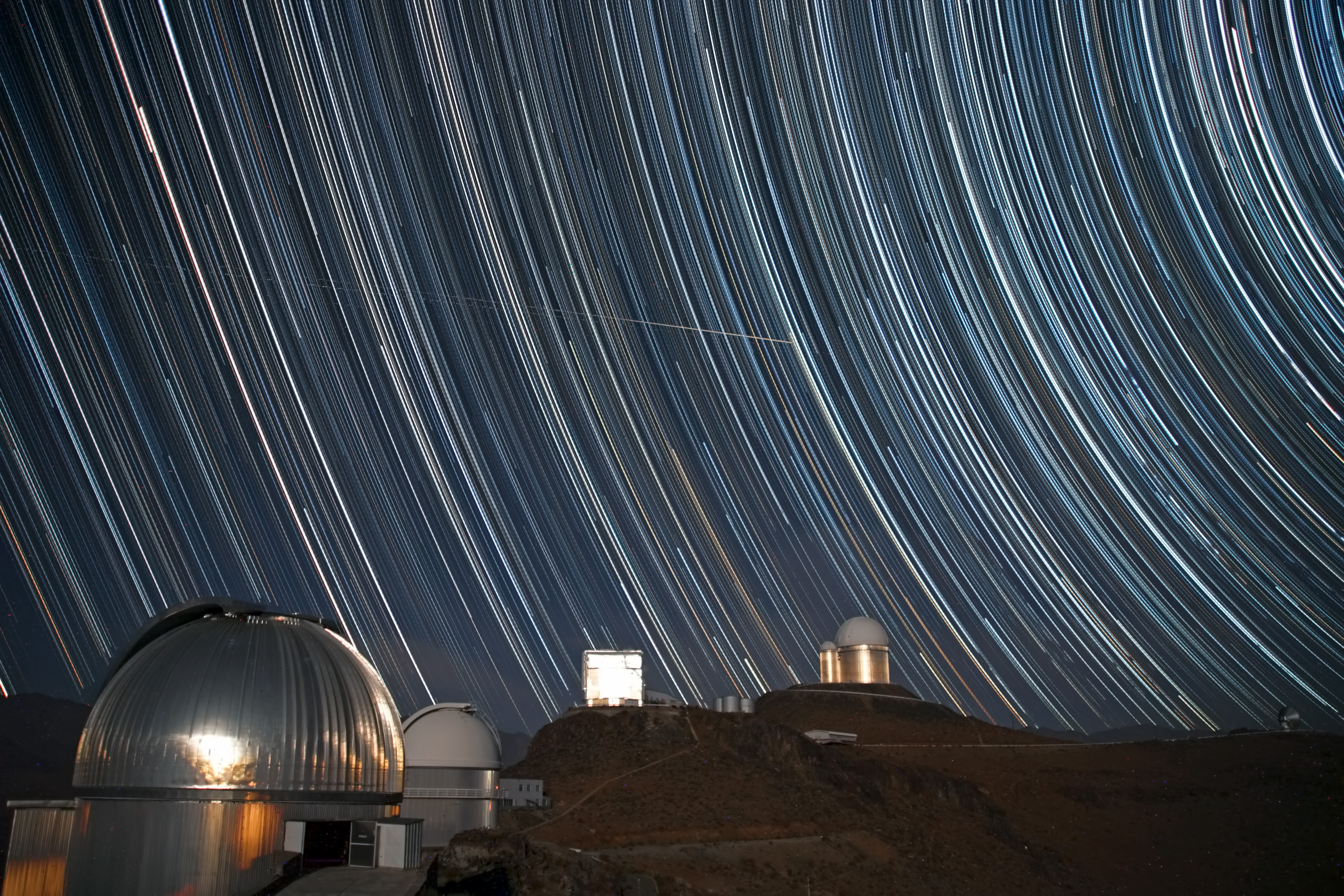
MPG/ESO telescope's silver dome is seen in the foreground

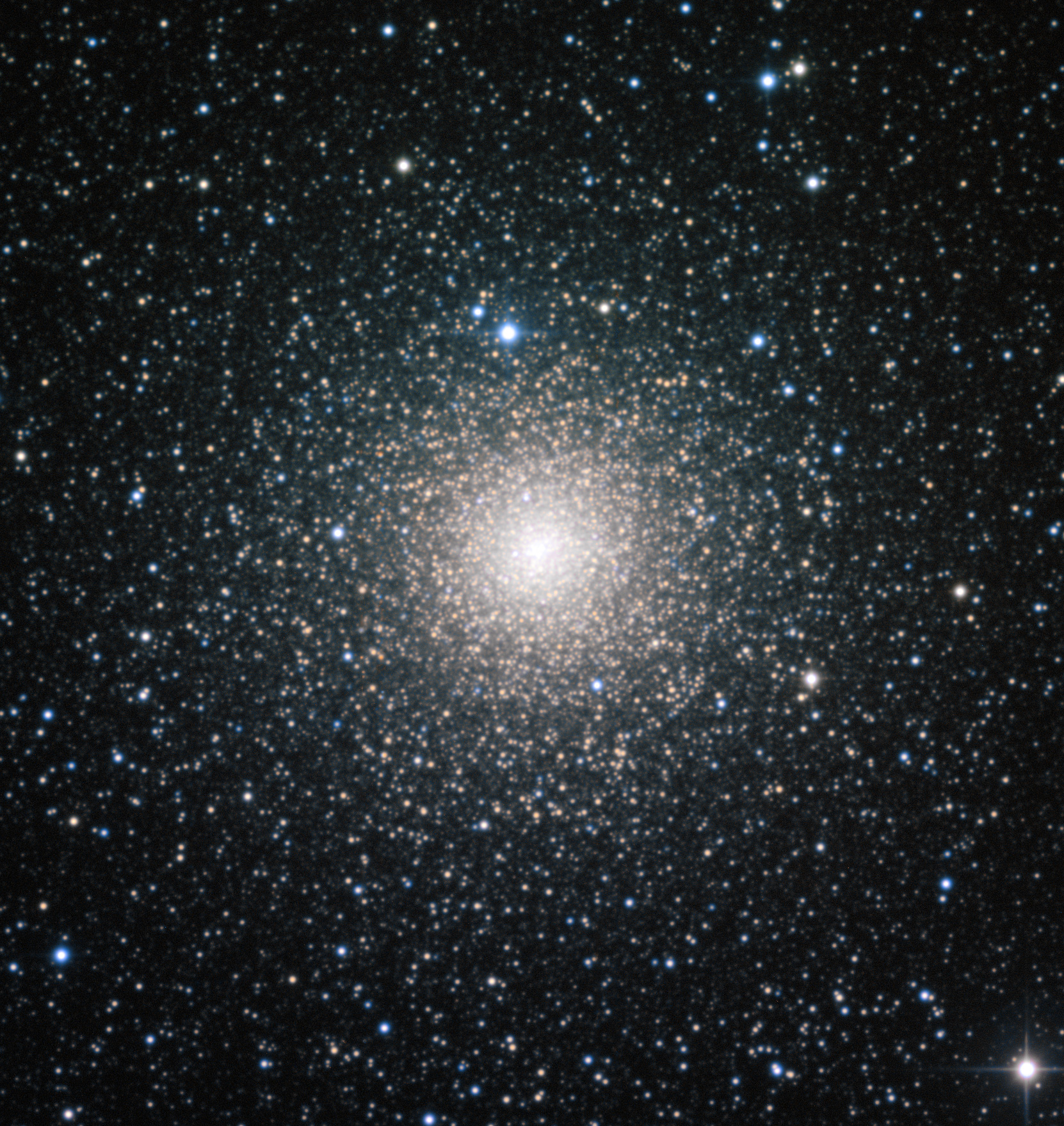
MPG/ESO telescope images NGC 6388

== See also ==
- Lists of telescopes
