= GRB 090423 =

Very distant gamma-ray burst detected in 2009

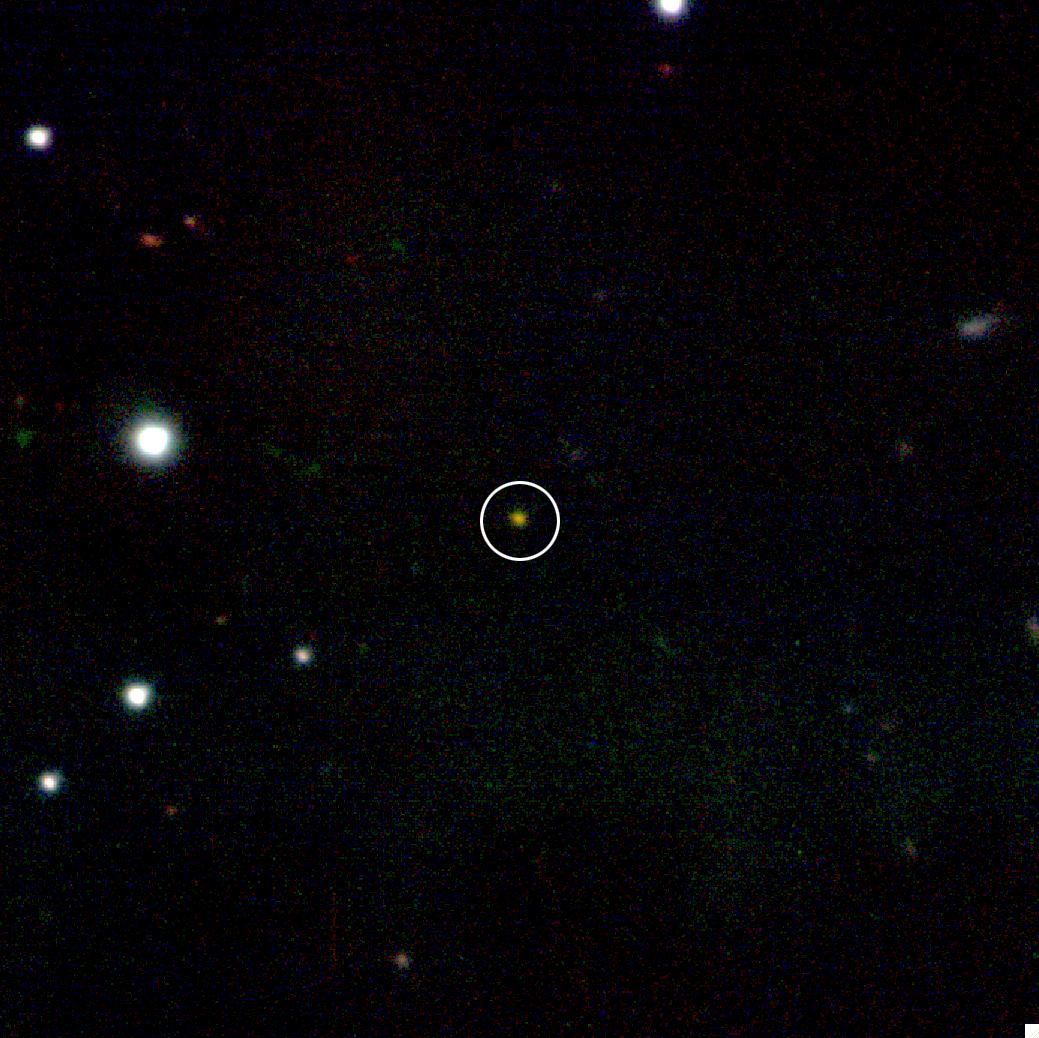
- Afterglow of GRB 090423
- Event type: Gamma-ray burst
- Date: c. 13 billion years ago (detected 23 April 2009, 07:55:19 UTC)
- Duration: c. 10 seconds
- Instrument: Swift
- Constellation: Leo
- Right ascension: 09^{h} 55^{m} 33.08^{s}
- Declination: +18° 08′ 58.9″
- Distance: c. 30 billion ly
- Redshift: 8.0 ≤ z ≤ 8.3
- Other designations: GRB 090423A, GRB 090423, Fermi bn090423330
- Related media on Commons

GRB 090423 was a gamma-ray burst (GRB) detected by the Swift Gamma-Ray Burst Mission on April 23, 2009, at 07:55:19 UTC whose afterglow was detected in the infrared and enabled astronomers to determine that its redshift is z = 8.2, making it one of the most distant objects detected at that time with a spectroscopic redshift (GN-z11, discovered in 2016, has a redshift of 11).

A gamma-ray burst is an extremely luminous event flash of gamma rays that occurs as the result of an explosion, and is thought to be associated with the formation of a black hole. The burst itself typically only lasts for a few seconds, but gamma-ray bursts frequently produce an "afterglow" at longer wavelengths that can be observed for many hours or even days after the burst. Measurements at these wavelengths, which include X-ray, ultraviolet, optical, infrared, and radio, enable follow-up study of the event.

The finite speed of light means that GRB 090423 is also one of the earliest objects ever detected for which a spectroscopic redshift has been measured. The universe was only 630 million years old when the GRB occurred, and its detection confirms that massive stars were born and dying even very early on in the life of the universe. GRB 090423 and similar events provide a unique means of studying the early universe, as few other objects of that era are bright enough to be seen with today's telescopes.

== Discovery and observation ==
On April 23, 2009, at 07:55:19 UTC the Swift satellite detected a burst that lasted about 10 seconds and was located in the direction of the constellation Leo.

Swift localized the field in which GRB 090423 occurred, and 77 seconds after the burst, the Swift UVOT Photometric System took a 150-second exposure of the field, but was unable to detect an optical or ultraviolet afterglow. A few minutes after its discovery, ground-based telescopes began observing the field. Within 20 minutes of the burst, Nial Tanvir and his team found an infrared source at the Swift position using the United Kingdom Infrared Telescope (UKIRT) on Mauna Kea, Hawaii. The initial observations taken by UKIRT were triggered autonomously via the eSTAR Project. They observed a drop off in flux beyond 1.13 micrometres with the VLT. Attributing this drop off to Lyman alpha absorption by neutral hydrogen in the intergalactic medium, they calculated a redshift of 8.2 for GRB 090423. The team of C.C. Thöne and Paolo D'Avanzo observed the afterglow of GRB 090423 using the Italian TNG 3.6m telescope located in the Canary Islands, Spain. They obtained two hours of spectra, which when combined, suggested a very weak signal at the position of the afterglow. They too saw a drop off in flux near 1.1 micrometres, and reported a redshift of 8.1 for GRB 090423, which is consistent, within error, of the redshift reported by Tanvir et al. The redshift of 8.1 suggest the burst may have lasted approximately 1.2 seconds in the local frame of the emitter, its duration being redshifted accordingly to the observed 10 seconds.

The intergovernmental astronomy organisation, European Southern Observatory (ESO) operates the Very Large Telescope that obtained the spectrum reported by Tanvir et al. The GRB was not visible in Chile when Swift first detected the burst at 07:55 UTC, but was the following day at 03:00 UTC, which enabled the Gamma-Ray Burst Optical/Near-Infrared Detector (GROND) at La Silla Observatory to make observations of the burst, and find a photometric redshift consistent with the value reported elsewhere. The last observers to gather data during the event was the Combined Array for Research in Millimeter-wave Astronomy (CARMA) observatory. The observation of GRB 090423 by CARMA was taken at a frequency of 92.5 GHz. While the afterglow was not detected, they were able to place a 3-sigma upper limit of 0.7 mJy on the flux density of the afterglow.

=== Observation history ===
Date	Time	Details of the sequence of GRB 090423 observations
April 23, 2009	07:55 UTC	Swift starts detecting burst, GRB 090423 is not yet visible in Chile
April 23, 2009	07:58 UTC	Several groups in the United States begin their observations of the GRB
April 23, 2009	08:16 UTC	First observations of an infrared afterglow by Tanvir's team using UKIRT in Mauna Kea, Hawaii (http://gcn.gsfc.nasa.gov/gcn3/9202.gcn3) triggered via the eSTAR project
April 23, 2009	15:00 UTC	Using Gemini-North, Cucchiara's team also in Hawaii, reports a wrong photometry claiming that z=9 (http://gcn.gsfc.nasa.gov/gcn3/9209.gcn3)
April 23, 2009	20:30 UTC	Cucchiara retracts report and revises photometry placing a constrain on the redshift between 7 and 9 (http://gcn.gsfc.nasa.gov/gcn3/9213.gcn3)
April 23, 2009	22:00 UTC	An Italian team led by Thöne using Telescopio Nazionale Galileo (TNG) starts its observation
April 23, 2009	23:00 UTC	The GRB now becomes visible in Chile and the Gamma-Ray Burst Optical/Near-Infrared Detector (GROND) at La Silla Observatory, observes at 7 bands simultaneously
April 24, 2009	01:30 UTC	Tanvir's team using the Very Large Telescope (VLT) starts its observations
April 24, 2009	03:00 UTC	Olivares' team in Chile report a photometric redshift of z=8 (with errors +0.5, −1.2)
April 24, 2009	03:15 UTC	The Italian team led by Thöne reports a spectroscopic redshift of z=7.6
April 24, 2009	07:30 UTC	Tanvir reports a spectroscopic redshift of z=8.2
April 24, 2009	14:00 UTC	Italian team revises their spectroscopic redshift to z=8.1
April 25, 2009	03:45 UTC	Krimm's team using BAT released a lag analysis where long or short burst was inconclusive
April 25, 2009	10:40 UTC	VLA non-detection
April 25, 2009	18:30 UTC	Olivares' team at GROND releases final photometry at z=8.0 (with errors +0.4, −0.8)
April 28, 2009	00:30 UTC	PdB observations led by Castro-Tirado on 23–24 April able to detect the mm afterglow at a flux density of 0.2 mJy at 90 GHz
April 28, 2009	02:00 UTC	Non-detection by CARMA ( >0.7 mJy) at 92.5 GHz

== Significance ==
With a redshift of z = 8.2, at the time of observation, the burst was the most distant known object of any kind with a spectroscopic redshift. GRB 090423 was also the oldest known object in the Universe, apart from the Methuselah star. The light from the burst took approximately 13 billion years to reach Earth. Another gamma-ray burst, GRB 090429B, was subsequently found to have a photometric redshift of 9.4, which surpasses that of GRB 090423, although the comparatively large error bars from the photometric redshift technique mean that the GRB 090429B result is much less certain. The burst occurred when the Universe was approximately one twentieth of its present age. Prior to the observations done on GRB 090423, the previous record holder for age and distance for GRBs was GRB 080913, which was observed in September 2008. That burst had a redshift of 6.7, placing it approximately 190 million light-years closer to Earth than GRB 090423. Derek Fox, who led the observations done by Pennsylvania State University, suggests that the GRB was most likely the result of the explosion of a massive star and its demise, which would probably have signalled the birth of a black hole. The event occurred roughly 630 million years after the Big Bang, confirming that massive stellar births (and deaths) did indeed occur in the very early Universe. When the burst occurred it was 3.3 billion ly away from our position, but due to the expansion of the universe and the movement of galaxies, the originating galaxy is now 30 billion ly away.

Joshua Bloom of the University of California, Berkeley, who was able to observe the location of the GRB at the Gemini South telescope in Chile, called the discovery of GRB 090423 a "watershed event" as it marked "the beginning of the study of the universe as it was before most of the structure that we know about today came into being." Nial Tanvir, who was part of the VLT team, suggests that gamma-ray bursts provide a unique tool to study the universe at early times because everything else is too faint to be observed. For instance, the first generation of stars have yet to be directly observed, but the progenitor of GRB 090423 may belong to this class. These early stars are expected to contribute to the reionisation of the universe, a process which ended at a redshift of about 6. As more powerful telescopes begin operation, such as the James Webb Space Telescope, launched in December 2021, astronomers hope to pinpoint the locations of faint GRB host galaxies by observing blasts similar to that of GRB 090423.

== See also ==
- List of the most distant astronomical objects

Preceded by IOK-1	Most distant astronomical object 2009–2015	Succeeded by EGSY8p7
Preceded by GRB 080913	Most distant gamma-ray burst 2009–present	Succeeded by
