= Mikhailo Lomonosov (satellite) =

Russian astronomical satellite

Mikhailo Lomonosov (MVL-300)
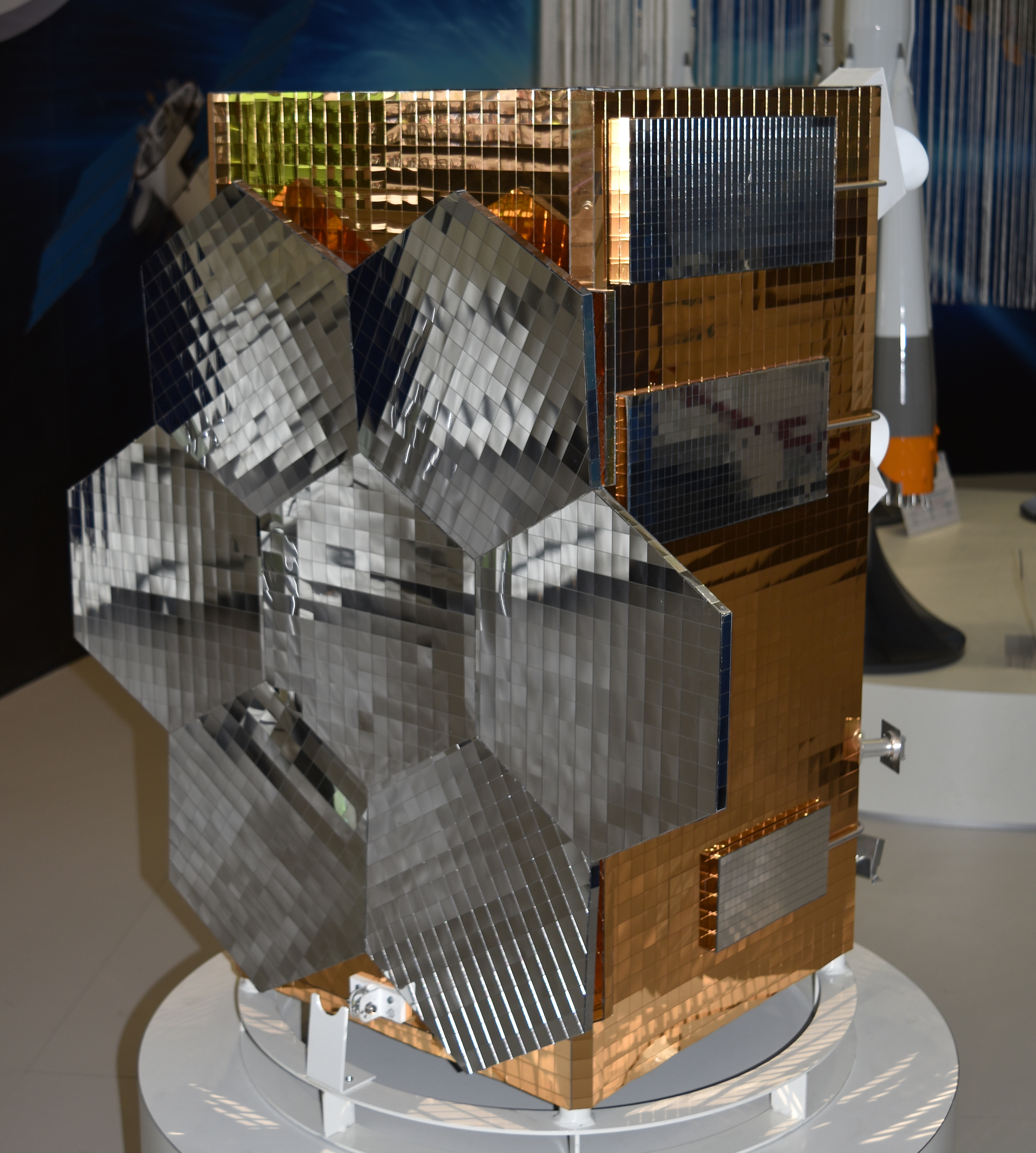
- A model of the Mikhailo Lomonosov satellite
- Mission type: Astronomy
- Operator: Moscow State University
- COSPAR ID: 2016-026A
- SATCAT no.: 41464
- Website: lomonosov.sinp.msu.ru
- Mission duration: Actual: 2 years, 2 months and 2 days Planned: 3 years

Spacecraft properties
- Manufacturer: VNIIEM
- Launch mass: 620 kg (1,370 lb)
- Payload mass: 170 kg (370 lb)
- Power: ~300 W

Start of mission
- Launch date: 28 April 2016, 02:01 UTC
- Rocket: Soyuz-2.1a/Volga
- Launch site: Vostochny, Site 1S
- Contractor: Roscosmos

End of mission
- Deactivated: 14 January 2019
- Last contact: 30 June 2018
- Decay date: 16 December 2023

Orbital parameters
- Reference system: Geocentric
- Regime: Sun-synchronous
- Semi-major axis: 6,856 km (4,260 mi)
- Perigee altitude: 478.2 km (297.1 mi)
- Apogee altitude: 492.9 km (306.3 mi)
- Inclination: 97.3°
- Period: 94.2 minutes
Instruments
- TUS: Orbital ultraviolet telescope (300–400 nm)
- BDRG: X-ray and gamma radiation detector
- UFFO: UV-optic telescope and X-ray camera
- ShOK: Wide-angle optical cameras
- DEPRON: Electron, proton, and neutron dosimeter
- ELFIN-L: Charged particles detector
- IMISS-1: Microelectromechanical inertial measuring unit
- BI: Information unit

Mikhailo Lomonosov (MVL-300, or Mikhailo, or more commonly Lomonosov; MVL stands for Mikhail Vasilyevich Lomonosov) was an astronomical satellite operated by Moscow State University (MSU) named after Mikhail Lomonosov.

== Mission ==
The objective of the mission was the observation of gamma-ray bursts, high-energy cosmic rays and transient phenomena in the Earth's upper atmosphere.

=== Launch ===
The mission launch was initially planned for 2011 when 300 years since the birthday of Mikhail Lomonosov was celebrated. After several postponements the mission was finally launched on 28 April 2016 from the Vostochny Cosmodrome by the Soyuz 2.1a launch vehicle, on the first launch from new cosmodrome.

=== Scientific payload ===
The spacecraft is equipped with seven scientific instruments:

- Tracking Ultraviolet Set Up system (TUS) was designed to measure fluorescence light radiated by EAS (Extensive Air Showers) of Ultra High Energy Cosmic Rays (UHECR) in the Earth atmosphere as well as for transients' studies within UV-range. This was the first space based instrument dedicated to these phenomena. The TUS-project started in 2001.
- Block for X-ray and gamma-radiation detection (BDRG) is intended for detecting and monitoring gamma-ray bursts and for producing a trigger signal for ShOK cameras (see below);
- UFFO consists of X-ray and 10 cm UV telescopes intended for studying gamma-ray bursts;
- Optic cameras of super-wide field of vision (ShOK) is a pair of wide-field optical cameras, which main purpose is a prompt detection of the optical radiation of gamma-ray bursts after receiving trigger signals from BDRG;
- Dosimeter of Electrons, PROtons and Neutrons (DEPRON) measures absorbed doses and spectra of electrons, protons, neutrons and heavy nuclei;
- Electron Loss and Fields Investigator for Lomonosov (ELFIN-L) comprises the Energetic Particle Detector for Electrons (EPDE), Energetic Proton Detector for Ions (EPDI) and Flux Gate Magnetometer (FGM). Its main purposes is to study energetic particles in the Earth magnetosphere;
- IMISS-1 is a device intended to test microelectromechanical inertial modules.

=== End of mission ===
The TUS-telescope aboard Lomonosov stopped data collection in late 2017.

On June 30, 2018, it was published that the Lomonosov-satellite had suffered a malfunction in its data transmission system. Attempts to fix the problem were underway, but fixing the problem had so far been unsuccessful.

As of 14 January 2019, the problems had not been solved and all the scientific equipment of the satellite were powered off. The recovery attempts continued (some systems of the satellite were responsive, the problem was with scientific payload systems). Before succumbing to these difficulties, the satellite had worked for one and a half years for its intended purpose. With the failure of the Lomonosov satellite and the Spektr-R end of mission on 30 May 2019, the Russian space program lost both of its scientific satellites until the launch of Spektr-RG in July 2019.

The satellite decayed from orbit on 16 December 2023.
