= GRB 080913 =

Supernova detected on September 13, 2008 in the constellation Eridanus

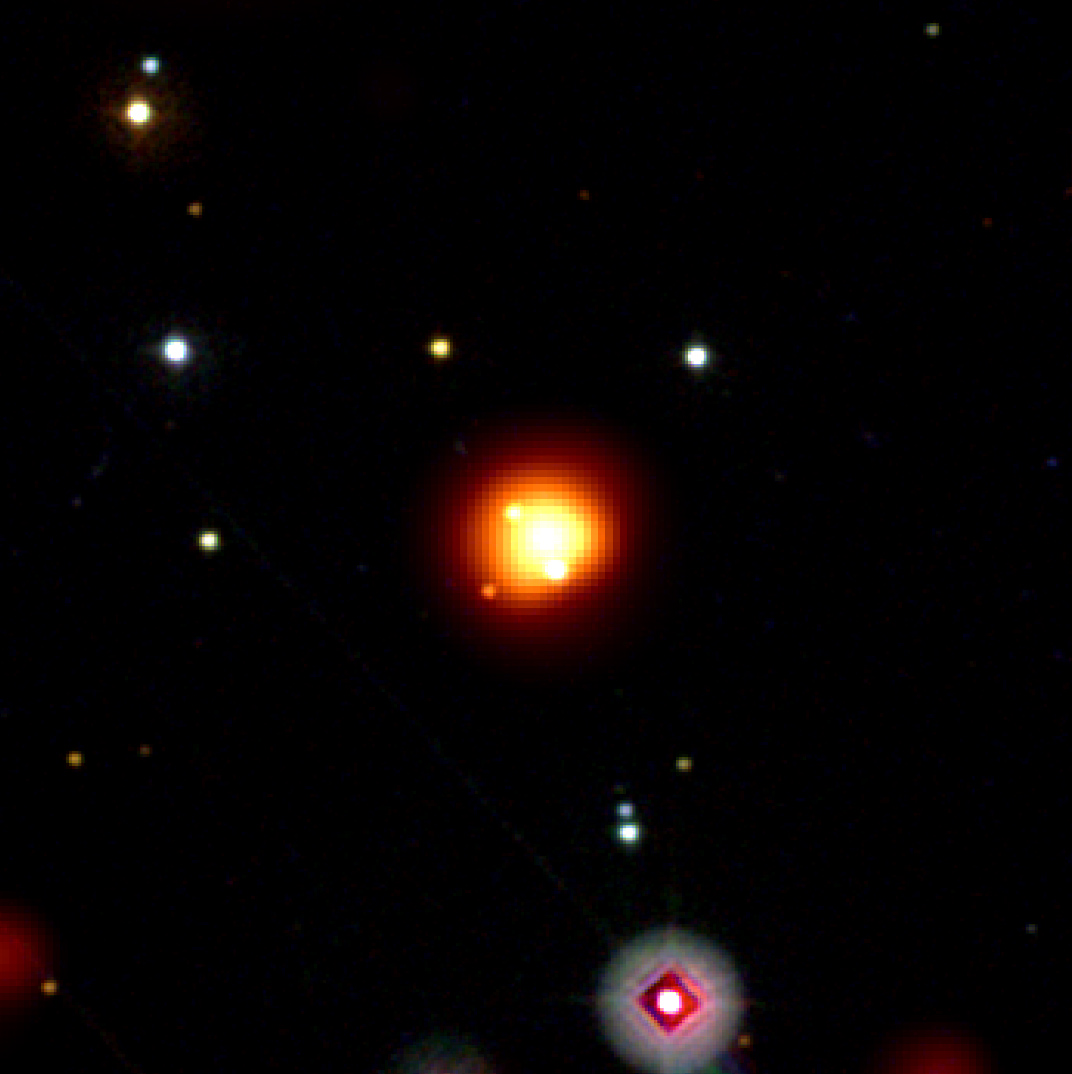
- This image merges the view through Swift's UltraViolet and Optical Telescope, which shows bright stars, and its X-ray Telescope, which captures the burst (orange and yellow). Image credit: NASA/Swift/Stefan Immler.
- Event type: Gamma-ray burst
- Unknown
- Date: Swift Burst Alert Telescope (BAT); September 13, 2008
- Constellation: Eridanus
- Right ascension: 4^{h} 22^{m} 54.7^{s}
- Declination: -25° 07' 46.2"
- Epoch: J2000
- Distance: 12.8 billion light-years (3.9 Gpc)
- Redshift: 6.7
- Remnant: Unknown
- Other designations: GRB 080913A

GRB 080913 was a gamma-ray burst (GRB) observed on September 13, 2008. The Swift Gamma-Ray Burst satellite made the detection, with follow-up and additional observations from ground-based observatories and instruments, including the Gamma-Ray Burst Optical/Near-Infrared Detector (GROND) and the Very Large Telescope. At 12.8 billion light-years and redshift of 6.7, the burst was the most distant GRB observed until GRB 090423 on April 23, 2009. This stellar explosion occurred around 825 million years after the Big Bang.

Preceded by GRB 050904	Most distant gamma-ray burst 2008 — 2009	Succeeded by GRB 090423
