= GRB 090429B =

Gamma-ray burst in constellation Canes Venatici

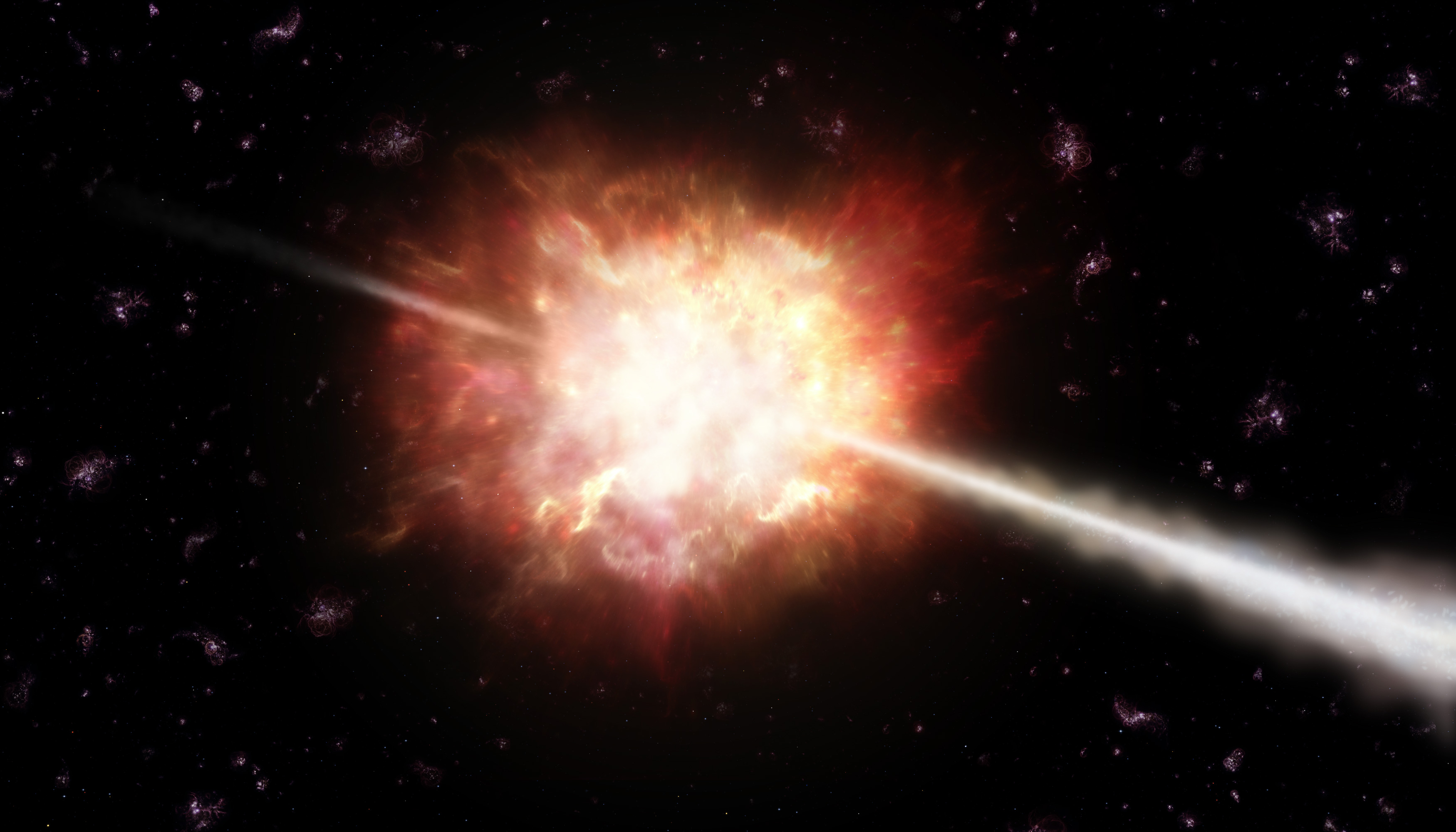
- Event type: Gamma-ray burst
- Constellation: Canes Venatici
- Right ascension: 14^{h} 02^{m} 40.10^{s}
- Declination: +32° 10′ 14.6″
- Total energy output: 3.5 × 10^{52} erg
- Other designations: GRB 090429B

GRB 090429B was a gamma-ray burst observed on 29 April 2009 by the Burst Alert Telescope aboard the Swift satellite. The burst triggered a standard burst-response observation sequence, which started 106 seconds after the burst. The X-ray telescope aboard the satellite identified an uncatalogued fading source. No optical or UV counterpart was seen in the UV–optical telescope. Around 2.5 hours after the burst trigger, a series of observations was carried out by the Gemini North telescope, which detected a bright object in the infrared part of the spectrum. No evidence of a host galaxy was found either by Gemini North or by the Hubble Space Telescope. Though this burst was detected in 2009, it was not until May 2011 that its distance estimate of 13.14 billion light-years was announced. With 90% likelihood, the burst had a photometric redshift greater than z = 9.06, which would make it the most distant GRB known, although the error bar on this estimate is large, providing a lower limit of z > 7.

The amount of energy released in the burst was estimated at 3.5 × 10^{52} erg. For a comparison, the Sun's luminosity is 3.8 × 10^{33} erg/s.

== See also ==
- GRB 090423, the most distant gamma-ray burst with spectroscopic confirmation
