= GRB 080319B =

Gamma-ray burst in the constellation Boötes

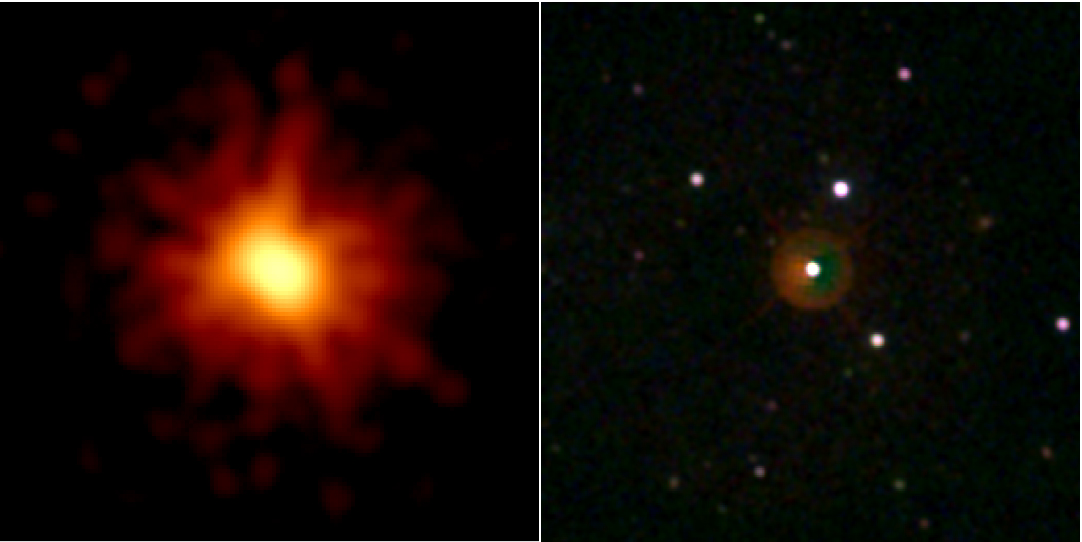
- The afterglow of GRB 080319B imaged by Swift's X-ray Telescope (left) and Optical/Ultraviolet Telescope (right)
- Event type: Gamma-ray burst
- Unknown
- Date: Swift Burst Alert Telescope (BAT); March 19, 2008
- Duration: 30 seconds to a minute
- Constellation: Boötes
- Right ascension: 14^{h} 31^{m} 40.98^{s}
- Declination: +36° 18' 8.8''
- Epoch: J2000
- Distance: 7.5 billion light-years (2.3 Gpc) z=0.937
- Redshift: 0.94
- Remnant: Unknown
- Progenitor: Unknown
- Progenitor type: Unknown
- Colour (B-V): Unknown
- Peak apparent magnitude: 5.8
- Other designations: GRB 080319B
- Related media on Commons

GRB 080319B was a gamma-ray burst (GRB) detected by the Swift satellite at 06:12 UTC on March 19, 2008. The burst set a new record for the farthest object that was observable with the naked eye: it had a peak visual apparent magnitude of 5.8 and remained visible to human eyes for approximately 30 seconds. The magnitude was brighter than 9.0 for approximately 60 seconds. If viewed from 1 AU (the average distance from Earth to the Sun) away, it would have had a peak apparent magnitude of −70.17 (21 quadrillion times brighter than the Sun seen from Earth). It had an absolute magnitude of −38.6, beaten by GRB 220101A with −39.4 in 2023.

== Overview ==
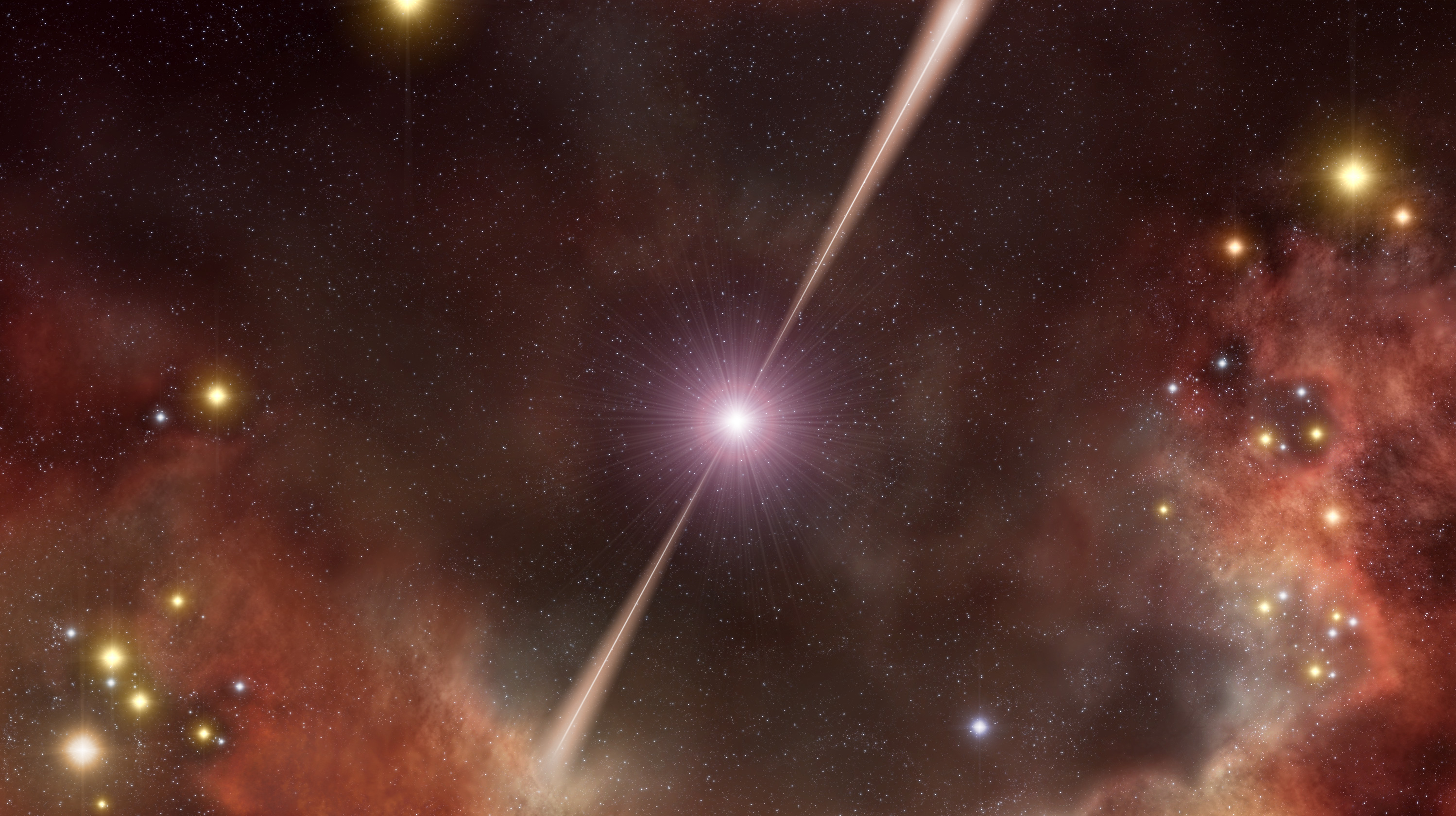
ESO artist's impression of gamma-ray burst GRB 080319B

The GRB's redshift was measured to be 0.937, which means that the explosion occurred about 7.5 billion (7.5×10^{9}) years ago (the lookback time), and it took the light that long to reach Earth. This is roughly half the time since the Big Bang. The first scientific paper submitted on the event suggested that the GRB could have easily been seen to a redshift of 16 (essentially to the time in the universe when stars were just being formed, well into the age of reionization) from a sub-meter sized telescope equipped with near-infrared filters.

The afterglow of the burst set a new record for the "most intrinsically bright object ever observed by humans in the universe", 2.5 million times brighter than the brightest supernova to date, SN 2005ap.

Evidence suggests that the afterglow was particularly bright because its gamma jet pointed directly at Earth. This allowed an unprecedented examination of the jet structure, which appears to have consisted of a narrowly focused cone and a wider secondary one. If this is the norm for GRB jets, it follows that most GRB detections only capture the fainter wide cone, which means that most distant GRBs are too faint to detect with current telescopes. This would imply that GRBs are a far more common phenomenon than so far assumed.

A record for the number of observed bursts with the same satellite on one day, four, was also set. This burst was named with the suffix B since it was the second burst detected that day. There were five GRBs detected in a 24-hour period, including GRB 080320.

Until this gamma-ray burst event, the galaxy M83, at a distance of about 15 million light years, was the most distant object visible to the naked eye, albeit only under excellent conditions. The galaxy remains the most distant permanent object viewable without aid.

The plot below shows the brightness in both the optical wavelengths and at higher energy for the event. The first optical exposure started about 2 seconds before the source was first observed by the SWIFT telescope and lasted for 10 seconds. The emission in both curves then peaks at around 15–30 seconds before a long exponential decay.

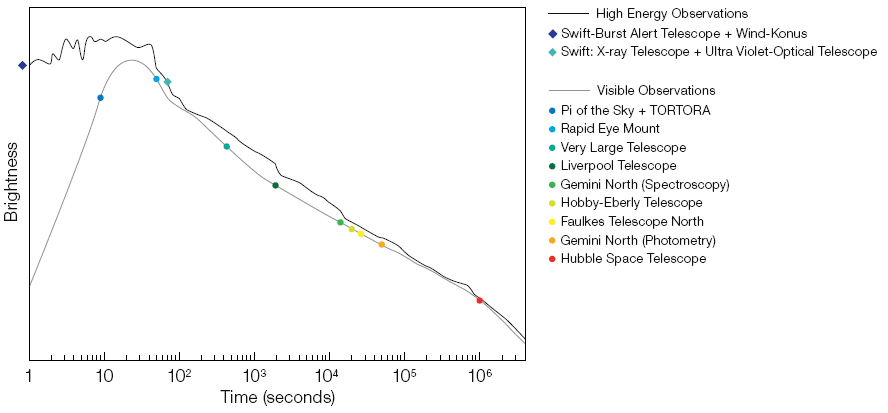
Brightness curve for GRB 080319B in optical wavelengths (black curve) and at higher energies (gray)

== See also ==
- GRB 080916C
