= GRB 830801 =

Gamma-ray burst

- Event type: Gamma-ray burst
- Constellation: Leo
- Other designations: GRB 830801B, GRB 830801

GRB 830801 is a gamma-ray burst that occurred on 1983 August 1. It is one of the brightest GRB events known.

It had a peak flux of 3.0 photons·cm^{−2}·s^{−1}·keV^{−1} averaged from 50 to 300 keV, a dead time correction by a factor of 1.9, and a smooth light curve for the peak 256 ms time interval. The peak flux P256 was around 1400 photons·s−1·cm−2.

This was also the first detection of the influence of a gamma burst on the upper atmosphere.

== Sources ==
- Time structure of the powerful event GRB 830801 http://adsabs.harvard.edu/full/1987SvAL...13..444K
