= GRB 030329 =

Gamma-ray burst that definitely proved the connection between supernova and GRBs

- Event type: Gamma-ray burst
- Constellation: Leo
- Right ascension: 10^{h} 44^{m} 49.95957^{s}
- Declination: +21° 31′ 17.4375″
- Distance: 587,000,000 pc (1.91×10^{9} ly)
- Other designations: GRB 030329A, GRB 030329, SN 2003dh

GRB 030329 was a gamma-ray burst (GRB) that was detected on 29 March 2003 at 11:37 UTC. A gamma-ray burst is a highly luminous flash associated with an explosion in a distant galaxy and producing gamma rays, the most energetic form of electromagnetic radiation, and often followed by a longer-lived "afterglow" emitted at longer wavelengths (X-ray, ultraviolet, optical, infrared, and radio). GRB 030329 was the first burst whose afterglow definitively exhibited characteristics of a supernova, confirming the existence of a relationship between the two phenomena.

== Observations ==
GRB 030329 was one of three gamma-ray bursts detected on 29 March 2003. The other two were labeled GRB 030329a and GRB 030329b. GRB 030329 was detected by multiple instruments onboard HETE at 11:37 UTC and lasted approximately 25 seconds. The burst's optical afterglow was first observed from Siding Spring Observatory less than two hours after the burst had been detected. The X-ray afterglow was first detected by RXTE approximately five hours after the burst. The radio afterglow was first detected by the Very Large Array and, at the time of its discovery, was the brightest radio afterglow ever observed. The burst was located at a sky position of R.A. = 10^{h} 44^{m} 49.95957^{s}, Dec. = +21° 31′ 17.4375″ and had a redshift of z = 0.1685, corresponding to a distance of 587 Mpc.

== Supernova relation ==
GRB 030329's proximity to Earth enabled its afterglow to be studied in great detail. A spectrum taken of the burst's optical afterglow on 6 April 2003 showed peaks at approximately 570 nm and 470 nm. This spectrum was reproduced by combining a power-law distribution with the spectrum from SN 1998bw. These supernova-like features continued to develop in the weeks after the initial burst. Optical observations taken at Kitt Peak National Observatory on indicated that the burst's optical afterglow was brighter than a power-law decay would have predicted, a deviation that could have been explained by additional light from a supernova. On 10 April 2003, NASA announced that GRB 030329 had provided the definitive link between gamma-ray bursts and supernovae. The supernova was later referred to as SN 2003dh.
