= GRB 080916C =

Most powerful gamma-ray burst ever recorded (1/15/21)

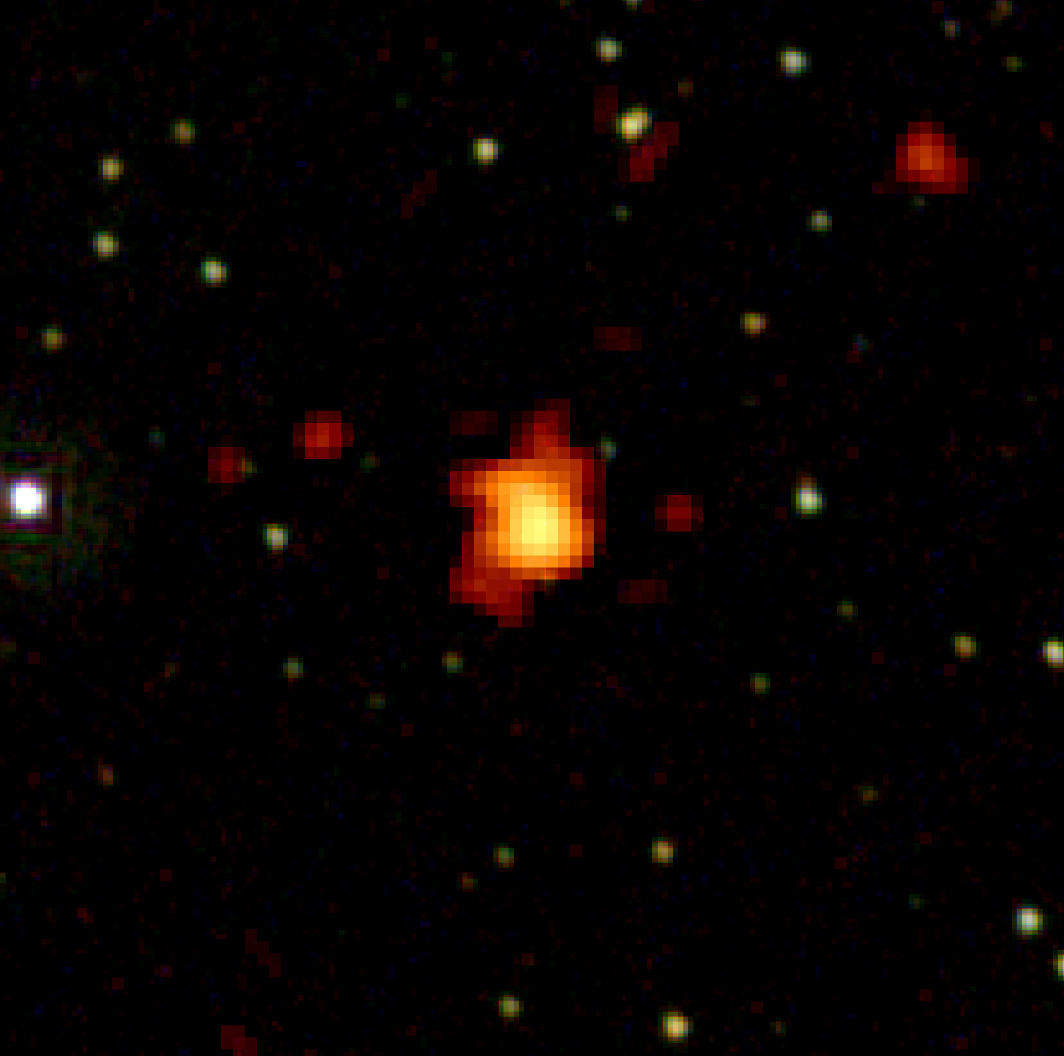
- Swift spacecraft's observation of GRB 080916C
- Event type: Gamma-ray burst
- Constellation: Carina
- Right ascension: 07^{h} 59^{m} 23.24^{s}
- Declination: −56° 38′ 16.8″
- Distance: 12,200,000,000 ly (3.7×10^{9} pc)
- Total energy output: 8.8×10^{54} ergs
- Other designations: Fermi bn080916009
- Related media on Commons

GRB 080916C is a gamma-ray burst (GRB) that was recorded on September 16, 2008, in the constellation Carina and detected by NASA's Fermi Gamma-ray Space Telescope. The burst lasted for 23 minutes (1400 s). It is one of the most extreme gamma-ray bursts ever recorded, and was the most energetic gamma-ray burst ever recorded, until GRB 221009A was recorded in 2022. The explosion had the energy of approximately 9000 type Ia supernovae if the emission was isotropically emitted, and the gas jets emitting the initial gamma rays moved at a minimum velocity of approximately 299,792,158 m/s (99.9999% the speed of light), making this blast one of the most extreme recorded.

The 16.5-second delay for the highest-energy gamma ray observed in this burst is consistent with some theories of quantum gravity, which state that all forms of light may not travel through space at the same speed. Very-high-energy gamma rays may be slowed down as they propagate through the quantum turbulence of space-time.

The explosion took place 12.2 billion light-years (light travel distance) away. That means it occurred 12.2 billion years ago—when the universe was only about 1.5 billion years old. The burst lasted for 23 minutes, almost 700 times as long as the two-second average for high energy GRBs. Follow-up observations were made 32 hours after the blast using the Gamma-Ray Burst Optical/Near-Infrared Detector (GROND) on the 2.2 metre telescope at the European Southern Observatory in La Silla, Chile, allowing astronomers to pinpoint the blast's distance to 12.2 billion light years. The object's redshift is z = 4.35.

If all that energy from GRB 080916C could be captured and converted into usable electricity at 100% efficiency, it would produce enough electricity to supply the entire planet Earth with 13.5 octillion years of power (according to electricity consumption of 2008).

== See also ==
- GRB 080319B
- GRB 160625B a 5×10^{54} erg gamma-ray burst
