= GRB 050709 =

Gamma-ray burst

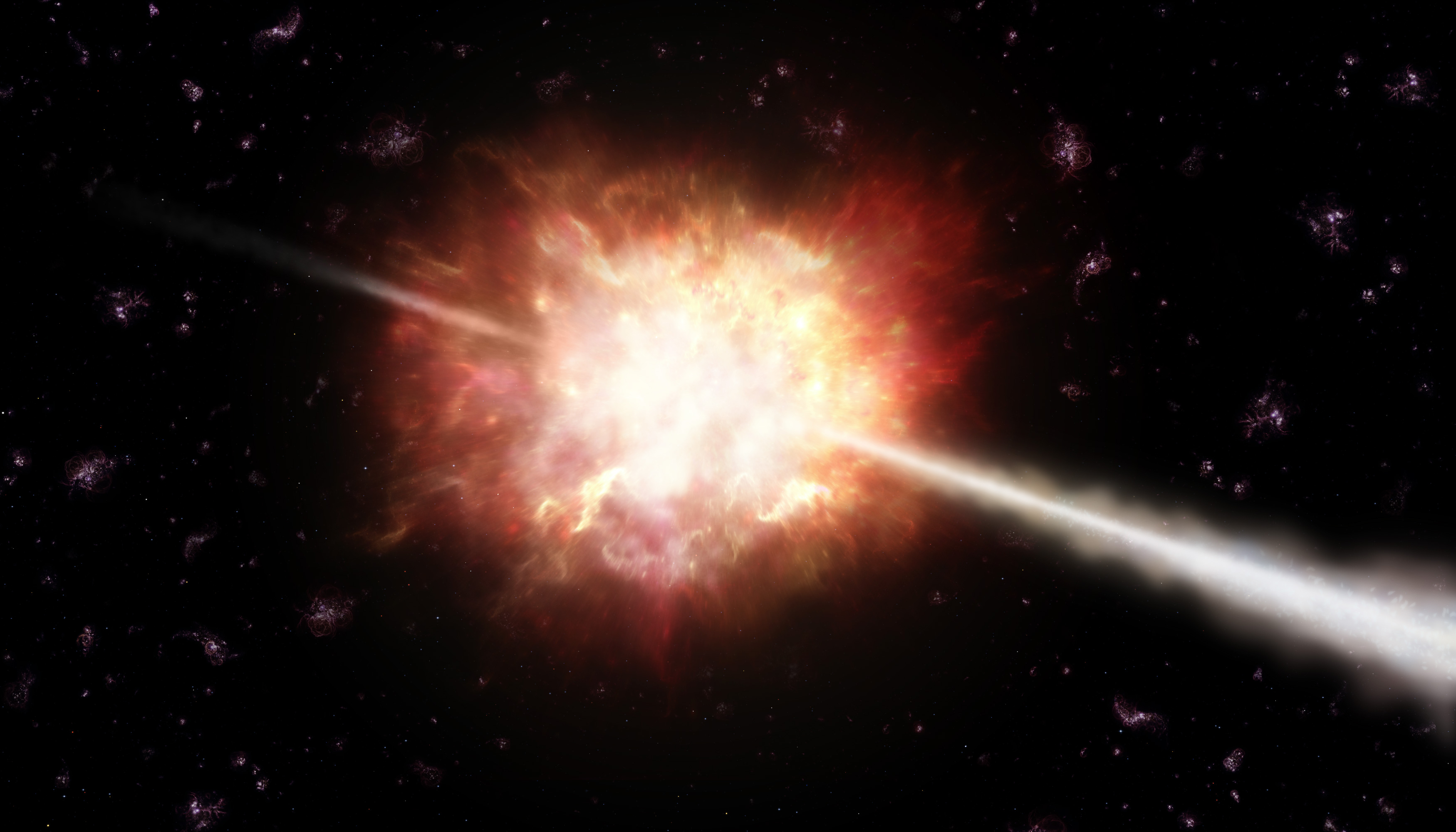
- Event type: Gamma-ray burst
- Date: c. 3 billion years ago (detected 9 July 2005, 22:36:37 UTC)
- Duration: c. 3 minutes and 100 milliseconds
- Instrument: HETE 2
- Constellation: Grus
- Right ascension: 23^{h} 01^{m} 32.1^{s}
- Declination: −38° 59′ 27″
- Distance: c. 3 billion ly
- Redshift: 0.16
- Total energy output: 6 × 10^{49} erg
- Other designations: GRB 050709
- Related media on Commons

GRB 050709 was a gamma-ray burst (GRB) detected on July 9, 2005. A gamma-ray burst is a highly luminous flash of gamma rays, the most energetic form of electromagnetic radiation, which is often followed by a longer-lived "afterglow" emitting at longer wavelengths (X-ray, ultraviolet, optical, infrared, and radio).

== Observations ==
GRB 050709 was detected by multiple instruments on board HETE-2 on July 9, 2005 at 22:36:37 UTC. The first pulse lasted 100 milliseconds, followed 30 seconds later by a fainter pulse lasting approximately 150 seconds. The disparity between the spectra of the first pulse and the second suggest that the second pulse was the onset of the burst's afterglow. As such, this burst was classified as a short-duration hard burst.

A radio source was detected on July 11 at a position of R.A.=23^{h} 01^{m} 32.1^{s}, Decl.=−38° 59′ 27″. Optical observations taken 34 hours after the burst revealed an optical afterglow. This was the first discovery of transient optical emission from a short burst.

== Ejecta ==
Analysis of the burst's afterglows suggested two models to explain the burst's afterglow. In the first, the burst's ejecta were collimated into a jet with a half-angle greater than 6° and interacted with a high-density medium. In the second, the jet had a half-angle greater than 2° and interacted with a low-density medium. If the characteristics of the first model, which were similar to those of GRB 050724, are representative of all short GRBs, then the emission jets of short GRBs are less collimated and less energetic than those of long GRBs.

== Host galaxy ==
GRB 050709's x-ray afterglow associated the burst with a host galaxy at a redshift of z = 0.16. This galaxy's light curve excluded the possibility of a supernova association, a common feature of long bursts. This suggested that short-duration bursts release much less energy than long-duration bursts.
