= Gamma-Ray Burst Optical/Near-Infrared Detector =

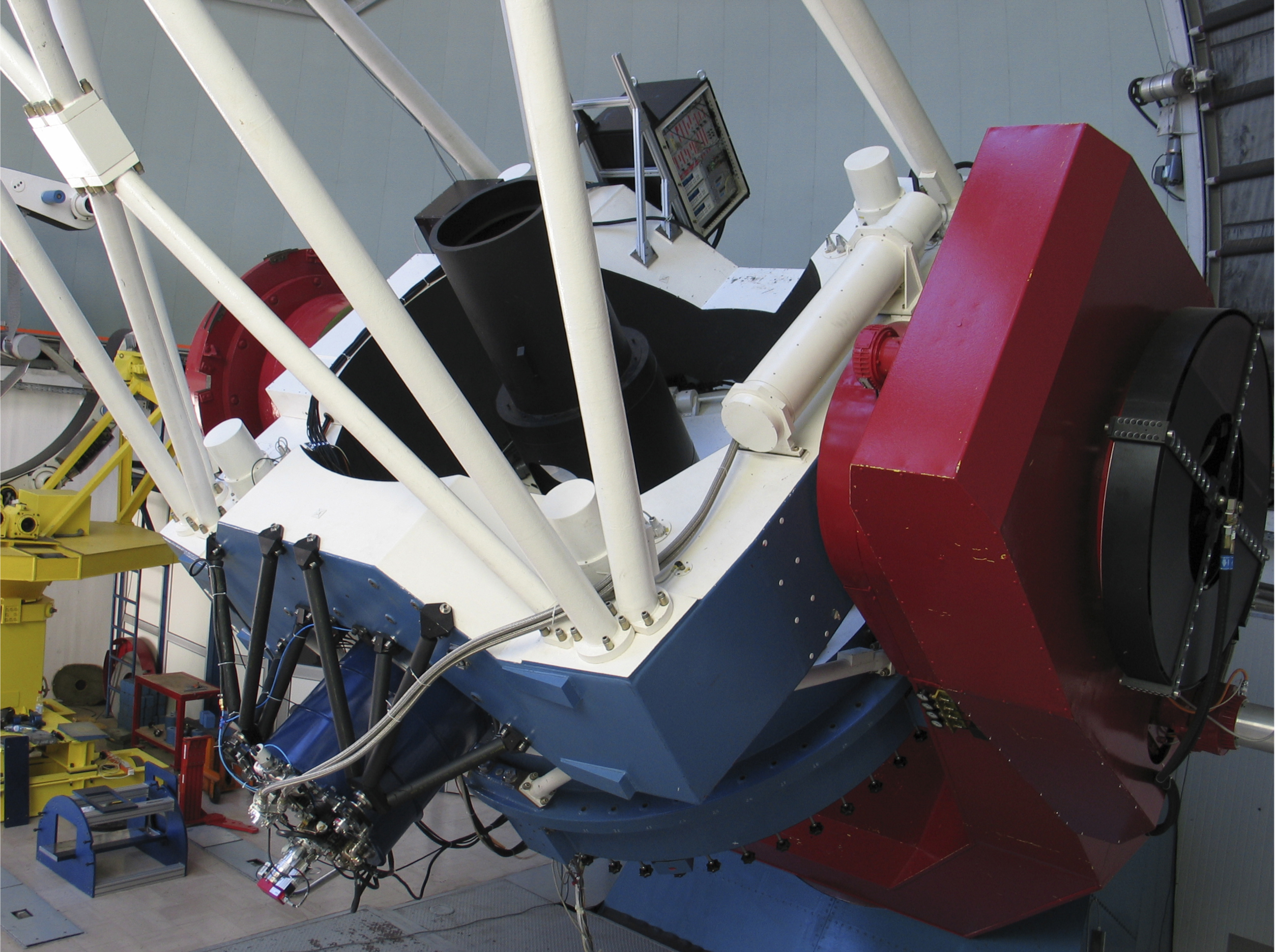
GROND mounted on the MPG/ESO telescope (a dark blue cylinder at the lower left)

The Gamma-Ray Burst Optical/Near-Infrared Detector (GROND) is an imaging instrument used to investigate Gamma-Ray Burst afterglows and for doing follow-up observations on exoplanets using transit photometry. It is operated at the 2.2-metre MPG/ESO telescope at ESO's La Silla Observatory in the southern part of the Atacama desert, about 600 kilometres north of Santiago de Chile and at an altitude of 2,400 metres.

== Discoveries ==
- On 13 September 2008, Swift detected gamma-ray burst 080913. GROND and VLT subsequently placed the GRB at 12.8 Gly distant, making it the most-distant GRB observed, as well as the second-most-distant object to be spectroscopically confirmed.
- On 15 September 2008, NASA's Fermi Gamma-ray Space Telescope detected gamma-ray burst 080916C. On 19 February 2009, NASA announced that the GROND team's work shows that the GRB was the most energetic yet observed, and 12.2 Gly distant.

== See also ==
- Red shift observations in astronomy
- Photometry (astronomy)
- Max Planck Institute for Extraterrestrial Physics
