= HETE 2 =

NASA satellite of the Explorer program

High Energy Transient Explorer 2
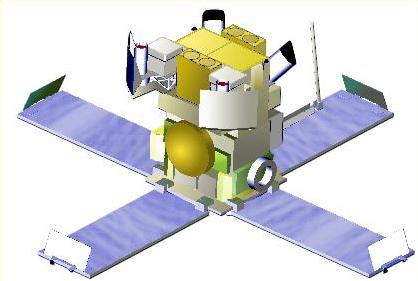
- HETE-2 satellite
- Names: Explorer 79; HETE-2
- Mission type: High-energy astronomy
- Operator: NASA
- COSPAR ID: 2000-061A
- SATCAT no.: 26561
- Mission duration: 18 months (planned); 7.5 years (achieved)

Spacecraft properties
- Spacecraft: Explorer LXXIX
- Spacecraft type: High Energy Transient Explorer
- Bus: HETE
- Manufacturer: Massachusetts Institute of Technology
- Launch mass: 124 kg (273 lb)
- Dimensions: 100 × 50 × 50 cm (39 × 20 × 20 in)
- Power: 168 watts

Start of mission
- Launch date: 9 October 2000, 05:38:18 UTC
- Rocket: Pegasus-H (F30)
- Launch site: Kwajalein Atoll
- Contractor: Orbital Sciences Corporation

End of mission
- Deactivated: March 2008

Orbital parameters
- Reference system: Geocentric orbit
- Regime: Low Earth orbit
- Perigee altitude: 590 km (370 mi)
- Apogee altitude: 650 km (400 mi)
- Inclination: 1.95°
- Period: 95.70 minutes

Instruments
- French Gamma Telescope (FREGATE); Soft X-ray Camera (SXC); Wide Field X-Ray Monitor (WXM)

High Energy Transient Explorer 2 (HETE-2; also known as Explorer 79) was a NASA astronomical satellite with international participation (mainly Japan and France). The satellite bus for the first HETE-1 was designed and built by AeroAstro, Inc. of Herndon, Virginia and was lost during launch on 4 November 1996; the replacement satellite, HETE-2 was built by Massachusetts Institute of Technology (MIT) based on the original HETE design.

== International participation ==
The PI Institution at MIT is the headquarters for the HETE-2 Team; however, team members in science, instrument, and engineering are global.

Participating institutions with HETE-2 team members include the following:

- MIT, Center for Space Research (MIT/CSR) in Cambridge, Massachusetts — main investigator for HETE-2; George Ricker. MIT built and tested the spacecraft bus, the satellite control software, the primary ground station at Kwajalein Atoll, and the burst alert stations in the Galápagos, Ascension, Gabon, Kwajalein Atoll, and Kiribati. MIT/CSR designed and built the optical camera and soft X-ray camera systems for the HETE-2 project; these instruments used MIT Lincoln Lab CCD sensors.
- Los Alamos National Laboratory (LANL), Los Alamos, New Mexico – designed and built the WXM coded aperture and WXM flight and ground support software.
- University of California, Berkeley Space Sciences Laboratory (SSL), Berkeley, California – responsible for Fregate instrument data analysis and instrument health software, as well as SXC software effort.
- University of California, Santa Cruz (UCSC), Santa Cruz, California – aided in the design and construction of the spacecraft and ground control systems.
- University of Chicago, Illinois – responsible for gamma-ray burst localization methods and sophisticated spectrum analysis tools.
- Centre d'Étude Spatiale des Rayonnements (CESR), Toulouse, France – responsible for Fregate flight software, operations, and on-orbit commands. The Hiva Oa and Cayenne burst alert stations are also theirs.
- Centre Nationale d'Études Spatiales (CNES), Toulouse – built and tested the GPS required to provide precise timing and orbital elements for HETE-2.
- École Nationale Supérieure de l'Aéronautique et de l'Espace (Sup'Aero), Toulouse – constructed Cayenne's primary ground station.
- Instituto Nacional de Pesquisas Espaciais (INPE), São José dos Campos, Brazil – Joao Braga of INPE, a scientific collaborator on the HETE-2 team, oversees the Burst Alert Station located in Natal, Rio Grande do Norte, Brazil.
- Tata Institute of Fundamental Research (TIFR), Mumbai, India – TIFR's Ravi Manchanda is in charge of the Burst Alert Station in Bangalore.
- Consiglio Nazionale delle Ricerche (CNR), Bologna, Italy – Graziella Pizzichini of TESRE in Bologna guided the HETE-2 team and manages the Burst Alert Station in Malindi, Kenya.
- Institute for Chemistry and Physics (RIKEN), Wakō, Saitama, Japan – built and tested the WXM hardware, built the principal ground station at NUS, and are responsible for the burst alert stations in Palau and Singapore. They also work with Miyazaki University to command and maintain the WXM instrument in orbit.

== History ==
After the launch mishap of HETE-1, NASA agreed to rebuild the satellite using flight spares. The funding for HETE-2 was approved in July 1997, and construction began at MIT in mid-1997. Prior experiences including observations of GRBs in early 1997 by BeppoSAX and ground-based telescopes indicated that "the effect of background electrons and protons would have a profound effect on the observing efficiency and lifetime of HETE-2's X-ray instruments". As a result, the UV cameras were removed, two of which were replaced with a CCD-based coded-aperture imager (Soft X-ray Camera or SXC). The other two were replaced with optical CCD cameras, which serve as star trackers on HETE-2. NASA agreed in 1998 that HETE-2 would fly in an equatorial orbit.

The HETE-2 satellite was completed in January 2000, and was fully tested and in ready state at Vandenberg Air Force Base in California. The plan was to ferry the satellite to Kwajalein Atoll for a 28 January 2000 launch; however, on 14 January 2000, NASA postponed the launch over concerns of not having everything comfortably in place prior to launch time. Among the contributing factors was NASA's concern that neither of the HETE-2's backup stations (Cayenne, French Guiana; Singapore) were fully operational. The Cayenne station needed approval for export from the International Traffic in Arms Regulations (ITAR) (U.S. State Department) which meant it would not come online until a week prior to the scheduled launch, whereas the Singapore station may not be available until after the scheduled launch date. The need for ample telemetry contact with HETE-2 during the critical early phases of the mission served to heighten concern over ground station availability. Without it, they could not properly respond to, avoid or minimize, any unforeseen satellite activation difficulties, such as those encountered by a number of prior NASA-launched missions. Another determining factor in the postponement was the reservation date of 28 January – 8 February for HETE-2's launch at Kwajalein Missile Range (KMR). NASA rescheduled the first launch at KMR in favor of a mid-May time frame. They also determined that the extra time would allow for the HETE-2 satellite to be returned to the East Coast for additional simulations and further testing to enhance the likelihood of a successful mission. A limited budget and "single string" designs for HETE-2's major systems placed practical limits on the level of performance testing that could be performed to increase reliability. A 1000-hour thermal vacuum cycle (1.5 times longer than HETE-2's pre-shipment thermal vacuum testing, and 1/4 of the required mission life) were among the additional shock and vibration tests.

HETE-2 was successfully launched on 9 October 2000.

== Mission ==
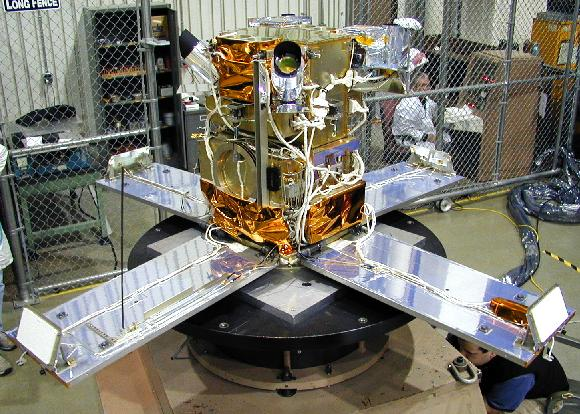
HETE-2 under test

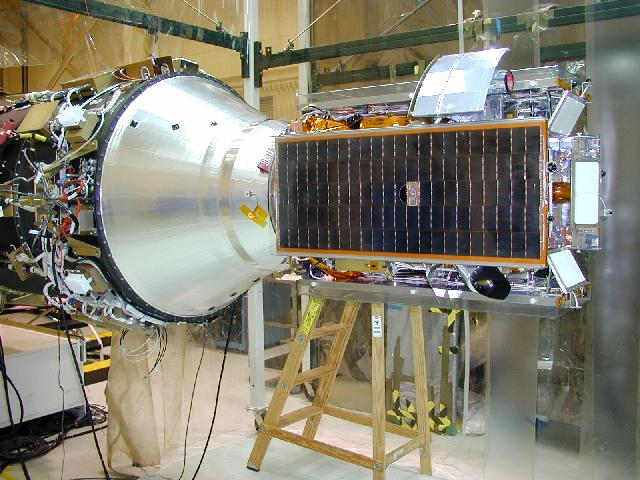
HETE-2 attached to its Pegasus launcher

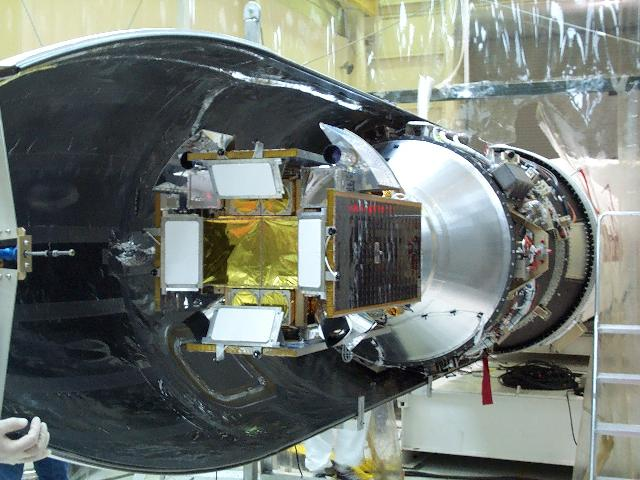
Implementation of the launcher fairing

The prime objective of HETE-2 was to carry out the first multi-wavelength study of gamma-ray bursts (GRB) with ultraviolet (UV), X-ray, and gamma-ray instruments mounted on a single, compact spacecraft. A unique feature of the HETE mission was its capability to localize GRBs with ~10 arcseconds accuracy in near real time aboard the spacecraft, and to transmit these positions directly to a network of receivers at existing ground-based observatories enabling rapid, sensitive follow-up studies in the radio, infrared (IR), and visible light bands. The High Energy Transient Explorer 2 (HETE-2) is designed to help determine their origin and nature.

== Spacecraft ==
The spacecraft is basically a rectangular cube, roughly 100 × 50 × 50 cm (39 × 20 × 20 in), with four solar panel petals protruding from the bottom. The bottom section of the spacecraft holds the power, communications, and attitude control and the upper section the science instruments. Power is supplied by the solar panels, which are made of honeycomb aluminum with a silicon substrate, each supplying 42 W. There are 6 battery packs, each containing 24 1.5 V NiCd cells, each with 1.2 A-hr capacity. Communication is via S-band uplink (2.092 GHz) and downlink (2.272 GHz) using 5 dual-patch antennas. A very high frequency (VHF) downlink (137.9622 MHz) was used for the real-time burst alerts via a whip antenna mounted on one of the solar panels. Attitude control is achieved by a momentum wheel and three orthogonal magnetic torque coils, controlled by inputs from two magnetometers, twelve Sun sensors, and an optical camera.

== Instruments ==
The satellite has three instruments: 1) a set of wide-field gamma-ray (6-400 keV) spectrometers (FREGATE); 2) a wide-field X-ray (2-25 keV) monitor (WXM), and 3) a set of soft X-ray (0.5-10 keV) cameras (SXC). These instruments cover a solid angle of 1.5-2 steradians and will be used to make simultaneous, broad-band observations in the various listed energy ranges. The goal of the mission is to continuously scan the sky and identify occurrences of GRBs, establish precise locations and transmit coordinates in near real time (< 10 seconds). The instruments will also be used to establish relative GRB rates and intensities in the soft X-ray, mid X-ray, and gamma-ray bands, perform spectroscopy of gamma-ray bursts in the energy range 1-400 keV, measure the intensities, time histories, and spectra of soft gamma-ray repeater bursts, X-ray bursts, and black hole X-ray transients.

== Experiments ==
=== French Gamma Telescope (FREGATE) ===
The French Gamma Telescope (FREGATE) is a set of omnidirectional gamma-ray spectrometers designed to detect and conduct spectroscopy on gamma-ray bursts. The instrument covers an energy range of 6 to 400 keV with a spectral resolution of ~25% at 20 keV and ~9% at 662 keV. The field of view is 3 steradians and the timing resolution is 10 microseconds.

=== Soft X-ray Camera (SXC) ===
The Soft X-Ray Camera (SXC) is designed to detect gamma-ray bursts and to measure the intensities, time variation, and spectra of X-ray bursts and black hole X-ray transients. The SXC consists of two orthogonal sets of one-dimensional coded aperture X-ray imagers. The imagers cover an X-ray range from 0.5 to 14 keV with a spectral resolution of 46 eV at 525 eV and 129 eV at 5.9 keV. The field of view is 0.91 steradians and the timing resolution is 1.2 seconds.

=== Wide Field X-Ray Monitor (WXM) ===
The Wide Field X-Ray Monitor (WXM) on HETE-2 is designed to measure the intensities, time variation, and spectra of X-ray bursts and black hole X-ray transients. The WXM consists of two orthogonal one-dimensional X-ray detectors covering an energy range of 2 to 25 keV. The spectral resolution is ~22% at 8 keV and 90% at 5 keV. The field of view is 1.6 steradians and the timing resolution is 1 millisecond.

== Launch ==
HETE-2 was launched on 9 October 2000, at 05:38:18 UTC, in a follow-up mission. It was similar to the first HETE, but replaced the UV camera with an additional X-ray camera (Soft X-ray Camera or SXC) capable of higher localization accuracy than the original X-ray instrument (Wide-Field X-ray Monitor or WXM). HETE-2 was placed in a 590 × 650 km (370 × 400 mi) elliptical Earth orbit. The spacecraft was always pointed in the anti-solar direction and all bursts detected was at least 120° from the Sun. The field of view was centered roughly on the ecliptic. Over the course of a year approximately 60% of the sky was surveyed. When GRB's are detected, summary burst data are sent immediately to listen-only equatorial ground stations and are forwarded to observers via the GRB coordinates network within less than 10 seconds of burst detection. The planned operating life is 18 months with probable mission extensions for an additional 6 months or more. With an inclination of 1.95°.

== Achievements ==
Among the achievements of the HETE-2 mission are:

- The discovery of GRB 030329, a widely observed, nearby gamma ray burst, firmly connecting GRBs with supernovas.
- The discovery of GRB 050709, which was the first short/hard GRB to be found with an optical counterpart, leading to a firm establishment of the cosmological origin of this subclass of GRBs.
- Dark bursts, or GRBs previously thought to have no optical counterparts, are not completely optically dark. Some of these dark GRBs fade in the optical very rapidly, others are dimmer but detectable with large (meter class) telescopes.
- The establishment of another subclass of GRBs, the less energetic X-Ray Flashes (XRF), and its first optical counterpart.
- The first to send out arcminute positions of GRBs to the observation community within tens of seconds of the onset of GRB (and in a few instances, while the burst was ongoing).

== Burst alert summary ==
The HETE-2 website lists 6 GRBs in 2001, 19 in 2002, 25 in 2003, 19 in 2004, 12 in 2005, and 3 in 2006 - the last reported being in March 2006.

The trigger summaries list 2 GRBs in May 2006 and an XRB in Jan 2007.

== Latest status ==
As of March 2007, "the operational efficiency of the HETE-2 spacecraft and instruments has decreased due to the advanced age of the nickel–cadmium batteries (NiCd) on board".

The mission ended in March 2008.

== See also ==
Explorer program
