= Orders of magnitude (energy) =

Comparison of a large range of energies

This list compares various energies in joules (J), organized by order of magnitude.

== Below 1 J ==
List of orders of magnitude for energy
Factor (joules)	SI prefix	Value	Item
10^{−35}		1×10^{−35} J	Optical dipole potential measured in a tune-out experiment with ultracold metastable helium.
10^{−34}		6.626×10^{−34} J	Energy of a photon with a frequency of 1 hertz., equivalent to 4.14×10^{−15} eV or, alternatively stated, One two-hundred-fifty-trillionth of one eV.)
10^{−34}		8×10^{−34} J	Average kinetic energy of translational motion of a molecule at the lowest temperature reached (38 picokelvin as of 2021)
10^{−30}	quecto- (qJ)		
10^{−28}		6.6×10^{−28} J	Energy of a typical AM radio photon (1 MHz) (4×10^{−9} eV)
10^{−27}	ronto- (rJ)		
10^{−24}	yocto- (yJ)	1.6×10^{−24} J	Energy of a typical microwave oven photon (2.45 GHz) (1×10^{−5} eV)
10^{−23}		2×10^{−23} J	Average kinetic energy of translational motion of a molecule in the Boomerang Nebula, the coldest place known outside of a laboratory, at a temperature of 1 kelvin
10^{−22}		2×10^{−22} – 3×10^{−19} J	Energy of infrared light photons
10^{−21}	zepto- (zJ)	1.7×10^{−21} J	1 kJ/mol, converted to energy per molecule
10^{−21}	zepto- (zJ)	2.1×10^{−21} J	Thermal energy in each degree of freedom of a molecule at 25 °C (kT/2) (0.01 eV)
10^{−21}	zepto- (zJ)	2.856×10^{−21} J	By Landauer's principle, the minimum amount of energy required at 25 °C to change one bit of information
10^{−21}	zepto- (zJ)	3–7×10^{−21} J	Energy of a van der Waals interaction between atoms (0.02–0.04 eV)
10^{−21}	zepto- (zJ)	4.1×10^{−21} J	The "kT" constant at 25 °C, a common rough approximation for the total thermal energy of each molecule in a system (0.03 eV)
10^{−21}	zepto- (zJ)	7–22×10^{−21} J	Energy of a hydrogen bond (0.04 to 0.13 eV)
10^{−20}		4.5×10^{−20} J	Upper bound of the mass–energy of a neutrino in particle physics (0.28 eV)
10^{−19}		1.602176634×10^{−19} J	1 electronvolt (eV) by definition. This value is exact as a result of the 2019 revision of SI units.
10^{−19}		3–5×10^{−19} J	Energy range of photons in visible light (≈1.6–3.1 eV)
10^{−19}		3–14×10^{−19} J	Energy of a covalent bond (2–9 eV)
10^{−19}		5×10^{−19} – 2×10^{−17} J	Energy of ultraviolet light photons
10^{−18}	atto- (aJ)	1.78×10^{−18} J	Bond dissociation energy for the carbon monoxide (CO) triple bond, alternatively stated: 1072 kJ/mol; 11.11 eV per molecule. This is the strongest chemical bond known.
10^{−18}	atto- (aJ)	2.18×10^{−18} J	Ground state ionization energy of hydrogen (13.6 eV)
10^{−17}		2×10^{−17} – 2×10^{−14} J	Energy range of X-ray photons
10^{−16}			
10^{−15}	femto- (fJ)	3 × 10^{−15} J	Average kinetic energy of one human red blood cell.
10^{−14}		1×10^{−14} J	Sound energy (vibration) transmitted to the eardrums by listening to a whisper for one second.
10^{−14}		> 2×10^{−14} J	Energy of gamma ray photons
10^{−14}		2.7×10^{−14} J	Upper bound of the mass–energy of a muon neutrino
10^{−14}		8.2×10^{−14} J	Rest mass–energy of an electron (0.511 MeV)
10^{−13}		1.6×10^{−13} J	1 megaelectronvolt (MeV)
10^{−13}		2.3×10^{−13} J	Energy released by a single event of two protons fusing into deuterium (1.44 MeV)
10^{−12}	pico- (pJ)	2.3×10^{−12} J	Kinetic energy of neutrons produced by DT fusion, used to trigger fission (14.1 MeV)
10^{−11}		1.3646×10^{−11} J	Energy consumed for one floating-point operation by KAIROS, the most energy-efficient supercomputer as of November 2025
10^{−11}		3.4×10^{−11} J	Average total energy released in the nuclear fission of one uranium-235 atom (215 MeV)
10^{−10}		1.492×10^{−10} J	Mass-energy equivalent of 1 Da (931.5 MeV)
10^{−10}		1.503×10^{−10} J	Rest mass–energy of a proton (938.3 MeV)
10^{−10}		1.505×10^{−10} J	Rest mass–energy of a neutron (939.6 MeV)
10^{−10}		1.6×10^{−10} J	1 gigaelectronvolt (GeV)
10^{−10}		3×10^{−10} J	Rest mass–energy of a deuteron
10^{−10}		6×10^{−10} J	Rest mass–energy of an alpha particle
10^{−10}		7×10^{−10} J	Energy required to raise a grain of sand by 0.1 mm (the thickness of a piece of paper).
10^{−9}	nano- (nJ)	1.6×10^{−9} J	10 GeV
10^{−9}	nano- (nJ)	8×10^{−9} J	Initial operating energy per beam of the CERN Large Electron Positron Collider in 1989 (50 GeV)
10^{−8}		1.3×10^{−8} J	Mass–energy of a W boson (80.4 GeV)
10^{−8}		1.5×10^{−8} J	Mass–energy of a Z boson (91.2 GeV)
10^{−8}		1.6×10^{−8} J	100 GeV
10^{−8}		2×10^{−8} J	Mass–energy of the Higgs Boson (125.1 GeV)
10^{−8}		6.4×10^{−8} J	Operating energy per proton of the CERN Super Proton Synchrotron accelerator in 1976
10^{−7}		1×10^{−7} J	≡ 1 erg
10^{−7}		1.6×10^{−7} J	1 TeV (teraelectronvolt), about the kinetic energy of a flying mosquito
10^{−6}	micro- (μJ)	1.04×10^{−6} J	Energy per proton in the CERN Large Hadron Collider in 2015 (6.5 TeV)
10^{−5}			
10^{−4}		1.0×10^{−4} J	Energy released by a typical radioluminescent wristwatch in 1 hour (1 μCi × 4.871 MeV × 1 hr)
10^{−3}	milli- (mJ)	3.0×10^{−3} J	Energy released by a P100 atomic battery in 1 hour (2.4 V × 350 nA × 1 hr)
10^{−2}	centi- (cJ)	4.0×10^{−2} J	Use of a typical LED for 1 second (2.0 V × 20 mA × 1 s)
10^{−1}	deci- (dJ)	1.1×10^{−1} J	Energy of an American half-dollar falling 1 metre

== 1 to 10^{5} J ==
List of orders of magnitude for energy
Factor (joules)	SI prefix	Value	Item
10^{0}	J	1 J	≡ 1 N·m (newton–metre)
10^{0}	J	1 J	≡ 1 W·s (watt-second)
10^{0}	J	1 J	Kinetic energy produced as an extra small apple (~100 grams) falls 1 meter against Earth's gravity
10^{0}	J	1 J	Energy required to heat 1 gram of dry, cool air by 1 degree Celsius
10^{0}	J	1.4 J	≈ 1 ft·lbf (foot-pound force)
10^{0}	J	4.184 J	≡ 1 thermochemical calorie (small calorie)
10^{0}	J	4.1868 J	≡ 1 International (Steam) Table calorie
10^{0}	J	8 J	Greisen-Zatsepin-Kuzmin theoretical upper limit for the energy of a cosmic ray coming from a distant source
10^{1}	deca- (daJ)	10 J	Flash energy of a typical pocket camera electronic flash capacitor (100–400 μF at 330 V)
10^{1}	deca- (daJ)	50 J	The most energetic cosmic ray ever detected.
10^{2}	hecto- (hJ)	1.25×10^{2} J	Kinetic energy of a regulation (standard) baseball (5.1 oz / 140 g) thrown at average MLB pitch speed (93 mph / 150 km/h).
10^{2}	hecto- (hJ)	1.5×10^{2} - 3.6×10^{2} J	Energy delivered by a biphasic external electric shock (defibrillation), usually during adult cardiopulmonary resuscitation for cardiac arrest.
10^{2}	hecto- (hJ)	3×10^{2} J	Energy of a lethal dose of X-rays
10^{2}	hecto- (hJ)	3×10^{2} J	Kinetic energy of an average person jumping as high as they can
10^{2}	hecto- (hJ)	3.3×10^{2} J	Energy to melt 1 g of ice
10^{2}	hecto- (hJ)	3.6×10^{2} J	Kinetic energy of 800-gram standard men's javelin thrown at 30 m/s by elite javelin throwers
10^{2}	hecto- (hJ)	5×10^{2} – 2×10^{3} J	Energy output of a typical photography studio strobe light in a single flash
10^{2}	hecto- (hJ)	6×10^{2} J	Use of a 10-watt flashlight for 1 minute
10^{2}	hecto- (hJ)	7.5×10^{2} J	A power of 1 horsepower applied for 1 second
10^{2}	hecto- (hJ)	7.8×10^{2} J	Kinetic energy of 7.26 kg standard men's shot thrown at 14.7 m/s by the world record holder Randy Barnes
10^{2}	hecto- (hJ)	8.01×10^{2} J	Amount of work needed to lift a man with an average weight (81.7 kg) one meter above Earth (or any planet with Earth gravity)
10^{3}	kilo- (kJ)	1.1×10^{3} J	≈ 1 British thermal unit (BTU), depending on the temperature
10^{3}	kilo- (kJ)	1.4×10^{3} J	Total solar radiation received from the Sun by 1 square meter at the altitude of Earth's orbit per second (solar constant)
10^{3}	kilo- (kJ)	2.3×10^{3} J	Energy to vaporize 1 g of water into steam
10^{3}	kilo- (kJ)	3×10^{3} J	Lorentz force can crusher pinch
10^{3}	kilo- (kJ)	3.4×10^{3} J	Kinetic energy of world-record men's hammer throw (7.26 kg thrown at 30.7 m/s in 1986)
10^{3}	kilo- (kJ)	3.6×10^{3} J	≡ 1 W·h (watt-hour)
10^{3}	kilo- (kJ)	4.2×10^{3} J	Energy released by explosion of 1 gram of TNT
10^{3}	kilo- (kJ)	4.2×10^{3} J	≈ 1 food Calorie (large calorie)
10^{3}	kilo- (kJ)	~7×10^{3} J	Muzzle energy of an elephant gun, e.g. firing a .458 Winchester Magnum
10^{3}	kilo- (kJ)	8.5×10^{3} J	Kinetic energy of a regulation baseball thrown at the speed of sound (343 m/s = 767 mph = 1,235 km/h. Air, 20 °C).
10^{3}	kilo- (kJ)	9×10^{3} J	Energy in an alkaline AA battery
10^{4}		1.7×10^{4} J	Energy released by the metabolism of 1 gram of carbohydrates or protein
10^{4}		3.8×10^{4} J	Energy released by the metabolism of 1 gram of fat
10^{4}		4–5×10^{4} J	Energy released by the combustion of 1 gram of gasoline
10^{4}		5×10^{4} J	Kinetic energy of 1 gram of matter moving at 10 km/s
10^{5}		3×10^{5} – 1.5×10^{6} J	Kinetic energy of an automobile at highway speeds (1 to 5 tons at 89 km/h or 55 mph)

== 10^{6} to 10^{11} J ==
List of orders of magnitude for energy
Factor (joules)	SI prefix	Value	Item
10^{6}	mega- (MJ)	1×10^{6} J	Kinetic energy of a 2-tonne vehicle at 32 metres per second (115 km/h or 72 mph)
10^{6}	mega- (MJ)	1.2×10^{6} J	Approximate food energy of a snack such as a Snickers bar (280 food calories)
10^{6}	mega- (MJ)	3.6×10^{6} J	= 1 kWh (kilowatt-hour) (used for electricity)
10^{6}	mega- (MJ)	4.2×10^{6} J	Energy released by explosion of 1 kilogram of TNT
10^{6}	mega- (MJ)	6.1×10^{6} J	Kinetic energy of the 4 kg tungsten APFSDS penetrator after being fired from a 120 mm KE-W A1 cartridge with a nominal muzzle velocity of 1740 m/s.
10^{6}	mega- (MJ)	8.4×10^{6} J	Recommended food energy intake per day for a moderately active woman (2000 food calories)
10^{6}	mega- (MJ)	9.1×10^{6} J	Kinetic energy of a regulation baseball thrown at Earth's escape velocity (First cosmic velocity ≈ 11.186 km/s = 25,020 mph = 40,270 km/h).
10^{7}		1×10^{7} J	Kinetic energy of the armor-piercing round fired by the ISU-152 assault gun
10^{7}		1.1×10^{7} J	Recommended food energy intake per day for a moderately active man (2600 food calories)
10^{7}		3.3×10^{7} J	Kinetic energy of a 10 kg (23 lb) projectile fired by the Navy's Mach 8 railgun.
10^{7}		3.7×10^{7} J	$1 of electricity at a cost of $0.10/kWh (the US average retail cost in 2009)
10^{7}		4×10^{7} J	Energy from the combustion of 1 cubic meter of natural gas
10^{7}		4.2×10^{7} J	Caloric energy consumed by Olympian Michael Phelps on a daily basis during Olympic training
10^{7}		6.3×10^{7} J	Theoretical minimum energy required to accelerate 1 kg of matter to escape velocity from Earth's surface (ignoring atmosphere)
10^{7}		9×10^{7} J	Total mass-energy of 1 microgram of matter (25 kWh)
10^{8}		1×10^{8} J	Kinetic energy of a 55-tonne aircraft at typical landing speed (59 m/s or 115 knots)
10^{8}		1.1×10^{8} J	≈ 1 therm, depending on the temperature
10^{8}		1.1×10^{8} J	≈ 1 Tour de France, or ~90 hours ridden at 5 W/kg by a 65 kg rider
10^{8}		7.3×10^{8} J	≈ Energy from burning 16 kilograms of oil (using 135 kg per barrel of light crude)
10^{9}	giga- (GJ)	1×10^{9} J	Energy in an average lightning bolt (thunder)
10^{9}	giga- (GJ)	1.1×10^{9} J	Magnetic stored energy in the world's largest toroidal superconducting magnet for the ATLAS experiment at CERN, Geneva
10^{9}	giga- (GJ)	1.2×10^{9} J	Inflight 100-ton Boeing 757-200 at 300 knots (154 m/s)
10^{9}	giga- (GJ)	1.4×10^{9} J	Theoretical minimum amount of energy required to melt a tonne of steel (380 kWh)
10^{9}	giga- (GJ)	1.77×10^{9} J	Theoretical minimum energy required for a 1 kg object on Jupiter to accelerate to Jupiter's escape velocity and thus leave its gravity well.
10^{9}	giga- (GJ)	2×10^{9} J	Combustion energy of 61 litres (16 US gal) of gasoline in a standard fuel tank of a car.
10^{9}	giga- (GJ)	2×10^{9} J	Derived unit of energy in Planck units, roughly the diesel tank energy of a mid-sized truck. Its mass-equivalent is the Planck mass.
10^{9}	giga- (GJ)	2.49×10^{9} J	Approximate kinetic energy carried by American Airlines Flight 11 at the moment of impact with WTC 1 on September 11, 2001.
10^{9}	giga- (GJ)	3×10^{9} J	Inflight 125-ton Boeing 767-200 flying at 373 knots (192 m/s)
10^{9}	giga- (GJ)	3.3×10^{9} J	Approximate average amount of energy expended by a human heart muscle over an 80-year lifetime
10^{9}	giga- (GJ)	3.6×10^{9} J	= 1 MW·h (megawatt-hour)
10^{9}	giga- (GJ)	4.2×10^{9} J	Energy released by explosion of 1 ton of TNT.
10^{9}	giga- (GJ)	4.5×10^{9} J	Average annual energy usage of a standard refrigerator
10^{9}	giga- (GJ)	6.1×10^{9} J	≈ 1 bboe (barrel of oil equivalent)
10^{10}		1.9×10^{10} J	Kinetic energy of an Airbus A380 at cruising speed (560 tonnes at 511 knots or 263 m/s)
10^{10}		4.2×10^{10} J	≈ 1 toe (ton of oil equivalent)
10^{10}		4.6×10^{10} J	Yield energy of a Massive Ordnance Air Blast bomb (MOAB), the second most powerful non-nuclear weapon ever designed (11 tons of TNT)
10^{10}		7.3×10^{10} J	Energy consumed by the average US automobile in the year 2000
10^{10}		8.6×10^{10} J	≈ 1 MW·d (megawatt-day), used in the context of power plants (24 MW·h)
10^{10}		8.8×10^{10} J	Total energy released in the nuclear fission of one gram of uranium-235
10^{10}		9×10^{10} J	Total mass-energy of 1 milligram of matter (25 MW·h)
10^{11}		1.1×10^{11} J	Kinetic energy of a regulation baseball thrown at lightning speed (120 km/s = 270,000 mph = 435,000 km/h).
10^{11}		1.84×10^{11} J	Yield energy of the Father of All Bombs (FOAB), the most energetic conventional weapon (44 tons of TNT).
10^{11}		2.4×10^{11} J	Approximate food energy consumed by an average human in an 80-year lifetime.

== 10^{12} to 10^{17} J ==
List of orders of magnitude for energy
Factor (joules)	SI prefix	Value	Item
10^{12}	tera- (TJ)	1.85×10^{12} J	Gravitational potential energy of the Twin Towers, combined, accumulated throughout their construction and released during the collapse of the complex.
10^{12}	tera- (TJ)	3.4×10^{12} J	Maximum fuel energy of an Airbus A330-300 (97,530 liters of Jet A-1)
10^{12}	tera- (TJ)	3.6×10^{12} J	1 GW·h (gigawatt-hour)
10^{12}	tera- (TJ)	4×10^{12} J	Electricity generated by one 20-kg CANDU fuel bundle assuming ~29% thermal efficiency of reactor
10^{12}	tera- (TJ)	4.2×10^{12} J	Chemical energy released by the detonation of 1 kiloton of TNT
10^{12}	tera- (TJ)	6.4×10^{12} J	Energy contained in jet fuel in a Boeing 747-100B aircraft at max fuel capacity (183,380 liters of Jet A-1)
10^{12}	tera- (TJ)	~5.44×10^{1}^{1}-8.4×10^{12} J	Range of the energy of the Beirut explosion in 2020 (0.13-2 kt)
10^{13}		1.1×10^{13} J	Energy of the maximum fuel an Airbus A380 can carry (320,000 liters of Jet A-1)
10^{13}		1.2×10^{13} J	Orbital kinetic energy of the International Space Station (417 tonnes at 7.7 km/s)
10^{13}		1.20×10^{13} J	Orbital kinetic energy of the Parker Solar Probe as it dives deep into the Sun's gravity well in December 2024, reaching a peak velocity of 430,000 mph.
10^{13}		~1.21×10^{13} J	Energy released by the Halifax explosion (2.9 kt) in 1917
10^{13}		~4-4.7×10^{13} J	Estimated energy, respectively, of the main fragment and of the entire Kaali impact event (9.6-11.2 kilotons of TNT).
10^{13}		6.3×10^{13} J	Yield of the Little Boy atomic bomb dropped on Hiroshima in World War II (15 kilotons)
10^{13}		8.7×10^{13} J	Modern yield estimates of the Trinity Test, the first U.S. and the first atomic test in history (21 kt)
10^{13}		9×10^{13} J	Theoretical total mass–energy of 1 gram of matter (25 GW·h)
10^{13}		9.2×10^{13} J	Yield of RDS-1, the first soviet atomic test (22 kt)
10^{14}		1.8×10^{14} J	Energy released by annihilation of 1 gram of antimatter and matter (50 GW·h)
10^{14}		2.09×10^{14} J	Upper limit (50 kt) of the energy range of small tactical nuclear weapons (0.1-50 kt)
10^{14}		6×10^{14} J	Energy released by an average hurricane per day
10^{15}	peta- (PJ)	> 10^{15} J	Energy released by a severe thunderstorm
10^{15}	peta- (PJ)	1×10^{15} J	Yearly electricity consumption in Greenland as of 2008
10^{15}	peta- (PJ)	~1.7-2.1×10^{15} J	The best range of the energy (~400-500 kilotons of TNT, ~30 times more energetic of Little Boy) released by the airburst of the Chelyabinsk meteor in 2013
10^{15}	peta- (PJ)	3.5×10^{15} J	Estimated energy of the tsunami in the Indian Ocean in 2004
10^{15}	peta- (PJ)	4.2×10^{15} J	Energy released by explosion of 1 megaton of TNT
10^{15}	peta- (PJ)	6.7×10^{15} J	Yield of RDS-37 (1.6 megaton), the first Soviet two-stage hydrogen bomb test
10^{15}	peta- (PJ)	9.6×10^{15} J	Estimated energy of the tsunami triggered by Krakatoa in 1883
10^{16}		~4.2×10^{15}-8.4×10^{16} J	Range of the estimated energy for the impact that formed Meteor or Barringer Crater, one of the best-preserved impact craters on Earth and the first identified impact crater in the geological history (for simplicity ~1-20 megatons of TNT, ≈ 70–1300 times more energetic of the Little Boy dropped on Hiroshima; its seismic waves at M_{w} 5.2-5.4 (M_{w} 3.3-3.5 at 160 km) would have triggered a landslide at Nankoweap which would have blocked the Colorado river creating the Nankoweap Paleolake.
10^{16}		1.1×10^{16} J	Yearly electricity consumption in Mongolia as of 2010
10^{16}		~2.9×10^{16} J	The estimated energy of the lateral blast (7 megatons) from the 1980 eruption of Mount St. Helens
10^{16}		4.36×10^{16} J	Yield of Ivy Mike, the first U.S. thermonuclear test (10.4 megatons)
10^{16}		6.3×10^{16} J	Yield of Castle Bravo, the most powerful nuclear weapon tested by the United States (15 megatons of TNT)
10^{16}		7.9×10^{16} J	Kinetic energy of a regulation baseball thrown at 99% the speed of light (KE = mc^2 × [γ-1], where the Lorentz factor γ ≈ 7.09).
10^{16}		9×10^{16} J	Mass–energy of 1 kilogram of matter
10^{17}		~4.1-8.3×10^{16}-(1.26×10^{17} J)	The most likely range of the energy in the Tunguska event in 1908, the most remarkable astronomical airburst-impact event in the modern times (~10-30 megatons of TNT, ≈700-2,000 times more energetic of Little Boy dropped on Hiroshima
10^{17}		1×10^{17} J	Estimated energy of the Yilan impact in China (24 megatons of TNT)
10^{17}		1-1.09×10^{17} J	Total energy released by the 1980 eruption of Mount St. Helens as blast and heat (24-26 megatons)
10^{17}		1.4×10^{17} J	Seismic energy released by the 2004 Indian Ocean earthquake
10^{17}		1.7×10^{17} J	Total energy from the Sun that strikes the face of the Earth each second
10^{17}		2.1×10^{17} J	Yield of the Tsar Bomba, the most powerful nuclear weapon ever tested (50 megatons of TNT)
10^{17}		2.552×10^{17} J	Estimated energy of the explosion on 15 January 2022 in the Hunga Tonga–Hunga Haʻapai eruption
10^{17}		4.2×10^{17} J	Yearly electricity consumption of Norway as of 2008
10^{17}		4.516×10^{17} J	Energy needed to accelerate one ton of mass to 0.1 c (~30,000 km/s)
10^{17}		4.184-8.368×10^{17} J	Another estimated energy of the explosion on 15 January 2022 in the Hunga Tonga–Hunga Haʻapai eruption through infrasound and acoustic-gravity waves (100-200 megatons of TNT)
10^{17}		8.4×10^{17} J	Estimated energy released by the eruption of the Indonesian volcano, Krakatoa, in 1883 (200 megatons of TNT)

== 10^{18} to 10^{23} J ==
List of orders of magnitude for energy
Factor (joules)	SI prefix	Value	Item
10^{18}	exa- (EJ)	2×10^{18} J	Another estimated energy of the earthquake that shocked the Indian Ocean in 2004
10^{18}	exa- (EJ)	2.1×10^{18} J	Estimated energy of the megatsunami triggered by the Mjølnir impact event
10^{18}	exa- (EJ)	5.86×10^{18} J	Estimated energy of the Hapcheon impact (1400 megatons), the first impact confirmed impact crater in Korean Peninsula; stromatolites in a hydrothermal environment within such a recent crater could have significant implications for understanding how life might have arisen
10^{18}	exa- (EJ)	5.02-6.80×10^{18} J	Estimated energy of a hypothetical Apophis impact (1200-1625 megatons)
10^{18}	exa- (EJ)	9.4×10^{18} J	Worldwide nuclear-powered electricity output in 2023.
10^{19}		1×10^{19} J	Thermal energy released by the 1991 Pinatubo eruption
10^{19}		1.1×10^{19} J	Seismic energy released by the 1960 Valdivia Earthquake
10^{19}		1.2×10^{19} J	Explosive yield of global nuclear arsenal (2.86 gigatons of TNT)
10^{19}		1.4×10^{19} J	Yearly electricity consumption in the US as of 2009
10^{19}		1.4×10^{19}J	Yearly electricity production in the US as of 2009
10^{19}		~2×10^{19} J	Estimated energy of Nadir impact (5 gigatons of TNT), proposed as part of a binary asteroid or impact cluster together with the same Chicxulub
10^{19}		5×10^{19} J	Energy released in 1 day by an average hurricane in producing rain (400 times greater than the wind energy)
10^{19}		6.4×10^{19} J	Yearly electricity consumption of the world as of 2008
10^{19}		6.8×10^{19} J	Yearly electricity generation of the world as of 2008
10^{20}		1.4×10^{20} J	Total energy released in the 1815 Mount Tambora eruption (30 gigatons of TNT)
10^{20}		2.33×10^{20} J	Kinetic energy of a carbonaceous chondrite meteor 1 km in diameter striking Earth's surface at 20 km/s. Such an impact occurs every ~500,000 years.
10^{20}		2.4×10^{20} J	Total latent heat energy released by Hurricane Katrina
10^{20}		3.35×10^{20} J	Energy released by the Eltanin impact in water (80 gigatons of TNT) assuming 1 km diameter projectile at 20 km/s) which is the only known deep-ocean impact into water, resulting in a megatsunami with height up to 200–300 m
10^{20}		5×10^{20} J	Total world annual energy consumption in 2010
10^{20}		6.2×10^{20} J	World primary energy generation in 2023 (620 EJ).
10^{20}		8×10^{20} J	Estimated global uranium resources for generating electricity 2005
10^{21}	zetta- (ZJ)	~1.26-1.67×10^{21} J	Range of energy of Bosumtwi impact (300,000-400,000 megatons of TNT) assuming an apparent outermost ring of ~27 km.
10^{21}	zetta- (ZJ)	~1.6 × 10^{2}^{1} J	Estimated energy released by the Mjølnir impact event (3.8×10^{5} megatons of TNT), the best impact crater to piece together the hydrodinamic sequence for the impacts which happens into shallow seas; evidence of a megatsunami in the Barents Sea is strongly linked to the impact.
10^{21}	zetta- (ZJ)	~1-2.1×10^{21} J	Range of energy of the Zhamansinh impact (240,000-500,000 megatons of TNT) considering an apparent outermost ring of ~30 km, likely the best preserved complex impact crater known within the past one million years and maybe responsible of global-environmental adjustaments at the Mid-Pleistocene Transition
10^{21}	zetta- (ZJ)	~2.76-3.04×10^{21} J	Range of energy of the Pantasma impact (660,000-727,000 megatons of TNT) assuming an apparent outermost ring of ~35 km
10^{21}	zetta- (ZJ)	~4×10^{21} J	Estimated energy of Araguainha impact (~1 million or 1×10^{6} megatons of TNT), which could have contributed to the permian-triassic extinction releasing ~1,600 gigatons of methane due to direct effects of the impact
10^{21}	zetta- (ZJ)	~5×10^{21} J	Estimated energy (~1.2×10^{6} megatons of TNT) released by the Saqqar impact, the largest known in the arabian peninsula
10^{21}	zetta- (ZJ)	6.9×10^{21} J	Estimated energy contained in the world's natural gas reserves as of 2010
10^{21}	zetta- (ZJ)	7.0×10^{21} J	Thermal energy released by the Toba eruption (1.6 Teratons of TNT)
10^{21}	zetta- (ZJ)	~7.3×10^{21} J	Estimated energy of Chesapeake Bay impact event (1.75 million megatons of TNT) with some possibility that it was part of a multiple impact event together with Popigai impact event and Toms Canyion and some biospheric consequences; the first evidence of distal deposits linked to the impact are found at a distance of 380 km in the site of Paint Hill (Moore County, North Carolina), with sedimentary beds (Mount Helicon Formation, MHF), containing ejecta, lapilli, tsunami layers and even black-carbon glass produced by the thermal wave that incinerated biomasses
10^{21}	zetta- (ZJ)	7.9×10^{21} J	Estimated energy contained in the world's petroleum reserves as of 2010
10^{21}	zetta- (ZJ)	9.3×10^{21} J	Annual net uptake of thermal energy by the global ocean during 2003-2018
10^{22}		1.2×10^{22}J	Seismic energy of a magnitude 11 earthquake on Earth (M 11)
10^{22}		1.3×10^{22} J	Another estimated energy (3.1×10^{6} megatons of TNT) of the Mjølnir impact event
10^{22}		1.5×10^{22}J	Total energy from the Sun that strikes the face of the Earth each day
10^{22}		1.94×10^{22}J	Impact event that formed the Siljan Ring (~4.6 millions of megatons of TNT), the largest impact structure in Europe
10^{22}		2-3×10^{22} J	Estimated energy of Manicougan impact event (4.8–7.2 × 10^{6} megatons of TNT), possibly linked to biospheric consequences and proposed as part of a multiple-impact event, a hypotesis less likely according to recent works
10^{22}		~2.18×10^{22} J	Estimated energy of Acraman impact event (~5.2 × 10^{6} megatons of TNT) with possible biospheric consequences; the first direct dating at 585±15 Ma correlate it to the medium Edicarian, in the middle edicarian glaciation
10^{22}		2.4×10^{22} J	Estimated energy contained in the world's coal reserves as of 2010
10^{22}		2.9×10^{22} J	Identified global uranium-238 resources using fast reactor technology
10^{22}		3.9×10^{22} J	Estimated energy contained in the world's fossil fuel reserves as of 2010
10^{22}		4.0×10^{22} J	Mass-energy equivalent of the International Space Station (ISS), weighing around 450 tons.
10^{22}		>4.184×10^{22} J	Estimated energy (>10^{6} megatons of TNT) of large-scale impact events to trigger regional-global damages (blast and earthquake on regional scale, tsunami cresting to 100 m and flooding 20 km inland, and wildfires that would be set globally)
10^{22}		8.03×10^{22} J	Total energy of the 2004 Indian Ocean earthquake
10^{23}		>10^{23} J	The magnitude of energy of Popigai impact event (~23 × 10^{6} megatons of TNT), with some possibility that it was part of a multiple impact event together with Chesapeake Bay impact event and Toms Canyion and some biospheric consequences
10^{23}		~1.2×10^{23} J (0.4×10^{2}^{3}-3×10^{23} J)	Energetic range of the impact of Shoemaker-Levy 9 (~1.2 × 10^{23} J ≈ 2.9×10^{7} megatons of TNT), the first multiple-impact ever seen by mankind with direct-scientific observation, despite having happened on Jupiter, and the first collision observed in the Solar System too
10^{23}		1.5×10^{23} J	Total energy of the 1960 Valdivia earthquake
10^{23}		2.2×10^{23} J	Total global uranium-238 resources using fast reactor technology
10^{23}		~1-7.7×10^{23} J	Proposed energy range for the formation of the Chicxulub Crater in the Yucatán Peninsula by the Chicxulub impactor, (from ~23 to hundreds of teratons of TNT) cited by literature when typically referred to in the order of 10^{23} joules; Chicxulub is extremely important to be the only impact event linked to a mass extinction, the K-Pg extinction, with a near absolute certainty.
10^{23}		8.6×10^{23} J	Estimated energy of Sudbury impact (≈2.1 × 10^{8} megatons of TNT)

== Over 10^{24} J ==
List of orders of magnitude for energy
Factor (joules)	SI prefix	Value	Item
10^{24}	yotta- (YJ)	~1.6×10^{24} J	Estimated energy of Morokweng impact (~4 × 10^{7} megatons of TNT) assuming ~130 km in diameter, possibly linked to the Thitonian or minor extinctions
10^{24}	yotta- (YJ)	~7.3×10^{23}-1.60×10^{24} J	Estimated energy of the Vredefort impact based on factors of ~1.7 and 3.7 relative to previous estimates
10^{24}	yotta- (YJ)	2.31×10^{24} J	Another estimated energy of Sudbury impact event (550 teratons of TNT)
10^{24}	yotta- (YJ)	2.69×10^{24} J	Rotational energy of Venus, which has a sidereal period of (-)243 Earth days. The anomalously low value derives its origin from the deceleration of its rotation by atmospheric tides induced by the Sun.
10^{24}	yotta- (YJ)	0.7-3.4×10^{24} J	Another range of energy of the Chicxulub impact event if 10^{24} Joules are assumed
10^{24}	yotta- (YJ)	~2-4×10^{24} J	Range of energy of Vredefort impact
10^{24}	yotta- (YJ)	3.8×10^{24} J	Radiative heat energy released from the Earth's surface each year
10^{24}	yotta- (YJ)	4×10^{24} J	Estimated energy of Paraburdoo impact (late Archean) with distal spherule layer of 2 cm, 5-10 times more energetic of Chicxulub impact if an energy for it of 6×10^{23} J is assumed
10^{24}	yotta- (YJ)	~4.184×10^{24} J	Estimated energy (~10^{9} megatons of TNT) of a large-scale impact events to trigger a global acidification of the ocean surface waters by sulfur from the interiors of comets and asteroids
10^{24}	yotta- (YJ)	≤5 × 10^{24} J	Estimated energy of the Chicxulub impact if an asteroid of 12 km in diameter, taking into account the crater size, the meteoritic content of the K-Pg boundary clay, and different impact models, is assumed
10^{24}	yotta- (YJ)	5.5×10^{24} J	Total energy from the Sun that strikes the face of the Earth each year
10^{24}	yotta- (YJ)	1-9×10^{24} J	The order of magnitude of the estimated energy of Sudbury, Vredefort and late Archean impacts, and of the formation of Iridum basin
10^{25}		3×10^{25} J	Estimated energy of Barberton S3 impact with distal layer thick of ~25 cm; ~50 times more energetic of Chicxulub impact if an energy for it of 6×10^{23} J is assumed
10^{25}		4×10^{25} J	Total energy of the Carrington Event in 1859
10^{25}		5.8×10^{25} J	Upper limit of the energy of the Chicxulub impact, assuming dozens of kilometers in diameter for the impactor according to different models, and magnitude of the other giant astronomic impacts on Earth
10^{25}		2-9×10^{25} J	Range of estimated energy of the impact that formed Mare Orientale on the Moon
10^{26}		>10^{26} J	Estimated energy of early Archean asteroid impacts and Imbrium basin formation; in general, the minimum energetic order of magnitude for the largest impact basins of the Moon (traditionally associated to the Late Heavy Bombardment), Mars and of the Solar System too
10^{26}		>10^{26} J	Lower limit of the energy of short bursts released by magnetars, calculated according to peak luminosity
10^{26}		~3×10^{26} J	Estimated energy of Barberton S5 impact with 10–100 cm of distal layer thick, comparable to the great lunar basin impacts; ~500 times more energetic of Chicxulub impact if an energy for it of 6×10^{23} J is assumed
10^{26}		3.2×10^{26} J	Bolometric energy of Proxima Centauri's superflare in March 2016 (10^33.5 erg). In one year, potentially five similar superflares erupts from the surface of the red dwarf.
10^{26}		3.828×10^{26} J	Total radiative energy output of the Sun per second, as defined by the IAU.
10^{26}		≥4×10^{26} J	Estimated energy for the formation of South-Pole Aitken basin
10^{26}		5.33×10^{26} J	Estimated energy of the Hellas Planitia impact
10^{27}	ronna- (RJ)	1×10^{27} J	Estimated energy released by the impact that created the Caloris basin on Mercury. (238 petatons of TNT)
10^{27}	ronna- (RJ)	1×10^{27} J	Upper limit of the most energetic solar flares possible (x 1000)
10^{27}	ronna- (RJ)	4×10^{27} J	Estimated energy of the astronomic impact that formed the Utopia Basin, the largest impact crater in the Solar System
10^{27}	ronna- (RJ)	4.2×10^{27} J	Kinetic energy of a regulation baseball thrown at the speed of the Oh-My-God particle, itself a cosmic ray proton with the kinetic energy of a baseball thrown at 60 mph (~50 J). (1 exaton of TNT)
10^{27}	ronna- (RJ)	5.19×10^{27} J	Thermal input necessary to evaporate all surface water on Earth. Note that the evaporated water still remains on Earth in vapor form.
10^{28}		>10^{28} J	The probable order of magnitude of the energy impact that formed the Utopia Basin
10^{28}		3.845×10^{28} J	Kinetic energy of the Moon in its orbit around the Earth (counting only its velocity relative to the Earth)
10^{28}		7×10^{28} J	Total energy of the stellar superflare from V1355 Orionis
10^{29}		2.1×10^{29} J	Rotational energy of the Earth
10^{29}		3-6×10^{29} J	Range of estimated energy in the formation of Borealis Basin on Mars if an impact origin, that could have formed Phobos and Deimos due to the ejected material in the orbit, is assumed
10^{30}	quetta-(QJ)	~10^{30} J	Lower limit of the energy range of fast radio bursts (FRBs)
10^{30}	quetta-(QJ)	1.79×10^{30} J	Rough estimated of the gravitational binding energy of Mercury.
10^{30}	quetta-(QJ)	1.79-5.37×10^{30} J	Range of gravitational accretion energy released by the Late Veneer by the accretion of 0.5-1.5% of the mass of Earth
10^{31}		2×10^{31} J	The Theia Impact, the most energetic event ever in Earth's history
10^{31}		3.3×10^{31}J	Total energy output of the Sun each day
10^{32}		~1×10^{32} J	Estimated energy of a micronova, a new type of stellar explosion discovered in 2022
10^{32}		1.71×10^{32} J	Gravitational binding energy of the Earth
10^{32}		3.10×10^{32} J	Yearly energy output of Sirius B, the ultra-dense and Earth-sized white dwarf companion of Sirius, the Dog Star. It has a surface temperature of about 25,200 K.
10^{33}		2.7×10^{33} J	Earth's kinetic energy at perihelion in its orbit around the Sun
10^{34}		~10^{34} J	Average energy in gamma-rays of novae detected by Fermi-LAT
10^{34}		1.2×10^{34} J	Total energy output of the Sun each year
10^{34}		4.13×10^{34} J	Rotational energy of Jupiter, calculated using an updated value for the moment of inertia factor of 0.26393 ± 0.00001.
10^{35}		>10^{35} J	Upper limit of the energy range of fast radio bursts (FRBs)
10^{35}		>10^{35} J	Estimated energy of a mergerburst between a planet and a brown dwarf with an accretion disk as very low energetic type of ILOTs
10^{35}		>10^{35} J	Lower limit of the energy of outbursts (that are more energetic of short bursts) released by magnetars, calculated according to peak luminosity
10^{35}		3.5×10^{35} J	The most energetic stellar superflare to date (V2487 Ophiuchi)
10^{36}		>10^{36} J	Estimated energy of ASASSN-15qi, proposed as a tidal disruption event of a sub-jupiter young planet by a main-sequence (MS) star as part of ILOTs
10^{36}		>10^{36} J	Upper limit of the energy of short bursts released by magnetars, calculated according to peak luminosity
10^{36}		>10^{36} J	Upper limit of the energy of outbursts (that are more energetic of short bursts) released by magnetars, calculated according to peak luminosity
10^{36}		1.7×10^{36} J	Estimated energy of V4332 Sgr, a low-energetic luminous red nova (LRNe)
10^{36}		4.4×10^{36} J	Total energy of proton acceleration of RS Oph nova
10^{37}		10^{37} J	The magnitude energy of a classic nova explosion
10^{37}		>10^{37} J	Lower limit of energy of giant flares (GF) by magnetars, other probable sources of R-process together with supernovae, kilonovae and in general nuclear fusion of the stars for nucleosynthesis
10^{37}		2×10^{37} J	Total energy (Ek) of RS Oph nova
10^{38}		~10^{38} J	Lower limit of magnitude energy of Intermediate Luminosity Optical Transient (ILOTs)
10^{38}		2.2×10^{38} J	Estimated energy of proton acceleration using RS Oph as prototype (4.4×10^{36} J) in the Milky Way in a year
10^{38}		7.53×10^{38} J	Baryonic (ordinary) mass-energy contained in a volume of one cubic light-year, on average.
10^{39}		2–5×10^{39} J	Range of energy of the giant flare (GF) triggered by starquake on SGR 1806-20
10^{39}		~3-5×10^{39} J	Range of estimated isotropic-energy (Eiso) of extremely low-energetic and low-luminous GRB 170817A, detected in a neutron-star mergers (GW170817), confirming that short-GRB are triggered by kilonovae
10^{39}		6.60×10^{39} J	Theoretical total mass–energy of the Moon
10^{40}		≥10^{40} J	Estimated lower limit of energy of Low‑Energy Supernovae (VLE SNe)
10^{40}		>10^{40} J	Very-low energy of supernovae and "failed-supernovae"; the required minimum energy for a supernova to occur.
10^{40}		1.61×10^{40} J	Baryonic mass-energy contained in a volume of one cubic parsec, on average.
10^{40}		0.3-3×10^{40} J	Range of estimated energy of five intermediate-luminosity red transients (ILRTs), namely AT 2010dn, AT 2012jc, AT 2013la, AT 2013 lb, and AT 2018aes
10^{40}		~7×10^{40} J	Energy in gamma-rays of GRB 980425, the first associated to a hypernova (SN1998bw) according to collapsar model
10^{41}		>10^{41} J	Lower limit of true-beamed corrected energy in gamma-rays (Eγ) of short gamma-ray bursts (SGRBs) with a narrow distribution of ~1 order of magnitude
10^{41}		>10^{41} J	Lower limit of magnitude energy of low-luminous gamma-ray bursts (LLGRBs)
10^{41}		~2×10^{41} J	Estimated energy of SN 2008ha, an extremely faint supernova
10^{41}		2.28×10^{41} J	Gravitational binding energy of the Sun
10^{41}		4×10^{41} J	Estimated energy of AT2017jfs, a very energetic luminous red nova (LRNe)
10^{41}		5.37×10^{41} J	Mass–energy equivalent of the Earth
10^{42}		>10^{42} J	Energy of giant flares of Luminous Blue Variables (LBV) and Very Massive Stars (VMS), and Intermediate Luminosity Red Transients too as very energetic events of ILOTs
10^{42}		>10^{42} J	Upper limit of true-beamed corrected energy in gamma-rays (Eγ) of short gamma-ray bursts (SGRBs) with a narrow distribution of ~1 order of magnitude
10^{42}		>10^{42} J	Lower limit of magnitude energy of short gamma-ray bursts (SGRBs) as isotropic energy (Eiso)
10^{42}		<3×10^{42} J	Estimated energy in gamma-rays of GRB 091127, a sub-energetic gamma-ray burst
10^{42}		~7.4-9.7×10^{42} J	Low estimated energy of sub-luminous LL-Type IIP supernovae (0.07 foe or bethe, with 1 foe=10^{44} J) with SN 2020cxd as prototype
10^{43}		≥10^{43} J	Estimated upper limit of energy of Low‑Energy Supernovae (VLE SNe)
10^{43}		>10^{43} J	Upper limit of magnitude energy of Intermediate Luminosity Optical Transient (ILOTs)
10^{43}		>10^{43} J	Upper limit of magnitude energy of low-luminous gamma-ray bursts (LLGRBs)
10^{43}		~1-4×10^{43} J	Range of estimated energy of ultra‑stripped type-Ic supernovae (iPTF 14gqr-SN 2014 ft) and of electron‑capture supernovae (2018zd)
10^{43}		~5×10^{43} J	Estimated energy of SN 2005ek, a proposed ultra‑stripped supernova
10^{43}		5×10^{43} J	Average total-true energy of all gamma rays (Eγ) in a typical (standard-cosmological) gamma-ray burst if collimated
10^{43}		5.8×10^{43} J	Upper limit of estimated energy for SN 2020cxd (LL‑IIP supernova)
10^{43}		>10^{43} J	Total energy in a typical fast blue optical transient (FBOT)
10^{44}		~10^{44} J	Average value of a Tidal Disruption Event (TDE) in optical/UV bands
10^{44}		~10^{44} J	Estimated kinetic energy released by FBOT CSS161010
10^{44}		~1×10^{44} J	Average kinetic/thermal energy released in a typical Ia-type supernova, core-collapse supernova and kilonova (macronova) too, sometimes referred to as a foe or bethe.
10^{44}		>10^{44} J	Upper limit of magnitude energy of short gamma-ray bursts (SGRBs) as isotropic energy (Eiso)
10^{44}		1.23×10^{44} J	Approximate lifetime energy output of the Sun.
10^{44}		1.71×10^{44} J	Mass-energy equivalent of Jupiter, the most massive planet in our Solar System
10^{44}		3×10^{44} J	Average total energy (E_{total}-Eo), both in gamma-rays (Eγ) and as kinetic energy (Ek) of a typical (standard-cosmological) gamma-ray burst if collimated
10^{44}		~(0.9-3.8)×10^{44} J	Range of approximate beaming-corrected estimated energy in gamma-rays (Ey) of the ultraluminous GRB110918A with a jet opening angle of 1.7°–3.4°
10^{44}		5.8 × 10^{44} J	Kinetic energy of the star S2 as it made its closest approach to Sagittarius A*, the galactic center SMBH, at 7,650 km/s on May 2018.
10^{45}		~10^{45} J	Estimated energy released in typical hypernovae and pair-instability supernovae
10^{45}		10^{45} J	Energy released by the energetic supernova, SN 2016aps
10^{45}		1.7-1.9×10^{45}J	Energy released by hypernova ASASSN-15lh
10^{45}		2.3×10^{45} J	Energy released by the energetic supernova PS1-10adi
10^{45}		>10^{45} J	Estimated energy of a magnetorotational hypernova
10^{45}		>10^{45} J	Total energy (E_{total}-Eo) in gamma rays (Eγ)+relativistic kinetic energy (E_{rel} ≈ Eγ + E_{ke}) of hyper-energetic (standard-cosmological) gamma-ray burst if collimated
10^{45}		∼3 × 10^{45} J	Rotational energy (E_{rot}) of a maximally rotating magnetar, a discriminant to detect the nature of the inner engine of GRBs
10^{45}		~2-5×10^{45} J	Range of estimated energy of SN1998bw, the first associated hypernova to a gamma-ray burst (GRB 980425) with success according to collapsar model.
10^{46}		>10^{46} J	Estimated energy in theoretical quark-novae
10^{46}		~10^{46} J	Upper limit of the total energy of a pair-instability supernova
10^{46}		~10^{46} J	Isotropic energy of short GRB 090510
10^{46}		1.5×10^{46} J	Total energy of the most energetic optical non-quasar transient, AT2021lwx
10^{46}		~1.5×10^{46} J	Gravitational binding energy of a neutron star, a discriminant to see if not-standard particles aren't detected if the released energy in neutrinos is lower, or if a massive neutron star forms if it is higher (~6 × 10^{46} J) in a CCSN
10^{46}		2.5×10^{46} J	Estimated upper limit of Extreme Nuclear Transients (ENTs), an extreme version of TDEs discovered in 2025
10^{46}		2-4×10^{46} J	Range of energy of core-collapse supernovae in neutrinos (~99% of the total energy of the astrophysic transient and ~10% of the mass of its neutron star)
10^{46}		~4-5×10^{46} J	Estimated upper limit of kinetic energy of the most energetic GRB of all time, GRB 221009A, according to the traditional top-hat model for jets assuming collimation; the previous records at 10^{45} J appear broken
10^{47}		10^{45-47} J	Average estimated energy of stellar mass rotational black holes by vacuum polarization in an electromagnetic field
10^{47}		10^{47} J	Total energy of a very energetic and relativistic jetted Tidal Disruption Event (TDE)
10^{47}		~10^{47} J	Estimated energy of a very efficient rotating Kerr-Newman black hole with vacuum polarization, proposed to explain the Eiso of poorly collimated GRBs in which the jet break is absent
10^{47}		~1.3×10^{47} J	The isotropic-energy (Eiso) of GRB 080319B, remarkable especially for having been a naked-eye burst for approximately 30 seconds from 7.5 billion (7.5×10^{9}) light-years and for which a double-structured jet was proposed, featuring a brighter, narrower inner section and a larger outer one with implications about the frequency and visibility from Earth of GRBs too.
10^{47}		1.8×10^{47} J	Theoretical total mass–energy of the Sun
10^{47}		(2.1±0.1)×10^{4}^{7} J	The isotropic-energy (Eiso) of the ultraluminous GRB 110918A
10^{47}		5.4×10^{47} J	Mass–energy emitted as gravitational waves during the merger of two black holes, originally about 30 Solar masses each, as observed by LIGO (GW150914); the event coincided with the first detection of gravitational waves
10^{47}		5.81×10^{47} J	Estimated energy of the mega-energetic GRB 090323
10^{47}		8.6×10^{47} J	Mass–energy emitted as gravitational waves during the most energetic black hole merger observed until 2020 (GW170729)
10^{47}		8.8×10^{47} J	GRB 080916C – formerly the most powerful gamma-ray burst (GRB) ever recorded – total/true isotropic energy (Eiso) output estimated at 8.8 × 10^{47} joules (8.8 × 10^{54} erg), or 4.9 times the Sun's mass turned to energy. It is also proposed an energy of 4.82×10^{4}^{7} J (4.82×10^{54} erg)
10^{48}		10^{48} J	Estimated energy of a supermassive Population III star supernova, denominated "General Relativistic Instability Supernova."
10^{48}		~1.2×10^{48} J	Approximate energy released by GW190521, the first intermediate-mass black hole ever detected
10^{48}		1.2–3×10^{48} J	Range of the total/true isotropic energy output (Eiso) of GRB 221009A – the most powerful gamma-ray burst (GRB) ever recorded (1.2–3 × 10^{55} erg)
10^{48}		3×10^{48} J	The most energetic black hole merger, denominated GW231123, detected in 2023
10^{50}		≳10^{50} J	Upper limit of isotropic energy (Eiso) of Population III stars Gamma-Ray Bursts (GRBs).
10^{53}		>10^{53} J	Mechanical energy of very energetic so-called "quasar tsunamis"
10^{53}		6×10^{53} J	Total mechanical energy or enthalpy in the powerful AGN outburst in the RBS 797
10^{53}		7.65×10^{53} J	Mass-energy of Sagittarius A*, Milky Way's central supermassive black hole
10^{54}		3×10^{54} J	Total mechanical energy or enthalpy in the powerful AGN outburst in the Hercules A (3C 348)
10^{55}		>10^{55} J	Total mechanical energy or enthalpy in the powerful AGN outburst in the MS 0735.6+7421, Ophiuchus Supercluster eruption and supermassive black holes mergings
10^{57}		~10^{57} J	Estimated rotational energy of M87 SMBH and total energy of the most luminous quasars over Gyr time-scales
10^{57}		~2×10^{57} J	Estimated thermal energy of the Bullet Cluster of galaxies
10^{57}		7.3×10^{57} J	Mass-energy equivalent of the ultramassive black hole TON 618, an extremely luminous quasar / active galactic nucleus (AGN).
10^{58}		~10^{58} J	Estimated total energy (in shockwaves, turbulence, gases heating up, gravitational force) of galaxy clusters mergings
10^{58}		4×10^{58} J	Visible mass–energy in our galaxy, the Milky Way
10^{59}		1×10^{59} J	Total mass–energy of our galaxy, the Milky Way, including dark matter and dark energy
10^{59}		1.4×10^{59} J	Mass-energy of the Andromeda galaxy (M31), ~0.8 trillion solar masses.
10^{62}		1–2×10^{62} J	Total mass–energy of the Virgo Supercluster including dark matter, the Supercluster which contains the Milky Way
10^{66}		1.207×10^{66} J	Average mass-energy of ordinary matter contained within one cubic gigaparsec in the observable universe.
10^{70}		1.462×10^{70} J	Rough estimated of total mass–energy of ordinary matter (atoms; baryons) present in the observable universe.
10^{71}		3.177×10^{71} J	Rough estimated of total mass-energy within our observable universe, accounting for all forms of matter and energy.

== SI multiples ==
SI multiples of joule (J)
Submultiples			Multiples		
Value	SI symbol	Name	Value	SI symbol	Name
10^{−1} J	dJ	decijoule	10^{1} J	daJ	decajoule
10^{−2} J	cJ	centijoule	10^{2} J	hJ	hectojoule
10^{−3} J	mJ	millijoule	10^{3} J	kJ	kilojoule
10^{−6} J	μJ	microjoule	10^{6} J	MJ	megajoule
10^{−9} J	nJ	nanojoule	10^{9} J	GJ	gigajoule
10^{−12} J	pJ	picojoule	10^{12} J	TJ	terajoule
10^{−15} J	fJ	femtojoule	10^{15} J	PJ	petajoule
10^{−18} J	aJ	attojoule	10^{18} J	EJ	exajoule
10^{−21} J	zJ	zeptojoule	10^{21} J	ZJ	zettajoule
10^{−24} J	yJ	yoctojoule	10^{24} J	YJ	yottajoule
10^{−27} J	rJ	rontojoule	10^{27} J	RJ	ronnajoule
10^{−30} J	qJ	quectojoule	10^{30} J	QJ	quettajoule

The joule is named after James Prescott Joule. As with every SI unit named after a person, its symbol starts with an upper case letter (J), but when written in full, it follows the rules for capitalisation of a common noun; i.e., joule becomes capitalised at the beginning of a sentence and in titles but is otherwise in lower case.

== See also ==
- Conversion of units of energy
- Energy conversion efficiency
- Energy density
- Metric system
- Outline of energy
- Scientific notation
- TNT equivalent
- Orders of magnitude (power)
