= Oded Regev =

Oded Regev may refer to:

- Oded Regev (computer scientist), Israeli-American theoretical computer scientist and mathematician
- Oded Regev (physicist) (born 1946), physicist and astrophysicist
