= Noam Soker =

Israeli astrophysicist

- נועם סוקר
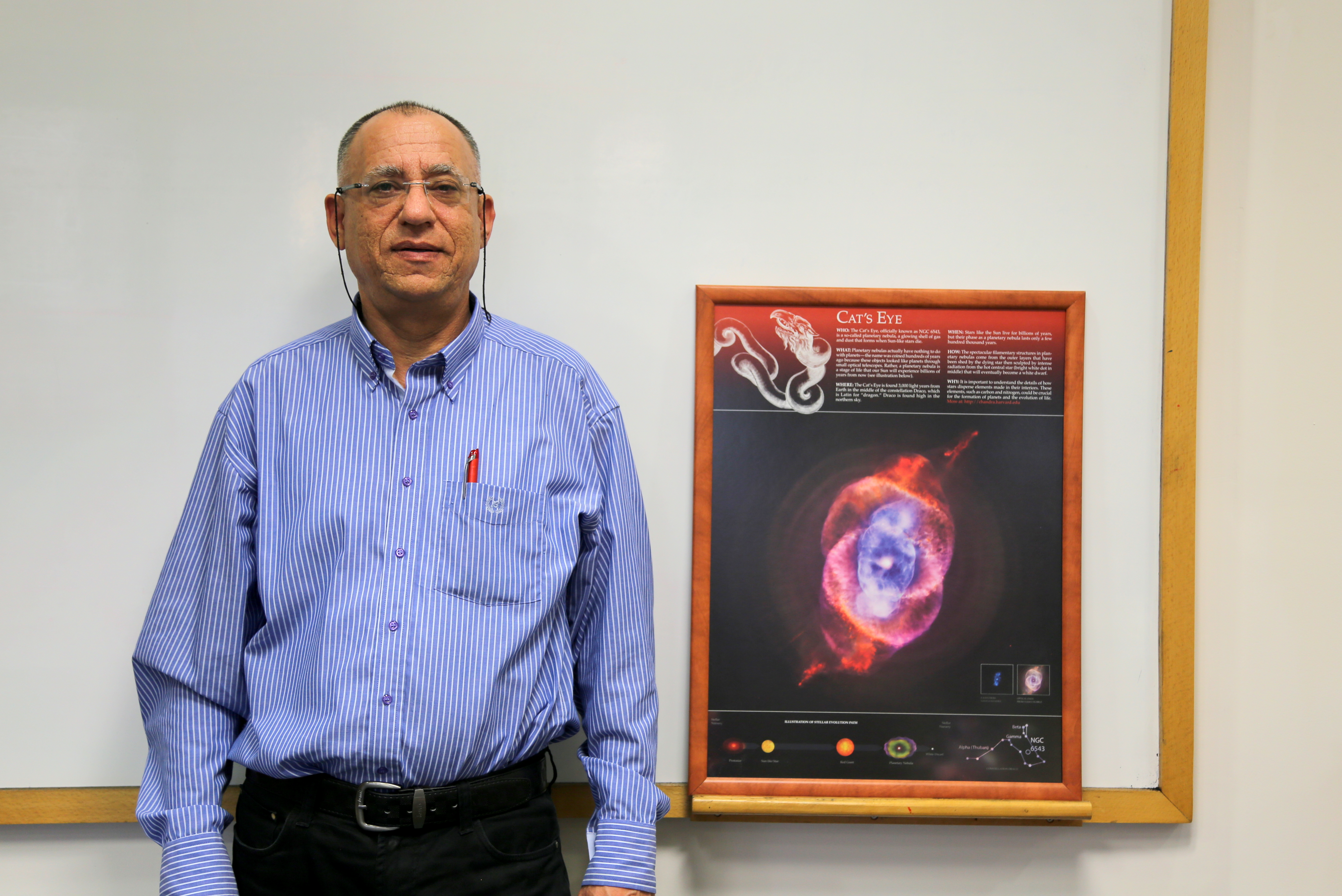
- Born: September 2, 1958 (age 68); Israel
- Education: Technion – Israel Institute of Technology
- Known for: Theory of thermal instability. Theory of Type Ia Supernovae. Models for Planetary Nebulae. Study of Intermediate Luminosity Optical Transients. Theory of Cooling flows in galaxy clusters.
- Awards: Yanai Prize
- Scientific career
- Workplaces: Technion – Israel Institute of Technology
- Doctoral advisor: Mario Livio, Oded Regev

Noam Soker (Hebrew: נועם סוקר) is an Israeli theoretical astrophysicist. He was the chair of the physics department at the Technion – Israel Institute of Technology from 2009 to 2015.

== Biography and career ==
Soker was born in Israel in 1958. He spent his childhood in Kibutz Yas'ur. In 1975 he started his undergraduate studies in the department of mathematics and physics at the University of Haifa at Oranim, and completed them in 1982, in the Technion, after a three years break for service in the Israel Defense Forces.

Under the supervision of Mario Livio and Oded Regev, Soker completed his Ph.D. dissertation, about Bondi–Hoyle–Lyttleton accretion in a non-homogeneous gas.

Soker was a postdoctoral researcher at the University of Virginia from 1986 to 1989, and continued for a second post-doctoral degree at the Center for Astrophysics | Harvard & Smithsonian (1989–1992). During that time he developed models for cooling flows in galaxy clusters, and started to work in the field of planetary nebulae.

In 1992 Soker has received the Alon Fellowship and returned to Israel to become an assistant professor at the Mathematics-Physics Department of the University of Haifa at Oranim. He was promoted to associate professor in 1994, and to full professor in 1998. From 1994 to 1998 he served as the chairman of the Mathematics-Physics Department. In 2003 he moved to the Department of Physics at the Technion, and served as the chair of the physics department for six years (2009–2015). Soker is presently the dean of science in the Guangdong Technion-Israel Institute of Technology. He is also appointed as the head of the Center for Pre-University Studies at the Technion.

== Work ==
Soker studies a variety of astrophysical objects, with a common thread being the conservation of angular momentum. For over 20 years Soker has been studying processes by which planets influence the late evolution of stars, such as the shaping of some planetary nebulae. He is known for his model of planetary nebulae formation as a result of binary star interaction that results in disc accretion and the ejection of jets that shape the nebula into a bipolar form.

In the field of cooling flows in clusters of galaxies, Soker developed a model that accounted for the observational problem that clusters are hotter than anticipated by theory. There was a lack of the large amount of cool gas predicted by models. Soker suggested a "cold feedback" scenario, where nonlinear over-dense blobs of gas cool quickly and are removed from the intracluster medium before the next major active galactic nucleus heating event in their region.

Soker also worked in the field of common envelope evolution in binary stars. He has developed the "core-degenerate" model to account for the explosion of type Ia Supernovae, as a result of the merger of a white dwarf with the core of an Asymptotic Giant Branch star in the late stages of common envelope.

Soker developed a model for the nineteenth century great eruption of the LBV Eta Carinae. The model proposes that when the LBV erupted, its binary companion accreted gas and launched jets that formed the hourglass shaped Homunculus Nebula.

In recent years Soker has studied Intermediate Luminosity Optical Transients (ILOTS), which are stellar eruptions with luminosity between a nova and a supernova. One of the prototypes for such an event is V838 Monocerotis, that according to Soker's model, erupted as a merger of two main-sequence stars that underwent a merger process. Soker and his collaborators claim there is a strong connection between V838 Mon-like eruptions and supernova impostors.
