= List of stellar explosion types =

Stellar explosion can refer to:

- Nova
- Kilonova
- Micronova
- Supernova
  - Type Ia supernova
  - Type Ib and Ic supernovae
  - Type II supernova
  - Superluminous supernova
  - Hypernova
  - Pair-instability supernova
- Supernova impostor, stellar explosions that appear similar to supernova, but do not destroy their progenitor stars
  - Failed supernova
- Luminous red nova, an explosion thought to be caused by stellar collision
- Solar flares are a minor type of stellar explosion
- Tidal disruption event, the pulling apart of a star by tidal forces
