= SN 2022esa =

Type Ic supernova in galaxy LEDA 987574

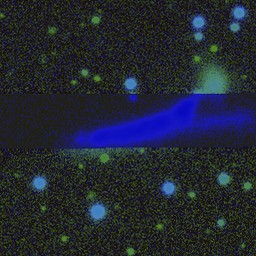
- Image of host galaxy imaged by Legacy Surveys
- Event type: Supernova
- Ic-CSM
- Date: 12 March 2022, 20:08:32
- Instrument: ATLAS
- Constellation: Ursa Major
- Right ascension: 16^{h} 53^{m} 57.60^{s}
- Declination: −09° 42′ 10.3″
- Epoch: J2000
- Distance: 320 Mly (98 Mpc)
- Redshift: 0.02314
- Host: LEDA 987574 (2MFGC 13525)
- Progenitor: Wolf-Rayet star
- Peak apparent magnitude: +18.057
- Other designations: SN 2022esa, ATLAS22iyt, Gaia22bgw, PS22dfl, ZTF22aaemvhi

SN 2022esa (also known as ATLAS22iyt) is a peculiar Type Ic supernova with circumstellar material (Ic-CSM) that was discovered in galaxy LEDA 987574 (2MFGC 13525) located approximately 320 million light-years away in the constellation of Ursa Major. It is notable for its association with the explosion of a massive Wolf–Rayet star in a binary system and is a potential candidate for a binary black hole system. Observations suggest it provides evidence that the collapse of some massive stars can produce supernovae rather than as a failed supernova with direct black hole formation.

== Observation ==
Follow-up observations were conducted using the Seimei telescope in Okayama, Japan, and the Subaru telescope at Mauna Kea, Hawaii. These multi-epoch photometric and spectroscopic data spanned over 400 days.

Spectra revealed late-time emergence of narrow emission lines from oxygen and other intermediate-mass elements formed in the star's core, characteristic of interaction between supernova ejecta and oxygen-rich circumstellar material (CSM). This firmly places it in the rare Type Ic-CSM subclass.

The progenitor is proposed to be a massive Wolf–Rayet (WR) star in a binary system (WR–WR or WR–black hole). In either case, the system is viewed as a potential candidate for a binary black hole system.
