= Anthelme Voituret =

French Carthusian monk and astronomer

- Born: 1618; Châtenay, France
- Died: 1683 (aged 64–65)
- Occupation(s): Astronomer, Carthusian monk
- Known for: discovery of CK Vulpeculae

Anthelme Voituret (1618–1683) was a French Carthusian monk and astronomer.

== Life ==
He was born in Châtenay, France in 1618. and died in 1683.

== Career ==
He was able to devote considerable time in the observation of comets and variable stars.

He discovered several comets and investigated the cause of the brightness change of the variable star Mira. He is credited with being the first to observe the Nova 1670 Vulpeculae, the first ordinary nova discovered in modern times.

== Bibliography ==
In 1681, he published the book Explication de la comete.
