= M31-2014-DS1 =

Failed supernova (candidate) in the Andromeda Galaxy

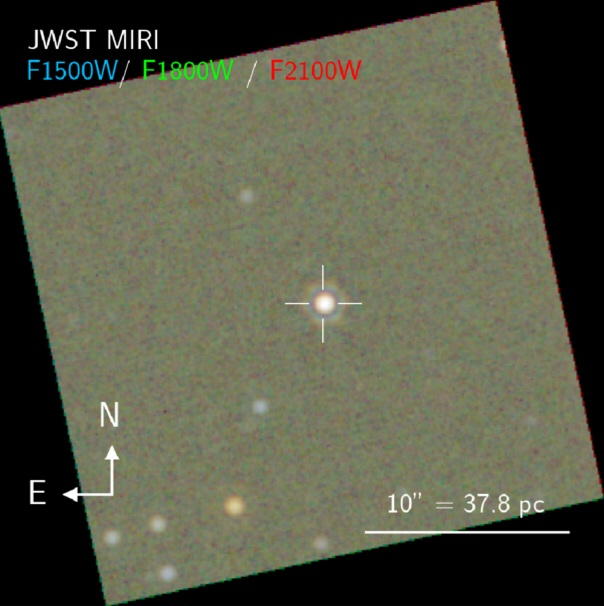
- M31-2014-DS1 imaged by JWST's MIRI Instrument; Credit: Kishalay De et al. (2026)

Observation data Epoch J2000.0 Equinox ICRS
- Constellation: Andromeda
- Right ascension: 00^{h} 45^{m} 13.47509^{s}
- Declination: +41° 32′ 33.1467″
- Apparent magnitude (V): ~22 (pre-2014)

Characteristics
- Evolutionary stage: Yellow supergiant (progenitor)
- Variable type: Failed supernova (candidate)

Astrometry
Proper motion (μ)	RA: −0.171 mas/yr Dec.: −0.106 mas/yr
Parallax (π)	0.0948±0.2315 mas
Distance	2.5M ly (770k pc)

Details

Progenitor
Luminosity	93,325 L_{☉}
Temperature	4,500 K

Other designations
- M31-2014-DS1, M31-DS1

Database references
SIMBAD	data

M31-2014-DS1 is a failed supernova candidate located in the Andromeda Galaxy (M31). It is a massive star observed to have undergone a "silent" collapse directly into a black hole without a characteristic supernova explosion. The event, characterized by a brief infrared brightening followed by the total disappearance of the progenitor star in optical wavelengths, provides observational evidence for the failed supernova theory of stellar evolution.

== Observation history ==
The progenitor star was identified in archival data as a luminous red supergiant with an initial mass estimated at 13 M_{☉}. In 2014, the object underwent a significant mid-infrared outburst, increasing in luminosity as detected by the Spitzer Space Telescope and the Wide-field Infrared Survey Explorer (WISE).

Following this peak, the star began a steady decline in brightness. By 2023, deep imaging from the W. M. Keck Observatory and the Hubble Space Telescope confirmed that the star was no longer visible. Unlike a standard Type II supernova, no luminous optical transient was detected during the collapse.

== Physical mechanism ==
The disappearance of M31-2014-DS1 is attributed to the collapse of the stellar core after the exhaustion of nuclear fuel. In typical stars of this mass range, the collapse triggers a shockwave that expels the outer layers. However, in the case of M31-2014-DS1, the shock failed to overcome the material falling inward.

=== Neutrino emission ===
Theoretical models of the collapse suggest a brief, intense burst of neutrinos occurred at the moment of event horizon formation. The abrupt cessation of the neutrino signal marks the exact point of black hole birth.

=== Dust shell and remnant ===
The infrared signature observed in 2014-2016 is believed to be caused by a small fraction of the stellar envelope (~1 M_{☉}) being ejected at low velocities, subsequently cooling and forming a shroud of dust. The remaining mass collapsed into a stellar-mass black hole.

== Scientific significance ==
The discovery addresses the "missing supernova" problem, where the number of observed supernovae is lower than predicted by the star formation rate. M31-2014-DS1 suggests that a significant fraction of massive stars may end their lives as failed supernovae rather than in bright explosions.

Recent studies have also used this event to calibrate neutrino detectors like Super-Kamiokande, as the energy profile of the neutrinos provides data on the mass of the progenitor and the state of matter during collapse.

== Alternative explanations ==
Several researchers have proposed alternative models to explain the star's infrared behavior and subsequent disappearance in optical wavelengths.

=== Stellar merger ===
Some models suggest the 2014 infrared outburst was not a precursor to the collapse, but rather a luminous red nova event caused by the merger of two stars. In this scenario, the "disappearance" is actually the merged remnant being temporarily shrouded by a thick, expanding shell of ejected material.

=== Extreme obscuration ===
Observations in early 2026 using the James Webb Space Telescope (JWST) have detected a persistent, albeit faint, mid-infrared source at the progenitor's coordinates. This has led some astronomers to argue that the star has not vanished, but has instead entered a phase of extreme mass loss, creating a dust cocoon thick enough to block all visible light.

=== Unsteady mass loss ===
A 2026 preprint suggests the event could be an unusually long-duration eruption of a luminous blue variable star, which can mimic the appearance of a "disappearing" star before eventually re-emerging decades later.

== See also ==
- Gravitational collapse
- N6946-BH1 - another failed supernova candidate
- Stellar evolution
