= CK Vulpeculae =

1678 Nova seen in the constellation Vulpecula

- CK Vulpeculae taken by ALMA. Credit: ALMA (ESO/NAOJ/NRAO)/S. P. S. Eyres

Observation data Epoch J2000.0 Equinox ICRS
- Constellation: Vulpecula
- Right ascension: 19^{h} 47^{m} 38.0^{s}
- Declination: +27° 18′ 48″
- Apparent magnitude (V): max 2.6

Characteristics
- B−V color index: 0.7
- Variable type: unknown

Astrometry
Distance	10000+3000 −2000 ly (3200+900 −600 pc)

Details
Luminosity	0.9 L_{☉}
Temperature	14,000 – 100,000 K

Other designations
- CK Vulpeculae, CK Vul, Nova Vul 1670, HR 7539, 11 Vul

Database references
SIMBAD	data

CK Vulpeculae (also Nova Vulpeculae 1670) is an object whose exact nature is unknown. It was once considered to be the oldest reliably-documented nova. It consists of a compact central object surrounded by a bipolar nebula.

Models suggest CK Vulpeculae may not be a classic nova; rather it may be classified as a luminous red nova which is the result of two main sequence stars colliding and merging. A 2018 study found it was most likely the result of an unusual collision of a white dwarf and a brown dwarf. A 2020 article ruled out this proposed mechanism and proposes that CK Vulpeculae is an intermediate luminosity optical transient, i.e. an object in the luminosity gap between supernovae and novae.

== Eruptive history ==
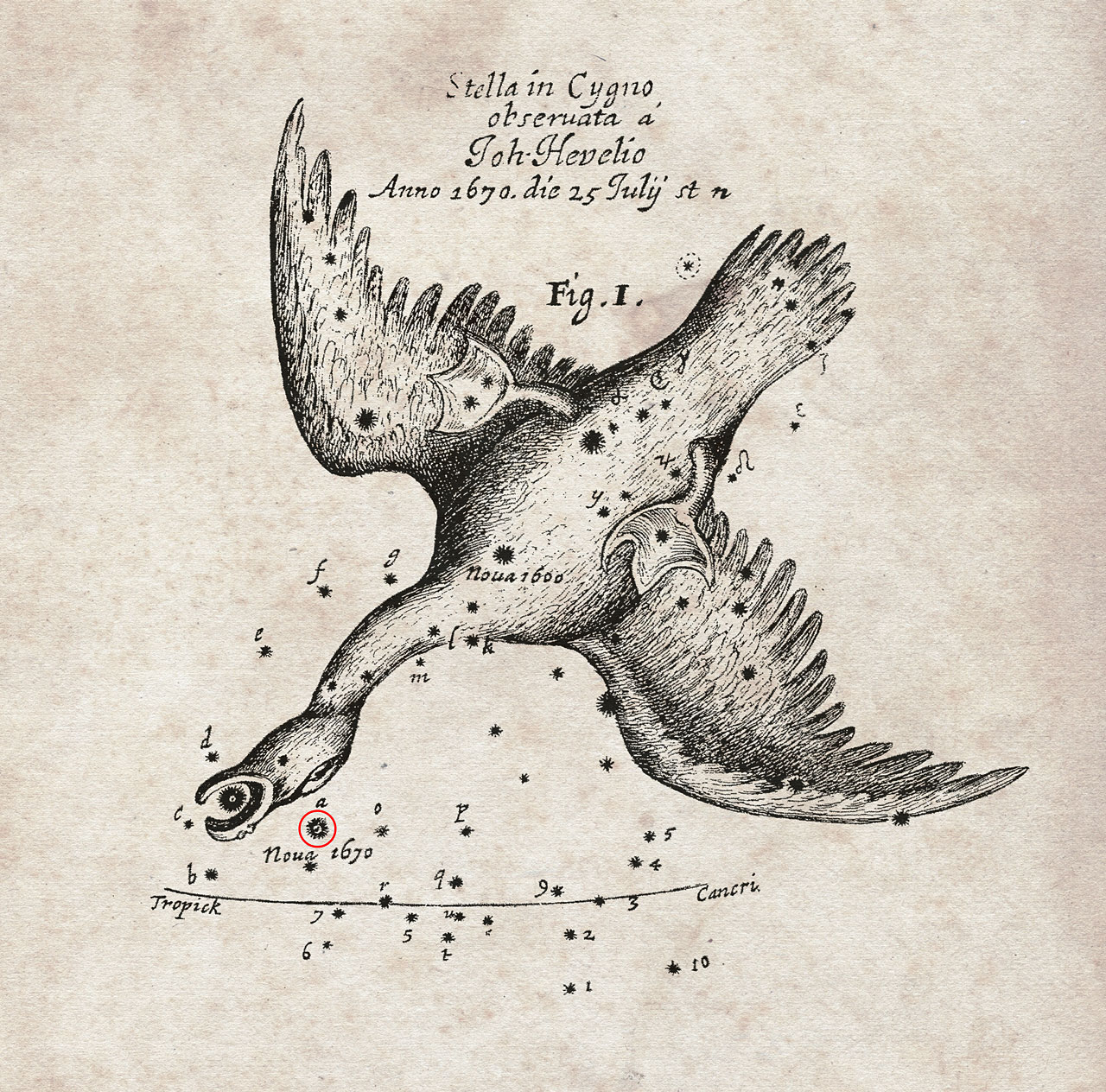
Position of the 1670 Nova near Albireo

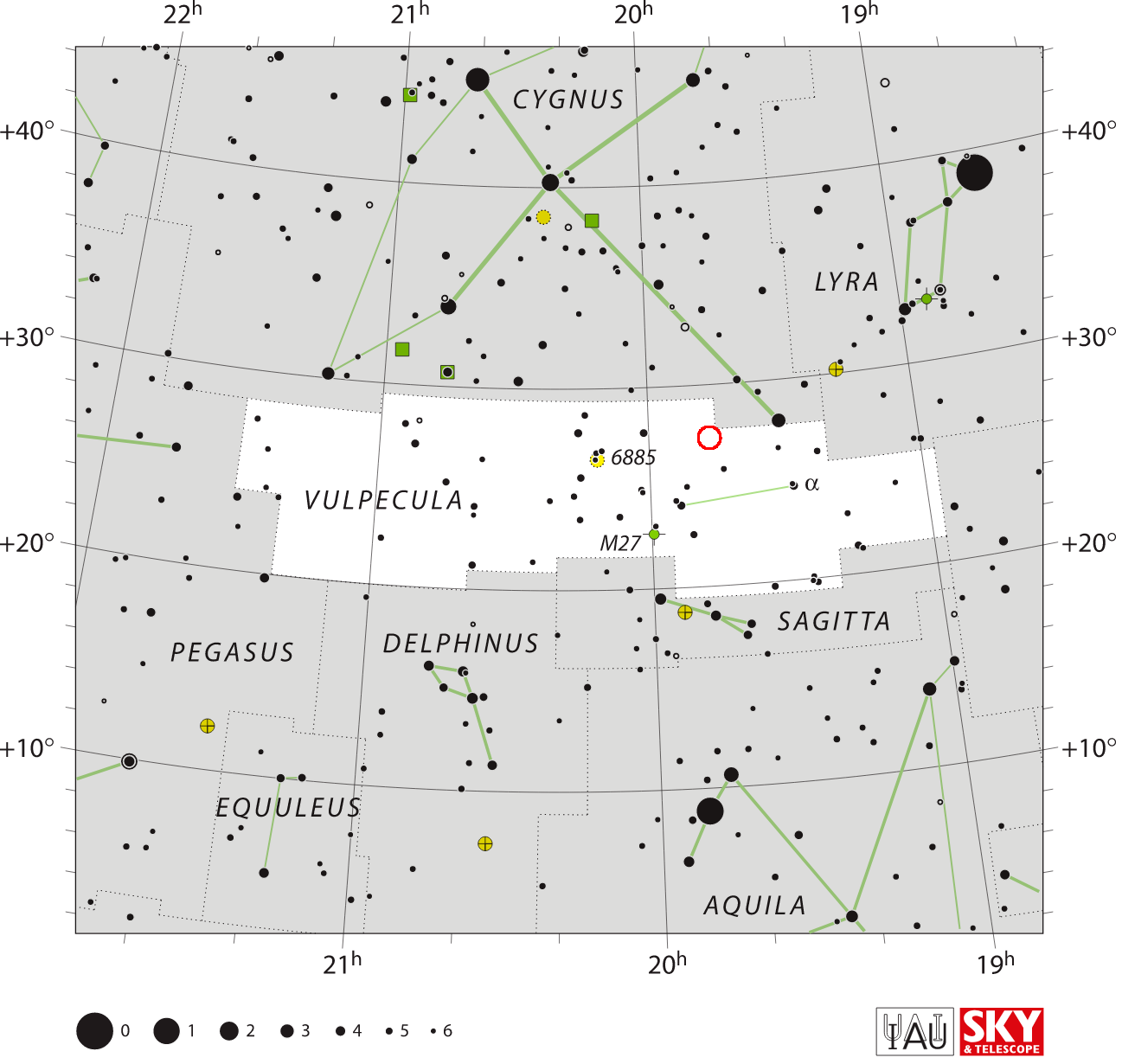
The location of CK Vulpeculae (circled in red)

CK Vulpeculae was discovered on June 20, 1670, by Voituret Anthelme and independently on July 25 by Johannes Hevelius. It had a brightness maximum of approximately magnitude 3 at its discovery after which it faded. A second maximum of approximately 2.6 magnitude was observed in March 1671, after which Johannes Hevelius and Giovanni Cassini observed it throughout spring and summer until it faded from naked-eye view in late August 1671. A last weakly visible brightness maximum of approximately 5.5 to 6 magnitude was observed by Hevelius in March 1672 and finally faded from view late May.

This was the first nova for which there are multiple and reliable observations. The next nova to be documented as comprehensively was Nova Ophiuchi 1841.

An historical study published in 2025 suggests it's possible that the CK Vul system may have had a previous classical nova eruption in 1408, that was recorded by Chinese astronomers.

== Identification ==
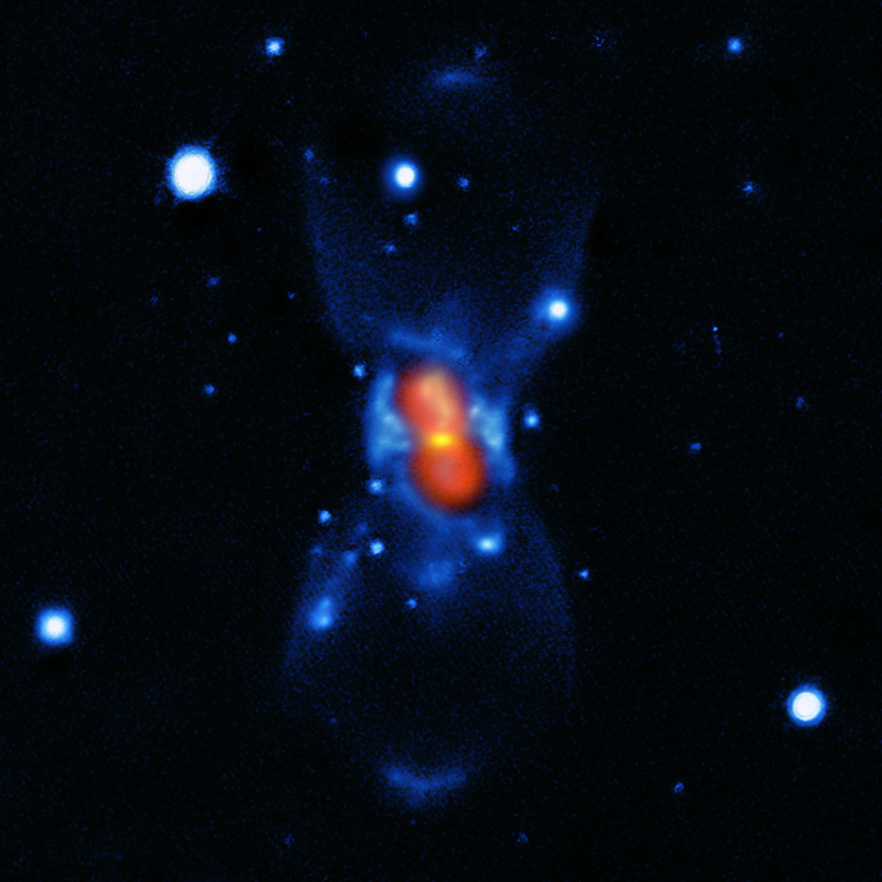
Visible light is in blue, submillimeter radiation map highlighted in green, and molecular emission in red.

John Flamsteed, who was elaborating his catalogue during these years, assigned the star the Flamsteed designation 11 Vulpeculae, which has been noted later by Francis Baily as one of Flamsteed's lost stars, because it had not been detectable for centuries.

In 1981, a point source near the centre of a small nebula was identified as CK Vulpeculae, with an estimated red magnitude of 20.7. Later observations cast doubt on that identification, and it is now known to be a background object. That object and another star are thought to be seen though dense nebulosity associated with CK Vulpeculae which causes them to vary dramatically in brightness.

CK Vulpeculae now consists of a compact central object with gas flowing out at approximately 210 km/s into a bipolar nebula. A 15" path of nebulosity seen in the 1980s lies at the centre of a 70" bipolar nebula. A compact radio source is seen at the centre of this nebula, and an infrared point source, but it has not been detected at optical wavelengths. The ionisation of the nebula and its radio emission indicate that the central source is still very hot and relatively luminous. It is either inside of a cloud of cold (~ 15 K) dust or the cloud is in front of it from the Earth's perspective. Molecular gas in the vicinity is rich in nitrogen relative to oxygen.

== Properties ==
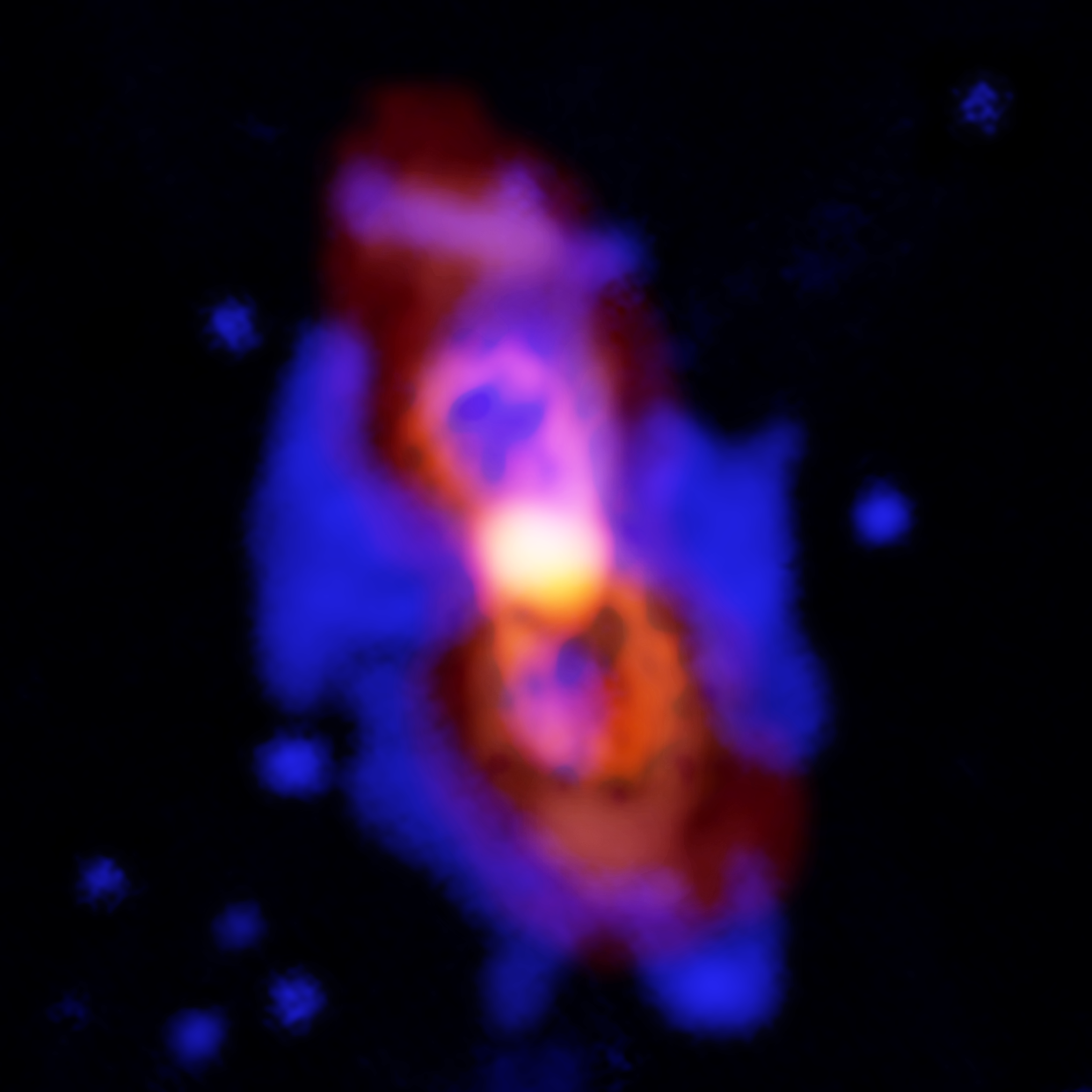
Radioactive molecules in the remains of a stellar collision.

The luminosity of the central object, estimated from infrared dust emission, is about 0.9 L_{☉}. The luminosity required to energise the observed nebulosity is calculated at 3 L_{☉} from an object at 60,000 K At the time of its eruption, the luminosity of CK Vulpeculae is calculated to have been at least 7,000,000 L_{☉}. Known ionic emission lines in the spectrum, and unidentified absorption features in the infrared indicate a temperature between 14,000 K and 100,000 K.

Astronomers using the Atacama Large Millimetre Array (ALMA) and the Northern Extended Millimeter Array (NOEMA) radio telescopes to study CK Vulpeculae have found the first convincing evidence of a radioactive molecule outside the Earth's Solar System, which is aluminium monofluoride as the ^{26}Al isotopologue.

== Nature of the eruption ==
In the past, a luminous red nova merger, very late thermal pulse, or a diffusion-induced nova have all been suggested but there are problems with all these explanations. An analysis of the structures and isotopic abundances in the remaining nebula using the Atacama Large Millimeter Array (ALMA) in 2018 concluded that the nova and associated nebula were caused by the unusual merger of a white dwarf and brown dwarf between 1670 and 1672. Although it was previously considered to be located about 2,280 ly (700 pc) away, a 2020 paper ruled this out due to a larger distance for CK Vulpeculae making the intrinsic energy release too great for a stellar merger. Instead the 2020 paper concludes that the CK Vulpeculae outburst was an intermediate luminosity optical transient with an unknown cause.
