= Fast blue optical transient =

Astronomical observation

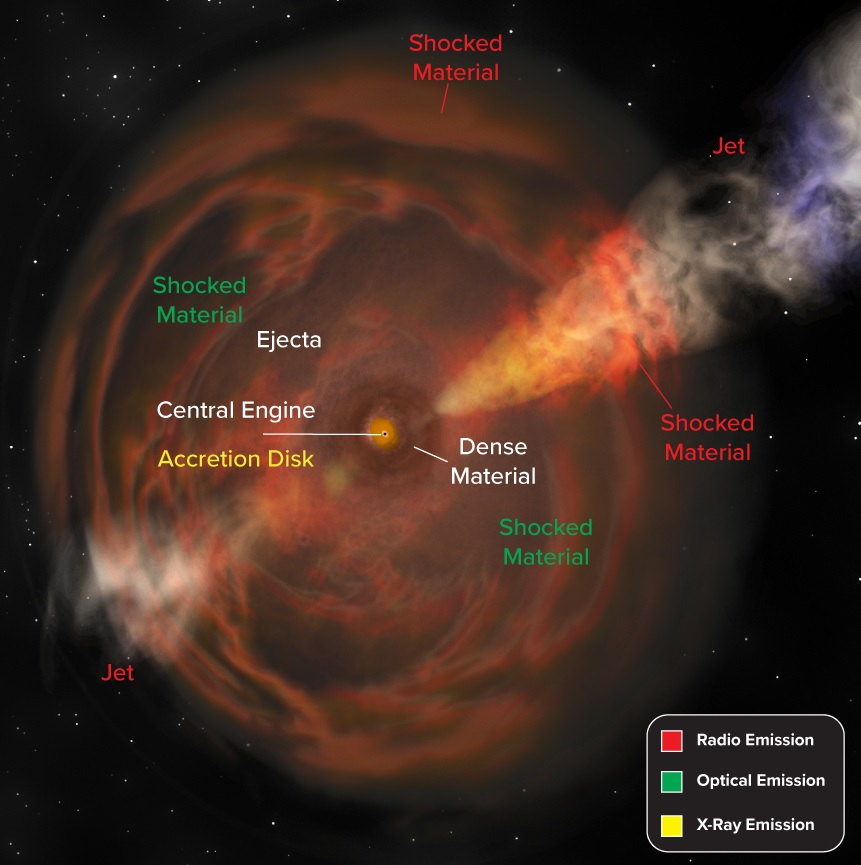
Illustration of a FBOT

In astronomy, a fast blue optical transient (FBOT), or more specifically, luminous fast blue optical transient (LFBOT), is an explosive transient event similar to supernovae and gamma-ray bursts with high optical luminosity, rapid evolution, and predominantly blue emission. The origins of such explosions are currently unclear, with events occurring at not more than 0.1% of the typical core-collapse supernova rate. This class of transients initially emerged from large sky surveys at cosmological distances, yet in recent years a small number have been discovered in the local Universe, most notably SN 2018cow.

The precise definition of what constitutes a 'fast blue optical transient' is currently contentious in the literature, largely defined by the observational properties rather than the underlying mechanisms/objects. Even within the class, growing samples of candidates are beginning to reveal significant variation in properties when the objects are studied in greater detail, potentially indicative of different progenitor channels or explosion mechanisms.

== List ==
Transient	Reported	Date	Observatory	Notes
SN 2018cow	2018	16 June 2018	ATLAS-HKO	"The Cow", the most local FBOT known, and the event with the richest dataset, making it a prototype of the class. Peak luminosity $L_{pk}\sim 10^{44}$erg s⁻¹, exceeding that of superluminous supernovae
ZTF18abvkwla (AT 2018lug)	2020	12 September 2018	Zwicky Transient Facility	"The Koala" Blackbody temperature of over 40,000 Kelvin at peak
CSS161010	2020	10 October 2016	CRTS	Shows mildly relativistic (55% the speed of light) mass outflows
AT 2020xnd (ZTF20acigmel)	2021	12 October 2020	Zwicky Transient Facility	"The Camel"
AT 2020mrf	2022	12 June 2020	Spektr-RG, Zwicky Transient Facility	200 times more luminous on the X-ray spectrum at its peak than SN 2018cow and CSS161010
AT 2022tsd	2023	7 September 2022	Neil Gehrels Swift Observatory, Zwicky Transient Facility	"The Tasmanian Devil", minutes-duration optical flares suggestive of a NS/BH from a failed supernova event.
AT 2023fhn	2023	10 April 2023	Zwicky Transient Facility	"The Finch" or "The Fawn"
AT 2023vth (ZTF23ableqsp)	2023	18 October 2023	Zwicky Transient Facility	First FBOT to be labelled as such on the Transient Name Server.
AT 2024wpp	2024	26 September 2024	Zwicky Transient Facility	"The wasp" (tentatively), brightest FBOT at time of discovery with peak at −21.9 mag
AT 2025wap (ZTF25abkgjzb)	2025	21 August 2025	Zwicky Transient Facility	

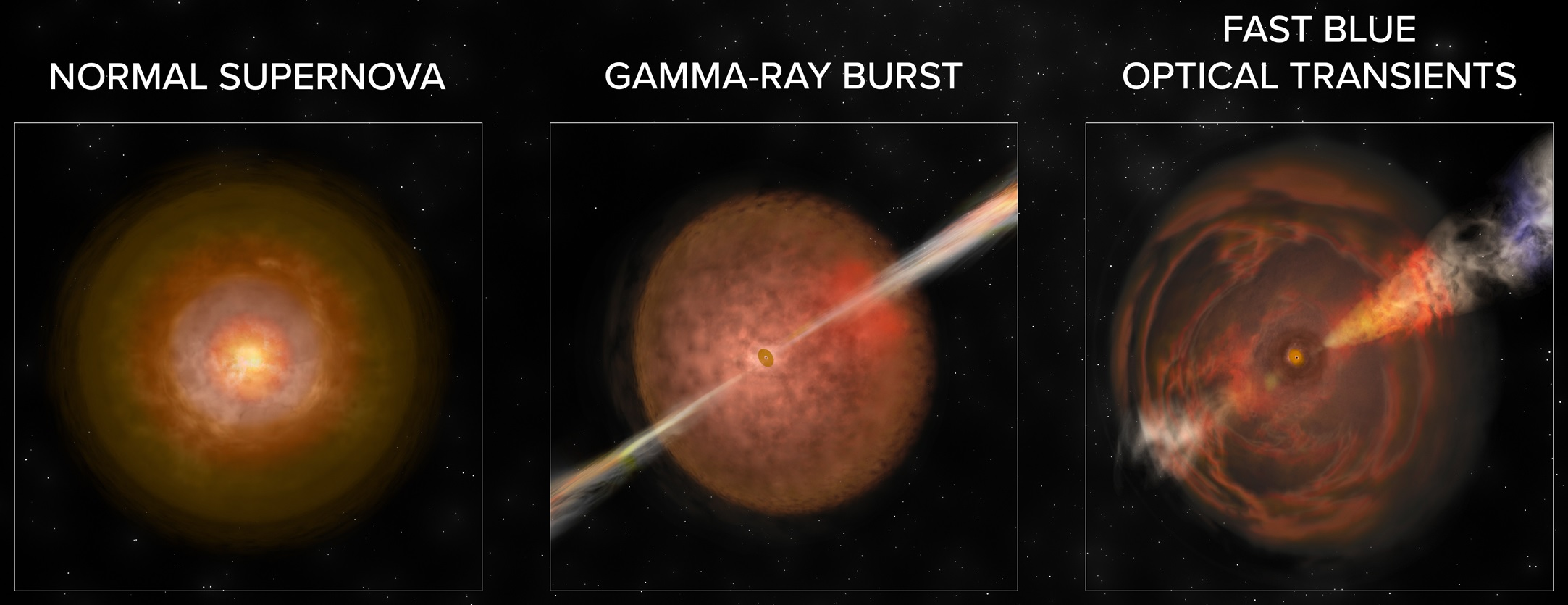
Comparison of explosion scenarios of supernovae (SN), gamma-ray bursts (GRB) and fast blue optical transients (FBOT)

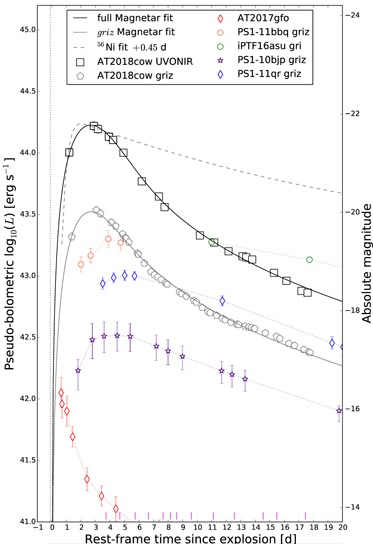
Bolometric luminosity of SN 2018cow, compared against other fast transients, showing a very rapid evolution and high peak luminosity

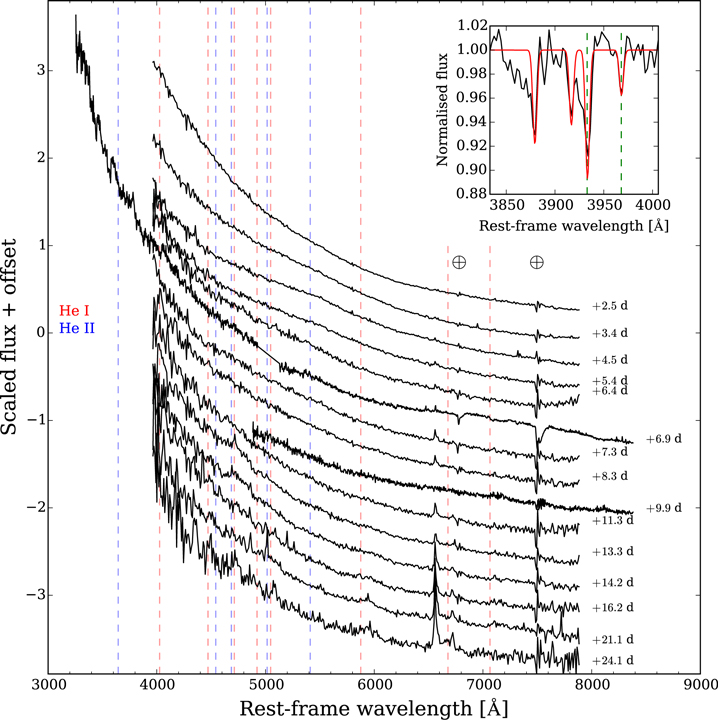
Optical spectra of SN 2018cow, revealing a hot blackbody emission, with significant flux bluewards of (4000 Å)

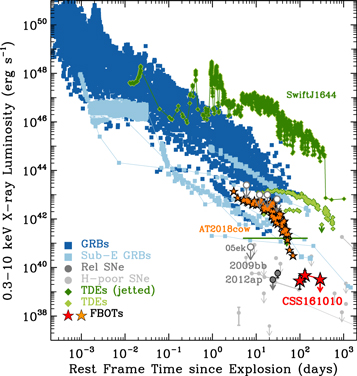
X-ray luminosity of FBOTs compared with other astronomical transients

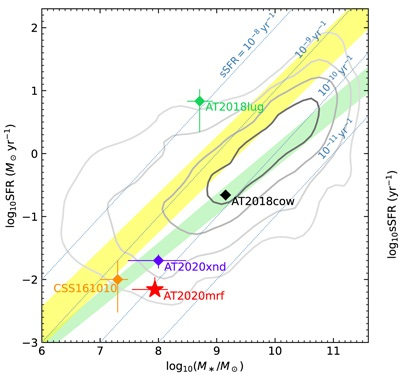
Star formation rate diagram for FBOTs.

Multi-wavelength composite (X-ray, ultraviolet, optical, and near-infrared) of AT 2024wpp, the most luminous LFBOT observed to date, at the edge of its host galaxy 1.1 billion light-years from Earth.

== See also ==
- Gamma-ray burst
- Intermediate luminosity optical transient
- Supernova
