= N6946-BH1 =

Disappearing red supergiant star in the galaxy NGC 6946

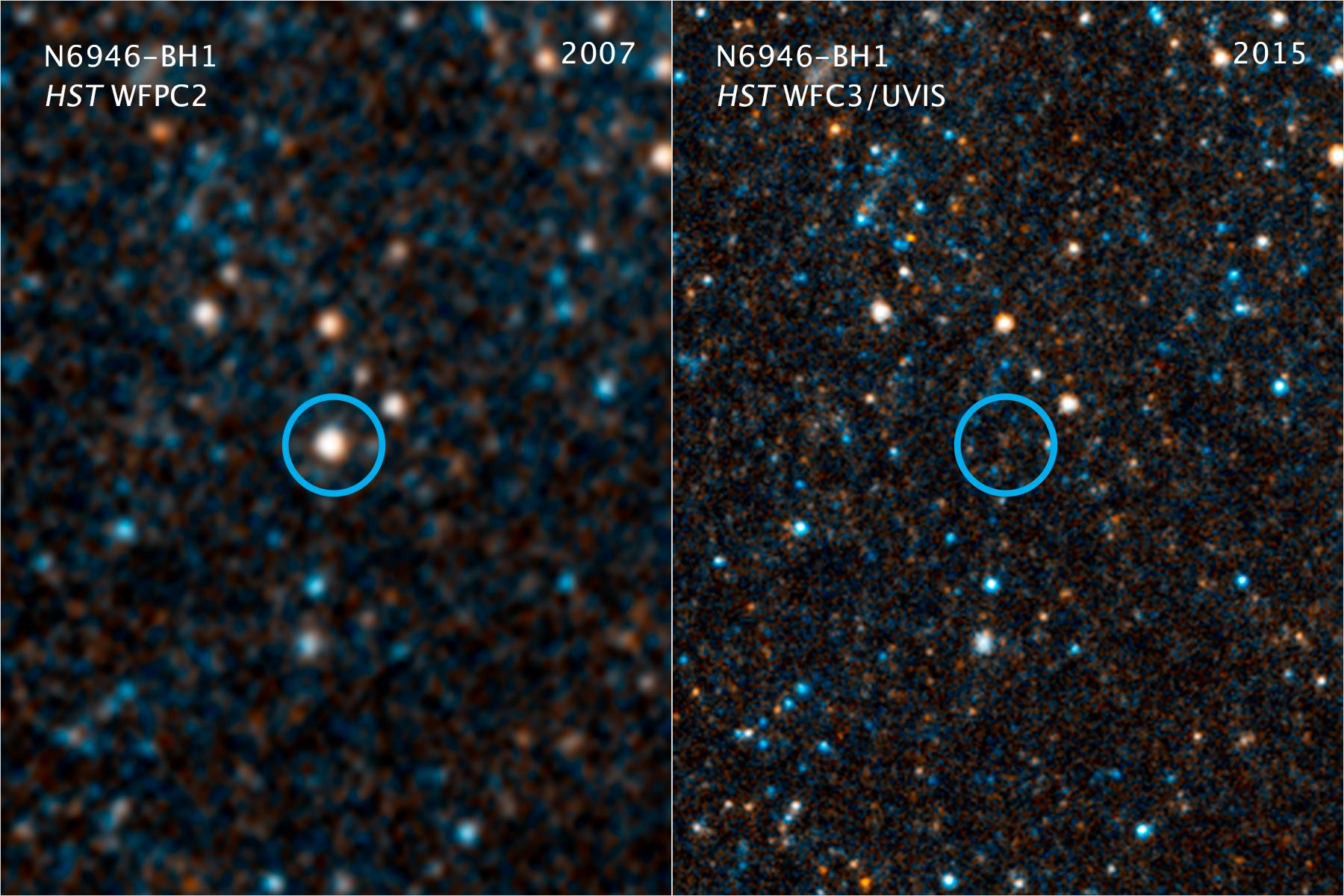
- Pair of visible-light and near-infrared photos from NASA's Hubble Space Telescope showing N6946-BH1 before and after it vanished from sight

Observation data Epoch J2000.0 Equinox ICRS
- Constellation: Cygnus
- Right ascension: 20^{h} 35^{m} 27.56^{s}
- Declination: +60° 08′ 08.3″
- Apparent magnitude (V): 18.17 (max)

Characteristics
- Variable type: suspected failed supernova

Astrometry
Distance	5,960,000 pc

Details
Mass	25 M_{☉}
Radius	1,765 (Note: Applying the Stefan-Boltzmann Law with a nominal solar effective temperature of 5,772 K: $$\sqrt{(5772/3515)^4 * 10^{5.632}} = 1,765\ R\odot$$) R_{☉}
Luminosity	429,000+32,000 −26,000 L_{☉}
Temperature	3,515+29 −45 K

Database references
SIMBAD	data

N6946-BH1 is a disappearing supergiant star and failed supernova candidate formerly seen in the galaxy NGC 6946, on the northern border of the constellation of Cygnus. The star, either a red supergiant or a yellow hypergiant, was 25 times the mass of the Sun, and was 20 million light years distant from Earth. In March through to May 2009 its bolometric luminosity increased to at least a million solar luminosities, but by 2015 it had disappeared from optical view. In the mid and near infrared an object is still visible; however, it is fading away with a brightness proportional to t^{−4/3}(where t is the time since the collapse). This means for each doubling of elapsed time, it becomes about 2.5 times dimmer. The brightening was insufficient to be a supernova; the process that created the outburst is still uncertain.

== Description ==
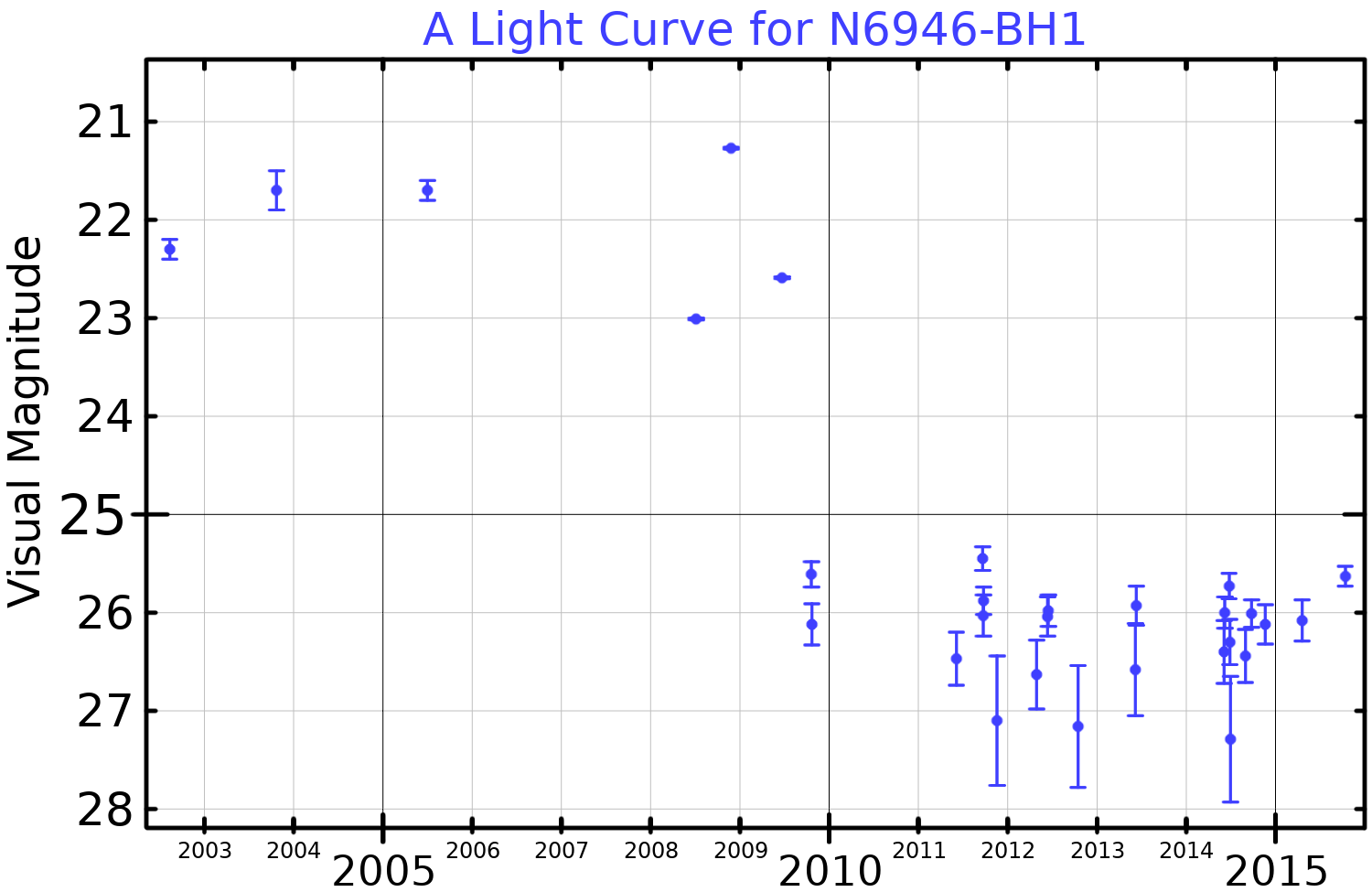
A visual band light curve for N6946-BH1, plotted from data published by Adams et al. (2017)

The star's coordinates were at RA 20^{h} 35^{m} 27.56^{s} and Dec +60° 08′ 08.3″. The brightness of the star, given by its apparent magnitude in different colour bands on 2 July 2005 is given by R = 21, V = 22, B = 23, U = 24. Prior to the optical outburst the star was about 430,000 times as bright as the Sun. After the outburst it was invisible in the visual band and has declined to 5,000 times as bright as the Sun in infrared radiation.

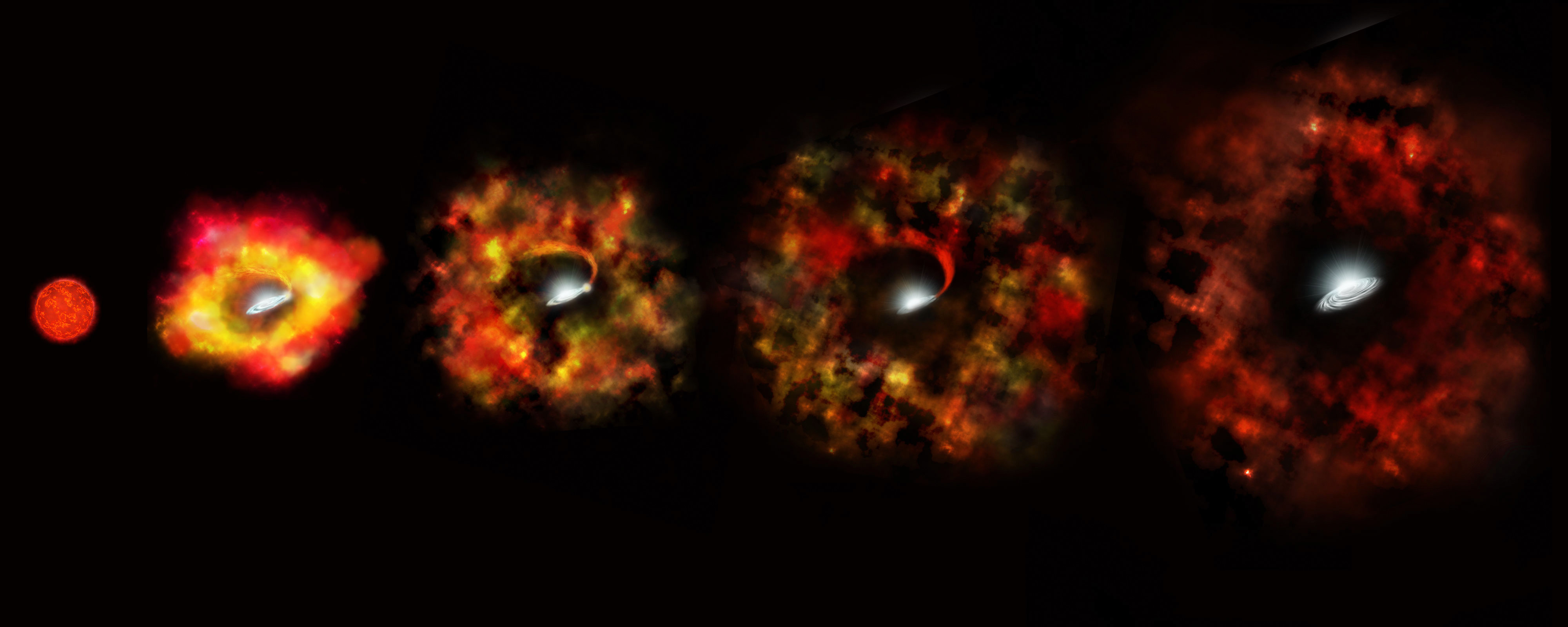
N6946-BH1 failed supernova (artist's impression)

One hypothesis is that of the failed supernova. In this scenario, the core of the star collapsed to form a black hole. The collapsing matter formed a burst of neutrinos that lowered the total mass of the star by a fraction of a percent. This caused a shock wave that blasted out the star's envelope to make it brighter. N6946-BH1 has supplied evidence contrary to the conventional idea that black holes are usually formed after a supernova, suggesting instead that a star may bypass this eventuality and yet collapse into a black hole.

Observed type II supernovae do not originate from stars with initial masses greater than about 18 M_{☉}, and the rate of large star formation appears to exceed the rate of supernovae. The expectation is that something else is happening to these extra large stars. Failed supernovae and black hole formation is one proposed explanation. If this event indeed reflected the formation of a black hole, it is the first time that black hole formation has been observed.

Observations from the James Webb Space Telescope show that all observations before it were a combination of at least three objects. The data the instrument collected matches that of a merger of two stars; however, the failed supernova hypothesis cannot be ruled out.

== See also ==
- M31-2014-DS1
