= Micronova =

Explosive stellar phenomenon about one millionth the strength of a classical nova

Artist's impression of a micronova

A micronova is a putative type of thermonuclear explosion on the surface of a white dwarf much smaller than the strength of a nova; being about 1×10^{39} ergs (1.0×10^{−12} foe; 1.0×10^{32} J) in strength, about a millionth that of a typical nova. The phenomenon was first described in April 2022.

== History ==
A team led by Dr Simone Scaringi of Durham University announced on 20 April 2022 that they identified three micronovae using data from the Transiting Exoplanet Survey Satellite (TESS). The team discovered with TESS that two of the micronovae occurred on white dwarfs, with the astronomers confirming with the Very Large Telescope that the third occurred on a white dwarf as well.

The phenomenon had previously been observed in the white dwarf binary TV Columbae using data from the International Ultraviolet Explorer. However the data was not sufficient to infer the physical mechanism behind the explosion.

== Formation ==
Micronovae specifically form on white dwarfs that have strong magnetic fields, as fields send material toward the star's magnetic poles. This causes the hydrogen fusion explosions on the surface to be more localized and smaller than a typical nova.

An alternative explanation for the phenomenon is that these represent magnetic reconnection events either in the accretion disks or in the coronae of the companion stars. The system V2487 Oph is one of the candidate micronovae, and has also shown standard recurrent novae. The properties of its short duration flares have been suggested to not agree with predictions for nuclear fusion events.

== See also ==
- The dictionary definition of micronova at Wiktionary
