= Intermediate Luminosity Red Transient =

Intermediate Luminosity Red Transients (ILRT), is a subclass of stellar transients that occupy the luminosity gap between classical nova and typical supernovae.

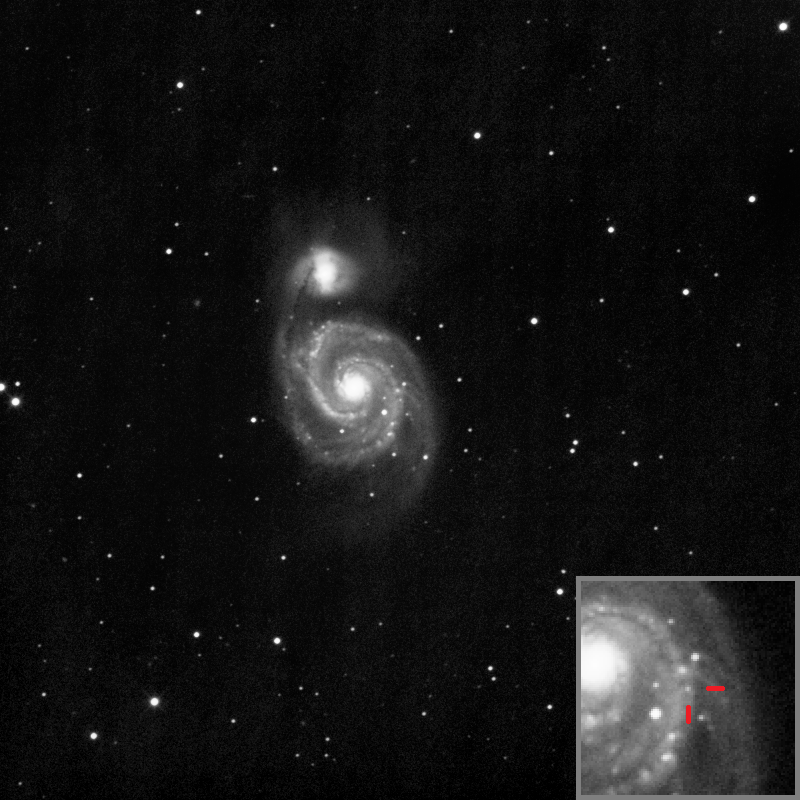
AT 2019abn observed in galaxy M51

ILRTs are part of the broader category of Intermediate Luminosity Optical Transient or gap transients, which include diverse phenomena such as luminous red nova and supernova impostors. However, ILRTs are distinguished by their spectroscopic features and light curve shapes, often resembling faint Type II supernovae.

== Progenitors ==
Progenitors are dust-enshrouded, detected primarily in MIR but faint or undetected in optical pre-explosion images. Estimated masses are 8–12 M⊙, consistent with super-asymptotic giant branch (super-AGB) stars. Late-time observations show some ILRTs fading below progenitor luminosity in MIR, supporting terminal explosions.

The favored explanation is electron capture supernova in a super-AGB stars with degenerate O–Ne–Mg cores. Electron capture on Ne and Mg reduces pressure support, triggering collapse. Alternatives include non-terminal outbursts or mergers, but fading below progenitor levels and low yields favor terminal electron capture supernova.

== Table ==
Transient	Galaxy	Reported	Date	Observatory	Notes and Reference
SN 2008S	NGC 6946		1 February 2008		Prototype
NGC 300-OT	NGC 300		14 May 2008		
M51 OT2019-1	M51		22 January 2019	ATLAS	
