= Toms Canyon impact crater =

Probable impact crater in New Jersey, USA

- Location: New Jersey, United States; 39°08′N 72°51′W

Impact crater structure
- Confidence: probable
- Diameter: 13.7 mi (22 km)
- Age: 35 million years

The Toms Canyon impact crater is a probable impact crater where one or more asteroids struck the Atlantic continental shelf, about 100 miles (160 km) east of Atlantic City, New Jersey. The submarine canyon is the drowned glacial-age mouth of Toms River.

The crater dates to the late Eocene geological time period (about 35 million years ago), and may have been formed by the same event as the larger Chesapeake Bay impact crater (and possibly the Popigai impact structure in Siberia), 200 miles (320 km) to the southwest at the mouth of Chesapeake Bay, also dating to the late Eocene.

Seismic reflection profiles, studied by USGS scientists, show that the crater was formed by an object or objects which struck from the southwest at a glancing angle and formed a long, oval crater. Since impact, sediment filled part of the crater, giving it its present triangular shape.

== See also ==
- List of possible impact structures on Earth

== Bibliography ==
- Poag, C. Wiley. Chesapeake Invader: Discovering America's Giant Meteorite Crater. Princeton, NJ: Princeton University Press, 1999. ISBN 0-691-00919-8
