= Intermediate luminosity optical transient =

Explosive astronomical event

An Intermediate Luminosity Optical Transient (ILOT) is an astronomical object which undergoes an optically detectable explosive event with an absolute magnitude (M) brighter than a classical nova (M ~ −8) but fainter than that of a supernova (M ~ −17). That nine magnitude range corresponds to a factor of nearly 4000 in luminosity, so the ILOT class may include a wide variety of objects. The term ILOT first appeared in a 2009 paper discussing the nova-like event NGC 300 OT2008-1. As the term has gained more widespread use, it has begun to be applied to some objects like KjPn 8 and CK Vulpeculae for which no transient event has been observed, but which may have been dramatically affected by an ILOT event in the past. The number of ILOTs known is expected to increase substantially when the Vera C. Rubin Observatory becomes operational.

A very wide variety of objects have been classified as ILOTs in the astronomical literature. Kashi and Soker proposed a model for the outburst of ASASSN-15qi, in which a Jupiter-mass planet is tidally destroyed and accreted onto a young main sequence star. Luminous red novae, believed be caused by the merger of two stars, are classified as ILOTs. Some luminous blue variables, such as η Car have been classified as ILOTs. Some objects which have been classified as failed supernovae may be ILOTs. The common thread tying all of these objects together is a transfer of a large amount of mass (0.001 M_{☉} to a few M_{☉}) from a planet or star to a companion star, over a short period of time, leading to a massive eruption. That large range in accretion mass explains the large range in ILOT event brightness.

== See also ==
- Intermediate Luminosity Red Transient
- Fast blue optical transient
