= PS1-10adi =

2010 transient event in the constellation Delphinus

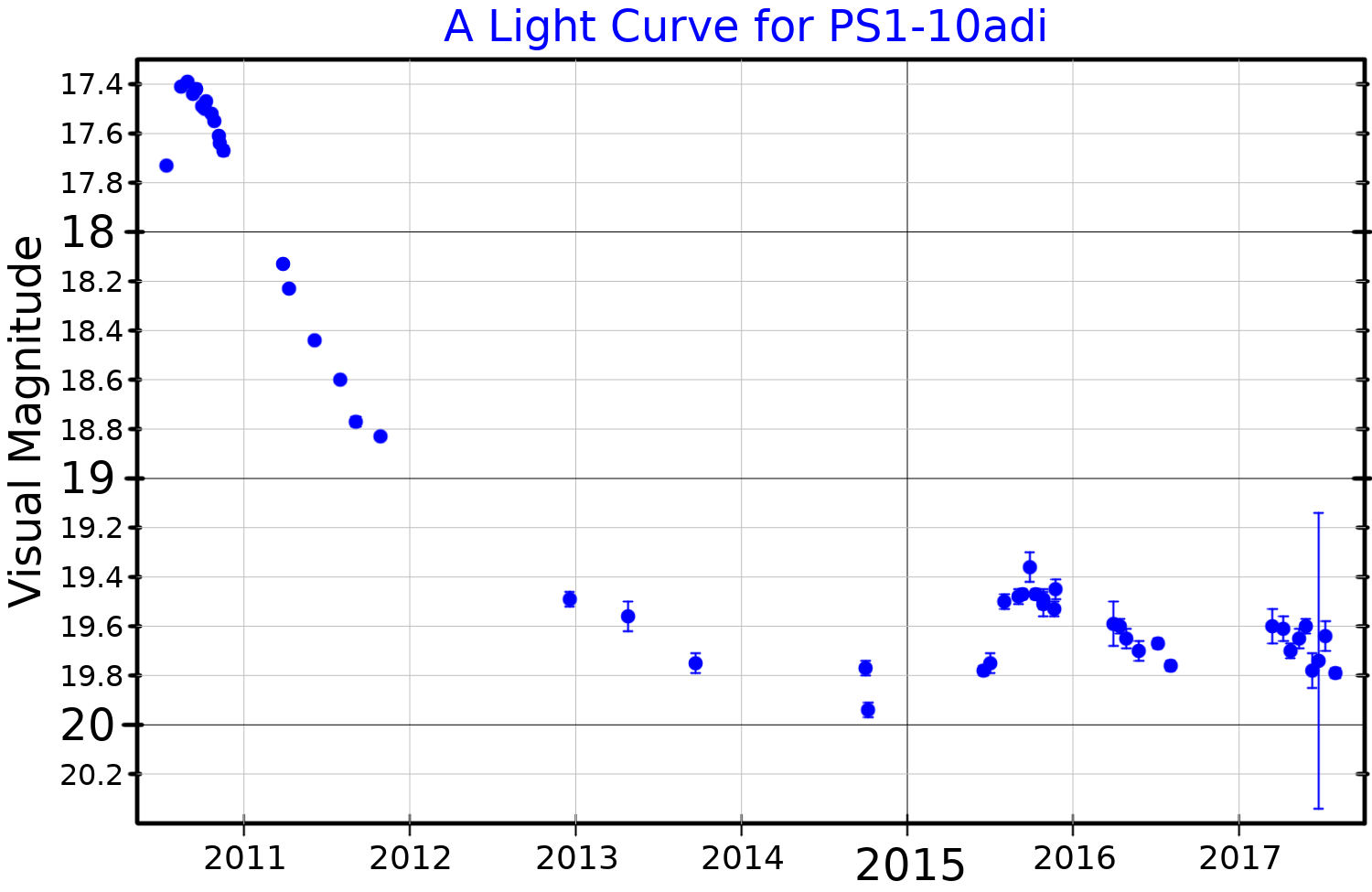
- A visual band light curve for PS1-10adi, plotted from data published by Kankare et al. (2017)

Observation data Epoch J2000 Equinox ICRS
- Constellation: Delphinus
- Right ascension: 20^{h} 42^{m} 44.749^{s}
- Declination: +15° 30′ 32.24″

Other designations
- PS1-1000789

Database references
SIMBAD	data

PS1-10adi is an unusual and highly energetic optical transient discovered by the Pan-STARRS survey on 15 August 2010. The explosion or transient event emitted 2.3×10^{52} ergs (2.3×10^{45} Joules), exceeding ASASSN-15lh. It may be a superluminous supernova or a stellar disruption event. The magnitude of the explosion challenges the limits of the current models for theoretical physics.

The event happened near the centre of J204244.74+153032.1 (a point in Delphinus, specifically right ascension in usual sexagesimal and then declination in decimal terms, with the point/spacing moved four places to the right in both cases). The optical transient peaked at two magnitudes brighter than its host galaxy, and remained brighter for 1000 days. Its distance can be implied by its galaxy's red shift of 0.203. Balmer emission lines due to hot hydrogen showed relative motions of up to 900 km/s. The lines also had a red shoulder. There was also a hot black body continuum spectrum showing temperatures dropping from 11,000K. No X-rays or radio waves were detected from the source.

Similar optical transients include PS1-13jw, CSS100217, J094806, J094608, and J233454.
