= ASASSN-15lh =

2015 hypernova event in the constellation Indus

ASASSN-15C
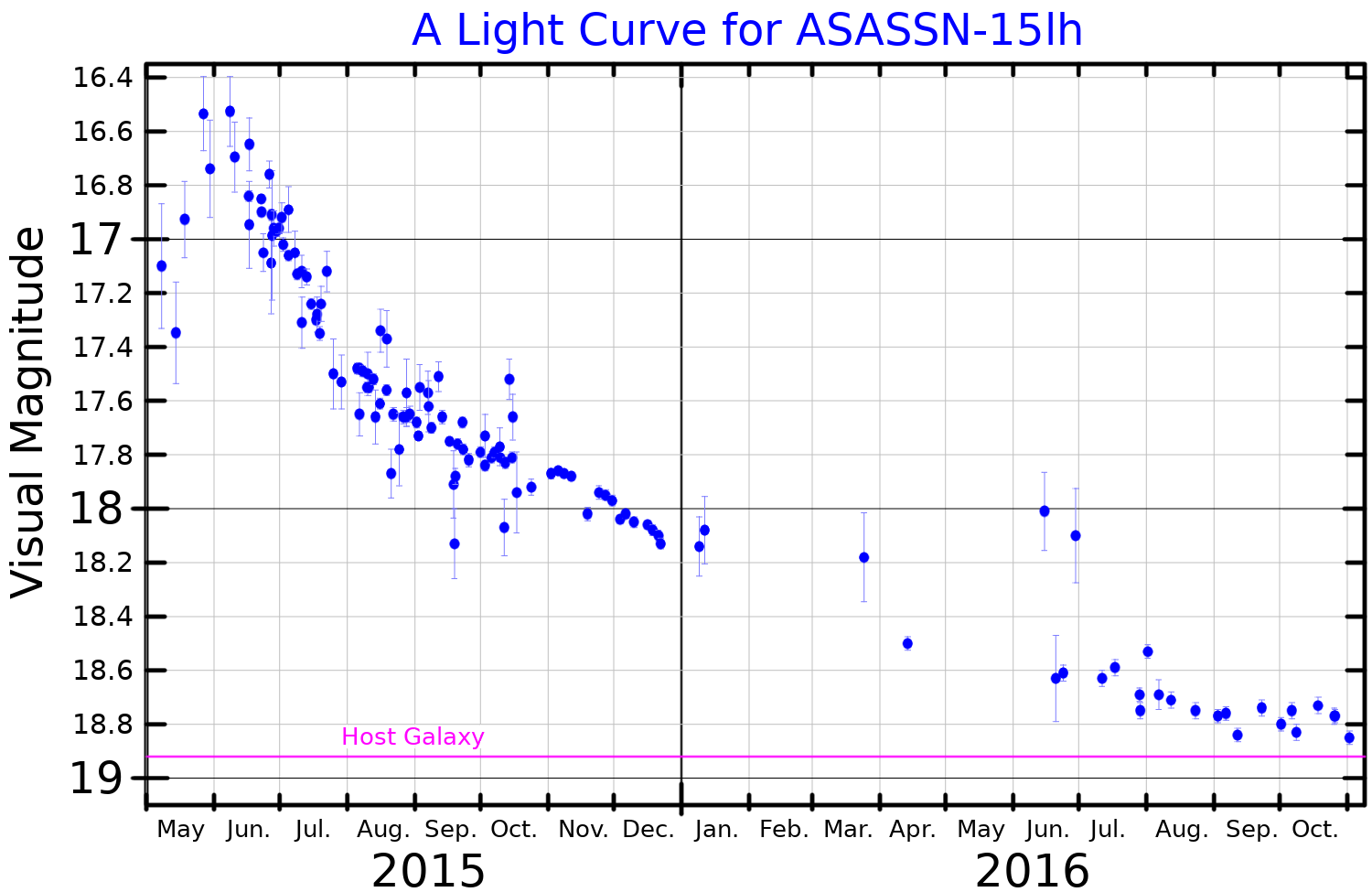
- A visual band light curve for ASASSN-15lh, plotted from data published by Godoy-Rivera et al. (2017). The purple line shows the brightness of the host galaxy.
- SLSNe (Type Ic), SNSLSN-I
- Constellation: Indus
- Right ascension: 22^{h} 2^{m} 15.45^{s}
- Declination: −61° 39′ 34.64″
- Distance: 1,171 megaparsecs 3.82 gigalight-years
- Redshift: 0.2326
- Host: APMUKS(BJ) B215839.70−615403.9
- Peak apparent magnitude: 16.9
- Other designations: SN 2015L
- Related media on Commons

ASASSN-15lh (supernova designation SN 2015L) is an extremely luminous astronomical transient event discovered by the All Sky Automated Survey for SuperNovae (ASAS-SN), with the appearance of a superluminous supernova event. It was first detected on June 14, 2015, located within a faint galaxy in the southern constellation Indus, and was the most luminous supernova-like object ever observed. At its peak, ASASSN-15lh was 570 billion times brighter than the Sun, and 20 times brighter than the combined light emitted by the Milky Way Galaxy. The emitted energy was exceeded by PS1-10adi.

The nature of ASASSN-15lh is disputed. The most popular explanations are that it is the most luminous Type I supernova (hypernova) ever observed, or a tidal disruption event around a 10^{8} M_{☉} supermassive black hole. Other hypotheses include gravitational lensing, a quark nova inside a Wolf–Rayet star, or a rapid magnetar spindown.

== Discovery ==
A possible supernova was first noticed during an observation in June 2015 by ASAS-SN's twin 14-cm telescopes located at Cerro Tololo Inter-American Observatory, Chile; the team gave it the designation ASASSN-15lh. It appeared as a transient dot of light on an image and was confirmed with additional observations from other telescopes. The spectrum of ASASSN-15lh was provided by the 2.5-meter du Pont Telescope in Chile. The Southern African Large Telescope was used to determine the redshift, and hence the distance and luminosity. The Swift space telescope also contributed observations. On July 24, the event formally received the supernova designation SN 2015L from the Central Bureau of Astronomical Telegrams.

Later, other images were found to have been made of ASASSN-15lh as early as May 8, 2015. At this stage the visual magnitude was 17.4. From May 8 the possible supernova brightened until it reached a peak brightness of magnitude 16.9 on June 5. By September the brightness had dropped to magnitude 18.2. There was an unusual "rebrightening" of up to 1.75 magnitudes at blue and ultraviolet wavelengths, starting about 90 days after the maximum. This coincided with a plateau in the bolometric luminosity that lasted for 120 days.

== Properties ==
Based on its redshift and location projected on the nucleus of a large galaxy, the distance of ASASSN-15lh is calculated at 1,171 Mpc, in a large luminous galaxy.

At its peak, the absolute magnitude of ASASSN-15lh in the AB magnitude system u band was −23.5. Its bolometric luminosity is twice that of the previous brightest type-I superluminous supernova, iPTF13ajg. At its brightest, it was approximately 50 times more luminous than the whole Milky Way galaxy, with an energy flux 570 billion times greater than the Sun. The total energy radiated in the first 50 days exceeded 1.1×10^{45} joules. According to Krzysztof Stanek of Ohio State University, one of the principal investigators at ASAS-SN, "If it was in our own galaxy, it would shine brighter than the full moon; there would be no night, and it would be easily seen during the day."

The spectrum of ASASSN-15lh was relatively featureless, with no hydrogen or helium lines, but two very broad absorption bands. Ionised magnesium absorption doublets were detected and used to confirm the redshift at 0.2326.

The temperature of ASASSN-15lh at the time of maximum luminosity was 20,000 K, although it was hotter earlier in the outburst. By 50 days after the peak, the temperature had declined to 11,000 K and then remained relatively constant. The radius of ASASSN-15lh at peak brightness was over 70,000 R_{☉}. The mass of ASSASN-15lh is 40 M_{☉}

== Host galaxy ==
The host galaxy for ASASSN-15lh is APMUKS(BJ) B215839.70−615403.9, much larger and more luminous than the Milky Way. The host galaxy has visual magnitude 18.5 and is red in color with a low rate of star formation. It maintained a steady brightness until the supernova lit up. The strongest parts of the galaxy's spectrum have wavelengths around 1 μm in the near infrared.

== Suggested mechanisms ==
The precise mechanism underlying the very large ASASSN-15lh explosion is still unknown, with speculation ranging from the presence of very large quantities of decaying nickel-56 to the amplifying effects of a magnetar. Its unusual location in a relatively quiescent galaxy may offer clues for scientists to discover and observe similar events.

=== Superluminous supernova ===
The initial hypothesis was that ASASSN-15lh was the most extreme superluminous supernova (SLSN) so far seen, but it was recognized as being unusual in several respects. The spectrum did not closely match other Type I SLSNe and previous SLSNe have been discovered in relatively small active star-producing galaxies, not in the central regions of large galaxies. The double-peaked light curve is not expected from a SLSN and the total energy output approaches theoretical limits.

The lack of hydrogen and helium features in the spectrum suggest an explosion originating in an object lacking both hydrogen and helium, which would imply a highly stripped star such as a massive Wolf–Rayet star. The energetics of the explosion would require a massive star.

=== Magnetar ===
One model for unusually luminous supernovae involves the conversion of rotational energy from a rapidly-spinning neutron star into polar jets that heat surrounding material. Again, the energy produced by ASASSN-15lh strains the theoretical limits of this type of explosion and the detailed properties are difficult to reproduce with a magnetar model.

=== Quark nova ===
One unusual explanation for ASASSN-15lh is a quark-nova within the supernova explosion from a WO-type Wolf-Rayet star. The quark nova is produced by the neutron star remnant of the supernova and occurs a few days after the core collapse of the Wolf-Rayet star. This can reproduce many of the unusual features of the observed event but is somewhat speculative and not widely accepted.

=== Tidal disruption event (TDE) ===
One known method for producing extremely large amounts of energy is the tidal disruption of objects such as stars by a supermassive black hole. ASASSN-15lh occurred in the nucleus of a large passive galaxy where a supermassive black hole is likely. A black hole of the mass expected in the host galaxy of ASASSN-15lh would normally swallow stars without a visible flare. The conditions for the production of a highly luminous flare from a TDE around a black hole of the expected mass are unusual, but a rapidly-spinning Kerr black hole might be able to disrupt a star with a mass similar to the sun outside the event horizon and produce a hot accretion disc and luminous transient. It could also account for the temperature changes, rebrightening, and unusual spectral evolution. However, lack of hydrogen and/or helium lines in the spectra of ASASSN-15lh poses a major problem for the TDE scenario.

=== Gravitational lensing ===
Unexpectedly bright visible objects can be produced by gravitational lensing of very distant objects by extremely massive objects closer to Earth. However, this usually occurs with objects much more distant than ASASSN-15lh, and there are no observations indicating the presence of a galaxy cluster suitable to produce a lensing effect.

== See also ==
- List of supernovae
- Hypergiant
- Quark star
