= Foe (unit) =

Unit of energy

A foe is a unit of energy equal to 10^{44} joules or 10^{51} ergs, used to express the large amount of energy released by a supernova. An acronym for "[ten to the power of] fifty-one ergs", the term was introduced by Gerald E. Brown of Stony Brook University in his work with Hans Bethe, because "it came up often enough in our work".

Without mentioning the foe, Steven Weinberg proposed in 2006 "a new unit called the bethe" (B) with the same value, to "replace" it. (Note: "Following the death of Hans Bethe last year, I have proposed a new unit called the bethe, where 1 B is 10^{51} ergs or 10^{44} J. This would replace the unit of 10^{51} ergs, which is commonly used by those studying supernovae – a field in which Bethe worked. Ian Mills, president of the consultative committee on units of the International Committee for Weights and Measures, has concurred and agreed that the bethe can be used.")

This unit of measure is convenient because a supernova typically releases about one foe of observable energy in a very short period (which can be measured in seconds). In comparison, if the Sun's current luminosity is the same as its average luminosity over its lifetime, it would release about 1.2 foe. (Note: 3.827×10^{26} W × 3.1536×10^{7} sec/y × 10^{10} yr) One solar mass has a rest mass energy of 1,787 foe.

== See also ==
- Orders of magnitude (energy)
