= Oded Regev (physicist) =

Israeli astrophysicist

- עודד רגב
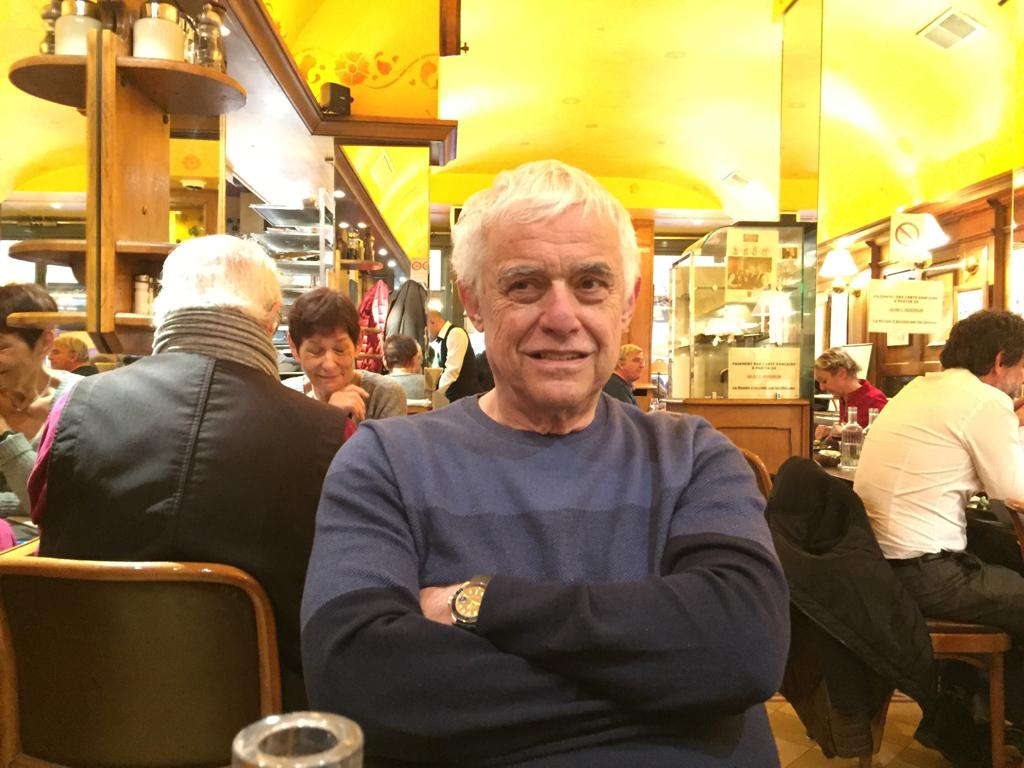
- Born: 25 October 1946 (age 78); Wałbrzych, Poland
- Known for: Astrophysical fluid dynamics
- Scientific career
- Fields: Physics, fluid dynamics
- Doctoral advisor: Giora Shaviv
- Notable students: Noam Soker, Nir Shaviv

Oded Regev (Hebrew: עודד רגב; born 1946) is a physicist and astrophysicist, professor emeritus of the Technion, Israel Institute of Technology. He is best known for his theoretical application of fluid dynamics and dynamical systems theory to astrophysics.

== Career ==
Regev was born in Poland and emigrated to Israel in 1958. His academic career was mainly in Israel. He studied physics and mathematics at the Hebrew University of Jerusalem, with graduate studies and a Ph.D. at Tel Aviv University, and became a faculty member at the Technion – Israel Institute of Technology. During his studies he served four years in the Israel Defense Forces and continued to serve in the reserve units, reaching the rank of major. In 2002 he moved to the US.

== Contributions ==
His early numerical calculations (with G. Shaviv) of a rotating gas sphere gravitational collapse (1980) were the first to show that a central object (a star) is formed surrounded by a protoplanetary disk-like nebula, provided turbulent viscosity is included. Together with J.R. Buchler he found a simplistic model of a stellar oscillator that exhibited chaotic pulsation. This oscillator was later found to be related to the Moore-Spiegel oscillator.

He was among the discoverers of the advection dominated accretion flows (ADAF) which became a very popular idea in modeling accretion disks around black holes.

In his later years he concentrated on theory of accretion disks applying mathematical approximation methods that were novel to astrophysics. He investigated instabilities of accretion disks that may give rise to angular momentum transport, excluding the possibility that the magneto-rotational instability may develop beyond linear stage in thin, disks with very low magnetic Prandtl number as such structures usually are.

== Books ==
Regev is the author of :

- Physics with Answers: 500 Problems and Solutions (with Andrew R. King, Cambridge University Press, 1997)
- Chaos and Complexity in Astrophysics (Cambridge University Press, 2010)
- Asymptotic Approximation Methods in Astrophysical Fluid Dynamics: Techniques and Example Applications (with Orkan M. Umuthan, VDM Verlag, 2010)
- Modern Fluid Dynamics for Physics and Astrophysics (with Orkan M. Umurhan and Philip A. Yecko, Graduate Texts in Physics, Springer, 2016)
