= Mjølnir crater =

Meteorite crater in the Barents Sea

- Location within Arctic
- Location: Barents Sea, Norway; 73°48′N 29°40′E

Impact crater structure
- Confidence: Confirmed
- Diameter: 40 km (25 mi)
- Age: 142.0 ± 2.6 Ma; Early Cretaceous
- Exposed: No
- Drilled: Yes

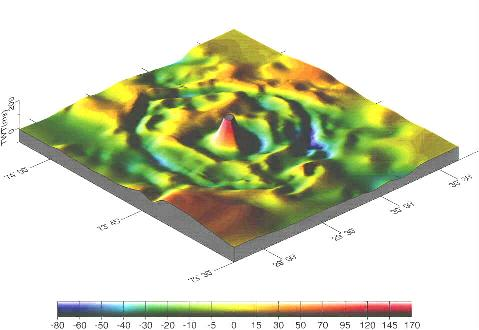
Astrobleme Mjolnir, Seismic two-way travel time Image

Mjølnir is a meteorite crater on the floor of Barents Sea off the coast of Norway. It is 40 km (25 mi) in diameter and the age is estimated to be 142.0 ± 2.6 million years (Early Cretaceous). The bolide was an estimated 2 km (1.2 mi) wide.

== Etymology ==
Mjølnir is the name of Thor's mythological hammer. Giving the crater this name was presumably an allusion to the power of the weapon, which is often described as breaking and smashing rocks.

== Description ==
In 2006, a group of Swedish geologists discovered indications of a tsunami flooding the Swedish southern coast at about 145 million years ago. It is speculated to be associated with the Mjølnir impact, together with similar indications discovered in 2000 in France.
