= Failed supernova =

Star that dies but does not explode

A failed supernova is an astronomical event in time domain astronomy in which a star suddenly brightens as in the early stage of a supernova, but then does not increase to the massive flux of a supernova. They could be counted as a subcategory of supernova imposters. They have sometimes misleadingly been called unnovae.

== Overview ==
Failed supernovae are thought to create stellar black holes by the collapsing of a red supergiant star in the early stages of a supernova. When the star can no longer support itself, the core collapses completely, forming a stellar-mass black hole, and consuming the nascent supernova without having the massive explosion. For a distant observer, the red supergiant star will seem to wink out of existence with little or no flare-up. The observed instances of these disappearances seem to involve supergiant stars with masses above 17 solar masses.

Failed supernovae are one of several events that theoretically signal the advent of a black hole born from an extremely massive star, others including hypernovae and long-duration gamma-ray bursts.

== Structure and process ==
Theoretically, a red supergiant star may be too massive to explode into a supernova, and collapse directly into being a black hole, without the bright flash. They would however generate a burst of gravitational waves. This process would occur in the higher mass red supergiants, explaining the absence of observed supernovae with such progenitors.

== List of failed supernovae candidates ==
Event	Date	Location	Notes
NGC3021-CANDIDATE-1		NGC 3021; 09^{h} 50^{m} 55.39^{s} +33° 33′ 14.5″	Disappearance of a 25-30 M_{Sun} F8 supergiant observed in archival HST data
N6946-BH1	March 2009	NGC 6946; 20^{h} 35^{m} 27.56^{s} +60° 08′ 08.2″	Disappearance of an 18-25 M_{Sun} red supergiant
M31-2014-DS1		Andromeda Galaxy	Disappearance of an 20 M_{Sun} yellow supergiant
