= Hydra A =

Ecliptical Galaxy in the constellation of Hydra

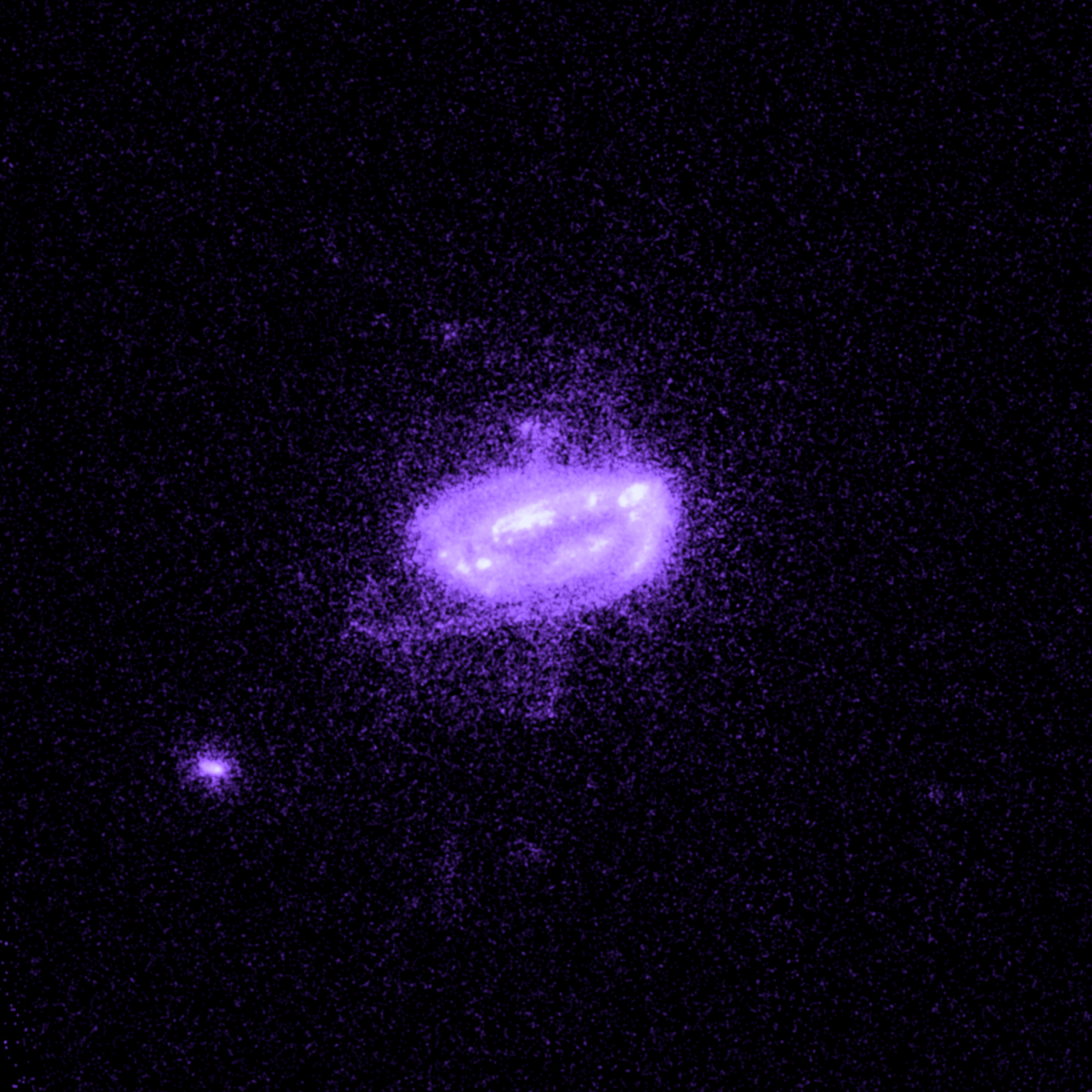
- Hydra A imaged by Hubble Space Telescope

Observation data (J2000.0 epoch)
- Constellation: Hydra
- Right ascension: 09^{h} 18^{m} 05.6680^{s}
- Declination: −12° 05′ 43.806″
- Redshift: 0.054878 ± 0.00008
- Heliocentric radial velocity: 16,452 km/s ± 24
- Distance: 840 Mly
- Apparent magnitude (V): 14.31

Characteristics
- Type: (R')SA0^-?
- Size: ~348,000 ly (106.7 kpc) (estimated)

Other designations
- Hydra A, MCG -02-24-007, 3C 218, PKS 0915-11, WISEA J091805.68-120543.9, PGC 26269

Hydra A (also known as 3C 218), is a giant elliptical galaxy with an active galactic nucleus and has a redshift of (z) 0.054. Since its designation as Hydra A, the galaxy is located in the constellation of Hydra at a distance of 840 million light-years according to redshift values. It was discovered in 1952 by the Australian astronomer Bernard Mills during a survey of strong radio sources. Hydra A is one of the brightest X-ray sources in the sky as seen from Earth. It is also categorized as a Type-cD galaxy.

== Observation ==
Hydra A is located in a galaxy cluster named ClG 0915.7-1153 containing six galaxies. According to the redshift values of the different galaxies measured by the NOAO Fundamental Plane Survey and the X-ray distance measurement by the ROSAT X-ray space telescope, the cluster ClG 0915.7-1153 is located at 742 million light-years. According to studies, the cluster is said to be part of another galaxy cluster called Abell 780, with Hydra A likely dominating the optical center. A secondary nucleus is suggested to be located around 14 kiloparsecs away from the primary nucleus with an angle orientation of 125°.

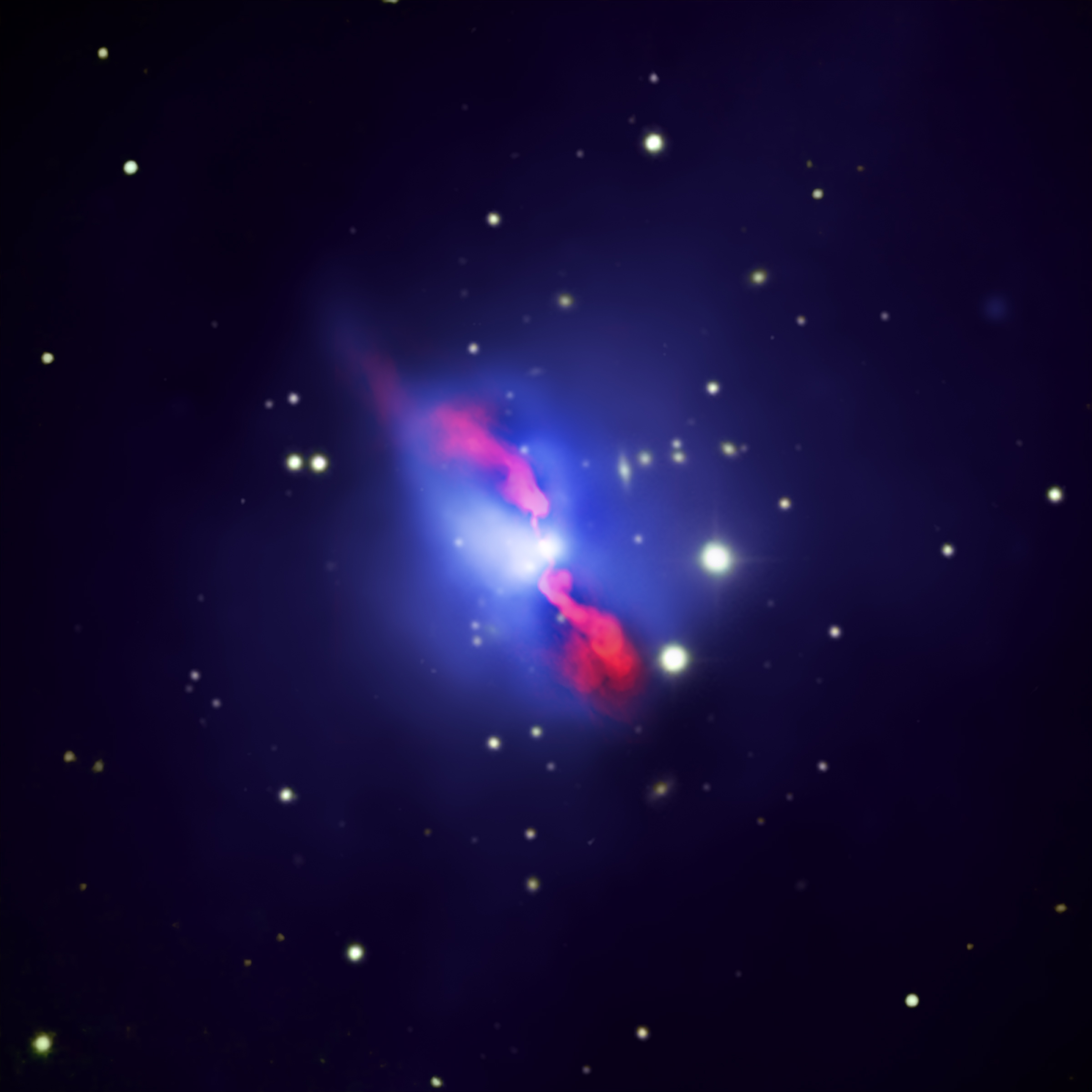
Composite Image of Hydra A with the jets

In 2009, a Chandra X-ray Observatory study of Hydra A revealed the first images showing that Hydra A's central black hole experienced a very violent eruption that propelled iron-rich gas in the form of an extremely hot jet of matter with a temperature of 10 million K. Evidence of powerful explosions from the supermassive black hole at the galaxy's center is visible in the data from Chandra in X-ray and in the radio emission jets observed by the Very Large Array and in optical wavelength from the Canada-France-Hawaii Telescope and the Digitized Sky Survey show galaxies in the cluster ClG 0915.7-1153. An analysis of the Chandra data shows that the gas along the direction of the radio jets is enriched in iron and other metals. It is believed these elements were produced by a Type Ia supernova explosions in a large galaxy at the center of the cluster. A powerful explosion from the supermassive black hole then pushed the material outward, over distances spanning nearly 400,000 light-years. About 10 to 20 percent of the galaxy's iron was displaced, requiring a few percent of the total energy produced by the central black hole. The explosions from the central supermassive black hole not only pushed elements outward but also created a series of cavities in the hot gas. As these jets traveled through the galaxy in the surrounding multi-million-degree intergalactic gas, they pushed the hot gas aside to create the cavities. A relatively recent explosion created a pair of cavities visible as dark regions in the Chandra X-ray Observatory image surrounding the radio emission (in red). These cavities are so large they could contain the entire Milky Way, but they are dwarfed by even larger cavities, too faint to be seen in this image created by older, more powerful explosions of the black hole. The larger of these cavities is immense, spanning about 670,000 light-years. In several respects, this case resembles that of NeVe 1, MS 0735.6+7421 and RX J1532.9+3021.

== Central black hole mass ==
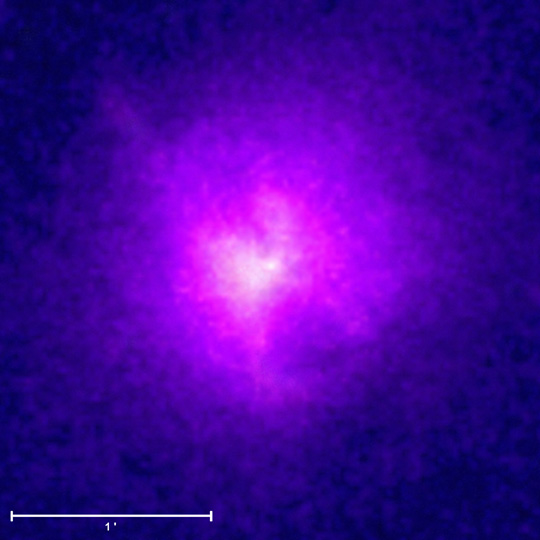
Image of the center of Hydra A

Thanks to data recorded by the CXO and the VLA, the mass of the black hole could be estimated. Based on X-ray and radio emissions, as well as the speed and heat of the jets, the black hole's mass is estimated at 900,000,000 solar masses (M_{☉}; 1.8×10^{39} kg), making it 200 times more massive than the Milky Way's supermassive black hole, also known as Sagittarius A*. A team of five American astronomers working with CXO data estimated that the black hole erupted approximately 2 to 5 million years ago, with the two jets having an estimated power of 1×10^{61} ergs (1×10^{54} J). The black hole is thought to have propelled matter in the form of a jet over a distance of 300,000 parsecs (980,000 ly) and the matter would have cooled over a distance of 100,000 parsecs (330,000 ly) before the jet stopped. The black hole eruption would have been caused by the fall of an immense amount of matter into the black hole, which would have absorbed more than 0.25 to 0.1 M_{☉} per year. This configuration results in a black hole of 10 billion M_{☉}, much larger than previously estimated. X- ray and radio measurements show that the center would be surrounded by a disk of cold gas expelled by the black hole. A comparison of the X-ray emission and the Eddington ratio allowed calculations of the mass of the central black hole. According to the calculations, such an eruption implies a black hole with a mass of 4 billion M_{☉}.
