= GRB 221009A =

Record-breaking gamma-ray burst

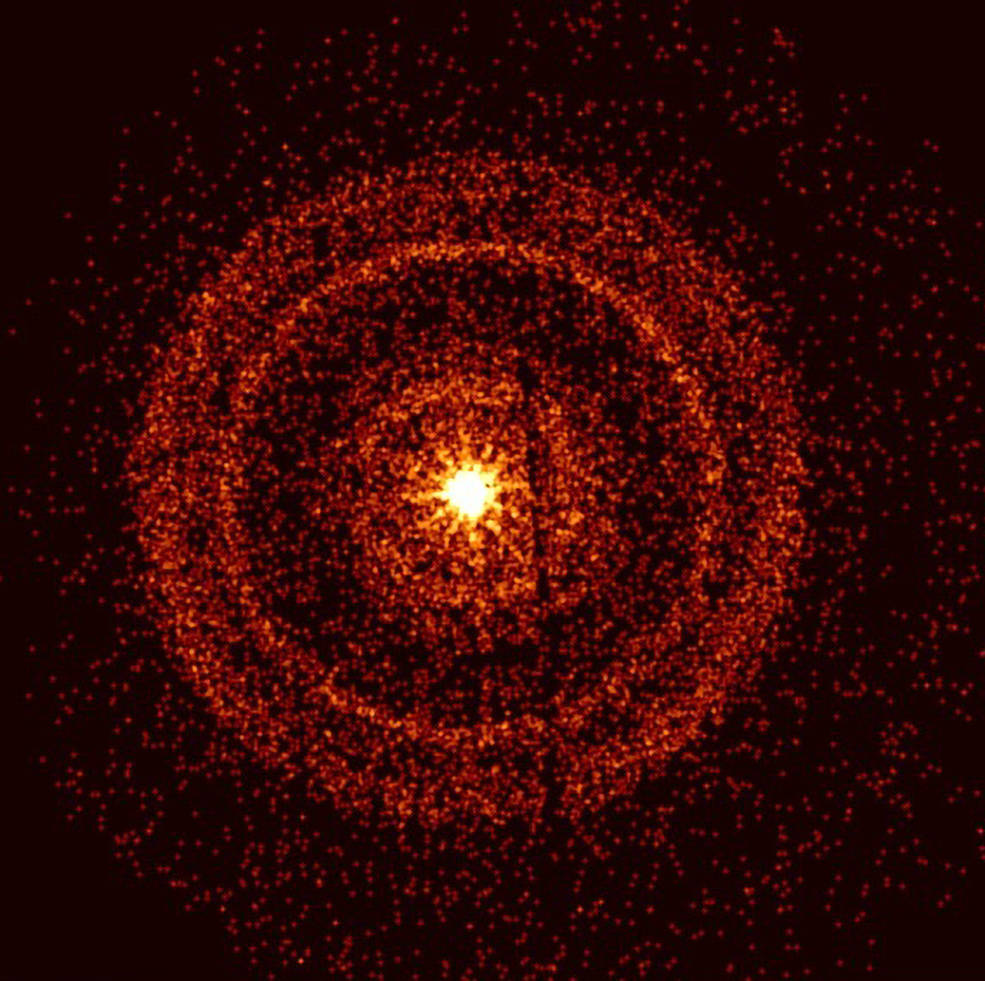
- Swift's X-ray image of GRB 221009A shows circular rings around the gamma-ray burst. Dust in the Milky Way scattered the x-ray emission of the gamma-ray burst, creating the rings.
- Event type: Gamma-ray burst
- Date: c. 1.9 billion years ago (detected 9 October 2022)
- Duration: 10 minutes
- Instrument: Swift and Fermi Gamma-ray Space Telescope
- Constellation: Sagitta
- Right ascension: 19^{h} 13^{m} 03.48^{s}
- Declination: +19° 46′ 24.6″
- Distance: c. 2.4 billion ly
- Redshift: 0.151
- Other designations: Swift J1913.1+1946
- Related media on Commons

GRB 221009A was an extraordinarily bright and very energetic gamma-ray burst (GRB) jointly discovered by the Neil Gehrels Swift Observatory and the Fermi Gamma-ray Space Telescope on October 9, 2022. The gamma-ray burst was ten minutes long, but was detectable for more than ten hours following initial detection. Despite being around 2.4 billion light-years away, it was powerful enough to affect Earth's atmosphere, having the strongest effect ever recorded by a gamma-ray burst on the planet. The peak luminosity of GRB 221009A was measured by Konus-Wind to be ~ 2.1 × 10^{47} W and by Fermi Gamma-ray Burst Monitor to be ~ 1.0 × 10^{47} W over its 1.024s interval. A burst as energetic and as close to Earth as 221009A is thought to be a once-in-10,000-year event or, alternatively, a member of a new class of narrow-jet bursts. It is the brightest and most energetic gamma-ray burst ever recorded, dubbed the BOAT, or Brightest Of All Time.

== Characterization ==
GRB 221009A came from the constellation of Sagitta and occurred an estimated 1.9 billion years ago, however its source is now 2.4 billion light-years away from Earth due to the expansion of the universe during the time-of-flight to Earth. The burst's high-intensity emissions spanned 15 orders of magnitude on the electromagnetic spectrum, from radio emissions to gamma rays. Radio signals broadcast by the winding down of whatever process created the initial burst will likely linger for years to come. This broadband emission offers the rare opportunity to study normally-fleeting GRBs in unprecedented detail.

== Observation ==
The burst saturated the Fermi Gamma-ray Space Telescope's detector, which captured gamma ray photons with energies exceeding 100 GeV. GRB 221009A is by far the most productive event for very high-energy (VHE) photons ever witnessed by scientific instrumentation. Before GRB 221009A, the number of very high-energy photons detected over the entire history of GRB astronomy numbered only a few hundred. The burst also marked the first time that very high-energy (VHE) photon emissions from a GRB were detected during the early epoch. When the burst's radiation arrived at Earth the Large High Altitude Air Shower Observatory (LHAASO) alone saw more than 5,000 such VHE photons. Some of these photons arrived at Earth carrying a record 18 TeV of energy, which is more than can be produced at the Large Hadron Collider (LHC) at the European Center for Nuclear Research (CERN). Russia's Carpet-2 facility at the Baksan Neutrino Observatory may have also recorded a single 251-TeV photon from this burst. These detected energies are far more than GRB 190114C, which had up to 1 TeV of energy, and GRB 190829A, which had up to 3.3 TeV of energy, with 221009A being the first and only GRB so far to have photons above 10 TeV. The burst possibly had the signature of accelerating ultra-high-energy cosmic rays for the first time, with one study estimating that if cosmic rays were accelerated by the burst, they probably would have reached energies of 1 ZeV or greater (10^{21} electronvolts), almost an order of magnitude more energetic than the Oh-My-God particle, which is the highest-energy cosmic ray ever observed. It is unlikely that this event resulted in the formation of heavier elements in significant amounts via the rapid neutron capture or r-process.

GRB 221009A was subsequently observed by the Neutron Star Interior Composition Explorer (NICER), the Monitor of All-sky X-ray Image (MAXI), the Imaging X-ray Polarimetry Explorer (IXPE), the International Gamma-ray Astrophysics Laboratory (INTEGRAL), the XMM-Newton space telescope, the Large High Altitude Air Shower Observatory (LHAASO) and many others.

== Origin ==
Observations with the James Webb Space Telescope (JWST) have confirmed that GRB 221009A was caused by a massive star undergoing a supernova. The supernova was a Type Ic supernova, similar to SN 1998bw, the first supernova linked to a GRB.

Lightning detectors in India and Germany picked up signs that the Earth's ionosphere was perturbed for several hours by the burst, though only mildly, as well as an enormous influx of electrically charged particles, showing just how powerful it was. Further, a number of studies have described the relativistic jet of this gamma-ray burst as having an unusual structure.

== Record magnitude ==
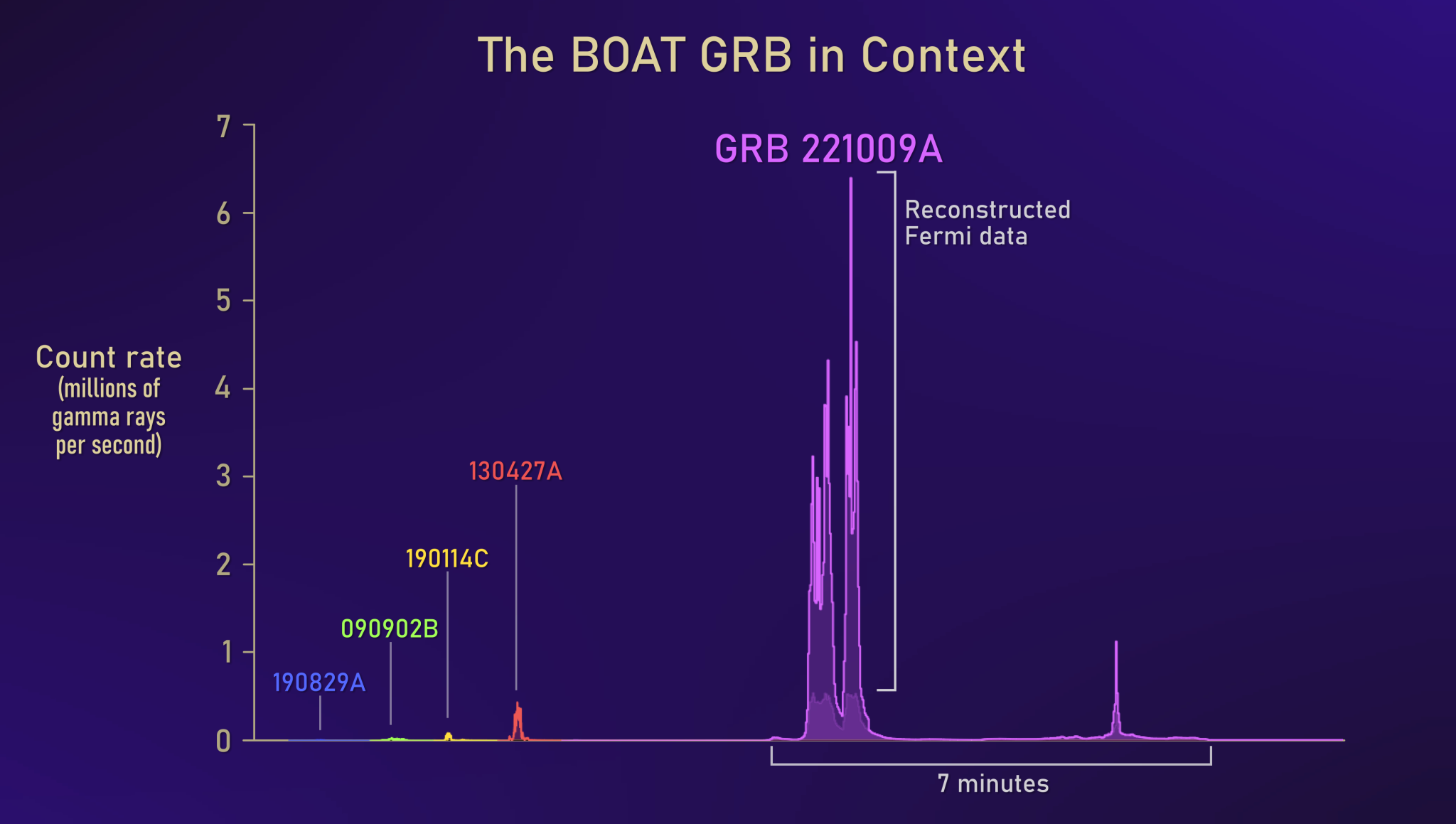
This chart compares GRB 221009A's prompt emission to that of four previous record-holding long gamma-ray bursts.

Some astronomers referred to the burst as the "brightest of all time", or by the acronym "BOAT". Dan Perley, an astrophysicist at the Astrophysics Research Institute at Liverpool John Moores University, stated that "There is nothing in human experience that comes anywhere remotely close to such an outpouring of energy. Nothing." Eric Burns, an astronomer at Louisiana State University, also stated about the energy of the burst that "The energy of this thing is so extreme that if you took the entire Sun and you converted all of it into pure energy, it still wouldn't match this event. There's just nothing comparable." The power of gamma-ray bursts may be gauged by the degree of interaction between the gamma rays they emit and the ubiquitous lanes of interstellar dust in deep space. Such interactions generate an afterglow in X-ray frequencies, usually seen as concentric rings of scattered X-rays with the gamma ray burst at the center. GRB 221009A is only the seventh gamma-ray burst known to have generated these rings, and as of March 2023, a record twenty X-ray afterglow rings had been identified around the burst, triple the previous record. The afterglow of GRB 221009A was the brightest ever recorded, beating the record of GRB 030329. The burst also had the brightest X-ray afterglow ever recorded, with the X-ray afterglow being around a thousand times brighter than the typical GRB. It also had the brightest UVOT afterglow ever recorded once corrected for extinction. It had the largest amount of energy ever recorded in the TeV range, and had the most energetic photons ever recorded for a GRB, peaking at 18 TeV. An air shower with an estimated primary energy of 300 TeV was identified as well, coinciding with the GRB's direction and timing, being the highest-energy event associated with a GRB. The burst was ten times brighter than any previous GRB detected by the Swift mission. It was the brightest and most intense GRB detected by KONUS-Wind. The prompt emission of the burst far surpassed anything before it, far exceeding four previous GRB record-holders, as no GRB had been recorded delivering more than 500,000 gamma-ray photons-per-second, yet this GRB peaked at over 6 million photons-per-second. The burst was so bright that it blinded most gamma-ray instruments in space, preventing a true recording of its intensity. It was even detected by satellites not designed to detect gamma-ray bursts, such as Voyager 1 and a pair of Mars orbiters. GRB 221009A could have produced multi-TeV gamma rays for more than a week after the prompt phase, with this feature being unique to GRB 221009A, far longer compared to other bursts such as GRB 180720B, which produced multi-TeV gamma rays for ten hours after the prompt phase, and GRB 190829A, which produced multi-TeV gamma rays for nearly three days after the prompt phase.

Despite being around two billion light-years away, the burst was powerful enough to affect Earth's atmosphere, having the strongest effect ever recorded by a gamma-ray burst on the planet. It triggered instruments generally reserved for studying solar flares, with solar physicist Laura Hayes at the ESA stating that it left an "imprint comparable to that of a major solar flare" from the nearby Sun, meaning the burst had the same effect as a solar flare over 100 trillion times closer, with the burst being equivalent to a C3 to M1 class solar flare based on the VLF amplitude increase. Also significant is that the burst was detectable in daytime observations, where solar radiation dominates, as compared to the night-time ionosphere, which is much more sensitive to external disturbances, when solar radiation is not dominating, showing just how large the burst was. It also disrupted longwave radio communications.

With a radiated isotropic-energy of around 1.2×10^{55} erg or even 3×10^{55} erg, to as high as 1.4×10^{57} erg, GRB 221009A, together with events such as 1.5×10^{53} AT 2021lwx, the 10^{61} erg MS 0735.6+7421 event, and the 5×10^{61} erg Ophiuchus Supercluster eruption, are among the most energetic events ever. However, AT 2021lwx occurred over a span of three years, while the eruptions were high-energy low-power events occurring over millions of years as compared to GRB 221009A, which occurred over a minuscule time frame in comparison. In the binary-driven hypernova model, the isotropic total of the burst is its true energy total. Even the kinetic energy alone has its record to values of ∼5 × 10^{53} erg and even higher assuming a collimation according the traditional top-hat model for GRBs jets, breaking the previous records at 10^{52} erg. Physicist and author Don Lincoln described it as being the "greatest cosmic explosion humanity has ever seen".

== Possible pair annihilation ==
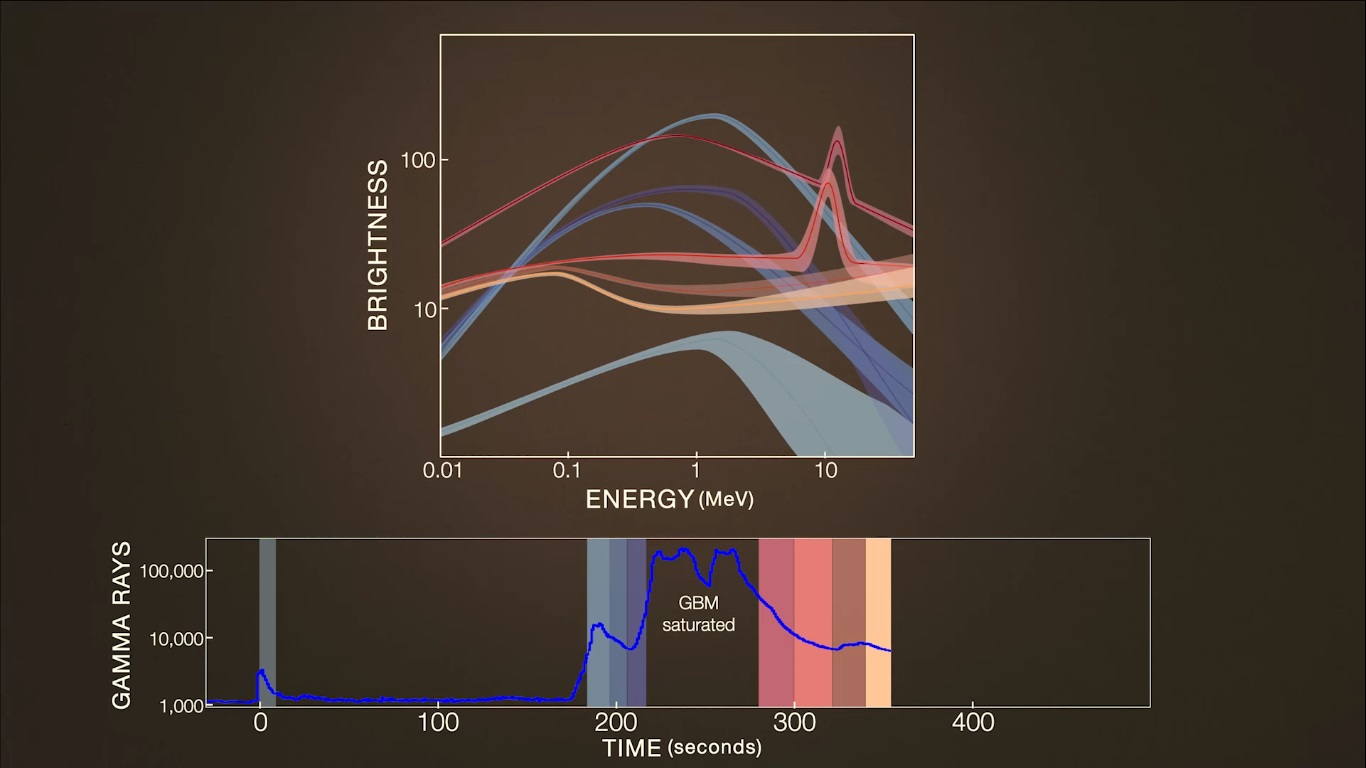
Spectra of GRB 221009A with a peak in two of the intervals in red from possible pair annihilation.

Reanalysis of the data from Fermi Gamma-ray Space Telescope revealed with 6.2σ significance an emission line 5 minutes after the burst was detected and after it had dimmed enough to end saturation effects of the instruments. The signal persisted for at least 40 seconds, and reached a peak with energy of about 12 MeV and luminosity of about 0.43×10^{50} erg/s that has been interpreted as electron–positron annihilation blueshifted from the usual 0.511 MeV at which the low-energy case should occur due to strong energy of the relativistic jet which itself can look as a superluminal jet.

== Relevance to new physics ==
Through comparison of data collected by different observatories, scientists concluded that the 221009A event was 50 to 70 times brighter than the previous record holder, along with it being far more energetic than the previous record holder. The extremely bright peak and long afterglow may help physicists study the manner in which matter interacts at relativistic speeds, the only known regime capable of generating gamma-ray photons with more than 100 GeV of energy. GRB 221009A has enabled scientists to impose stringent limits on any violations of Lorentz invariance proposed in certain theories of quantum gravity. Studies of 221009A and similarly extreme events are at present humanity's only access to particles with energies larger than any that can be generated artificially. The close examination of 221009A may eventually yield physical explanations that are neither predicted by nor accounted for in the Standard Model. It has become the most studied gamma-ray burst in history.

== Gallery ==
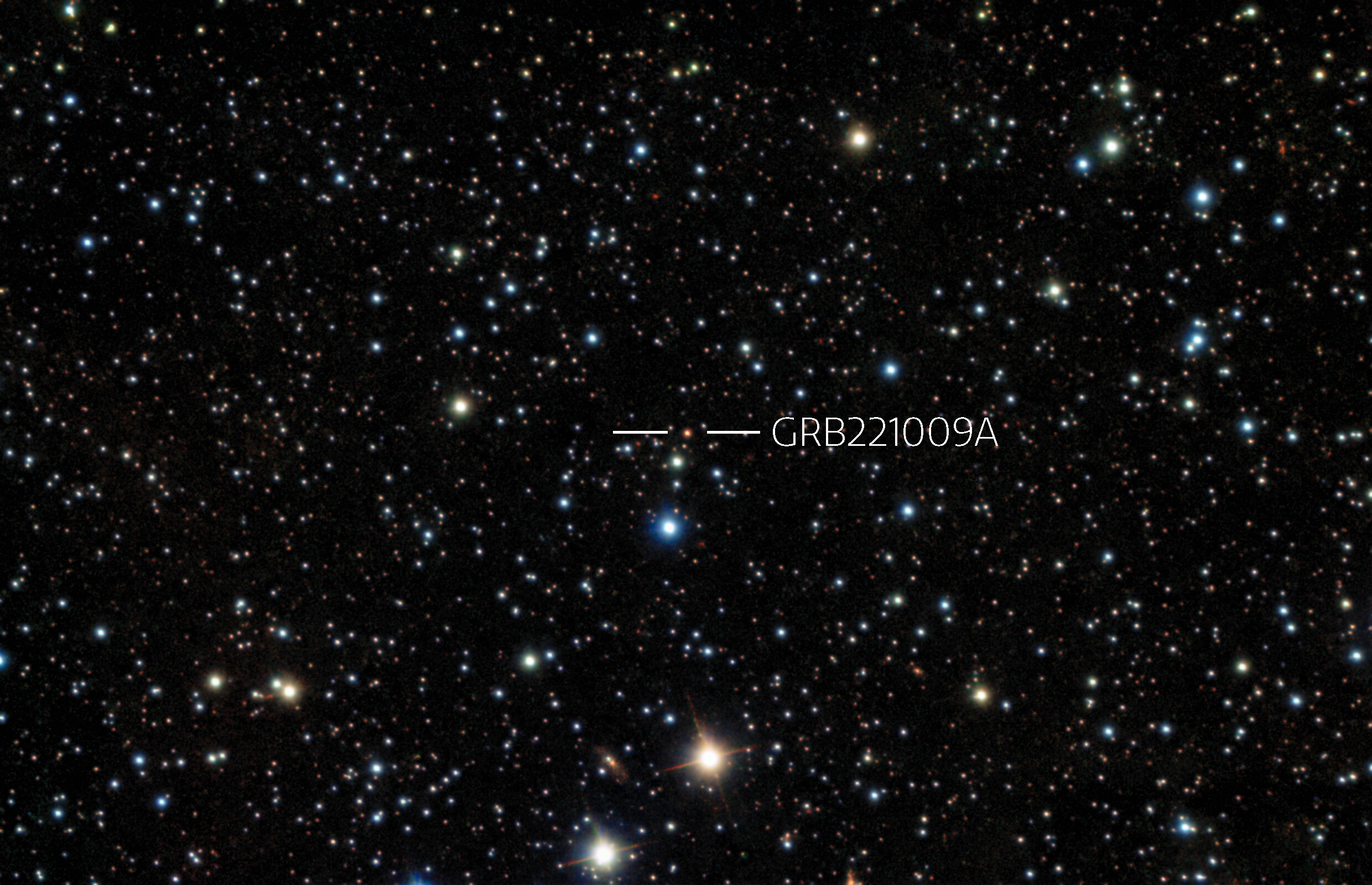
Near-simultaneous observations were made of GRB221009A from Gemini South in Chile. The image is a combination of 4 exposures in I, J, H, K with two instruments taken in the morning of Friday, October 14, 2022.
Ten-hour timelapse of GRB 221009A, as seen by the Fermi Gamma-ray Space Telescope.

Timelapse from images captured over 12 days by the X-ray Telescope aboard NASA's Neil Gehrels Swift Observatory. Rings appear as dust in the Milky Way galaxy scatters the light towards Earth.

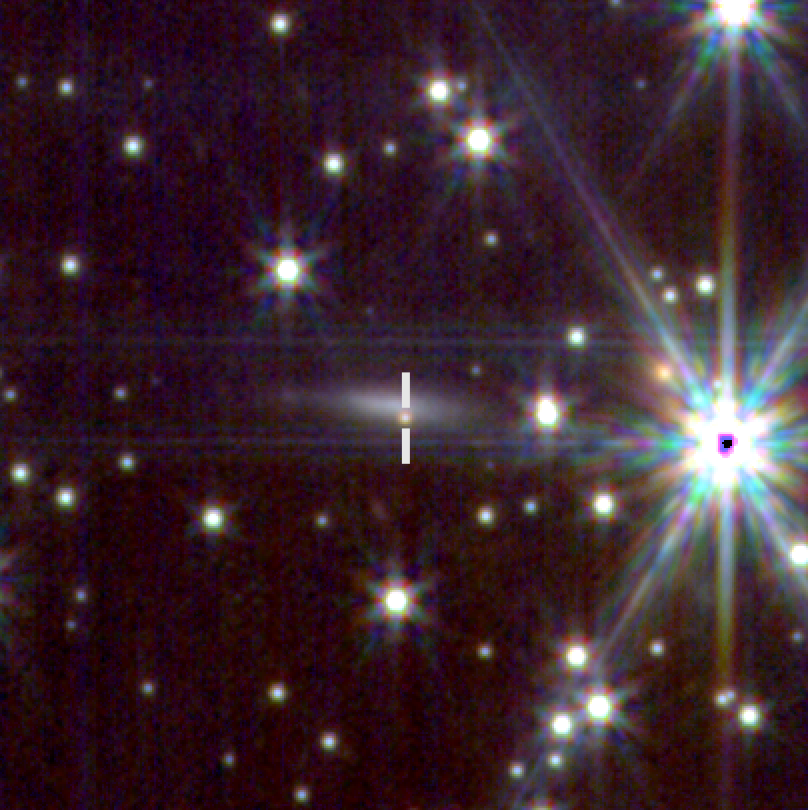
Near-infrared afterglow and host seen by Webb's NIRCam.

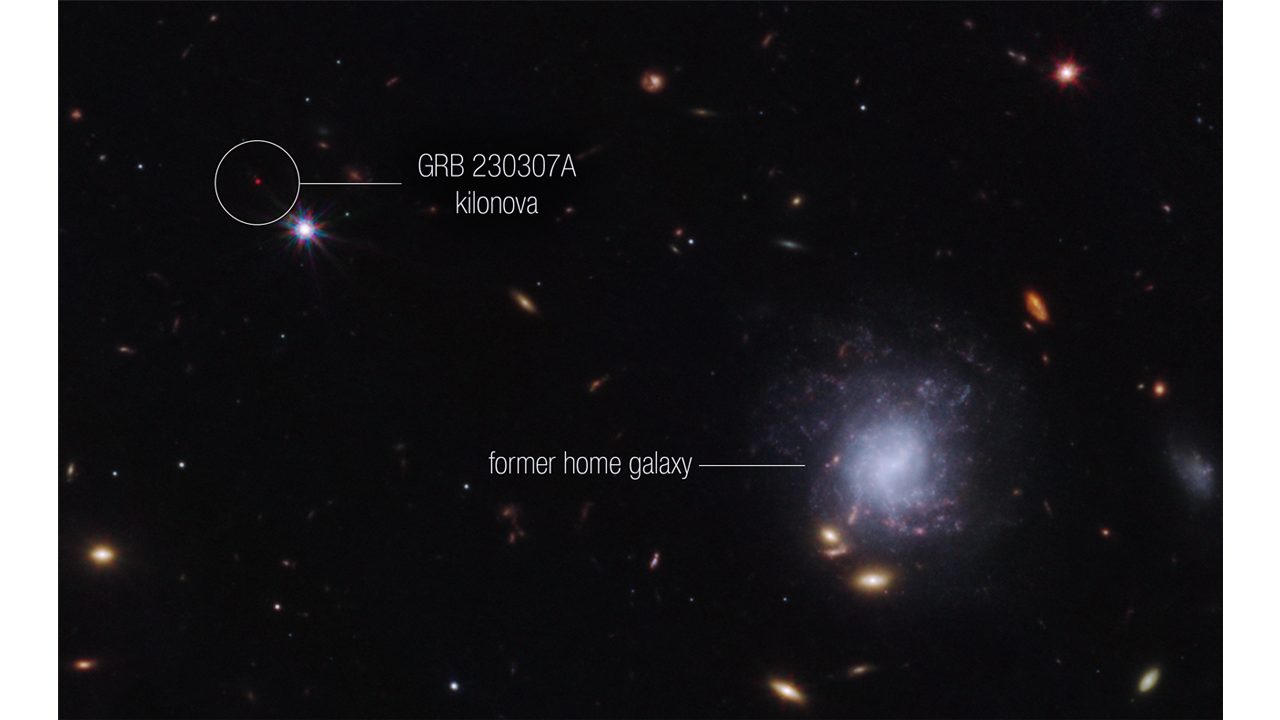
Near-infrared afterglow and host galaxy. Second brightest gamma-ray GRB 230307A burst photographed by Webb, for comparison.

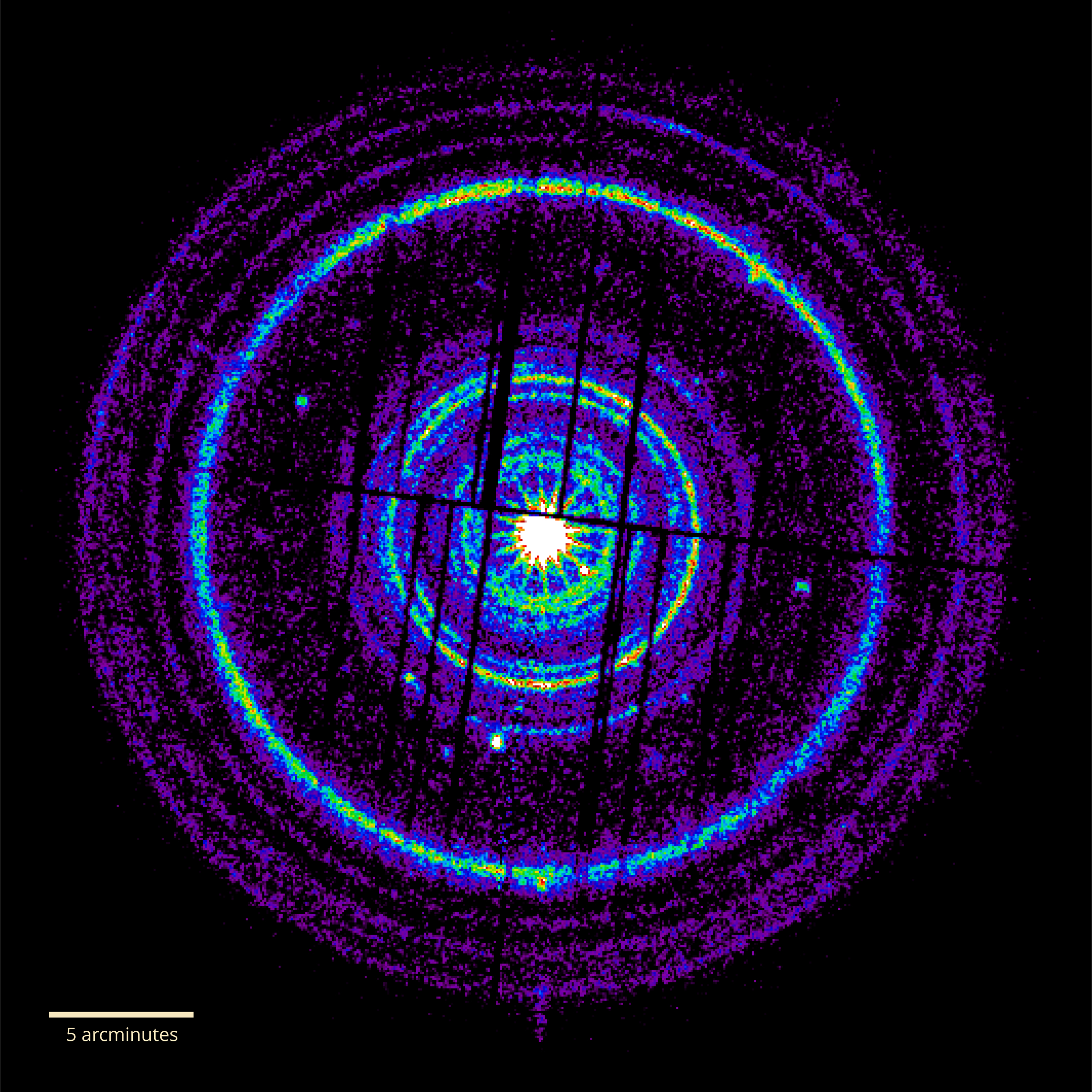
XMM-Newton images recorded 20 dust rings, 19 of which are shown here in arbitrary colors. This composite merges observations made two and five days after GRB 221009A erupted. Dark stripes indicate gaps between the detectors

== See also ==
- List of gamma-ray bursts
- Gamma-ray astronomy
- AT 2021lwx
- GRB 160625B
- GRB 130427A
- GRB 230307A, second-brightest gamma-ray burst by gamma-ray fluence with 3×10^{−4} erg cm^{−2}
- GRB 080916C, second most powerful gamma-ray burst with 8.8×10^{54} erg
