= AT 2021lwx =

Astronomical event

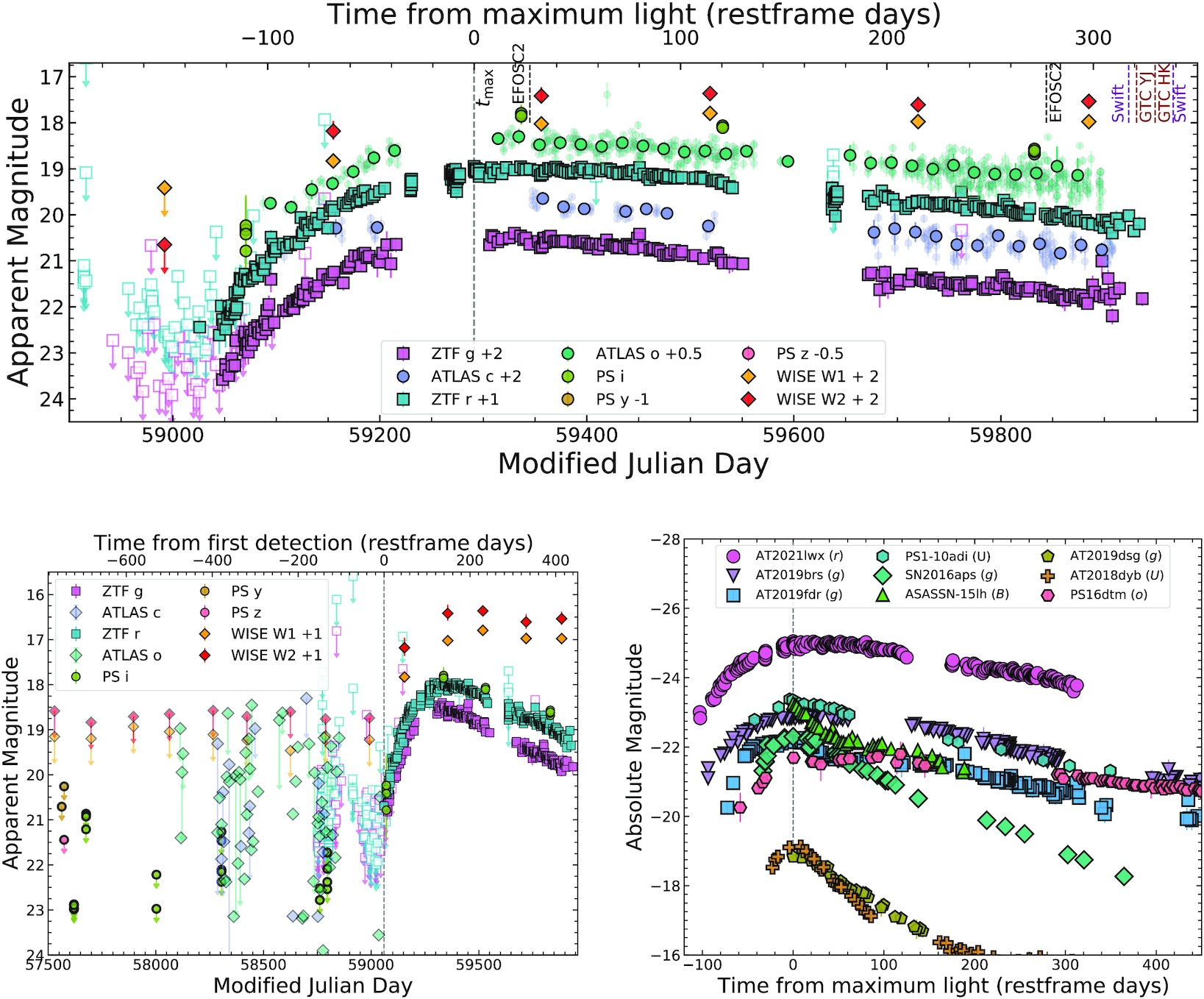
(Upper) Light curve of AT2021lwx. (Lower left) Pan-STARRS upper limits up to 750 d (rest frame) before the first detection of AT2021lwx. (Lower right) Comparison to similar transients.

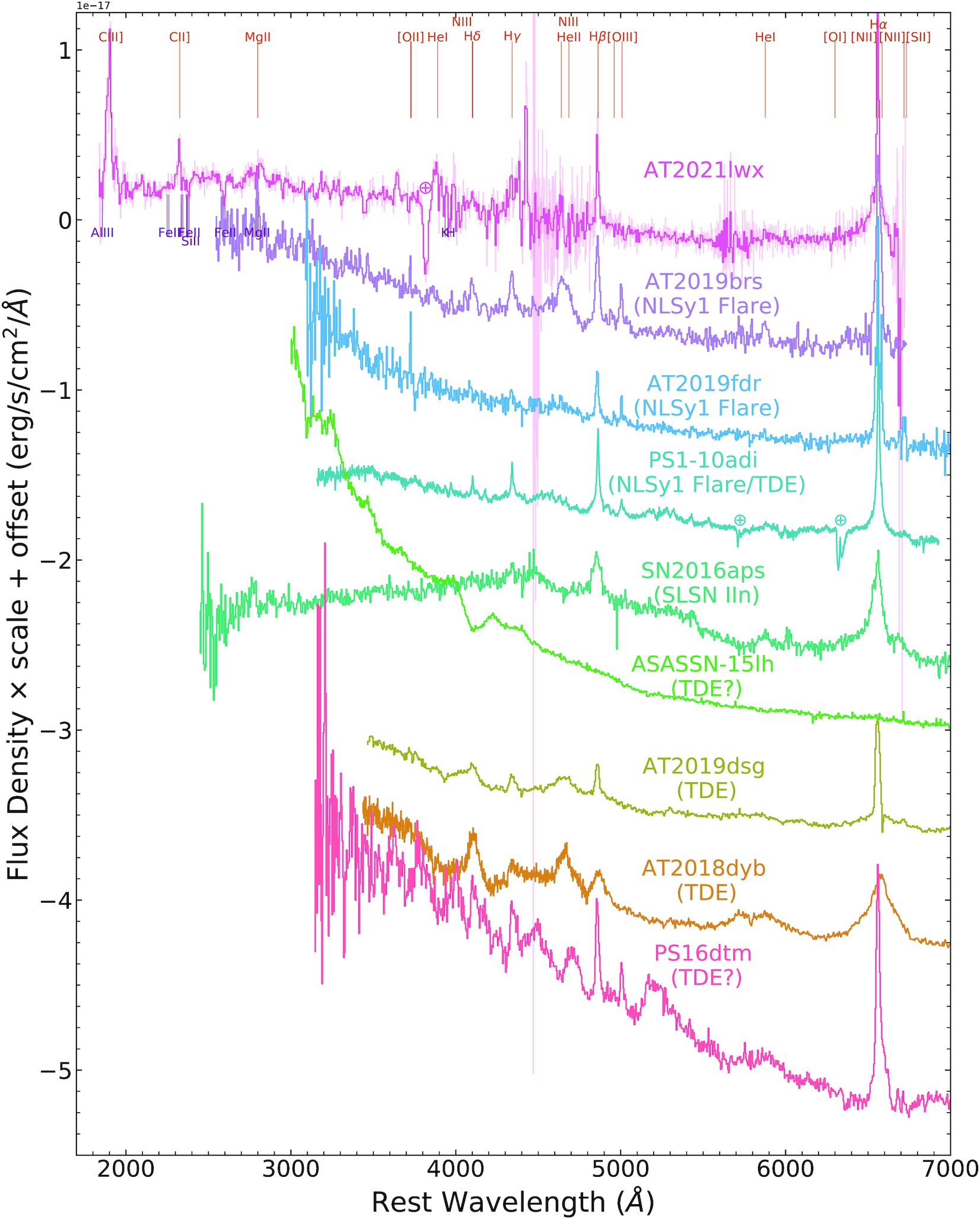
Rest-frame UV and optical spectra of AT2021lwx and similar objects.

AT 2021lwx (also known as ZTF20abrbeie or "Scary Barbie") is the most energetic non-quasar optical transient astronomical event ever observed, with a peak luminosity of 7.0×10^{38} W and a total radiated energy of 9.7×10^{45}–1.50×10^{46} J over three years. Despite being lauded as the largest explosion ever, GRB 221009A was both more energetic and brighter. It was first identified in imagery obtained on 13 April 2021 by the Zwicky Transient Facility (ZTF) astronomical survey and is believed to be due to the accretion of matter into a super massive black hole (SMBH) heavier than one hundred million solar masses (M_{☉}). It has a redshift of z = 0.9945, which would place it at a distance of about 7.7 to 8 billion light-years from earth, and is located in the constellation Vulpecula. No host galaxy has been detected.

Forced photometry of earlier ZTF imagery showed AT 2021lwx had already begun brightening by 16 June 2020, as ZTF20abrbeie. It was also detected independently in data from the Asteroid Terrestrial-impact Last Alert System (ATLAS) as ATLAS20bkdj, and the Panoramic Survey Telescope and Rapid Response System (Pan-STARRS) as PS22iin. At the Neil Gehrels Swift Observatory, X-ray observations were made with the X-ray Telescope and ultraviolet, with the Ultraviolet-Optical Telescope (UVOT).

The inferred mass of the SMBH, based on the light to mass ratio, is about 10^{8}–10^{9} M_{☉}, given the observed brightness. However, the theoretical limit for a black hole to tidally disrupt a solar-mass star is 10^{8} M_{☉}. If AT 2021lwx is a tidal disruption event, then the disrupted star must have been much more massive than the sun.

Subrayan et al. originally interpreted it to be a tidal disruption event between an SMBH (~10^{8} M_{☉}) and a massive star (~14 M_{☉}). Wiseman et al. reached a similar conclusion, but given the low probability of such an event, posited another scenario: "the sudden accretion of a large amount of gas, potentially a giant molecular cloud" (~10^{3} M_{☉}), onto an SMBH (>10^{8} M_{☉}).

== See also ==
- Ophiuchus Supercluster eruption, a 5.0×10^{54} J event that may have occurred up to 240 million years ago, revealed by a giant radio fossil
- MS 0735.6+7421, a 1.0×10^{54} J eruption that has been occurring for the last 100 million years
- GRB 080916C, an 8.8×10^{47} J gamma-ray burst seen in 2008
- GRB 221009A, a 1.2×10^{48} J gamma-ray burst seen in 2023
- Hypernova – Supernova that ejects a large mass at unusually high velocity
