= NeVe 1 =

Galaxy in the constellation Ophiuchus

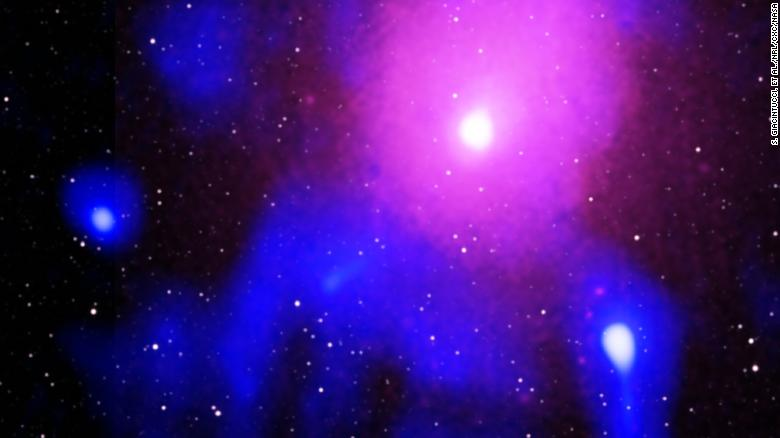
- Combined XMM-Newton and GMRT image of the Ophiuchus Cluster, with NeVe 1 being the bright, purple spot. The blue cloud on its lower left is the remnant of the eruption.

Observation data (J2000 epoch)
- Constellation: Ophiuchus
- Right ascension: 17^{h} 12^{m} 27.74^{s}
- Declination: −23° 22′ 10.8″
- Redshift: 0.02846
- Heliocentric radial velocity: 8530.9 km/s
- Distance: 411.2 Mly (126.08 Mpc) (comoving distance)
- Group or cluster: Ophiuchus Cluster
- Apparent magnitude (V): not visible

Characteristics
- Type: E, cD
- Size: ~331,800 ly (101.74 kpc) (estimated)
- Notable features: Host galaxy of the Ophiuchus Supercluster eruption

Other designations
- WISEA J171227.81-232210.7; 2MASX J17122774-2322108; PGC 59827; Ophiuchus Cluster BCG; Ophiuchus A

NeVe 1 is a supergiant elliptical galaxy, which is the central, dominant member and brightest cluster galaxy (BCG) of the Ophiuchus Cluster. It lies at a distance of about 411 million light-years away from Earth and is located behind the Zone of Avoidance region in the sky. It is the host galaxy of the Ophiuchus Supercluster eruption, the most energetic astronomical event known.

== Observation history ==
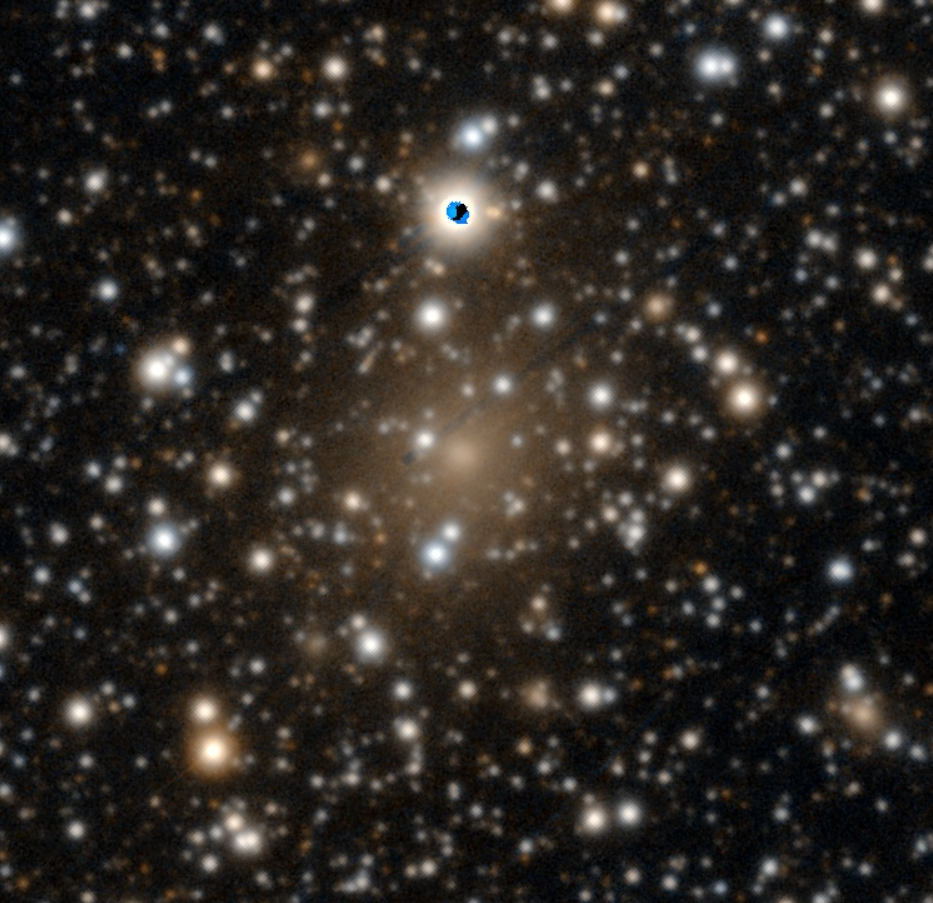
The Ophiuchus Cluster as imaged by Pan-STARRS DR1, showing the giant galaxy NeVe 1 and its fuzzy halo partially obscured by the dense foreground stars of the Milky Way

Despite being in the relatively nearby, large Ophiuchus Cluster, due to its location behind the Milky Way galactic disc relative to the Earth's perspective (known as the Zone of Avoidance), the majority of the cluster including NeVe 1 are heavily obscured and invisible to the naked eye, such that it can only be observed in wavelengths beyond the visible spectrum, such as X-rays and infrared.

When first observed in 1985 it was initially thought to be a planetary nebula within the large, star-forming Rho Ophiuchi cloud complex. In a catalogue published by the German astronomers Thorsten Neckel and Hans Vehrenberg using data retrieved from the Palomar Observatory Sky Survey, the object was then assigned as the first entry of their Atlas of Galactic Planetary Nebulae (NeVe, from their surnames Neckel and Vehrenberg). The "planetary nebula" was then further incorporated in the Strasbourg-ESO Catalogue of Galactic Planetary Nebulae in 1991.

In a subsequent survey using six films from the ESO/SERC Sky Survey Atlas, at least 4,100 galaxies including NeVe 1 were identified. This was further attested by the detection of luminous X-ray and radio emission in the object that is indicative of an active galactic nucleus, leading to its identification as not a nearby planetary nebula from a dying star, but a full-fledged giant galaxy lying beyond the Milky Way.

== Characteristics ==
NeVe 1's location in the sky behind the plane of the Milky Way makes it very difficult to study in the optical wavelengths. Using near-infrared and X-ray measurements it is shown to be a large elliptical galaxy—probably one of the largest such galaxies near the Milky Way, with the diameter twice that of Messier 87. Observations using the Chandra X-ray Observatory in 2010 revealed that NeVe 1 sits at the center of a comet-like structure of its host cluster, indicative of ram-pressure stripping and the merger of at least two smaller subclusters. This enormous structure may have slowed down the velocity of NeVe 1 via the interaction of its stars and dark matter. The head of the structure sits about 4 kiloparsecs (13,000 light-years) from NeVe 1 and the galaxy itself is classified as a cooling core with high X-ray emission in contrast to the hot, intracluster medium of the Ophiuchus Cluster.

== Eruption ==
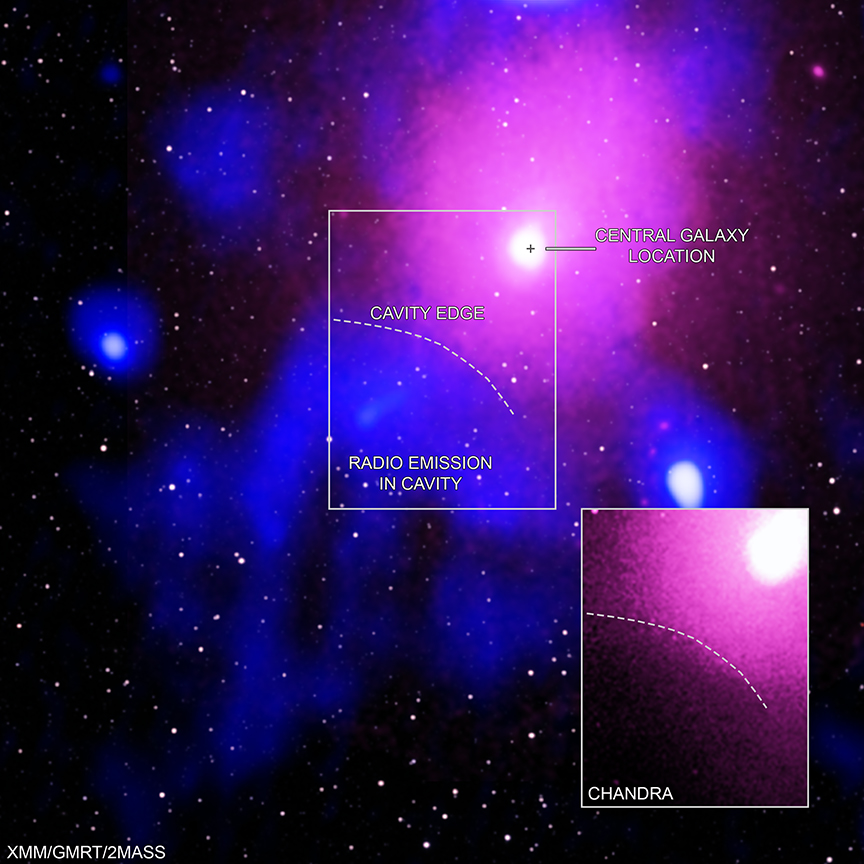
The Ophiuchus Cluster with labels included. The central galaxy NeVe 1 is marked by the cross (+), while the dashed line shows the break in its X-ray halo—the boundary of the cavity and its associated radio emission. The image on the lower right by Chandra further details the cavity edge in NeVe 1's X-ray halo. Credit: Chandra, 2MASS, XMM-Newton, GMRT.

In a paper published in 2020, NeVe 1 and its surrounding region has been identified as an extreme example of a giant radio fossil—with structures indicative of much more violent active galactic nucleus (AGN) activity in the past. In the case of NeVe 1 there is a striking concave arc terminating the bubble of the X-ray halo surrounding the galaxy, with smaller mini-lobes that may be a result of further, smaller activity of its AGN. This concave arc is part of an enormous cavity, a void region of the intracluster medium with the diameter of at least 460 kiloparsecs (1.5×10^{6} ly) that corresponds to an extensive, radio-emitting structure extending throughout the cluster.

The creation of such an enormous cavity could be explained by an extraordinarily large AGN outburst from NeVe 1. Assuming that the cavity and the galaxy are roughly in the same radial orientation relative to Earth, the energy required to create the cavity (factoring in the density of the intracluster medium of the Ophiuchus Cluster that resist and must be displaced by the expansion) would be on the order of 5×10^{54} J of energy. This violent outburst, likely to have happened no less than 240 million years before, is the Ophiuchus Supercluster eruption—the most energetic astronomical event known. It was five times more energetic than the outburst at the galaxy cluster MS 0735.6+7421, and 4.2 million times more energetic than GRB 221009A—the most energetic gamma-ray burst known. It was a high-energy low-power event, occurring over millions of years.

The outburst has been attested to have been generated by NeVe 1's central supermassive black hole, which may have consumed an equivalent of 270 million solar masses of material—possibly from a cannibalized dwarf galaxy—that generated shock waves and relativistic jets of high-energy particles that displaced the intracluster medium to form the cavity. The eruption occurred slowly over millions of years and released as much energy equivalent to thousands of gamma-ray bursts per year. A later 2020 study by the NanoGRAV survey estimates the central black hole of NeVe 1 having a mass of 7×10^{9} M_{☉} (best fit; the range is between 2.5–19×10^{9} M_{☉}).

The question remains as to how the still extant cool core of NeVe 1 would have survived such a cataclysmic activity, which would have completely destroyed the core. It has been suggested that the eruption may be the result of some form of large-scale hydrodynamic activity within the intracluster medium, allowing it to distribute the energy by a Kelvin–Helmholtz instability eddy allowing the core to survive. Such structures have been found in the similar Perseus Cluster and its galaxy NGC 1275.

This observation is a result of collaboration among various space-based and Earth-based observatories including the Hubble Space Telescope, the Chandra X-ray Observatory, ESA’s XMM Newton X-ray space observatory and radio data from the Murchison Widefield Array (MWA) in Australia and the Giant Metrewave Radio Telescope (GMRT) in India.

== See also ==
- MS 0735.6+7421—galaxy cluster whose eruption was the previously known most energetic astronomical event
- NGC 1275
- Messier 87
- AT 2021lwx
- Orders of magnitude (energy)
