= MS 0735.6+7421 =

Galaxy cluster in the constellation Camelopardalis

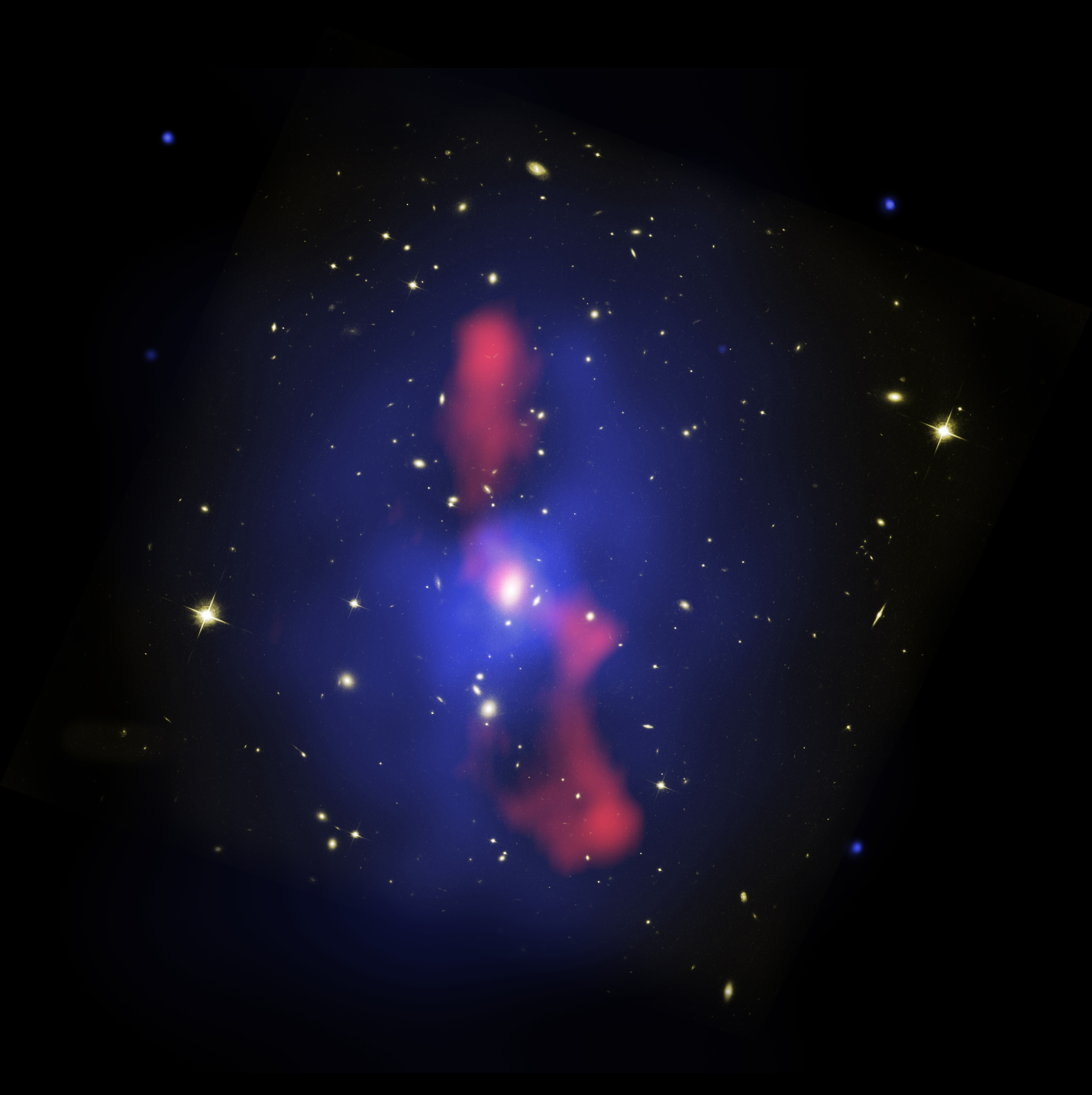
- A composite image from Hubble and Chandra

Observation data (Epoch J2000)
- Right ascension: 07^{h} 41^{m} 50.2^{s}
- Declination: +74° 14′ 51″
- Redshift: 64,800 ± 900 km/s
- Distance: 2.6 billion light-years

Other designations
- ZwCl 0735.7+7421

MS 0735.6+7421 is a galaxy cluster located in the constellation Camelopardalis, approximately 2.6 billion light-years away. It is notable as the location of one of the largest central galactic black holes in the known universe, which has also apparently produced one of the most powerful active galactic nucleus eruptions discovered.

In February 2020, it was reported that another similar but much more energetic AGN outburst—the Ophiuchus Supercluster eruption in the NeVe 1 galaxy, was five times the energy of MS 0735.6+7421.

== Black hole eruption ==
Using data from the Chandra X-ray Observatory, scientists have deduced that an eruption has been occurring for the last 100 million years at the heart of the galaxy cluster, releasing as much energy over this time as hundreds of millions of gamma ray bursts. (The amount of energy released in a year is thus equivalent to several GRBs.) The remnants of the eruption are seen as two cavities on either side of a large central galaxy. If this outburst, with a total energy budget of more than 10^{55} J, was caused by a black hole accretion event, it must have consumed nearly 600 million solar masses.

Work done by Brian McNamara et al. (2008) point out the striking possibility that the outburst was not the result of an accretion event, but was instead powered by the rotation of the black hole. Moreover, the scientists mentioned the possibility that the central black hole in MS 0735.6+7421 could be one of the biggest black holes inhabiting the visible universe. This speculation is supported by the fact that the central cD Galaxy inside MS 0735.6+7421 possess the largest break radius known, as of today. With a calculated light deficit of more than 20 billion solar luminosities and an assumed light-to-mass ratio of 3, this yields a central black hole mass much above 10 billion solar masses, as far as the break radius was caused by the merger of several black holes in the past. In combination with the gargantuan energy outburst it is therefore very likely that MS 0735.6+7421 hosts a supermassive black hole in its core. The cluster has a red shift of 64,800 ± 900 km/s and an apparent size of 25′.

Newer calculations using the spheroidal luminosity of the central galaxy and the estimation of its break radius yielded black hole masses of 15.8 ^{+26.8}_{−9.9} billion M_{☉} (10^{10.20 ± 0.43}) and 51.3 ^{+96.6}_{−33.5} billion M_{☉} (10^{10.71 ± 0.46}) (with the range being 17.8 billion M_{☉} to 147.9 billion M_{☉}), respectively.

== Brightest cluster galaxy ==
4C +74.13

Observation data (J2000.0 epoch)
- Right ascension: 07^{h} 41^{m} 44.47^{s}
- Declination: +74° 14′ 39.5″
- Redshift: 0.216000
- Heliocentric radial velocity: 64,755 km/s
- Distance: 2.599 Billion Light Years (796.85 Mpc)

Characteristics
- Type: cD

Other designations
- 2MASX J07414444+7414395, LEDA 2760958, 8C 0735+743, MS 0735.6+7421 BCG

The brightest cluster galaxy in MS 0735.6+7421 is the elliptical galaxy, 4C +74.13. Known as LEDA 2760958, it is classified as a radio galaxy. With a diameter of around 400 kpc, the galaxy shows a steep spectrum radio source. The core of the 4C +74.13 has a spectrum index of α^{1400}_{325} = –1.54, with its outer radio lobes found to measure α^{1400}_{325} < –3.1. According to studies, it is evident that the core activity has recently restarted in a form of two inner lobes. It is also known to have ongoing star formation. With its stellar core estimating to be 3.8 kiloparsecs across, it is indicated 4C +74.13 might well contain an ultramassive black hole in its center.

== X-ray source ==
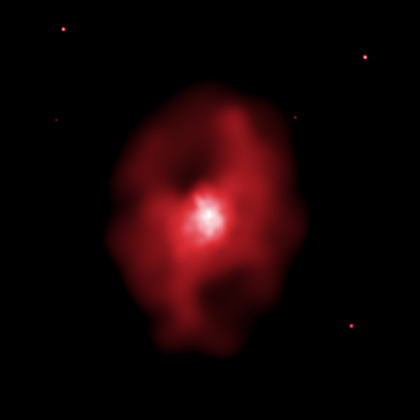
Chandra image of the hot X-ray emitting gas that pervades the galaxy cluster MS 0735.6+7421 in the constellation Camelopardalis. Two vast cavities - each 600,000 lyrs in diameter appear on opposite sides of a large galaxy at the center of the cluster. These cavities are filled with a two-sided, elongated, magnetized bubble of extremely high-energy electrons that emit radio waves. Image is 4.2 arcmin per side. RA 07^{h} 41^{m} 50.20^{s} Dec +74° 14' 51.00". Observation date: November 30, 2003. Credit: NASA/CXC/Ohio U./B.McNamara.

Hot X-ray emitting gas pervades MS 0735.6+7421. Two vast cavities—each 600,000 ly in diameter—appear on opposite sides of a large galaxy at the center of the cluster. These cavities are filled with a two-sided, elongated, magnetized bubble of extremely high-energy electrons that emit radio waves.

== See also ==
- X-ray astronomy
- Astrophysical X-ray source
- AT 2021lwx
