= V339 Delphini =

2013 nova seen in the constellation Delphinus

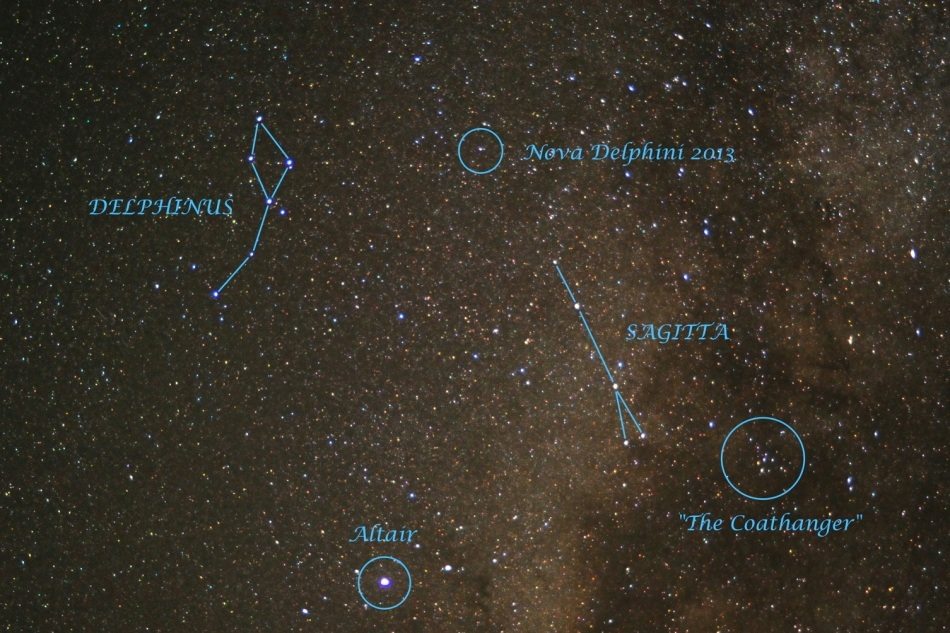
- Nova Delphini 2013 (marked)

Observation data Epoch J2000 Equinox ICRS
- Constellation: Delphinus
- Right ascension: 20^{h} 23^{m} 30.6865^{s}
- Declination: +20° 46′ 03.777″
- Apparent magnitude (V): 4.5 Max. 17.5 Min.

Characteristics
- Variable type: Nova

Astrometry
Proper motion (μ)	RA: −4.140±0.534 mas/yr Dec.: −8.609±0.513 mas/yr
Parallax (π)	0.3814±0.3615 mas
Distance	2130+2250 −400 pc

Other designations
- Nova Del 2013, PNV J20233073+2046041, Gaia DR2 1817026669528976768

Database references
SIMBAD	data

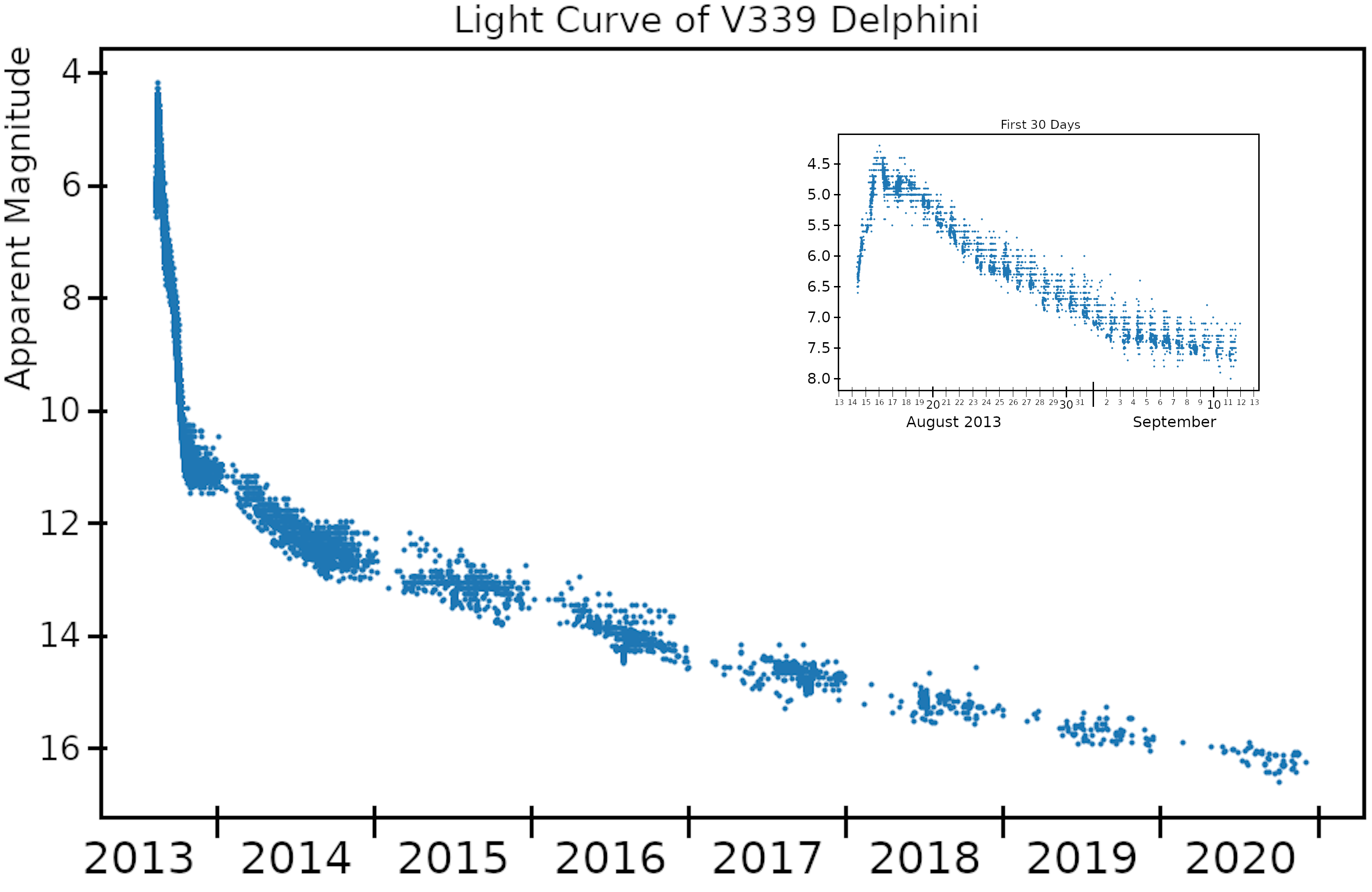
The light curve of V339 Delphini from AAVSO data

V339 Delphini or Nova Delphini 2013 (PNV J20233073+2046041) is a bright nova star in the constellation Delphinus. It was discovered on 14 August 2013 by amateur astronomer Kōichi Itagaki in Japan and confirmed by the Liverpool Telescope on La Palma. The nova appeared with a magnitude 6.8 when it was discovered and peaked at magnitude 4.3 on 16 August 2013. A nova is produced by the fusion of accumulated material on the white dwarf nova progenitor acquired from its companion star. The nova system is thus a binary star, and a classical nova. The white dwarf is a carbon-oxygen white dwarf, with an estimated mass of 1.04±0.02 M_{☉}. There is not yet a consensus about what the binary's orbital period is; estimates range from 3.15 hours to 6.43 hours.

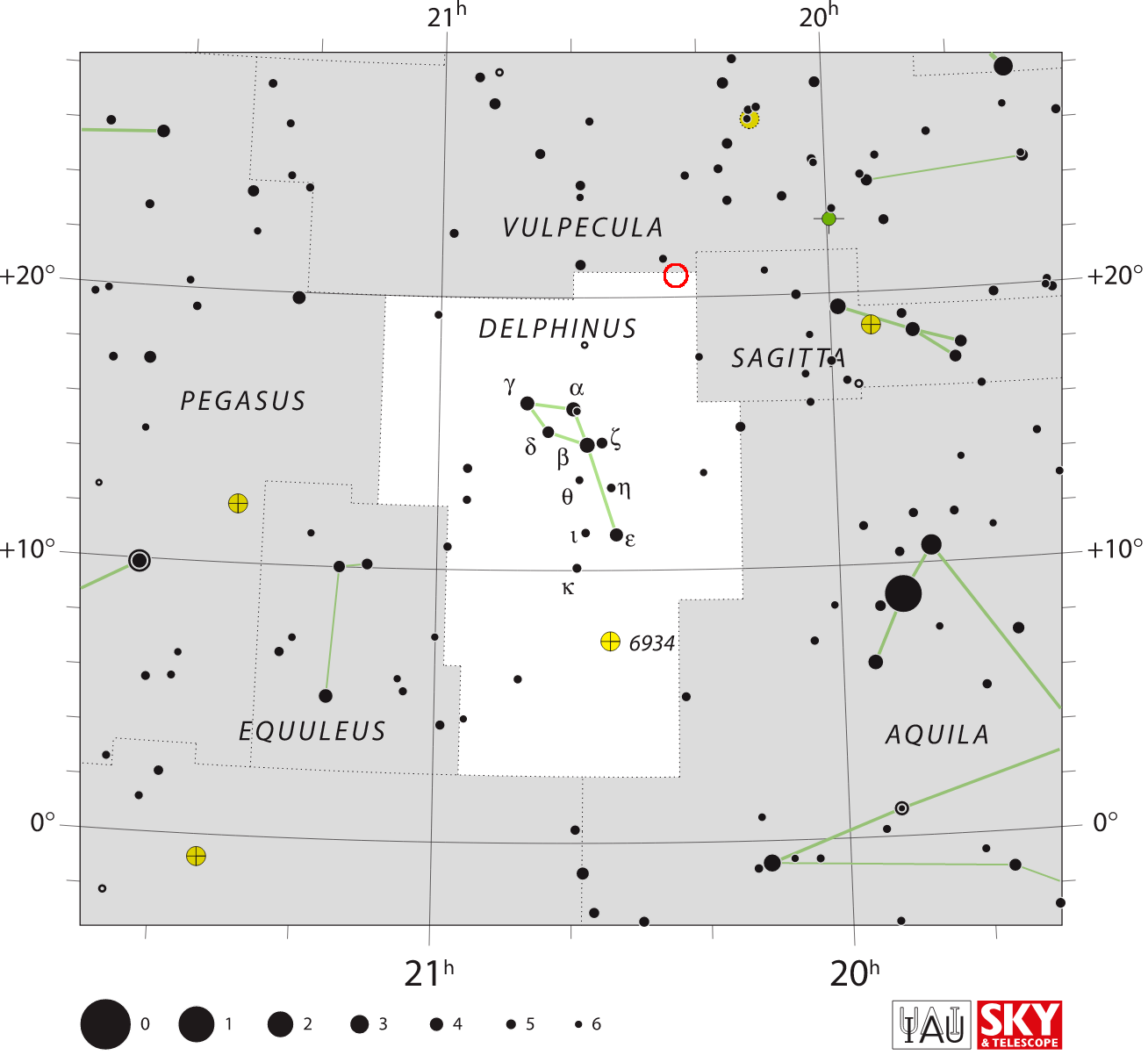
The location of V339 Delphini (circled in red)

V339 Del is the first nova that has been observed to synthesize the element lithium. Production of lithium-7 from the decay of beryllium-7, which was observed in the wind blown out of the nova. This is the first direct evidence of the supply of lithium to the interstellar medium by an astronomical object. Lithium-7 is fragile in the environment at the center of a nova, so being blown out of the environment at the center is necessary for the observation of lithium. The beryllium was produced by the fusion of helium-3 with helium-4. Nucleosynthesis of lithium is important in the study of chemical abundances in the universe.

== See also ==
- List of novae in the Milky Way galaxy
- Nova Centauri 2013
