= Olivier Chesneau =

French astronomer (1972–2014)

Olivier Chesneau (1972 in Mozé-sur-Louet – May 17, 2014 in Nice) was a French astronomer.

He contributed to a better understanding of several aspects of evolved stars physics, especially planetary nebulae, massive stars and novae.

Among other discoveries, Olivier Chesneau discovered the "peanut star" HR 5171, the fact that novae explode with an hourglass shape already a few days after outburst (e.g. RS Ophiuchi), or the detection of disks in the heart of planetary nebulae.

The Laboratoire J Lagrange at the Côte d'Azur Observatory in France, and ESO established a prize in his memory, The Chesneau Prize.

Minor planet 6065 Chesneau is named in his honor.
