= KT Eridani =

Star in the constellation Eridanus

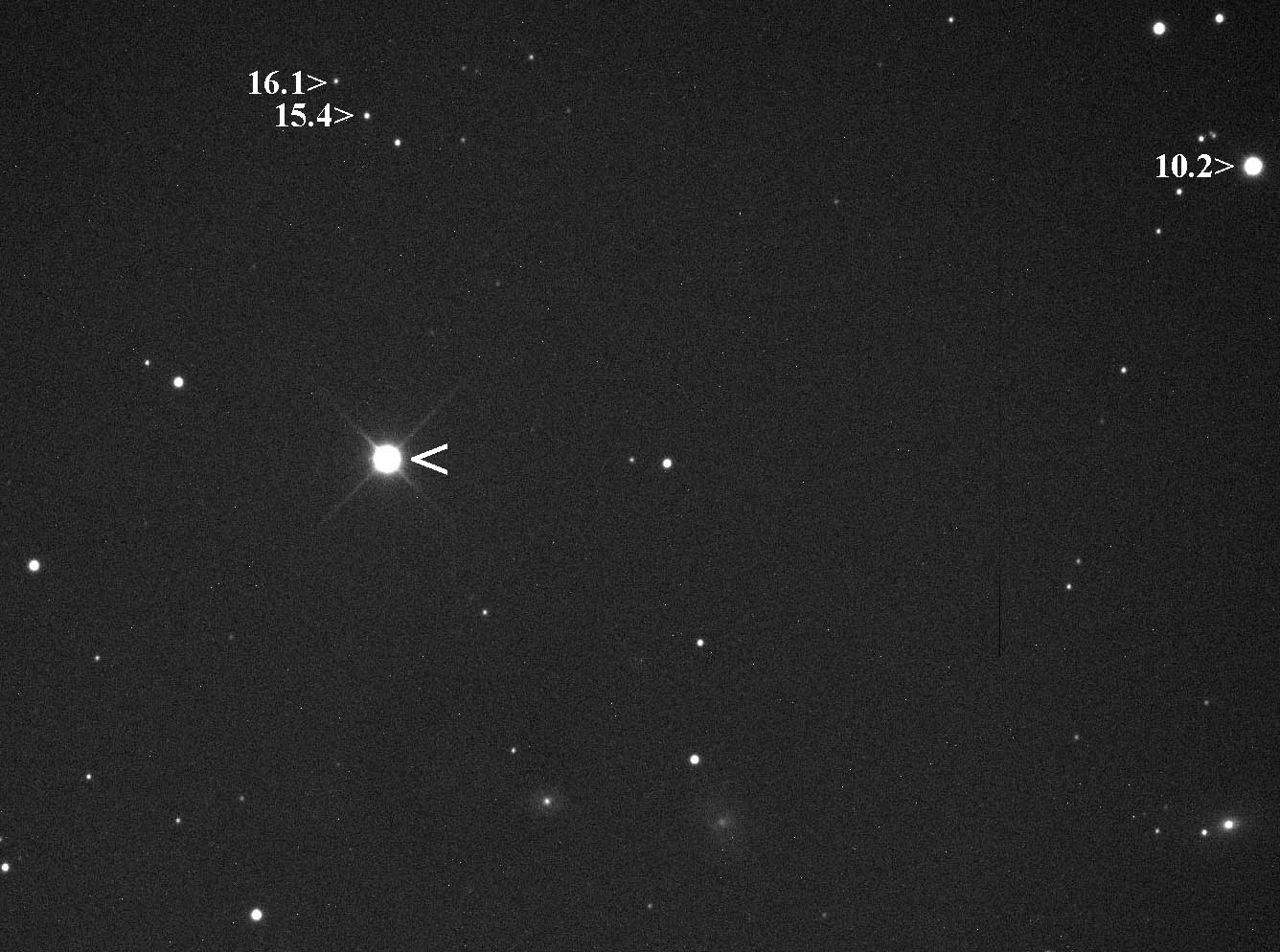
- KT Eridani on 2009 November 30 during a full moon

Observation data Epoch J2000.0 Equinox ICRS
- Constellation: Eridanus
- Right ascension: 04^{h} 47^{m} 54.2015^{s}
- Declination: −10° 10′ 42.963″
- Apparent magnitude (V): 5.4 Max. 15.0 Min.

Characteristics
- Variable type: Classical Nova

Astrometry
Proper motion (μ)	RA: 6.469±0.053 mas/yr Dec.: −11.009±0.052 mas/yr
Parallax (π)	0.2044±0.0384 mas
Distance	3744+591 −328 pc

Details

White dwarf
Mass	1.15-1.25 M_{☉}

Other designations
- Nova Eridani 2009, Gaia DR2 3184664584368981760

Database references
SIMBAD	data

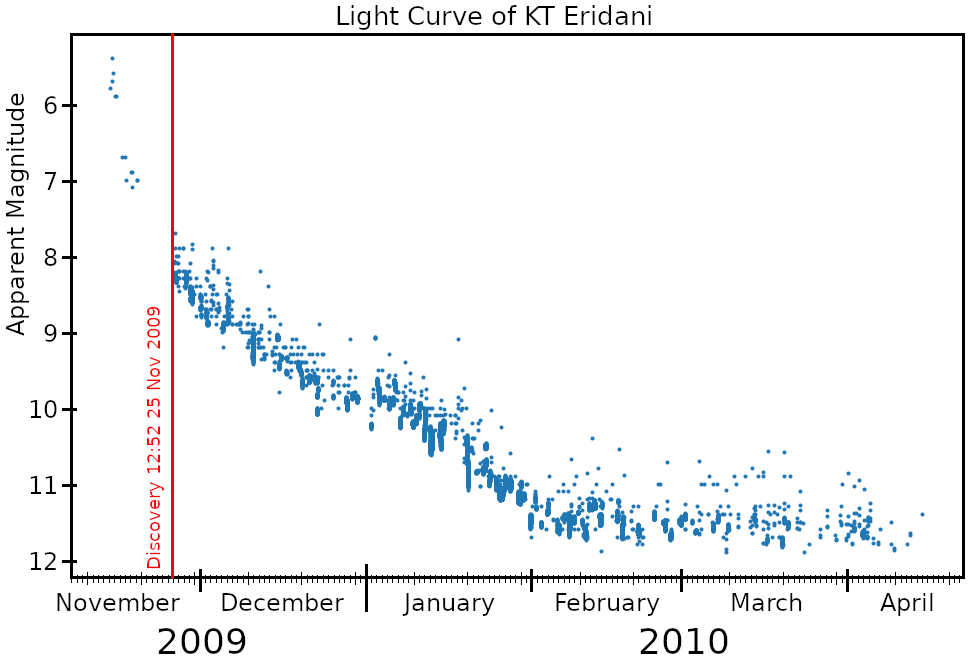
The light curve of KT Eridani from AAVSO data and Raj et al. The red line indicated the date of discovery.

KT Eridani (Nova Eridani 2009) was a bright nova in the constellation Eridanus that produced an outburst in 2009. It was the first classical nova ever detected in that constellation. The nova was discovered at 12:52 UT on 25 November 2009 by K. Itagaki at Yamagata, Japan with a 21 cm patrol telescope. At the time of its discovery, it was a magnitude 8.1 object. The discovery occurred after the nova's peak brightness, but the All Sky Automated Survey system had detected the nova on three earlier occasions, allowing a more complete light curve to be produced. The peak magnitude, 5.4, was seen at 15:10 UT on 14 November 2009, at which time it would have been visible to the naked eye.

A very high temporal resolution light curve, beginning on 13 November 2009, was obtained from images taken by the Solar Mass Ejection Imager on the Coriolis satellite. These observations show that the peak brightness, magnitude 5.42±0.02, occurred at November 14.67±0.04 UT. The satellite was able to detect the nova until November 27.23±0.04, by which time it had dropped to magnitude 8.3±0.1. It is classified as a very fast nova, meaning it dimmed rapidly after peak brightness.

On 28 December 2009 (44 days after peak brightness) it was detected as a 0.21 milliJansky source at 5 GHz by the Very Large Array. In the following weeks its radio brightness increased and it was detected in additional radio bands. On the other end of the electromagnetic spectrum, the Swift satellite was used to look for X-ray emission from KT Eridani starting on 27 November 2009, and the satellite detected it on 24 December 2009.

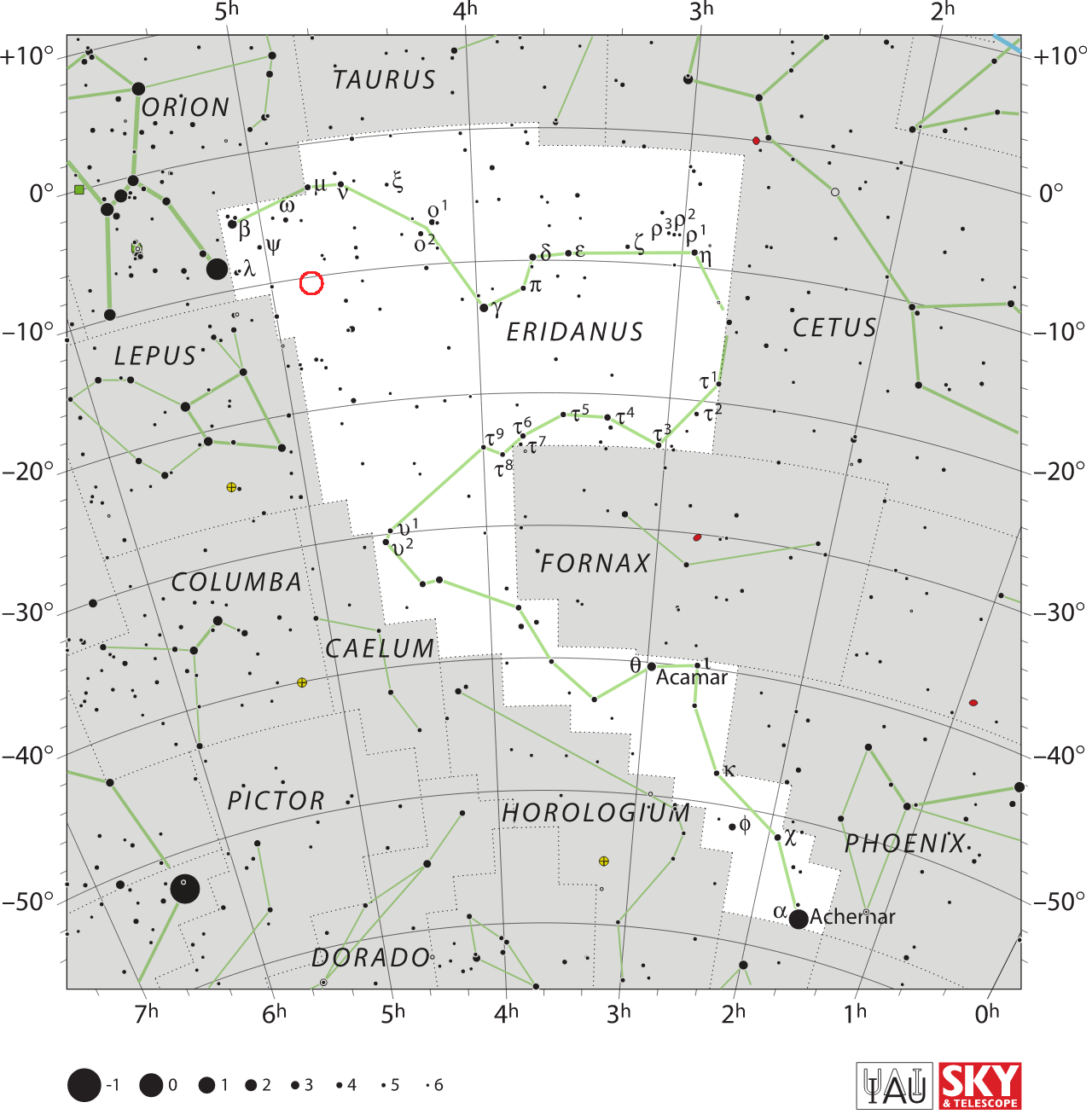
The location of KT Eridani (circled in red)

In the most common nova systems, the white dwarf accretes matter from a main sequence star. The white dwarf in the KT Eridani system has a mass of between 1.15 and 1.25 M_{☉}. KT Eridani is probably a recurrent nova, although no previous eruption has been observed. It has an orbital period of 𝑃=2.615950±0.00060 days. The companion is probably a subgiant, with a temperature around 6200 K.

A new rise in brightness was detected in March/April 2025. On March 23 the star reached a brightness of V=13.985 mag during a continued steep rise. Observations with Swift in the ultraviolet shows a continued brightening from w2 = 13.05 ±0.02 mag on April 6th to 12.75 ±0.03 mag on April 10th. KT Eri will however enter the solar observing constrain on April 22nd.

== See also ==
- List of novae in the Milky Way galaxy
