= RS Ophiuchi =

Recurrent nova in the constellation Ophiuchus

- Location of RS Ophiuchi (circled)

Observation data Epoch J2000.0 Equinox ICRS
- Constellation: Ophiuchus
- Right ascension: 17^{h} 50^{m} 13.2^{s}
- Declination: −06° 42′ 28″
- Apparent magnitude (V): 9.6 – 13.5 (quiet), < 5 (burst)

Characteristics
- Spectral type: K5.5/M0IIIe
- Variable type: Recurrent nova

Astrometry
Distance	3,900 – 6,500 ly (1,200 – 2,000 pc)

Other designations
- HD 162214, BD−06°4661

Database references
SIMBAD	data

RS Ophiuchi (RS Oph) is a recurrent nova system approximately 5,000 light-years away in the constellation Ophiuchus. In its quiet phase it has an apparent magnitude of about 12.5. It has been observed to erupt in 1898, 1933, 1958, 1967, 1985, 2006 and 2021 and reached about magnitude 5 on average. A further two eruptions, in 1907 and 1945, have been inferred from archival data. The recurrent nova is produced by a white dwarf star and a red giant in a binary system. About every 15 years, enough material from the red giant builds up on the surface of the white dwarf to produce a thermonuclear explosion. The white dwarf orbits close to the red giant, with an accretion disc concentrating the overflowing atmosphere of the red giant onto the white dwarf.

The nova is surrounded by a 70 parsecs (230 light-years) nova super-remnant (not to be confused with supernova remnant). The nova remnant has an estimated mass between 20 and 200 M_{☉} and an age between 50 and 100,000 years. Such remants may be common among all reccurent novae, but due to their faint brightness, very few have been discovered.

== Properties ==
RS Ophiuchi is a system consisting of a white dwarf with a red giant companion. The stars are in a binary system with an orbital period of around 454 days.

== Eruptive history ==
The chart below shows when every recorded nova had occurred since the first confirmed one in the year of 1898.

Date of eruption	Years since last eruption
1898	–
1907	9
1933	26
1945	12
1958	13
1967	9
1985	18
2006	21
2021	15

=== 1898 ===
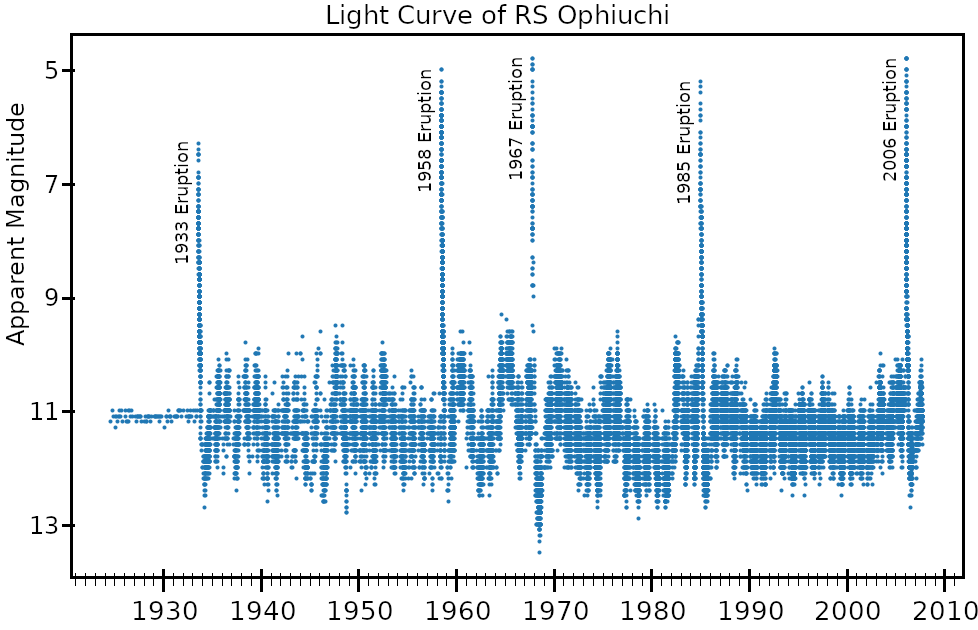
The light curve of RS Ophiuchi, showing five eruptions. Plotted from AAVSO visible-band data.

The 1898 eruption was, in fact, not discovered until several years after it happened. Williamina Fleming discovered a nova-like spectrum in the Henry Draper Memorial photographs and announced it as a potential nova in 1904. This diagnosis was affirmed by Edward Charles Pickering in 1905, after which Annie Jump Cannon determined that RS Ophiuchi had likely reached maximum in 1898.

=== 1907 ===
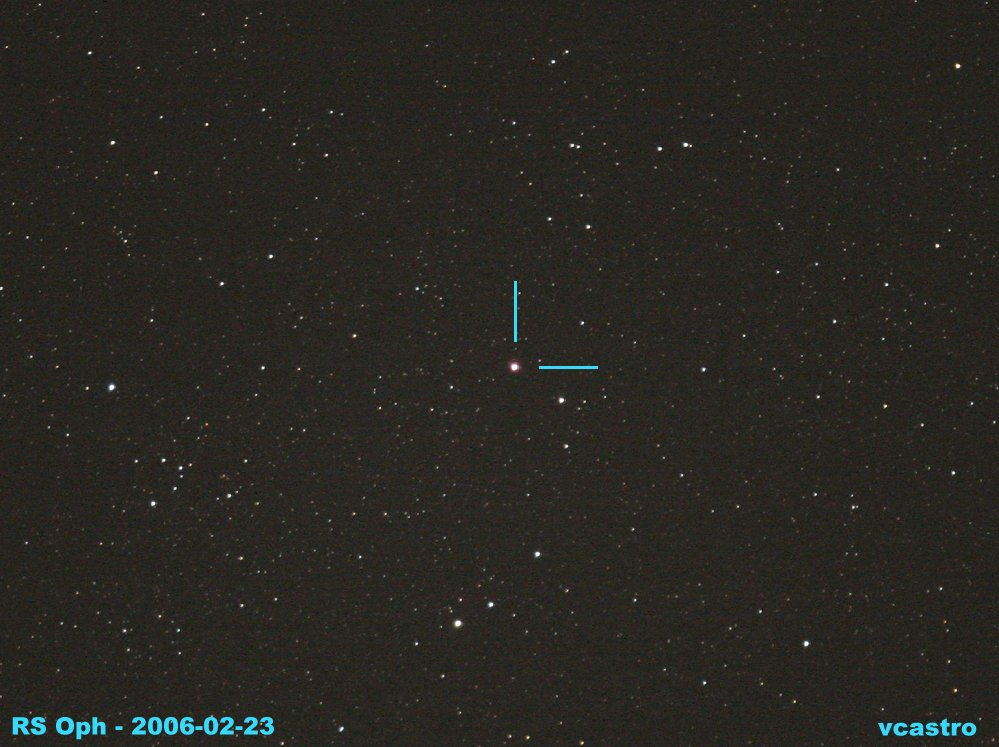
Recurrent nova RS Ophiuchi in eruption of February 2006

Though the 1907 eruption was not observed during outburst, measurements of a dip in brightness from archival observations suggests that RS Oph underwent an eruption in early 1907 during a time when it was obscured by the sun.

=== 1933 ===
The 1933 outburst was first detected by Eppe Loreta, from Bologna, Italy. Loreta had been observing Y Ophiuchi when he serendipitously noticed a bright object about 50 arcminutes southwest of Y Oph. The detection of this luminous star resulted in the second recorded outburst of RS Oph. An independent discovery of this activity was made several days later by Leslie Peltier (P) while making his routine check of the variable.

=== 1945 ===
The 1945 eruption was also inferred from archival data after the outburst as a result of obscuration from the sun during the peak brightness. This eruption is more certain than that in 1907, as the tail of the eruption was also observed.

=== 1958 ===
The 1958 outburst was detected by Cyrus Fernald, located in Longwood, Florida. Fernald's monthly report for July 1958, containing 345 observations, displays a note in which he comments "Not too good of a month outside of the RS Oph observations (19 in total). It was interesting to watch the change in color as the star faded. It was reddish-yellow the first night, then yellowish-red, and so on. The last observation was the reddest star that I have ever seen." The crimson color of which Fernald speaks is indicative of the strong H-alpha emission displayed in the several days following the outburst.

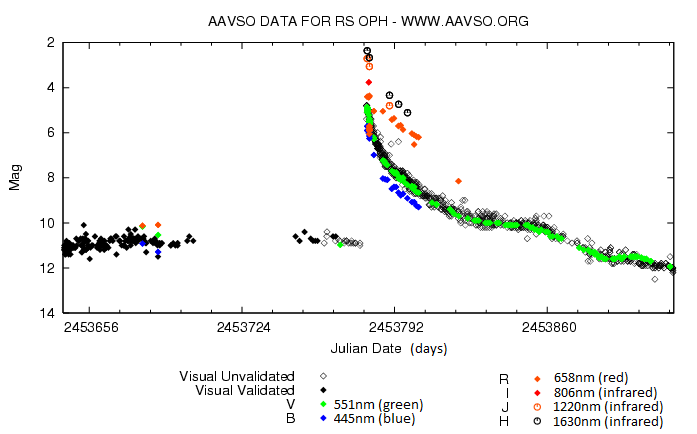
AAVSO light curve of RS Oph's 2006 outburst. Different colors reflect different bandpasses.

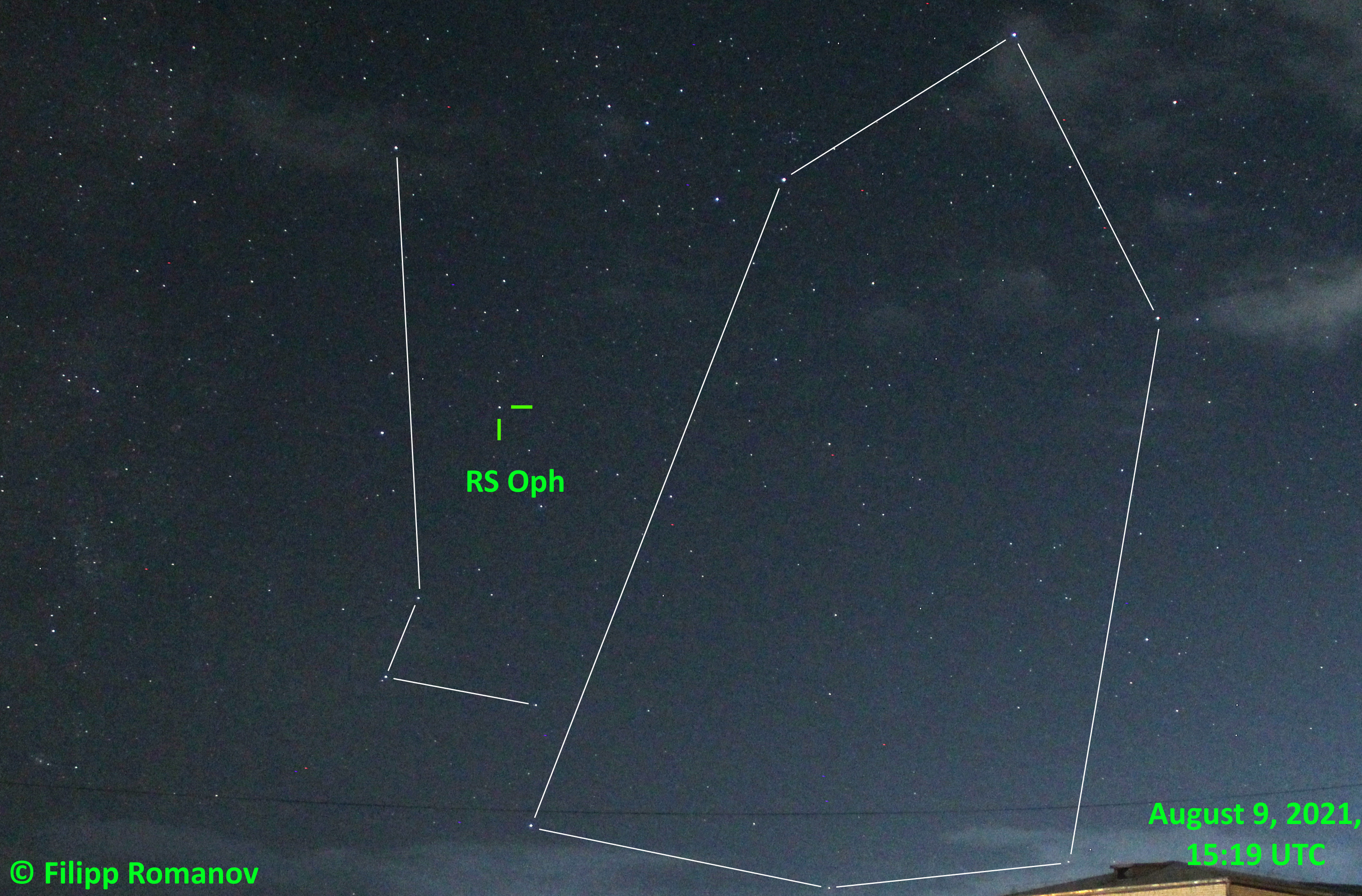
Image of RS Oph in 2021 outburst from Nakhodka

=== 1967 ===
The 1967 outburst was again detected by Cyrus Fernald (FE), however, Fernald was not given credit for the earliest observation of maximum. For on the same evening, Dr. Max Beyer (BY), located in Hamburg, Germany, observed the variable at 6th magnitude. Due to the 6-hour difference in time zones, Dr. Beyer was credited with the first report.

=== 1985 ===
In January 1985, Warren Morrison of Peterborough, Canada discovered RS Oph to again be in outburst, reaching a maximum brightness of magnitude 5.4.

=== 2006 ===
On 12 February 2006 a new outburst occurred, reaching magnitude 4.5. The opportunity was taken to observe it at different wavelengths. It was notably observed with the VLTI by Olivier Chesneau, who discovered an elongated fireball as early as 5.5 days after the explosion (see the figure below). Silicate dust and SiO emissions were observed after eruptuon.

=== 2021 ===
On 8 August 2021, the Brazilian amateur astronomer Alexandre Amorim, from Florianópolis, Brazil detected a new outburst of RS Oph at 21:55 UT and sent a notification to AAVSO. The outburst was confirmed by an independent observation of Keith Geary from Ireland at 22:20 UT. The Fermi Gamma Ray Space Telescope corroborated optical observations made by Amorim and Geary of a new outburst associated with RS Oph, with an estimated visual magnitude of 5.0. It reached a peak visual magnitude of approximately 4.6 the following day.

== Bibliography ==
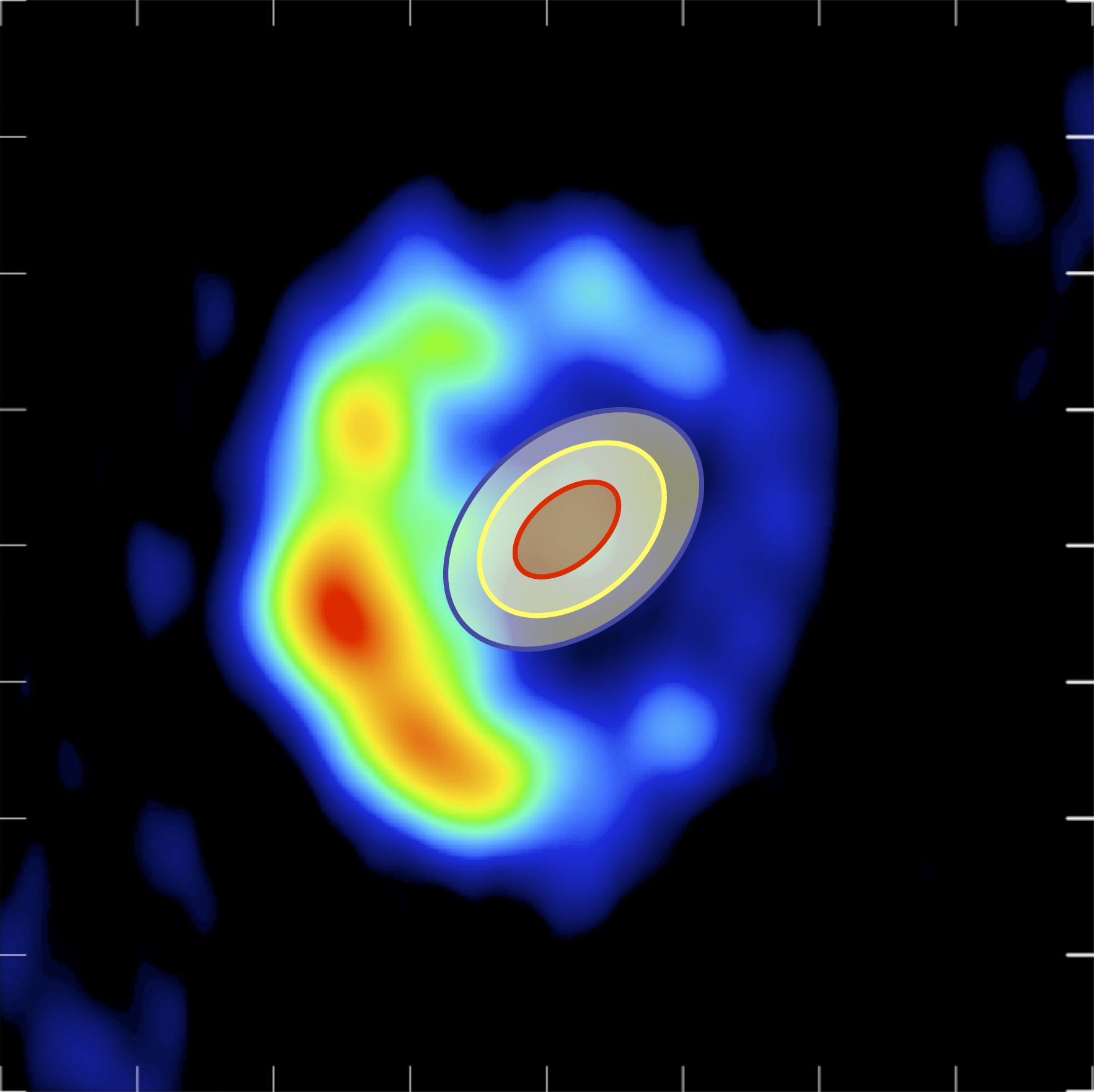
radio profile of RS Ophiuchi, together with the fireball as seen by VLTI 5.5 days after outburst (coloured ellipses).

- Schaefer, B. E. (2010). "Comprehensive Photometric Histories of All Known Galactic Recurrent Novae". Astrophysical Journal. 187 (2): 275–373. arXiv:0912.4426. Bibcode:2010ApJS..187..275S. doi:10.1088/0067-0049/187/2/275. S2CID 119294221.
