= V1369 Centauri =

Nova in the constellation Centaurus

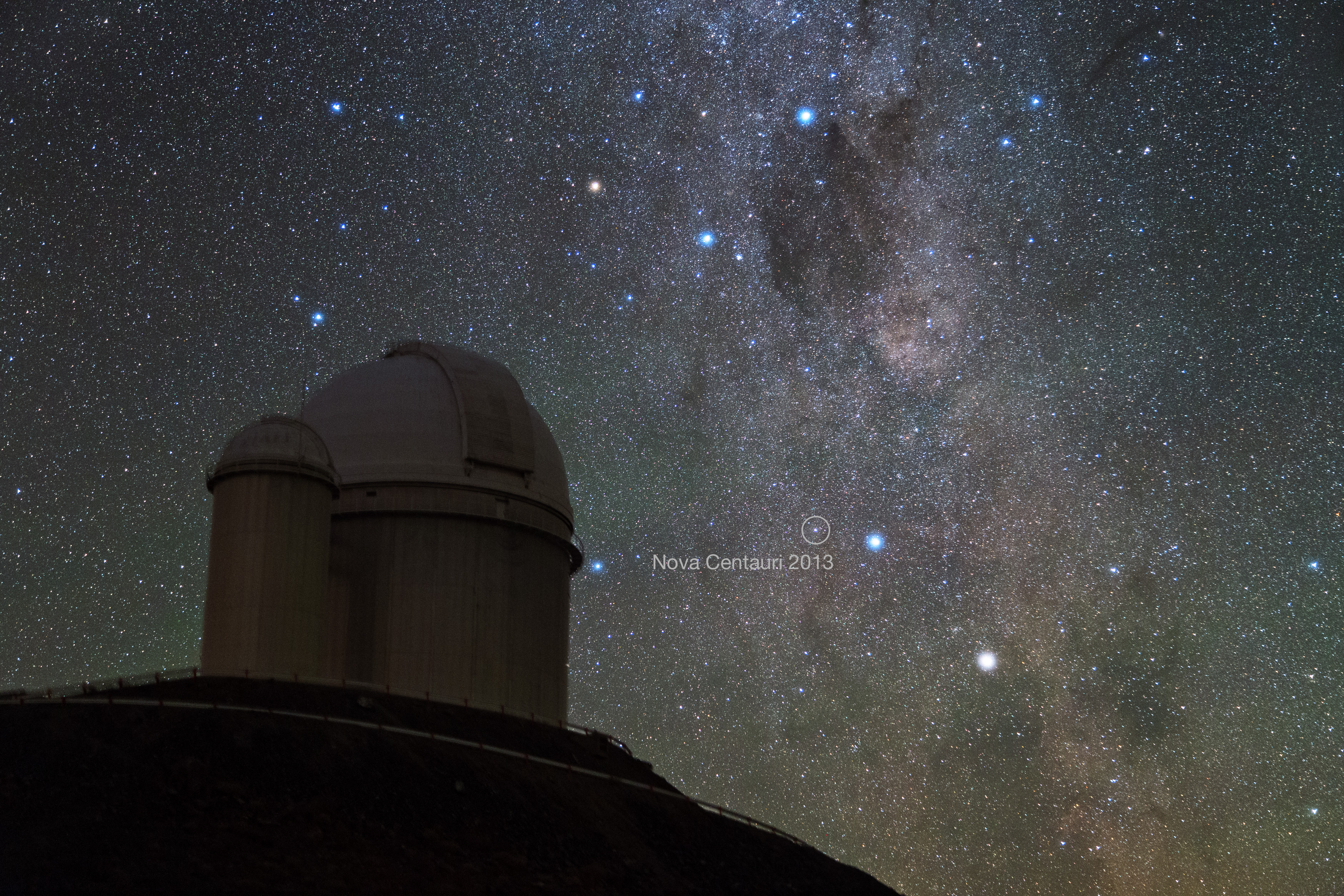
- Nova Centauri as seen from La Silla Observatory, when the star was visible to the naked eye

Observation data Epoch J2000.0 Equinox ICRS
- Constellation: Centaurus
- Right ascension: 13^{h} 54^{m} 45.363^{s}
- Declination: −59° 09′ 04.17″
- Apparent magnitude (V): 3.3 (max)

Astrometry
Proper motion (μ)	RA: −19.096 mas/yr Dec.: −8.004 mas/yr
Parallax (π)	3.6451±0.9686 mas
Distance	274+99 −58 pc

Characteristics
- Variable type: Nova

Other designations
- Nova Centauri 2013, V1369 Cen, PNV J13544700-5909080, 2MASS J13544534-5909040, Gaia DR2 5870613848610810880[

Database references
SIMBAD	data

V1369 Centauri, also known as Nova Centauri 2013, was a bright nova in the constellation Centaurus that occurred in 2013. It was discovered on December 2, 2013 by amateur astronomer John Seach in Australia with a magnitude of 5.5.

On December 14, 2013 it peaked at about magnitude 3.3, making it the brightest nova so far of this millennium.

== Observance history ==
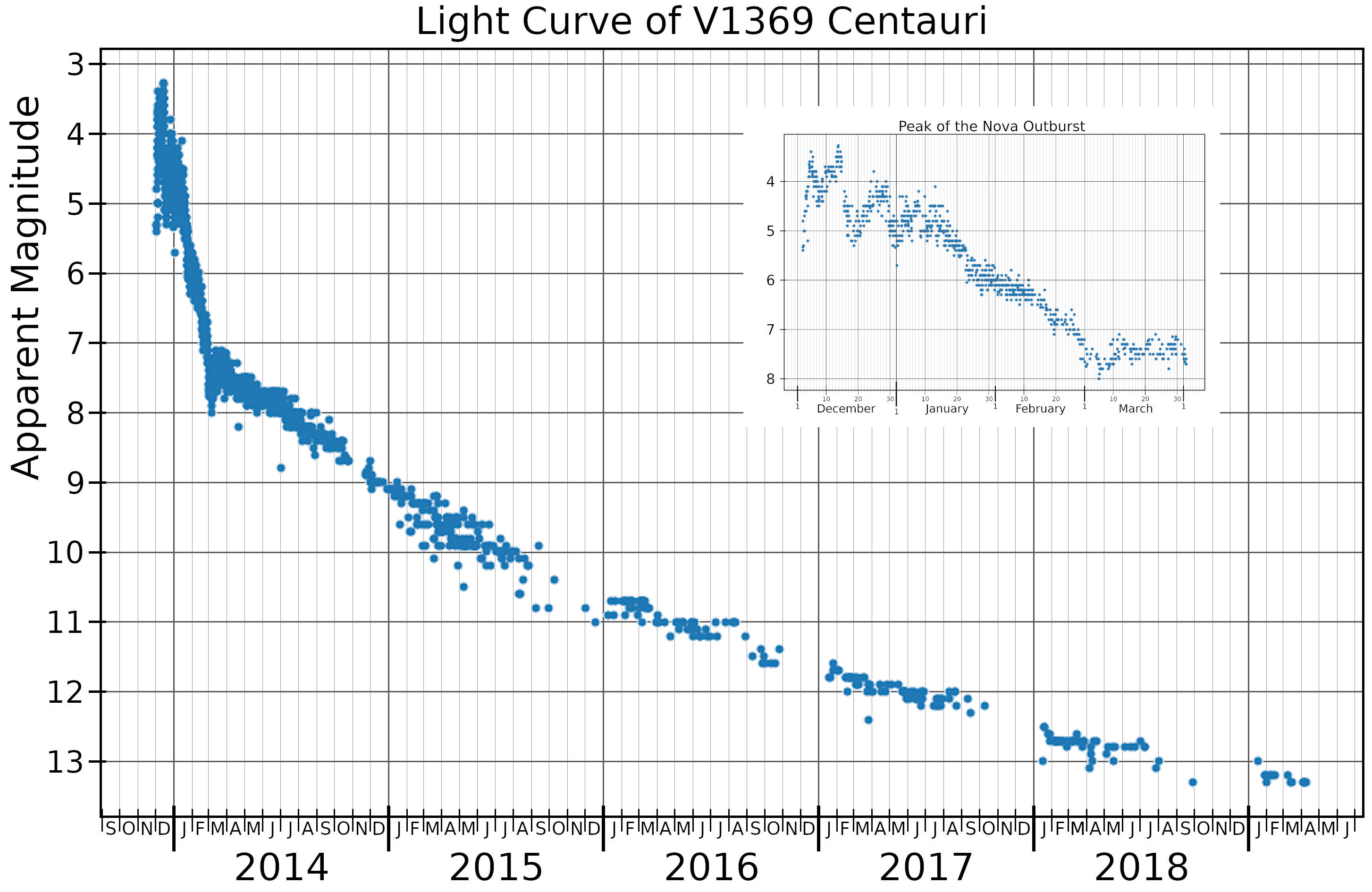
The light curve of V1369 Centauri plotted from AAVSO data.

Nova Centauri 2013 was observed emitting gamma-rays between 7–10 December 2013 by the Fermi Gamma-ray Space Telescope. The nova continued to brighten in gamma-rays and the peak coincided with the second optical maximum on 11 December 2013.

The Swift Gamma-Ray Burst Mission detected X-ray emission from Nova Centauri 2013 on 18 and 25 February 2014 and 8 March 2014.

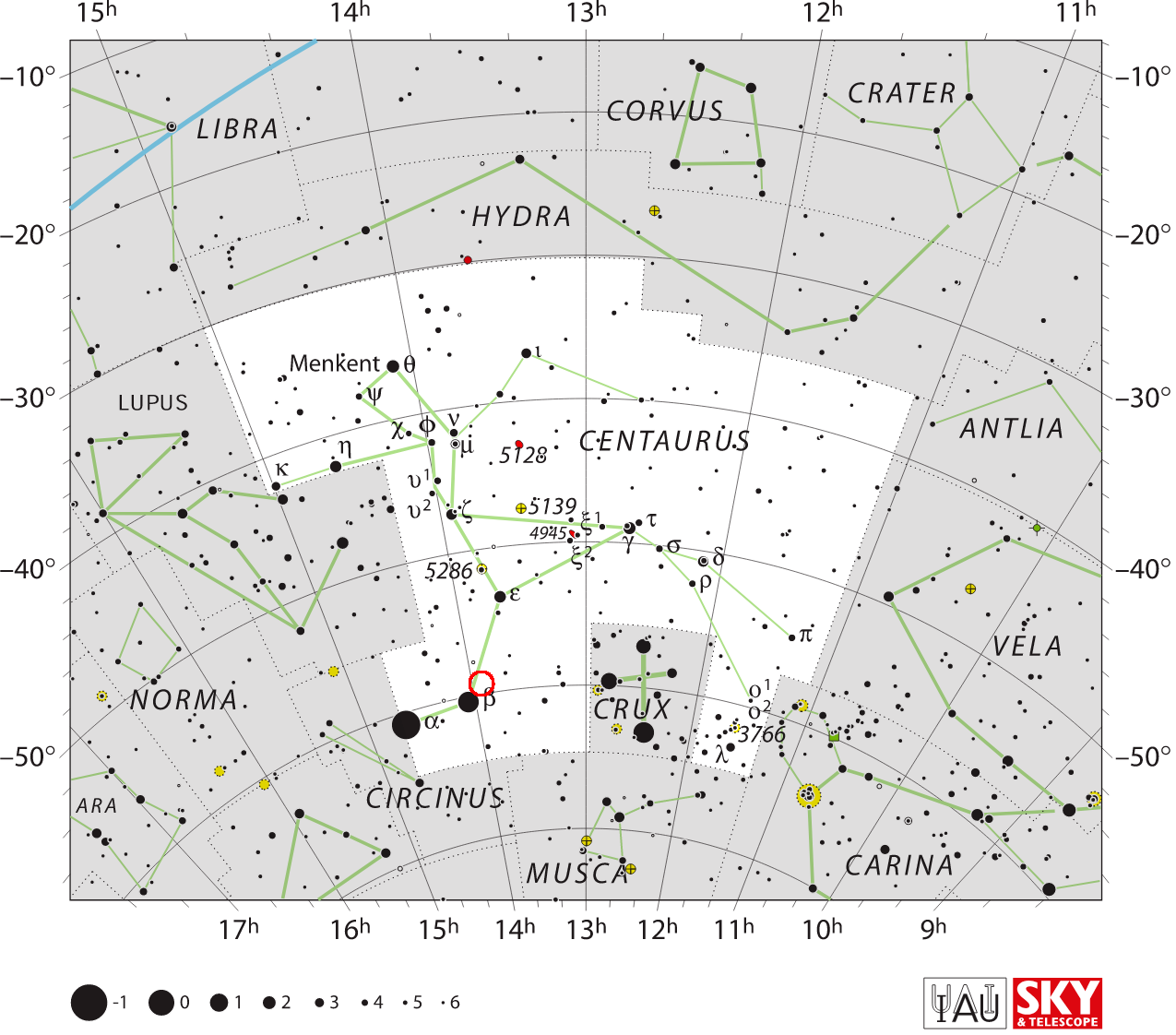
The location of V1369 Centauri (circled in red)

In July 2015 it was announced that lithium had been detected in material ejected from Nova Centauri 2013. This is the first time lithium has been detected in a nova system. The amount detected was less than a billionth of the mass of the Sun. This finding is significant because it supports a theory that the extra lithium found in Population I stars (compared to Population II stars) comes from novae.

== See also ==
- List of novae in the Milky Way galaxy
