= Nova =

Nuclear explosion in a white dwarf star

Artist's conception of a white dwarf, right, accreting hydrogen from the Roche lobe of its larger companion star

A nova is a transient astronomical event that causes the sudden appearance of a bright, apparently "new" star (hence the name "nova", Latin for "new"; the shortened form of "stella nova", Latin for "new star") that slowly fades over weeks or months. All observed novae involve white dwarfs in close binary systems, but causes of the dramatic appearance of a nova vary, depending on the circumstances of the two progenitor stars. The main sub-classes of novae are classical novae, recurrent novae (RNe), and dwarf novae. They are all considered to be cataclysmic variable stars.

Classical nova eruptions are the most common type. This type is usually created in a close binary star system consisting of a white dwarf and either a main sequence, subgiant, or red giant star. If the orbital period of the system is a few days or less, the white dwarf is close enough to its companion star to draw accreted matter onto its surface, creating a dense but shallow atmosphere. This atmosphere, mostly consisting of hydrogen, is heated by the hot white dwarf and eventually reaches a critical temperature, causing ignition of rapid runaway fusion. The sudden increase in energy expels the atmosphere into interstellar space, creating the envelope seen as visible light during the nova event. In past centuries such an event was thought to be a new star. A few novae produce short-lived nova remnants, lasting for perhaps several centuries.

A recurrent nova involves the same processes as a classical nova, except that the nova event repeats in cycles of a few decades or less as the companion star again feeds the dense atmosphere of the white dwarf after each ignition, as in the star T Coronae Borealis.

Under certain conditions, mass accretion can eventually trigger runaway fusion that destroys the white dwarf rather than merely expelling its atmosphere. In this case, the event is usually classified as a Type Ia supernova.

Novae most often occur in the sky along the path of the Milky Way, especially near the observed Galactic Center in Sagittarius; however, they can appear anywhere in the sky. They occur far more frequently than galactic supernovae, averaging about ten per year in the Milky Way. Most are found telescopically, perhaps only one every 12–18 months reaching naked-eye visibility. Novae reaching first or second magnitude occur only a few times per century. The last bright nova was V1369 Centauri, which reached 3.3 magnitude on 14 December 2013.

== Etymology ==
During the sixteenth century, astronomer Tycho Brahe observed the supernova SN 1572 in the constellation Cassiopeia. He described it in his book De nova stella (Latin for "concerning the new star"), giving rise to the adoption of the name nova. In this work he argued that a nearby object should be seen to move relative to the fixed stars, and thus the nova had to be very far away. Although SN 1572 was later found to be a supernova and not a nova, the terms were considered interchangeable until the 1930s. After this, novae were called classical novae to distinguish them from supernovae, as their causes and energies were thought to be different, based solely on the observational evidence.

Although the term "stella nova" means "new star", novae most often take place on white dwarfs, which are remnants of extremely old stars.

== Stellar evolution of novae ==
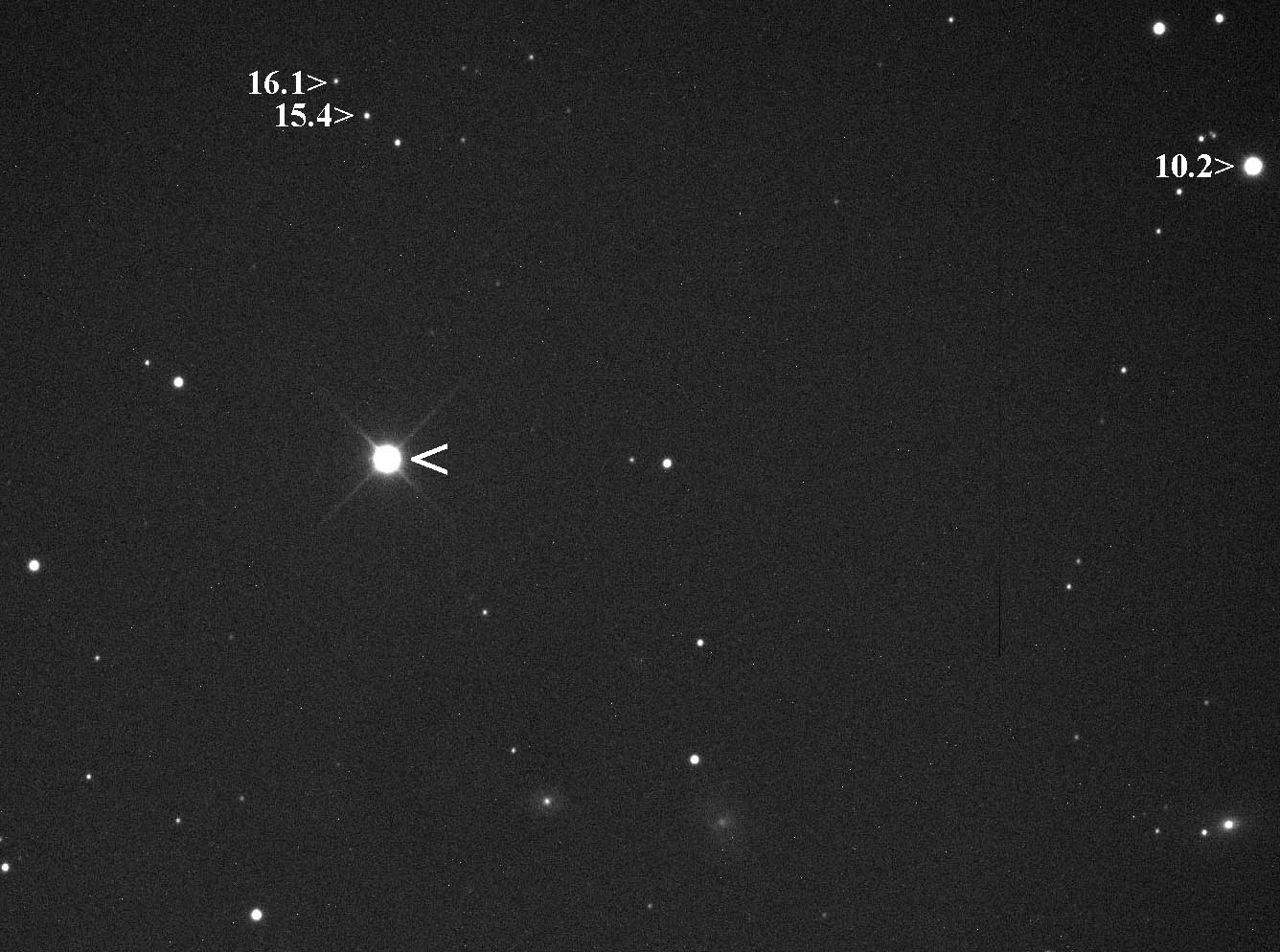
Nova Eridani 2009 (apparent magnitude ~8.4)

Evolution of potential novae begins with two main sequence stars in a binary system. One of the two evolves into a red giant, leaving its remnant white dwarf core in orbit with the remaining star. The second star—which may be either a main-sequence star or an aging giant—begins to shed its envelope onto its white dwarf companion when it overflows its Roche lobe. As a result, the white dwarf steadily captures matter from the companion's outer atmosphere in an accretion disk, and in turn, the accreted matter falls into the atmosphere. As the white dwarf consists of degenerate matter, the accreted hydrogen is unable to expand even though its temperature increases. Runaway fusion occurs when the temperature of this atmospheric layer reaches ~20 million K, initiating nuclear burning via the CNO cycle.

If the accretion rate is just right, hydrogen fusion may occur in a stable manner on the surface of the white dwarf, giving rise to a super soft X-ray source, but for most binary system parameters, the hydrogen burning is thermally unstable and rapidly converts a large amount of the hydrogen into other, heavier chemical elements in a runaway reaction, liberating an enormous amount of energy. This blows the remaining gases away from the surface of the white dwarf and produces an extremely bright outburst of light.

The rise to peak brightness may be very rapid, or gradual; after the peak, the brightness declines steadily. The time taken for a nova to decay by 2 or 3 magnitudes from maximum optical brightness is used for grouping novae into speed classes. Fast novae typically will take less than 25 days to decay by 2 magnitudes, while slow novae will take more than 80 days.

Despite its violence, usually the amount of material ejected in a nova is only about 1/10,000 of a solar mass, quite small relative to the mass of the white dwarf. Furthermore, only five percent of the accreted mass is fused during the power outburst. Nonetheless, this is enough energy to accelerate nova ejecta to velocities as high as several thousand kilometers per second—higher for fast novae than slow ones—with a concurrent rise in luminosity from a few times solar to 50,000–100,000 times solar. In 2010 scientists using NASA's Fermi Gamma-ray Space Telescope discovered that a nova also can emit gamma rays (>100 MeV).

Potentially, a white dwarf can generate multiple novae over time as additional hydrogen continues to accrete onto its surface from its companion star. Where this repeated flaring is observed, the object is called a recurrent nova. An example is RS Ophiuchi, which is known to have flared seven times (in 1898, 1933, 1958, 1967, 1985, 2006, and 2021). Eventually, the white dwarf can explode as a Type Ia supernova if it approaches the Chandrasekhar limit.

Occasionally, novae are bright enough and close enough to Earth to be conspicuous to the unaided eye. The brightest recent example was Nova Cygni 1975. This nova appeared on 29 August 1975, in the constellation Cygnus about 5 degrees north of Deneb, and reached magnitude 2.0 (nearly as bright as Deneb). The most recent bright novae were V1280 Scorpii, which reached magnitude 3.7 on 17 February 2007, and Nova Delphini 2013. Nova Centauri 2013 was discovered 2 December 2013 and so far is the brightest nova of this millennium, reaching magnitude 3.3.

=== Helium novae ===
A helium nova (undergoing a helium flash) is a proposed category of nova event that lacks hydrogen lines in its spectrum. The absence of hydrogen lines may be caused by the explosion of a helium shell on a white dwarf. The theory was first proposed in 1989, and the first candidate helium nova to be observed was V445 Puppis, in 2000. Since then, four other novae have been proposed as helium novae.

== Occurrence rate and astrophysical significance ==
Astronomers have estimated that the Milky Way experiences roughly 25 to 75 novae per year. The number of novae actually observed in the Milky Way each year is much lower, about 10, probably because distant novae are obscured by gas and dust absorption. As of 2019, 407 probable novae had been recorded in the Milky Way. In the Andromeda Galaxy, roughly 25 novae brighter than about 20th magnitude are discovered each year, and smaller numbers are seen in other nearby galaxies.

Spectroscopic observation of nova ejecta nebulae has shown that they are enriched in elements such as helium, carbon, nitrogen, oxygen, neon, and magnesium. Classical nova explosions are now considered to be a major, and possibly dominant, source of lithium enrichment in the Galactic disc, according to recent Galactic chemical evolution models. The contribution of novae to the interstellar medium is not great; novae supply only 1/50 as much material to the galaxy as do supernovae, and only 1/200 as much as red giant and supergiant stars.

Observed recurrent novae such as RS Ophiuchi (those with periods on the order of decades) are rare. Astronomers theorize, however, that most, if not all, novae recur, albeit on time scales ranging from 1,000 to 100,000 years. The recurrence interval for a nova is less dependent on the accretion rate of the white dwarf than on its mass; with their powerful gravity, massive white dwarfs require less accretion to fuel an eruption than lower-mass ones. Consequently, the interval is shorter for high-mass white dwarfs.

V Sagittae is unusual in that the time of its next eruption can be predicted fairly accurately; it is expected to recur in approximately 2083, plus or minus about 11 years.

=== Subtypes ===
Novae are classified according to the light curve decay speed, referred to as either type A, B, C and R, or using the prefix "N":

- NA: fast novae, with a rapid brightness increase, followed by a brightness decline of 3 magnitudes—to about 1/16 brightness—within 100 days.
- NB: slow novae, with a brightness decline of 3 magnitudes in 150 days or more.
- NC: very slow novae, also known as symbiotic novae, staying at maximum light for a decade or more and then fading very slowly.
- NR/RN: recurrent novae, where two or more eruptions separated by 80 years or less have been observed. These are generally also fast.

== Remnants ==
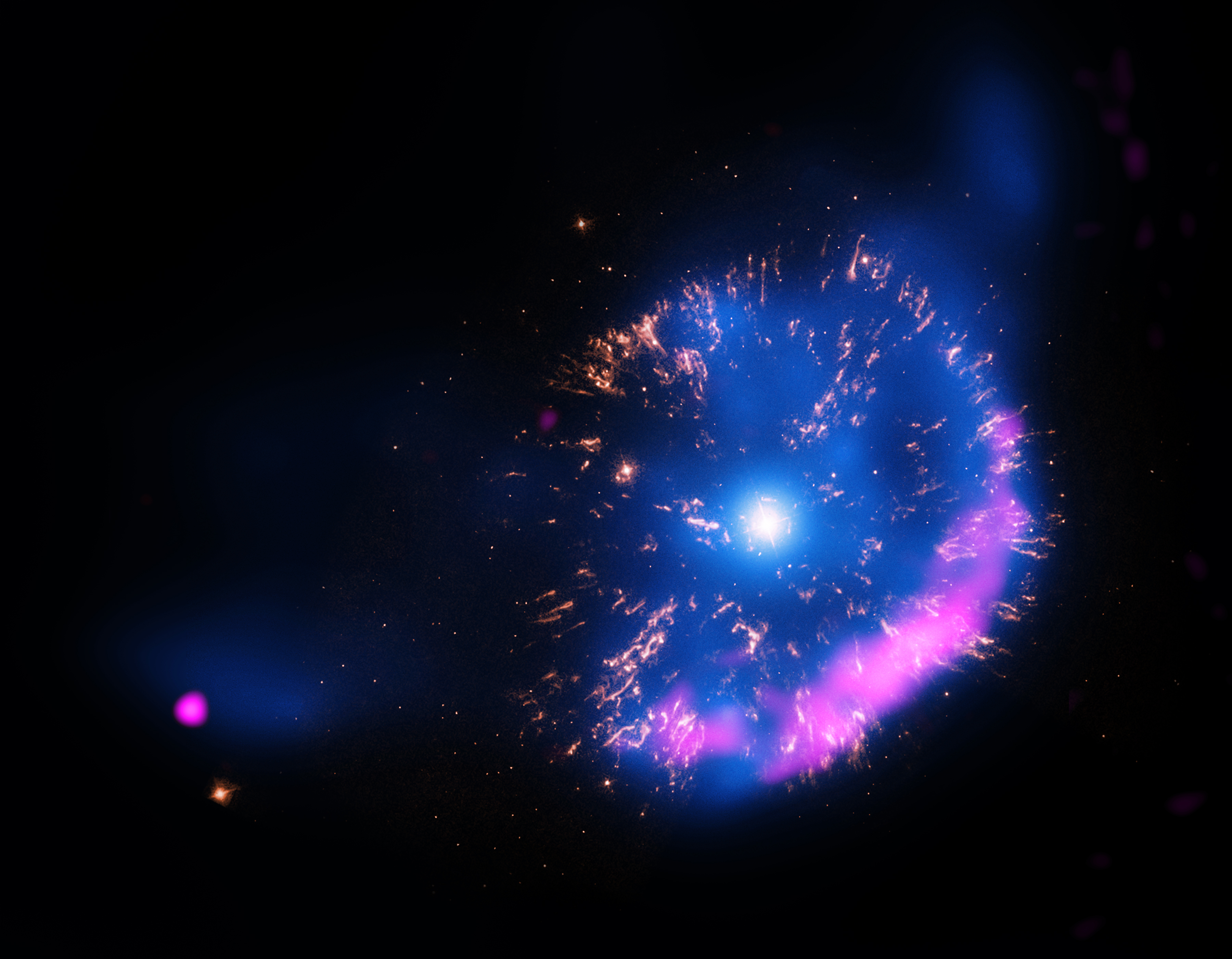
GK Persei: Nova of 1901

Some novae leave behind visible nebulosity, material expelled in the nova explosion or in multiple explosions.

== Novae as distance indicators ==
Novae have some promise for use as standard candle measurements of distances. For instance, the distribution of their absolute magnitude is bimodal, with a main peak at magnitude −8.8, and a lesser one at −7.5. Novae also have roughly the same absolute magnitude 15 days after their peak (−5.5). Nova-based distance estimates to various nearby galaxies and galaxy clusters have been shown to be of comparable accuracy to those measured with Cepheid variable stars.

== Recurrent novae ==
A recurrent nova (RN) is an object that has been seen to experience repeated nova eruptions. The recurrent nova typically brightens by about 9 magnitudes, whereas a classical nova may brighten by more than 12 magnitudes.

Although it is estimated that as many as a quarter of nova systems experience multiple eruptions, only ten recurrent novae (listed below) have been observed in the Milky Way.

Several extragalactic recurrent novae have been observed in the Andromeda Galaxy (M31) and the Large Magellanic Cloud. One of these extragalactic novae, M31N 2008-12a, erupts as frequently as once every 12 months.

On 20 April 2016, the Sky & Telescope website reported a sustained brightening of recurrent nova T Coronae Borealis from magnitude 10.5 to about 9.2 starting in February 2015. A similar event reported in 1938 was followed by an outburst in 1946. By June 2018, the star had dimmed slightly but still remained at an unusually high level of activity. In March or April 2023, it dimmed to magnitude 12.3. A similar dimming occurred in the year before the 1945 outburst, prompting some to suggest that it would likely erupt between March and September 2024. As of November 3, 2026, this predicted outburst has not yet occurred.

Full name	Discoverer	Distance (ly)	Magnitude range	Days to drop 3 magnitudes from peak	Known eruption years	Interval (years)	Years since latest eruption
CI Aquilae	K. Reinmuth	8590±830	8.6–16.3	40	1917, 1941, 2000	24–59	26
V394 Coronae Australis	L. E. Erro	17000±3000	7.2–19.7	6	1949, 1987	38	39
T Coronae Borealis	J. Birmingham	2987±75	2.5–10.8	6	1217, 1787, 1866, 1946	79–82	80
IM Normae	I. E. Woods	9800±1600	8.5–18.5	70	1920, 2002	≤82	24
RS Ophiuchi	W. Fleming	8740±850	4.8–11	14	1898, 1907, 1933, 1958, 1967, 1985, 2006, 2021	9–26	5
V2487 Ophiuchi	K. Takamizawa (1998)	20900±5200	9.5–17.5	9	1900, 1998	98	28
T Pyxidis	H. Leavitt	9410±780	6.4–15.5	62	1890, 1902, 1920, 1944, 1967, 2011	12–44	15
V3890 Sagittarii	H. Dinerstein	16000	8.1–18.4	14	1962, 1990, 2019	28–29	7
U Scorpii	N. R. Pogson	31300±2000	7.5–17.6	2.6	1863, 1906, 1917, 1936, 1979, 1987, 1999, 2010, 2022,	8–43	4
V745 Scorpii	L. Plaut	25400±2600	9.4–19.3	7	1937, 1989, 2014	25–52	12

== Extragalactic novae ==
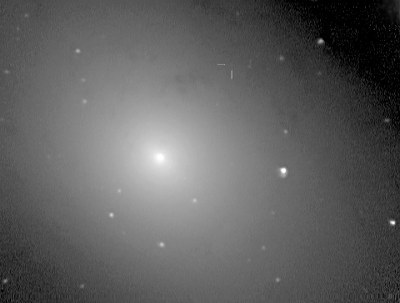
Nova in Andromeda Galaxy

Novae are relatively common in the Andromeda Galaxy (M31); including recurrent ones. several dozen novae (brighter than apparent magnitude +20) are discovered in M31 each year. The Central Bureau for Astronomical Telegrams (CBAT) has tracked novae in M31, M33, and M81.

== See also ==
- Cosmic distance ladder – Succession of methods by which astronomers determine the distances to celestial objects
- Crab Nebula – Supernova remnant in the constellation Taurus
- Guest star (astronomy) – Ancient Chinese term for cataclysmic variable stars
- Hypernova – Supernova that ejects a large mass at unusually high velocity
- Kilonova – Aftermath of a neutron star merger
- Micronova – Explosive stellar phenomenon about one millionth the strength of a classical nova
- Superluminous supernova – Supernova at least ten times more luminous than a standard supernova
- Supernova – Astrophysical phenomenon
- Supernova impostor – Stellar explosions that appear to be supernovae
- X-ray burster – Class of X-ray binary stars
