= Barbara McCarthy =

Barbara McCarthy may refer to

- Barbara P. McCarthy (1904–1988), American Hellenist and academic
- Barbara McCarthy (American politician) (1934–2014), American politician
- Malarndirri McCarthy (born 1970), Australian politician
