= Crab Nebula =

Supernova remnant in the constellation Taurus

Nebula
- Supernova remnant
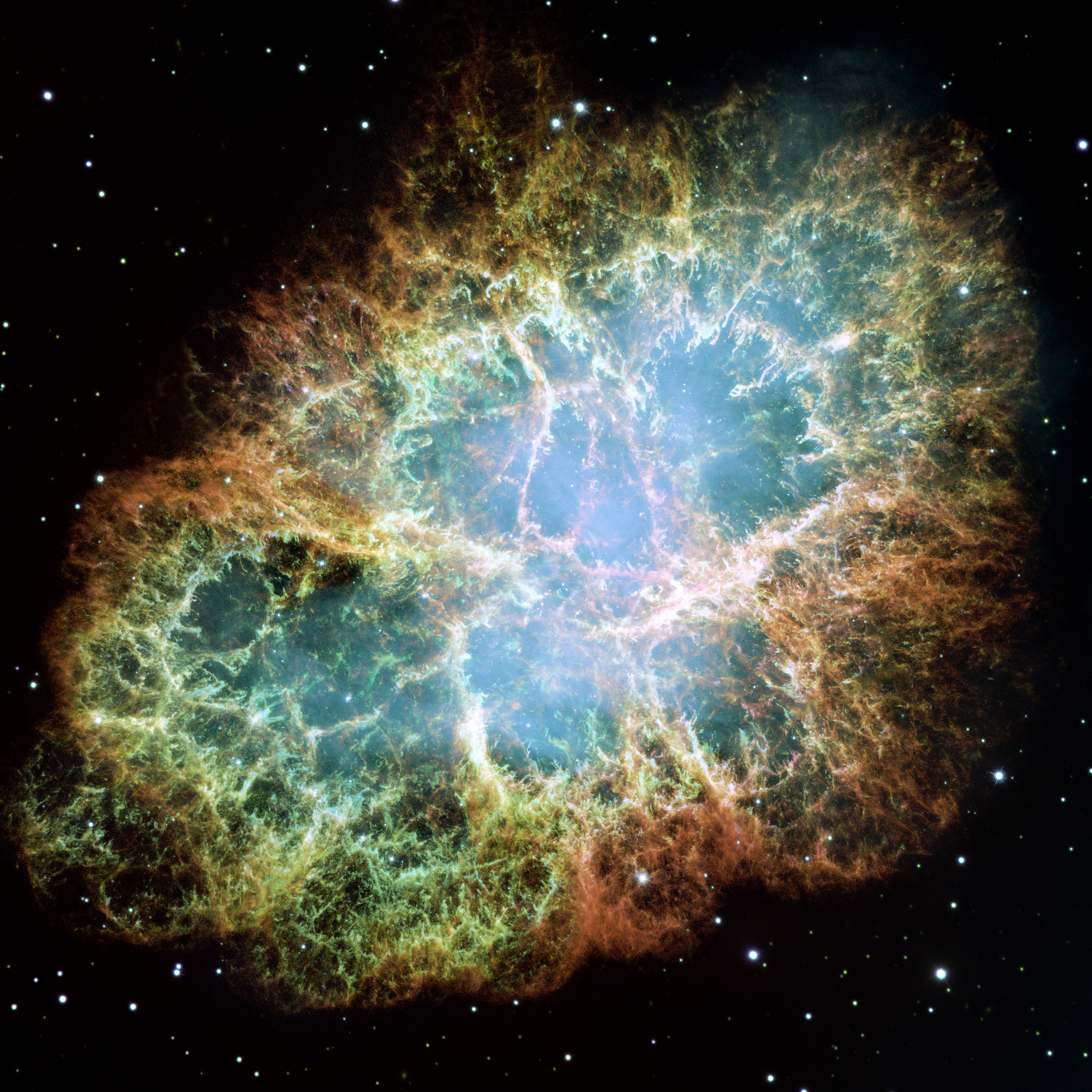
- Hubble Space Telescope mosaic image assembled from 24 individual Wide Field and Planetary Camera 2 exposures taken in October 1999, January 2000, and December 2000

Observation data: J2000.0 epoch
- Right ascension: 05^{h} 34^{m} 31.8^{s} ICRS
- Declination: +22° 01′ 03″ ICRS
- Distance: 6500±1600 ly (2000±500 pc)
- Apparent magnitude (V): 8.4
- Apparent dimensions (V): 420″ × 290″^{[a]}
- Constellation: Taurus

Physical characteristics
- Radius: ~5.5 ly (~1.7 pc)
- Absolute magnitude (V): −3.1±0.5^{[b]}
- Notable features: Optical pulsar
- Designations: Messier 1, NGC 1952, Taurus A, Sh2-244

The Crab Nebula (catalogue designations M1, NGC 1952, Taurus A) is a supernova remnant and pulsar wind nebula in the constellation of Taurus. The common name comes from a drawing that somewhat resembled a crab with arms produced by William Parsons, 3rd Earl of Rosse, in 1842 or 1843 using a 36-inch (91 cm) telescope. The nebula was discovered by English astronomer John Bevis in 1731. It corresponds with a bright supernova observed in AD 1054 by Native American, Japanese, and Arab stargazers; this supernova was also recorded by Chinese astronomers as a guest star. The nebula was the first astronomical object identified that corresponds with a historically-observed supernova explosion.

At an apparent magnitude of 8.4, comparable to that of Saturn's moon Titan, it is not visible to the naked eye but can be made out using binoculars under favourable conditions. The nebula lies in the Perseus Arm of the Milky Way galaxy, at a distance of about 2.0 kiloparsecs (6,500 ly) from Earth. It has a diameter of 3.4 parsecs (11 ly), corresponding to an apparent diameter of some 7 arcminutes, and is expanding at a rate of about 1,500 kilometres per second (930 mi/s), or 0.5% of the speed of light.

The Crab Pulsar, a neutron star 28–30 kilometres (17–19 mi) across with a spin rate of 30.2 times per second, lies at the center of the Crab Nebula. The star emits pulses of radiation from gamma rays to radio waves. At X-ray and gamma ray energies above 30 keV, the Crab Nebula is generally the brightest persistent gamma-ray source in the sky, with measured flux extending to above 10 TeV. The nebula's radiation allows detailed study of celestial bodies that occult it. In the 1950s and 1960s, the Sun's corona was mapped from observations of the Crab Nebula's radio waves passing through it, and in 2003, the thickness of the atmosphere of Saturn's moon Titan was measured as it blocked out X-rays from the nebula.

== Observational history ==
The earliest recorded documentation of observation of astronomical object SN 1054 was as it was occurring in 1054, by Chinese astronomers and Japanese observers, hence its numerical identification. Modern understanding that the Crab Nebula was created by a supernova traces back to 1921, when Carl Otto Lampland announced that he had seen changes in the nebula's structure.^{[d]} This eventually led to the conclusion that the creation of the Crab Nebula corresponds to the bright SN 1054 supernova recorded by medieval astronomers in AD 1054.

=== First identification ===
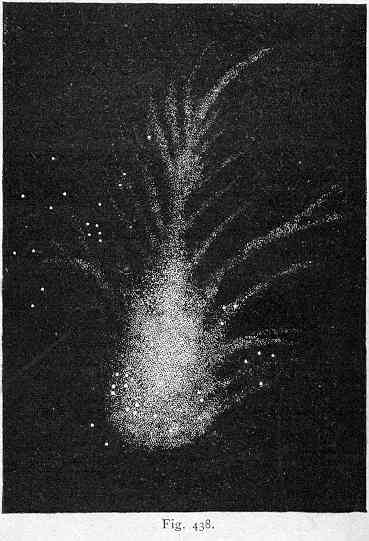
Reproduction of the first depiction of the nebula by Lord Rosse (1844) (colour-inverted to appear white-on-black)

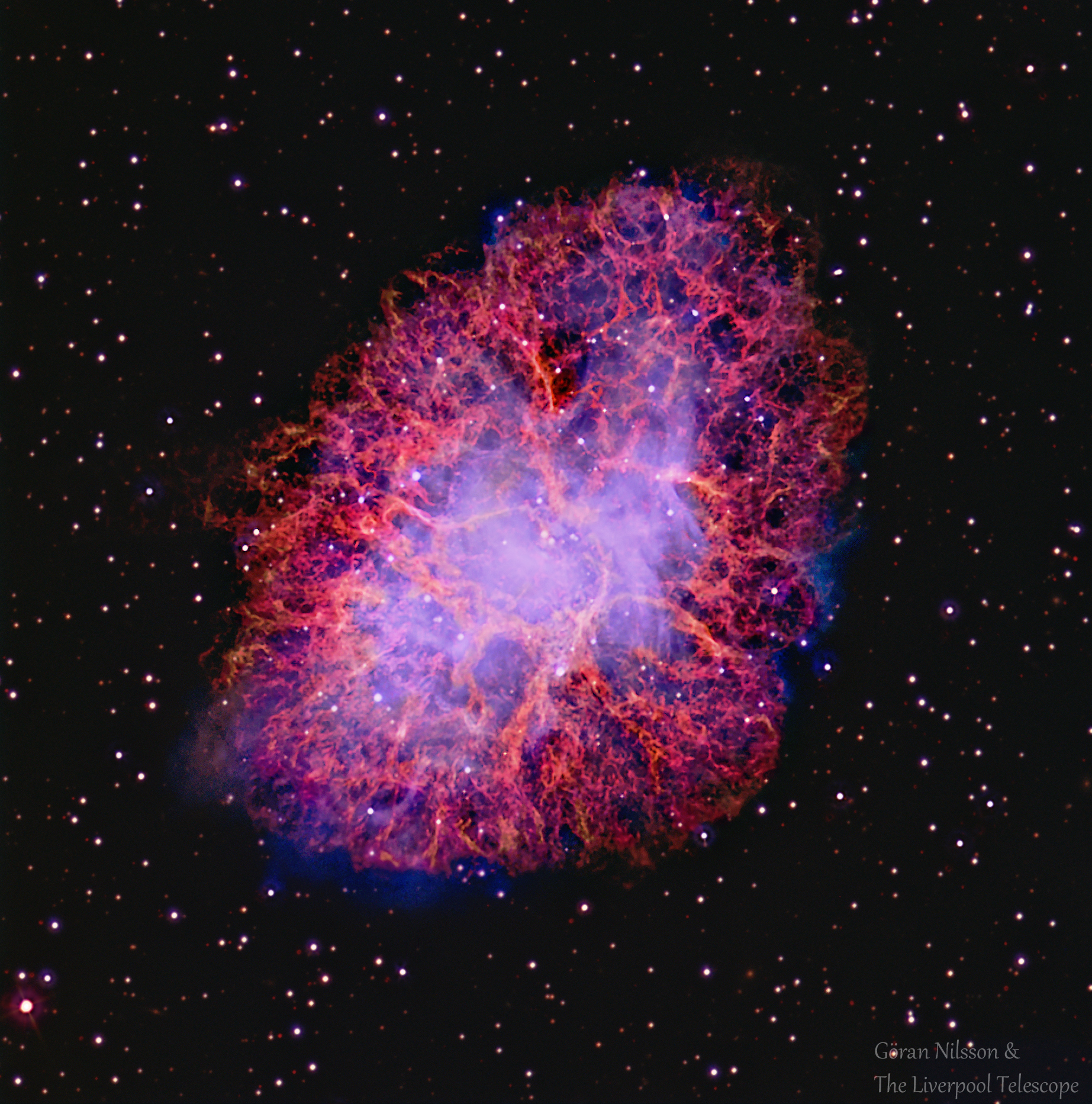
HaRGB image of the Crab Nebula from the Liverpool Telescope, exposures totalling 1.4 hours.

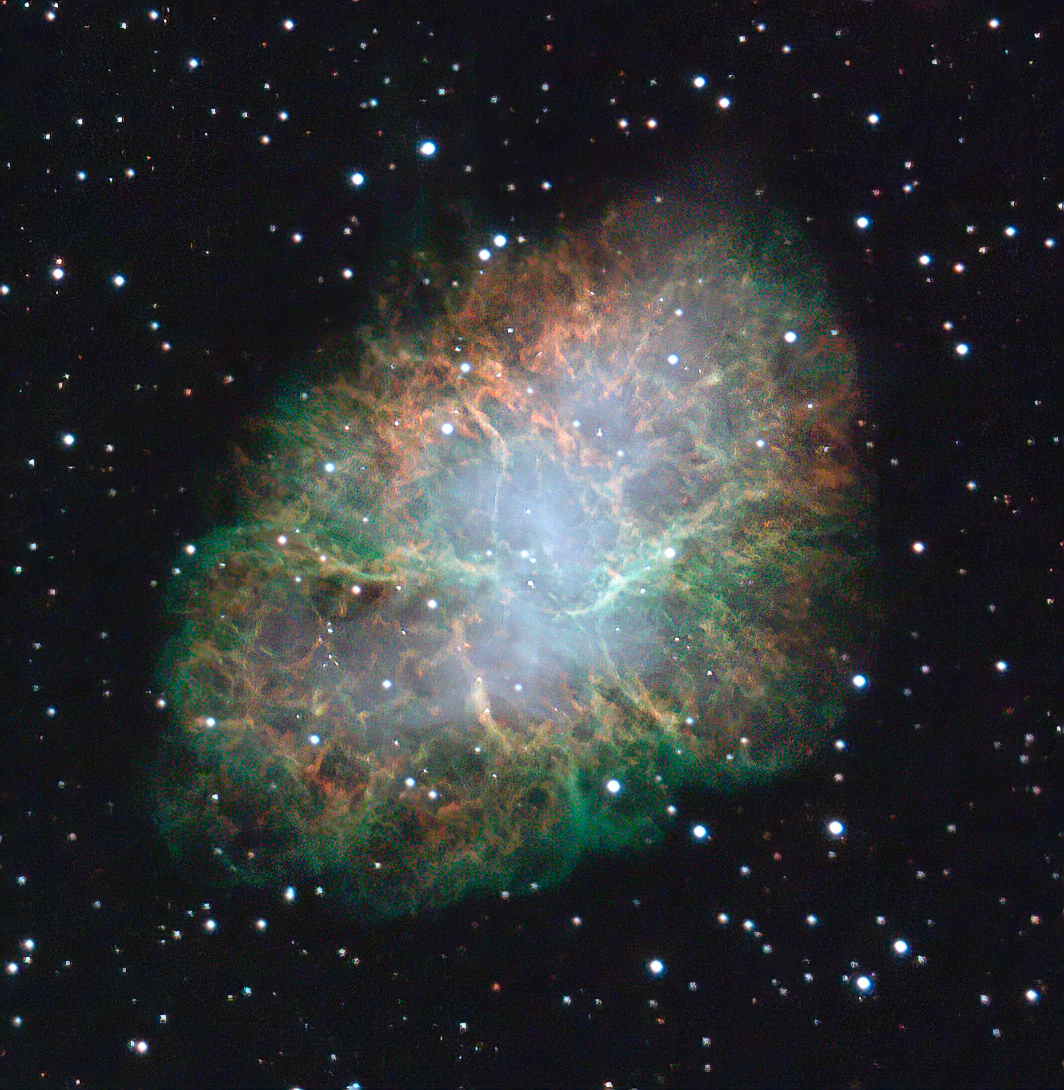
The Crab Nebula M1

The Crab Nebula was first identified in 1731 by John Bevis. The nebula was independently rediscovered in 1758 by Charles Messier as he was observing a bright comet. Messier catalogued it as the first entry in his catalogue of comet-like objects; in 1757, Alexis Clairaut reexamined the calculations of Edmund Halley and predicted the return of Halley's Comet in late 1758. The exact time of the comet's return required the consideration of perturbations to its orbit caused by planets in the Solar System such as Jupiter, which Clairaut and his two colleagues Jérôme Lalande and Nicole-Reine Lepaute carried out more precisely than Halley, finding that the comet should appear in the constellation of Taurus. It was in searching in vain for the comet that Charles Messier found the Crab Nebula, which he at first thought to be Halley's comet. After some observation, noticing that the object that he was observing was not moving across the sky, Messier concluded that the object was not a comet. Messier then realised the usefulness of compiling a catalogue of celestial objects of a cloudy nature, but fixed in the sky, to avoid incorrectly cataloguing them as comets. This realization led him to compile the "Messier catalogue".

William Herschel observed the Crab Nebula numerous times between 1783 and 1809, but it is not known whether he was aware of its existence in 1783, or if he discovered it independently of Messier and Bevis. After several observations, he concluded that it was composed of a group of stars. William Parsons, 3rd Earl of Rosse observed the nebula at Birr Castle in the early 1840s using a 36-inch (0.9 m) telescope, and made a drawing of it that showed it with arms like those of a crab. He observed it again later, in 1848, using a 72-inch (1.8 m) telescope but could not confirm the supposed resemblance, but the name stuck nevertheless.

=== Connection to SN 1054 ===
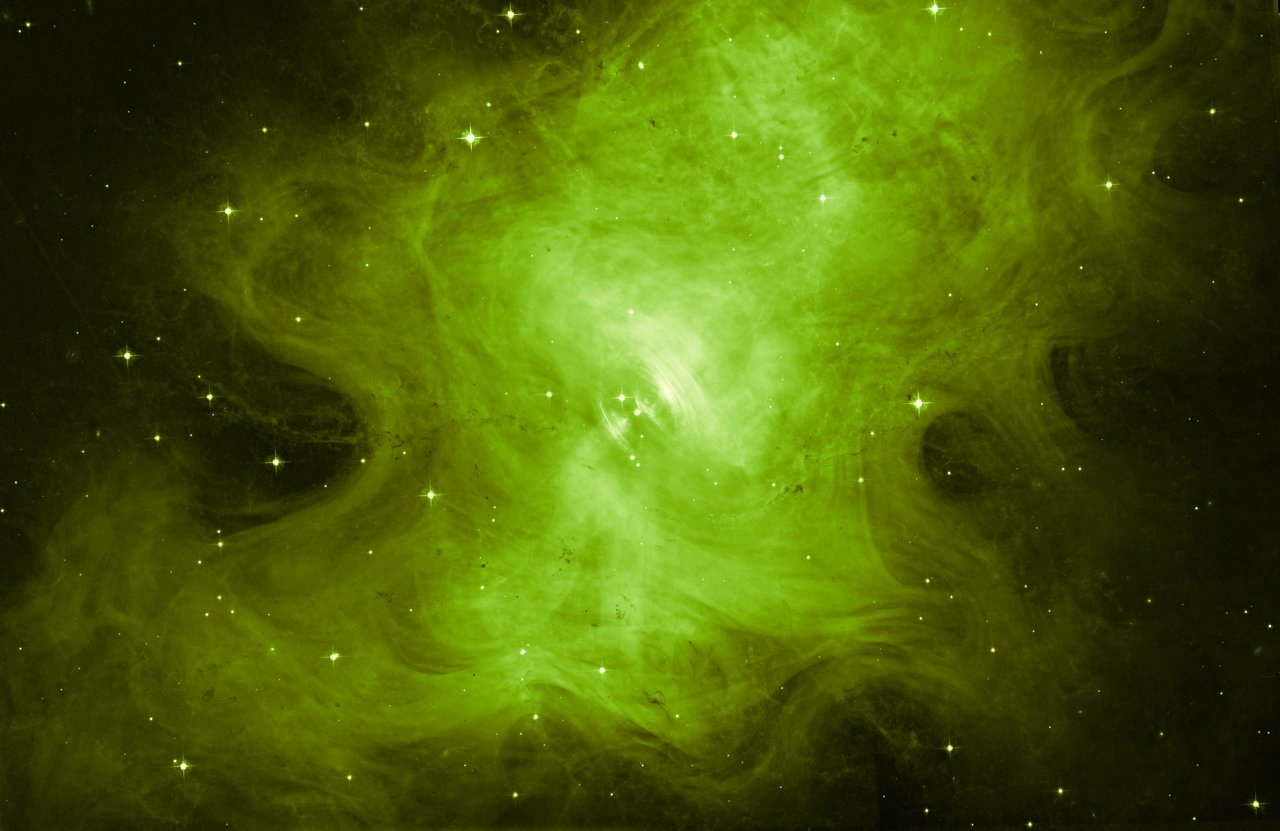
The nebula is seen in the visible spectrum at 550 nm (green light).

The Crab Nebula was the first astronomical object recognized as being connected to a supernova explosion. In the early twentieth century, the analysis of early photographs of the nebula taken several years apart revealed that it was expanding. Tracing the expansion back revealed that the nebula must have become visible on Earth about 900 years before. Historical records revealed that a new star bright enough to be seen in the daytime had been recorded in the same part of the sky by Chinese astronomers on 4 July 1054, and probably also by Japanese observers.

In 1913, when Vesto Slipher registered his spectroscopy study of the sky, the Crab Nebula was again one of the first objects to be studied. Changes in the cloud, suggesting its small extent, were discovered by Carl Lampland in 1921. That same year, John Charles Duncan demonstrated that the remnant was expanding, while Knut Lundmark noted its proximity to the guest star of 1054.

In 1928, Edwin Hubble proposed associating the cloud with the star of 1054, an idea that remained controversial until the nature of supernovae was understood, and it was Nicholas Mayall who indicated that the star of 1054 was undoubtedly the supernova whose explosion produced the Crab Nebula. The search for historical supernovae started at that moment: seven other historical sightings have been found by comparing modern observations of supernova remnants with astronomical documents of past centuries.

After the original connection to Chinese observations, in 1934 connections were made to a 13th-century Japanese reference to a "guest star" in Meigetsuki a few weeks before the Chinese reference. The event was long considered unrecorded in Islamic astronomy, but in 1978 a reference was found in a 13th-century copy made by Ibn Abi Usaibia of a work by Ibn Butlan, a Nestorian Christian physician active in Baghdad at the time of the supernova.

Given its great distance, the daytime "guest star" observed by the Chinese could only have been a supernova—a massive, exploding star, having exhausted its supply of energy from nuclear fusion and collapsed in on itself. Recent analysis of historical records have found that the supernova that created the Crab Nebula probably appeared in April or early May, rising to its maximum brightness of between apparent magnitude −7 and −4.5 (brighter even than Venus' −4.2 and everything in the night sky except the Moon) by July. The supernova was visible to the naked eye for about two years after its first observation.

=== Crab Pulsar ===
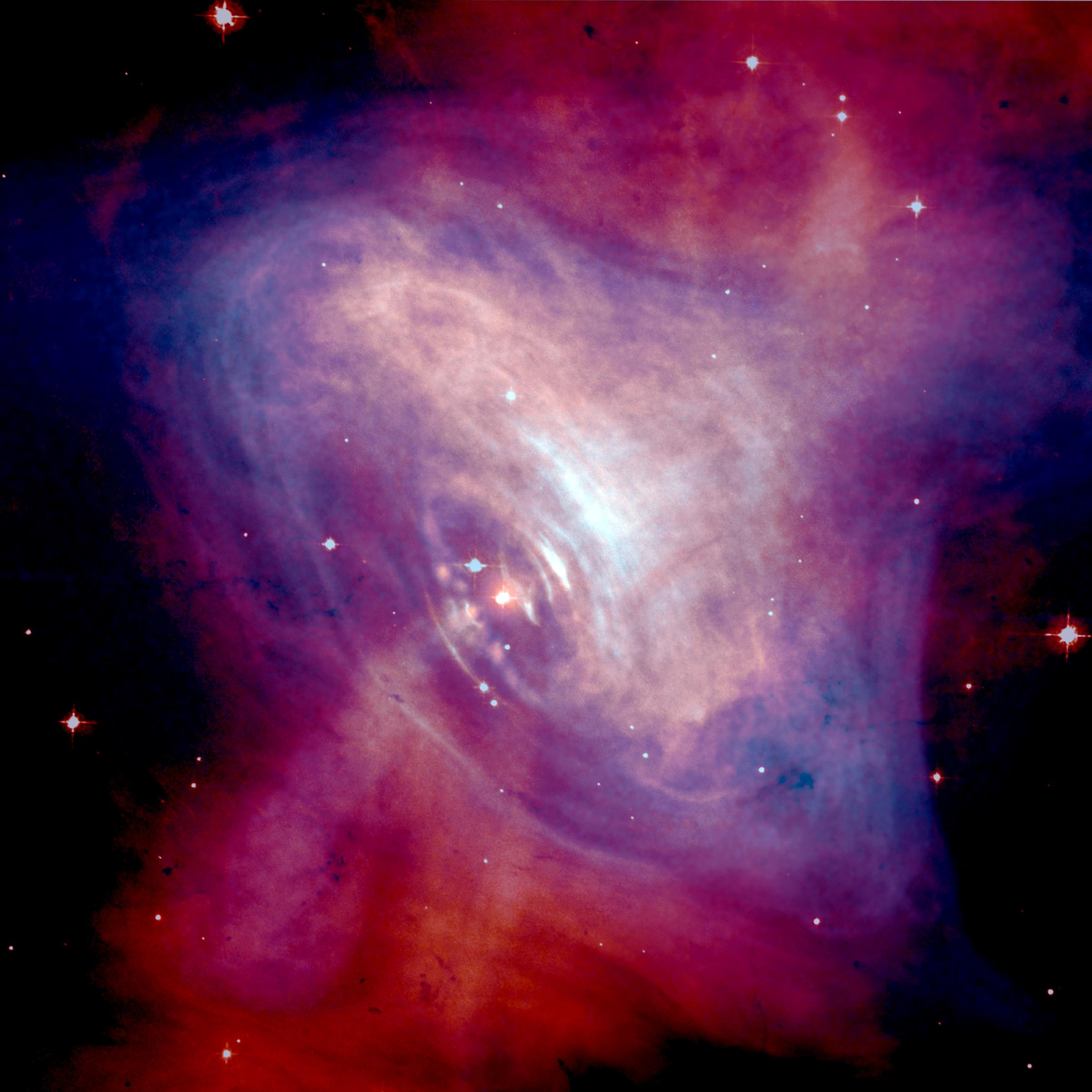
Image combining optical data from Hubble (in red) and X-ray images from Chandra X-ray Observatory (in blue).

In the 1960s, because of the prediction and discovery of pulsars, the Crab Nebula again became a major center of interest. It was then that Franco Pacini predicted the existence of the Crab Pulsar for the first time, which would explain the brightness of the cloud. In late 1968, David H. Staelin and Edward C. Reifenstein III reported the discovery of two rapidly variable radio sources in the area of the Crab Nebula using the Green Bank Telescope. They named them NP 0527 and NP 0532. The period of 33 milliseconds and precise location of the Crab Nebula pulsar NP 0532 was discovered by Richard V. E. Lovelace and collaborators on 10 November 1968 at the Arecibo Radio Observatory. This discovery also proved that pulsars are rotating neutron stars (not pulsating white dwarfs, as many scientists suggested). Soon after the discovery of the Crab Pulsar, David Richards discovered (using the Arecibo Observatory) that the Crab Pulsar spins down and, therefore, the pulsar loses its rotational energy. Thomas Gold has shown that the spin-down power of the pulsar is sufficient to power the Crab Nebula.

The discovery of the Crab Pulsar and the knowledge of its exact age (almost to the day) allows for the verification of basic physical properties of these objects, such as characteristic age and spin-down luminosity, the orders of magnitude involved (notably the strength of the magnetic field), along with various aspects related to the dynamics of the remnant. The role of this supernova to the scientific understanding of supernova remnants was crucial, as no other historical supernova created a pulsar whose precise age is known for certain. The only possible exception to this rule would be SN 1181, whose supposed remnant 3C 58 is home to a pulsar, but its identification using Chinese observations from 1181 is contested.

The inner part of the Crab Nebula is dominated by a pulsar wind nebula enveloping the pulsar. Some sources consider the Crab Nebula to be an example of both a pulsar wind nebula as well as a supernova remnant, while others separate the two phenomena based on the different sources of energy production and behaviour.

=== Source of high-energy gamma rays ===
The Crab Nebula was the first astrophysical object confirmed to emit gamma rays in the very-high-energy (VHE) band above 100 GeV in energy. The VHE detection was carried out in 1989 by the Whipple Observatory 10m Gamma-Ray telescope, which opened the VHE gamma-ray window and led to the detection of numerous VHE sources since then.

In 2019 the Crab Nebula was observed to emit gamma rays in excess of 100 TeV, making it the first identified source beyond 100 TeV.

== Physical parameters ==
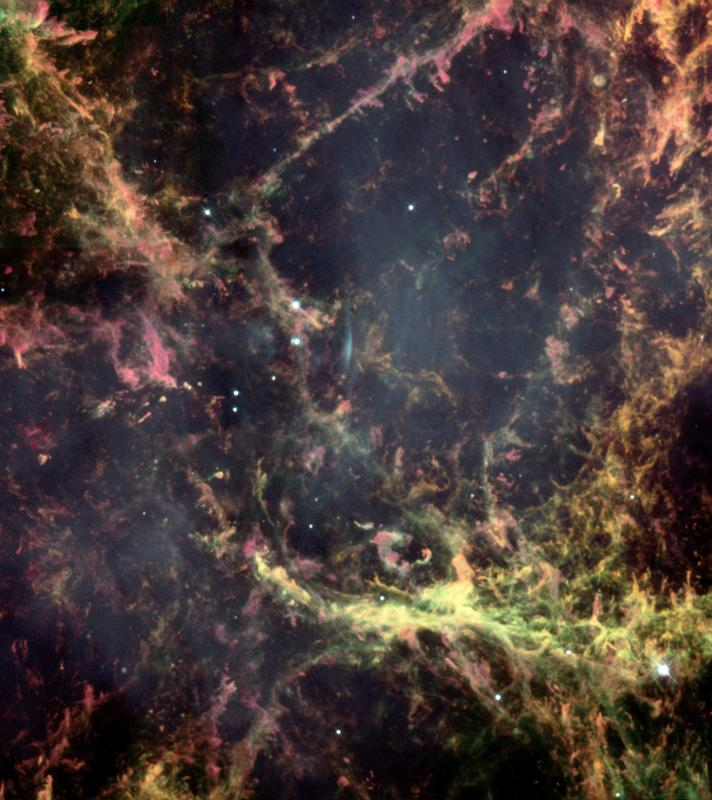
Hubble image of a small region of the Crab Nebula, showing Rayleigh–Taylor instabilities in its intricate filamentary structure.

In visible light, the Crab Nebula consists of a broadly oval-shaped mass of filaments, about 6 arcminutes long and 4 arcminutes wide (by comparison, the full moon is 30 arcminutes across) surrounding a diffuse blue central region. In three dimensions, the nebula is thought to be shaped either like an oblate spheroid (estimated as 1,380 pc/4,500 ly away) or a prolate spheroid (estimated as 2,020 pc/6,600 ly away). The filaments are the remnants of the progenitor star's atmosphere, and consist largely of ionised helium and hydrogen, along with carbon, oxygen, nitrogen, iron, neon and sulfur. The filaments' temperatures are typically between 11,000 and 18,000 K, and their densities are about 1,300 particles per cm^{3}.

In 1953, Iosif Shklovsky proposed that the diffuse blue region is predominantly produced by synchrotron radiation, which is radiation given off by the curving motion of electrons in a magnetic field. The radiation corresponded to electrons moving at speeds up to half the speed of light. Three years later, the hypothesis was confirmed by observations. In the 1960s it was found that the source of the curved paths of the electrons was the strong magnetic field produced by a neutron star at the centre of the nebula.

=== Distance ===
Even though the Crab Nebula is the focus of much attention among astronomers, its distance remains an open question, owing to uncertainties in every method used to estimate its distance. In 2008, the consensus was that its distance from Earth is 2.0 ± 0.5 kpc (6,500 ± 1,600 ly). Along its longest visible dimension, it thus measures about 4.1 ± 1 pc (13 ± 3 ly) across.^{[c]}

The Crab Nebula currently is expanding outward at about 1,500 km/s (930 mi/s). Images taken several years apart reveal the slow expansion of the nebula, and by comparing this angular expansion with its spectroscopically determined expansion velocity, the nebula's distance can be estimated. In 1973, an analysis of many methods used to compute the distance to the nebula had reached a conclusion of about 1.9 kpc (6,300 ly), consistent with the currently cited value.

Tracing back its expansion (assuming a constant decrease of expansion speed due to the nebula's mass) yielded a date for the creation of the nebula several decades after 1054, implying that its outward velocity has decelerated less than assumed since the supernova explosion. This reduced deceleration is believed to be caused by energy from the pulsar that feeds into the nebula's magnetic field, which expands and forces the nebula's filaments outward.

=== Mass ===
Estimates of the total mass of the nebula are important for estimating the mass of the supernova's progenitor star. The amount of matter contained in the Crab Nebula's filaments (ejecta mass of ionized and neutral gas; mostly helium) is estimated to be 4.6±1.8 M_{☉}.

=== Helium-rich torus ===
One of the many nebular components (or anomalies) of the Crab Nebula is a helium-rich torus which is visible as an east–west band crossing the pulsar region. The torus composes about 25% of the visible ejecta. However, it is suggested by calculation that about 95% of the torus is helium. As yet, there has been no plausible explanation put forth for the structure of the torus.

== Central star ==
Slow-motion video of the Crab Pulsar, taken with OES Single-Photon-Camera.

Data from orbiting observatories show unexpected variations in the Crab Nebula's X-ray output, likely tied to the environment around its central neutron star.

NASA's Fermi Gamma-ray Space Telescope spots 'superflares' in the Crab Nebula.

Expansion of the wisps recorded with Hubble between September and November 2005.

At the center of the Crab Nebula are two faint stars, one of which is the star responsible for the existence of the nebula. It was identified as such in 1942, when Rudolf Minkowski found that its optical spectrum was extremely unusual. The region around the star was found to be a strong source of radio waves in 1949 and X-rays in 1963, and was identified as one of the brightest objects in the sky in gamma rays in 1967. Then, in 1968, the star was found to be emitting its radiation in rapid pulses, becoming one of the first pulsars to be discovered.

Pulsars are sources of powerful electromagnetic radiation, emitted in short and extremely regular pulses many times a second. They were a great mystery when discovered in 1967, and the team who identified the first one considered the possibility that it could be a signal from an advanced civilization. However, the discovery of a pulsating radio source in the centre of the Crab Nebula was strong evidence that pulsars were formed by supernova explosions. They now are understood to be rapidly rotating neutron stars, whose powerful magnetic fields concentrates their radiation emissions into narrow beams.

The Crab Pulsar is believed to be about 28–30 km (17–19 mi) in diameter; it emits pulses of radiation every 33 milliseconds. Pulses are emitted at wavelengths across the electromagnetic spectrum, from radio waves to X-rays. Like all isolated pulsars, its period is slowing very gradually. Occasionally, its rotational period shows sharp changes, known as 'glitches', which are believed to be caused by a sudden realignment inside the neutron star. The rate of energy released as the pulsar slows down is enormous, and it powers the emission of the synchrotron radiation of the Crab Nebula, which has a total luminosity about 148,000 times greater than that of the Sun.

The pulsar's extreme energy output creates an unusually dynamic region at the centre of the Crab Nebula. While most astronomical objects evolve so slowly that changes are visible only over timescales of many years, the inner parts of the Crab Nebula show changes over timescales of only a few days. The most dynamic feature in the inner part of the nebula is the point where the pulsar's equatorial wind slams into the bulk of the nebula, forming a shock front. The shape and position of this feature shifts rapidly, with the equatorial wind appearing as a series of wisp-like features that steepen, brighten, then fade as they move away from the pulsar to well out into the main body of the nebula. The wisps expand with a speed of around 50% the speed of light within 2 light-years. Further out the speed decreases and the wisps can merge.

== Progenitor star ==
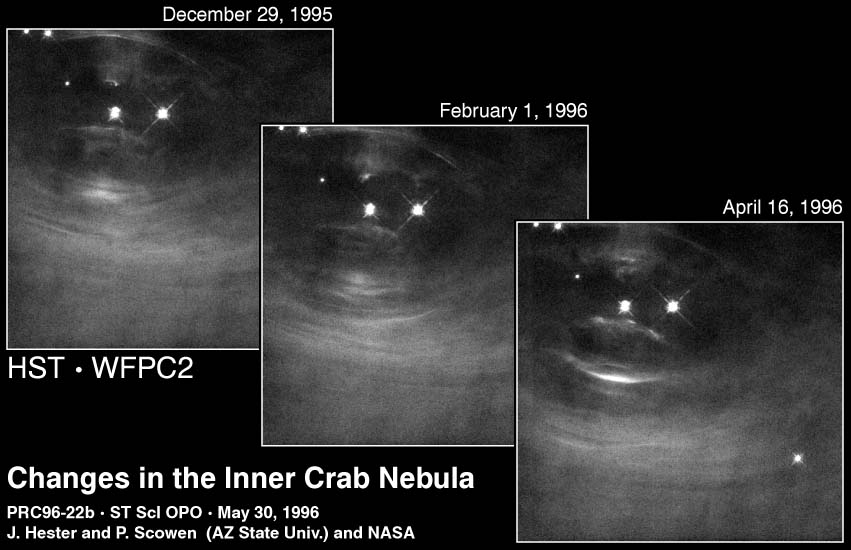
This sequence of Hubble images shows features in the inner Crab Nebula changing over a period of four months.

The star that exploded as a supernova is referred to as the supernova's progenitor star. Two types of stars explode as supernovae: white dwarfs and massive stars. In the so-called Type Ia supernovae, gases falling onto a 'dead' white dwarf raise its mass until it nears a critical level, the Chandrasekhar limit, resulting in a runaway nuclear fusion explosion that obliterates the star; in Type Ib/c and Type II supernovae, the progenitor star is a massive star whose core runs out of fuel to power its nuclear fusion reactions and collapses in on itself, releasing gravitational potential energy in a form that blows away the star's outer layers. Type Ia supernovae do not produce pulsars, so the pulsar in the Crab Nebula shows it must have formed in a core-collapse supernova.

Theoretical models of supernova explosions suggest that the star that exploded to produce the Crab Nebula must have had a mass of between 9 and 11 M_{☉}. Stars with masses lower than 8 M_{☉} are thought to be too small to produce supernova explosions, and end their lives by producing a planetary nebula instead, while a star heavier than 12 M_{☉} would have produced a nebula with a different chemical composition from that observed in the Crab Nebula. Recent studies, however, suggest the progenitor could have been a super-asymptotic giant branch star in the 8 to 10 M_{☉} range that would have exploded in an electron-capture supernova. In June 2021 a paper in the journal Nature Astronomy reported that the 2018 supernova SN 2018zd (in the galaxy NGC 2146, about 31 million light-years from Earth) appeared to be the first observation of an electron-capture supernova The 1054 supernova explosion that created the Crab Nebula had been thought to be the best candidate for an electron-capture supernova, and the 2021 paper makes it more likely that this was correct.

A significant problem in studies of the Crab Nebula is that the combined mass of the nebula and the pulsar add up to considerably less than the predicted mass of the progenitor star, and the question of where the 'missing mass' is, remains unresolved. Estimates of the mass of the nebula are made by measuring the total amount of light emitted, and calculating the mass required, given the measured temperature and density of the nebula. Estimates range from about 1–5 M_{☉}, with 2–3 M_{☉} being the generally accepted value. The neutron star mass is estimated to be between 1.4 and 2 M_{☉}.

The predominant theory to account for the missing mass of the Crab Nebula is that a substantial proportion of the mass of the progenitor was carried away before the supernova explosion in a fast stellar wind, a phenomenon commonly seen in Wolf–Rayet stars. However, this would have created a shell around the nebula. Although attempts have been made at several wavelengths to observe a shell, none has yet been found.

== Transits by Solar System bodies ==
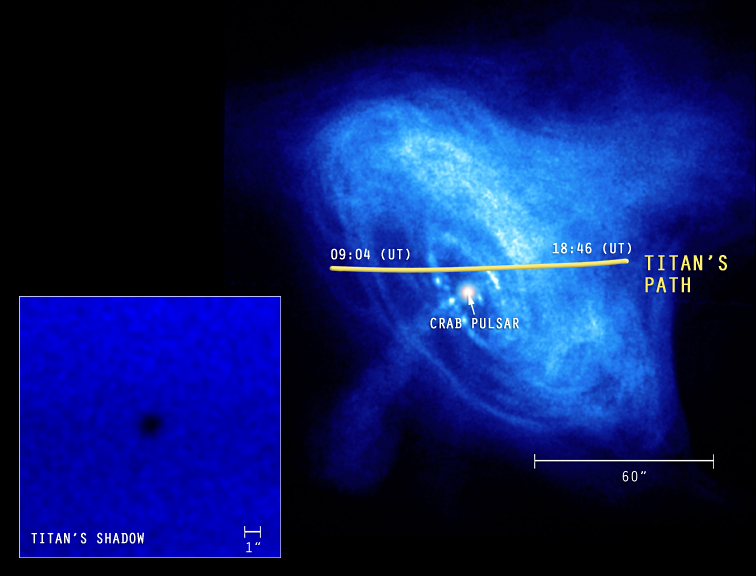
Chandra image showing Saturn's moon Titan transiting the nebula.

The Crab Nebula lies roughly 1.5 degrees away from the ecliptic—the plane of Earth's orbit around the Sun. This means that the Moon—and occasionally, planets—can transit or occult the nebula. Although the Sun does not transit the nebula, its corona passes in front of it. These transits and occultations can be used to analyse both the nebula and the object passing in front of it, by observing how radiation from the nebula is altered by the transiting body.

=== Lunar ===
Lunar transits have been used to map X-ray emissions from the nebula. Before the launch of X-ray-observing satellites, such as the Chandra X-ray Observatory, X-ray observations generally had quite low angular resolution, but when the Moon passes in front of the nebula, its position is very accurately known, and so the variations in the nebula's brightness can be used to create maps of X-ray emission. When X-rays were first observed from the Crab Nebula, a lunar occultation was used to determine the exact location of their source.

=== Solar ===
The Sun's corona passes in front of the Crab Nebula every June. Variations in the radio waves received from the Crab Nebula at this time can be used to infer details about the corona's density and structure. Early observations established that the corona extended out to much greater distances than had previously been thought; later observations found that the corona contained substantial density variations.

=== Other objects ===
Very rarely, Saturn transits the Crab Nebula. Its transit on 4 January 2003 (UTC) was the first since 31 December 1295 (O.S.); another will not occur until 5 August 2267. Researchers used the Chandra X-ray Observatory to observe Saturn's moon Titan as it crossed the nebula, and found that Titan's X-ray 'shadow' was larger than its solid surface, due to absorption of X-rays in its atmosphere. These observations showed that the thickness of Titan's atmosphere is 880 km (550 mi). The transit of Saturn itself could not be observed, because Chandra was passing through the Van Allen belts at the time.

== Gallery ==
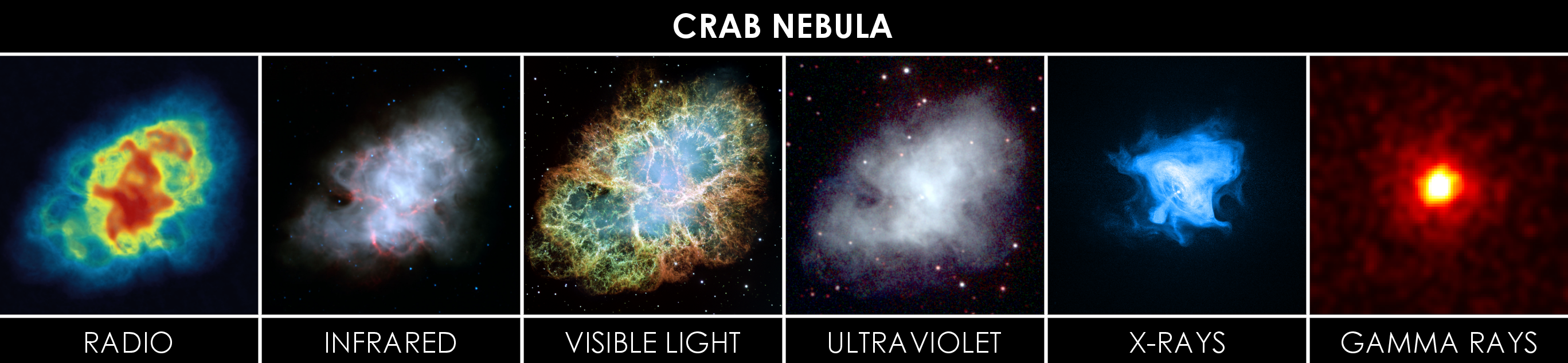
The Crab Nebula seen in radio, infrared, visible light, ultraviolet, X-rays and gamma-rays (8 March 2015)
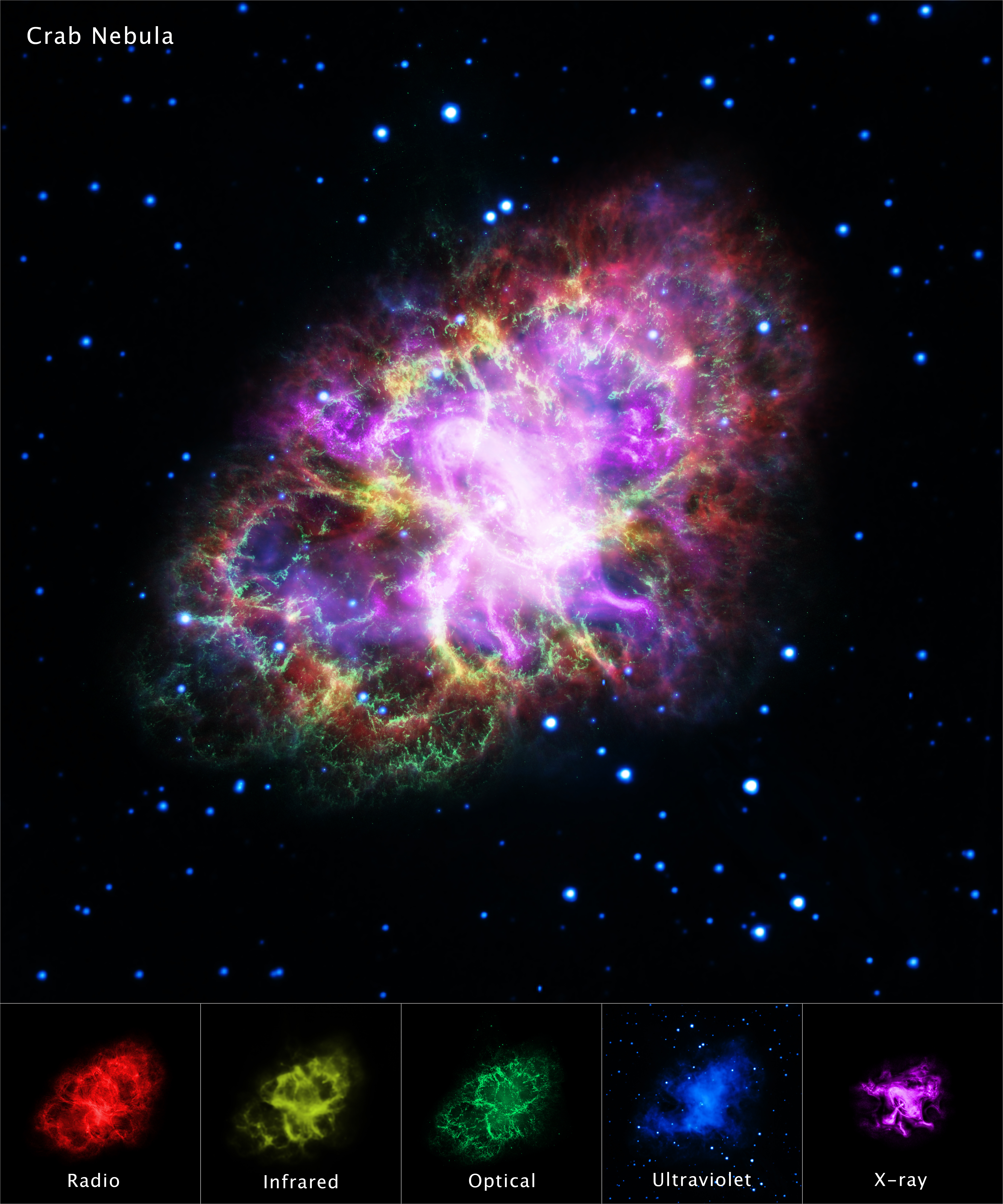
The Crab Nebula – five observatories (10 May 2017)

The Crab Nebula – five observatories (animation; 10 May 2017)

Crab Nebula imaged using James Webb Space Telescope in infrared via its NIRCam (Near-Infrared Camera) and MIRI (Mid-Infrared Instrument). (30 October 2023)
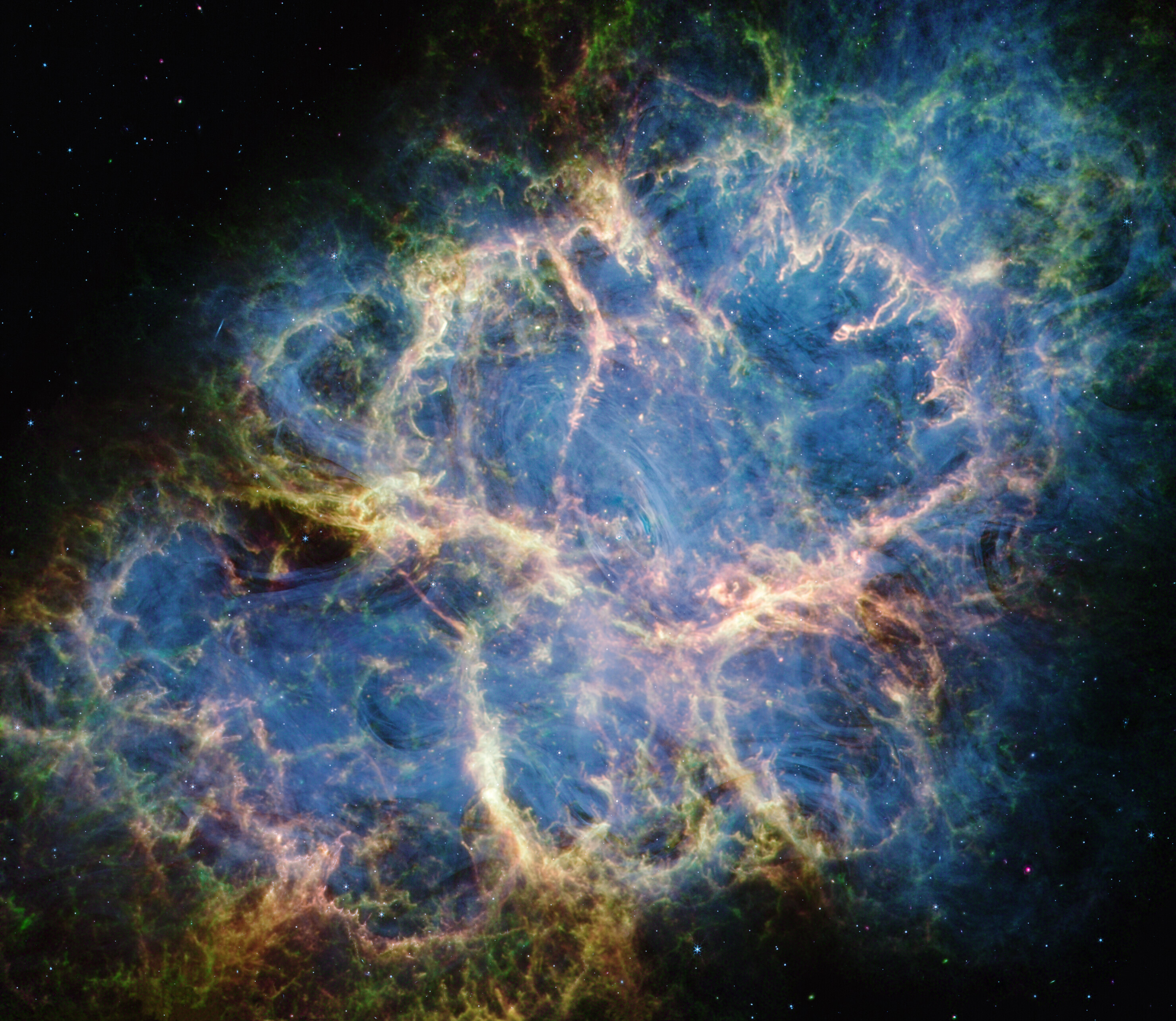
Image of Crab Nebula from JWST

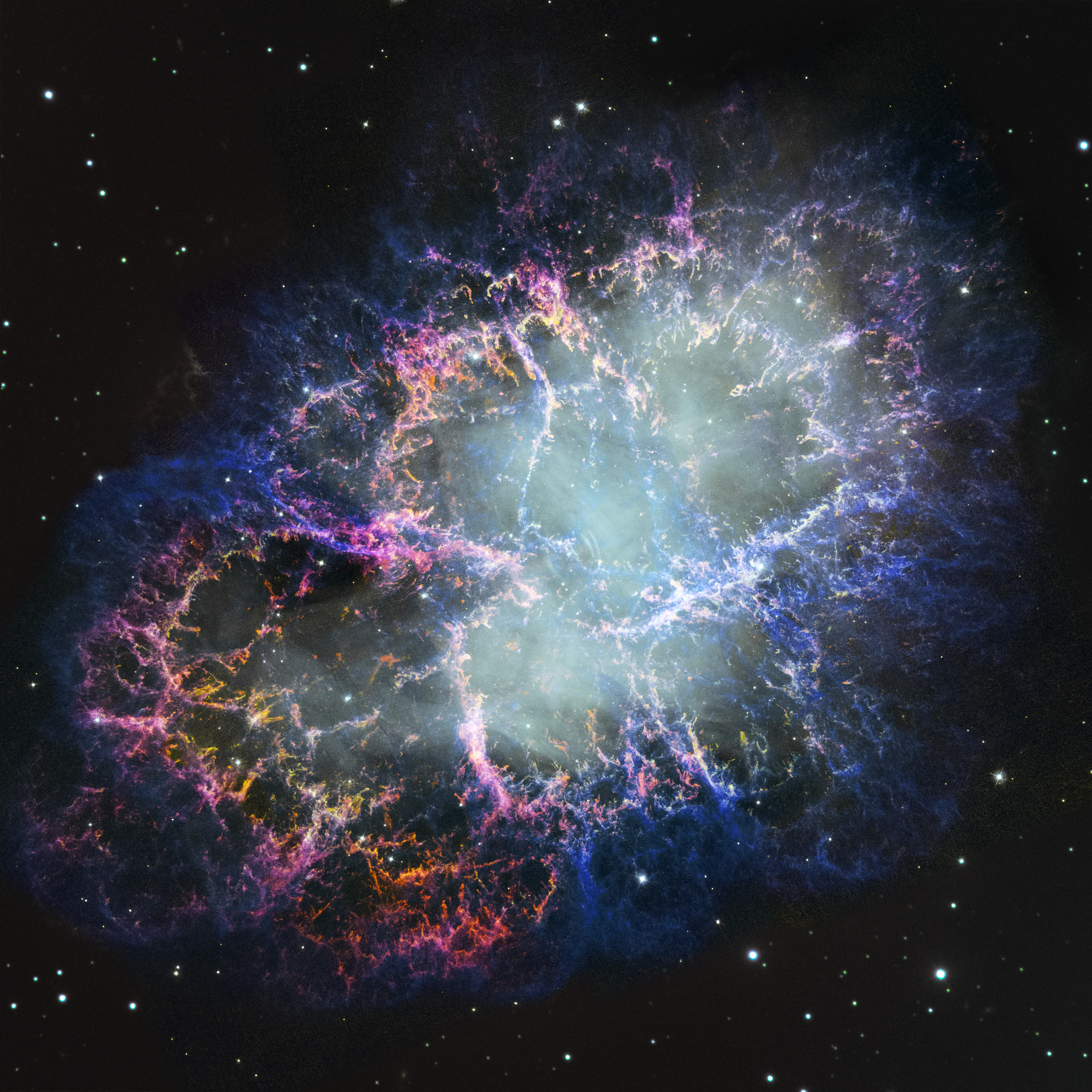
Image of Crab Nebula from HST

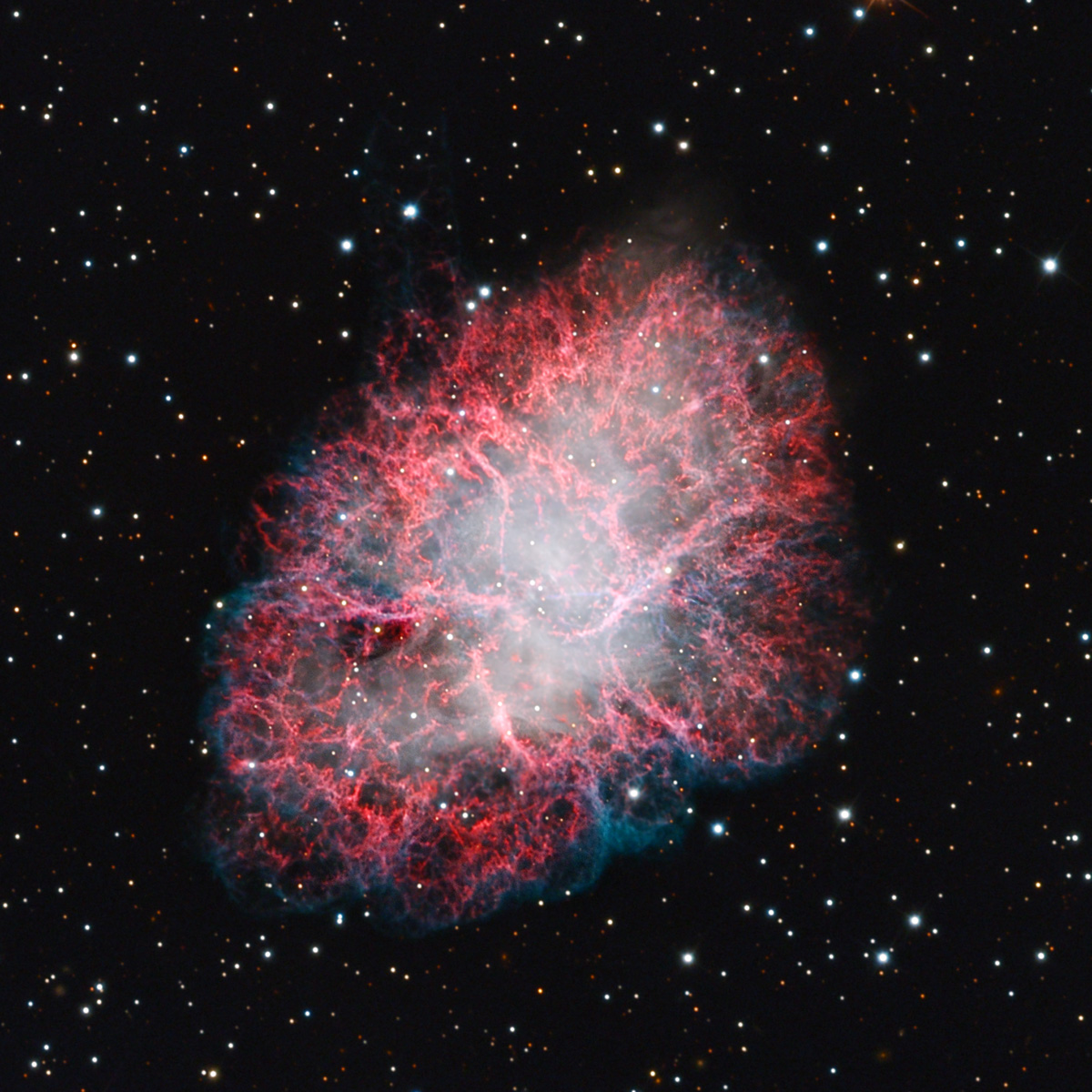
Image of Crab Nebula from Mount Lemmon Observatory

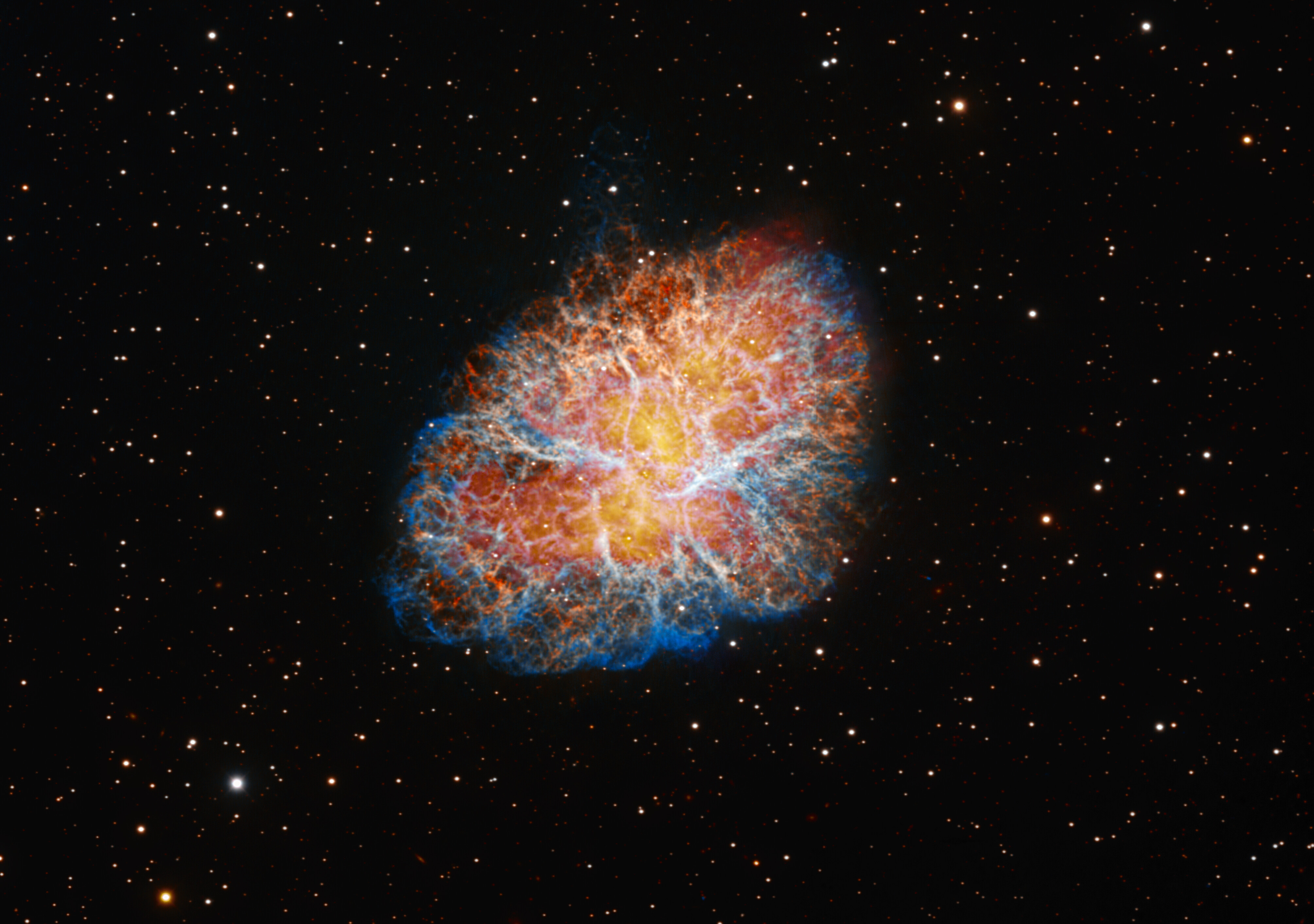
Image of Crab Nebula from KPNO

== See also ==
- Lists of nebulae
- List of Messier objects
- Southern Crab Nebula, so named for its resemblance to the Crab Nebula, but visible from the southern hemisphere
- Galactic anticenter

== Notes ==
1. Size as measured on a very deep plate taken by Sidney van den Bergh in late 1969.
2. Apparent magnitude of 8.4—distance modulus of 11.5±0.5 = −3.1±0.5
3. distance × tan ( diameter_angle = 420″ ) = 4.1±1.0 pc diameter = 13±3-light-year diameter
4. The nature of nebula at the time was unknown.
