= W83 =

W83 may refer to:

- Icosidodecadodecahedron
- Whitin Observatory
