= Leah B. Allen =

American astronomer

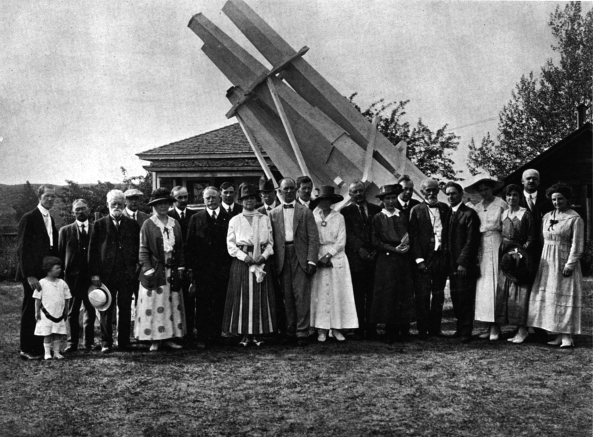
- The Crocker eclipse expedition, 1918. Allen is third from the right.
- Born: November 6, 1884; Providence, Rhode Island
- Died: 1979 (aged 94–95)
- Education: Pembroke College in Brown University, Wellesley College
- Scientific career
- Fields: astronomy
- Workplaces: Lick Observatory, Wellesley College, Hood College
- Thesis: A study of the peculiar spectrum of the star Eta Centauri (1912)

Leah Brown Allen (November 6, 1884 – 1979) was an American astronomer. Allen was Professor of Astronomy and Director of Williams Observatory at Hood College.

== Education and career ==
She attended Hope High School in Providence, graduating in 1903. She then studied at Pembroke College in Brown University, starting later that same year, where she did special work in astronomy (Note: Upton taught an astronomy class called Research Course which was described as: "Special advanced work. Subjects arranged to meet the requirements of individual students. Elective for Graduates and approved Undergraduates.") under Professor Winslow Upton, director of Ladd Observatory. She received an A.B. degree in 1907. Allen joined Lick Observatory as Carnegie Assistant from September 1907 to June 1908 after a recommendation by Upton. At Lick her work as a computer involved "...duties in the measurement and reduction of spectrograms." In 1910 she became an assistant in astronomy at Wellesley College. She received her M.A. from Wellesley in 1912. Her thesis was a spectroscopic study of the star Eta Centauri. Allen participated in Lick Observatory's Crocker expedition to view the total solar eclipse of June 8, 1918 at Goldendale, Washington. She was an assistant professor of astronomy at Wellesley, along with astronomy instructor Lois Tripp Slocum, in the 1920s. She was affiliated with the Whitin Observatory at Wellesley. Allen began teaching astronomy at Hood in 1927. At Hood she was director of the John H. Williams Observatory. She gave lectures to amateur astronomy groups. She retired from teaching in 1955. Allen died in 1979.

== Personal life ==
Allen was the daughter of Samuel F. Allen, who had been described as a "veteran balloonist." Her mother was Abby Lydia Allen, née Willey.

She enjoyed sailing from the time that she was in college. Her sister considered her an expert at handling her sailboat in inclement weather.

She became active in the women's suffrage movement after reading a speech by her sister, called “Why Women Should Be Given the Vote.” She was an advocate of voting rights, and played a role in earning women the right to vote in Rhode Island.

== Honors and memberships ==
This prize is named in her honor:

- Leah B. Allen Award for work in astronomy or mathematics, Hood College

Allen was a member of the following societies:

- American Astronomical Society
- American Association of Variable Star Observers, Charter Member

== Correspondents ==
- Annie Jump Cannon
- William F. Meggers

== Publications ==
- Allen, Leah B. "Study of η Centauri" (1911) [Manuscript]. Project PHAEDRA: Preserving Harvard's Early Data and Research in Astronomy, ID: KG11365.685, pp. 1–50. Harvard College Observatory.
- Allen, Leah B. (1912). A study of the peculiar spectrum of the star Eta Centauri (Masters thesis). Wellesley College.
- Campbell, W.W.; Boothroyd, S.L.; Curtis, H.D.; Hoover, J.E.; Allen, Leah B.; et al. (August 1918). "The Crocker eclipse expedition from the Lick Observatory, University of California: June 8, 1918". Publications of the Astronomical Society of the Pacific. 30 (176): 219–240. Bibcode:1918PASP...30..219C. doi:10.1086/122736. JSTOR 40710021.
- Allen, Leah B. (October 1918). "Absorption lines in the spectrum of Nova Aquilae, No. 3". Publications of the Astronomical Society of the Pacific. 30 (177): 308–310. Bibcode:1918PASP...30..308A. doi:10.1086/122760. JSTOR 40710143.
- Allen, Leah B. (1923). "Notes from 'The stone of the sun and the first chapter of the history of Mexico'". Popular Astronomy. 31 (640): 640–641. Bibcode:1923PA.....31..640A.
- Allen, Leah B. (1925). "The radial velocities of twenty southern variable stars of class Me". Lick Observatory Bulletin. 369: 71–73. Bibcode:1925LicOB..12...71A. doi:10.5479/ADS/bib/1925LicOB.12.71A.
- Duncan, John C.; Allen, Leah B. (1927). "A new celestial globe for the use of students". Publications of the American Astronomical Society. 5: 145–146. Bibcode:1927PAAS....5..145D.
- Allen, Leah B.; Marsh, Franklin F. (August 1932). "Photographic light curves of RR Leonis and V Leonis Minoris". Harvard College Observatory Bulletin. 888: 19–22. Bibcode:1932BHarO.888...19A.
- Allen, Leah B. (1951). "Committee on Teaching of Science". Popular Astronomy. 59: 53. Bibcode:1951PA.....59...53A.
- Shapley, Harlow; Allen, Leah B.; Greenstein, Naomi (August 1954). "New variable stars in Centaurus". Astronomical Journal. 59 (1219): 270–271. Bibcode:1954AJ.....59..270S. doi:10.1086/107011.
