= Whitin Observatory =

Observatory in Massachusetts, US

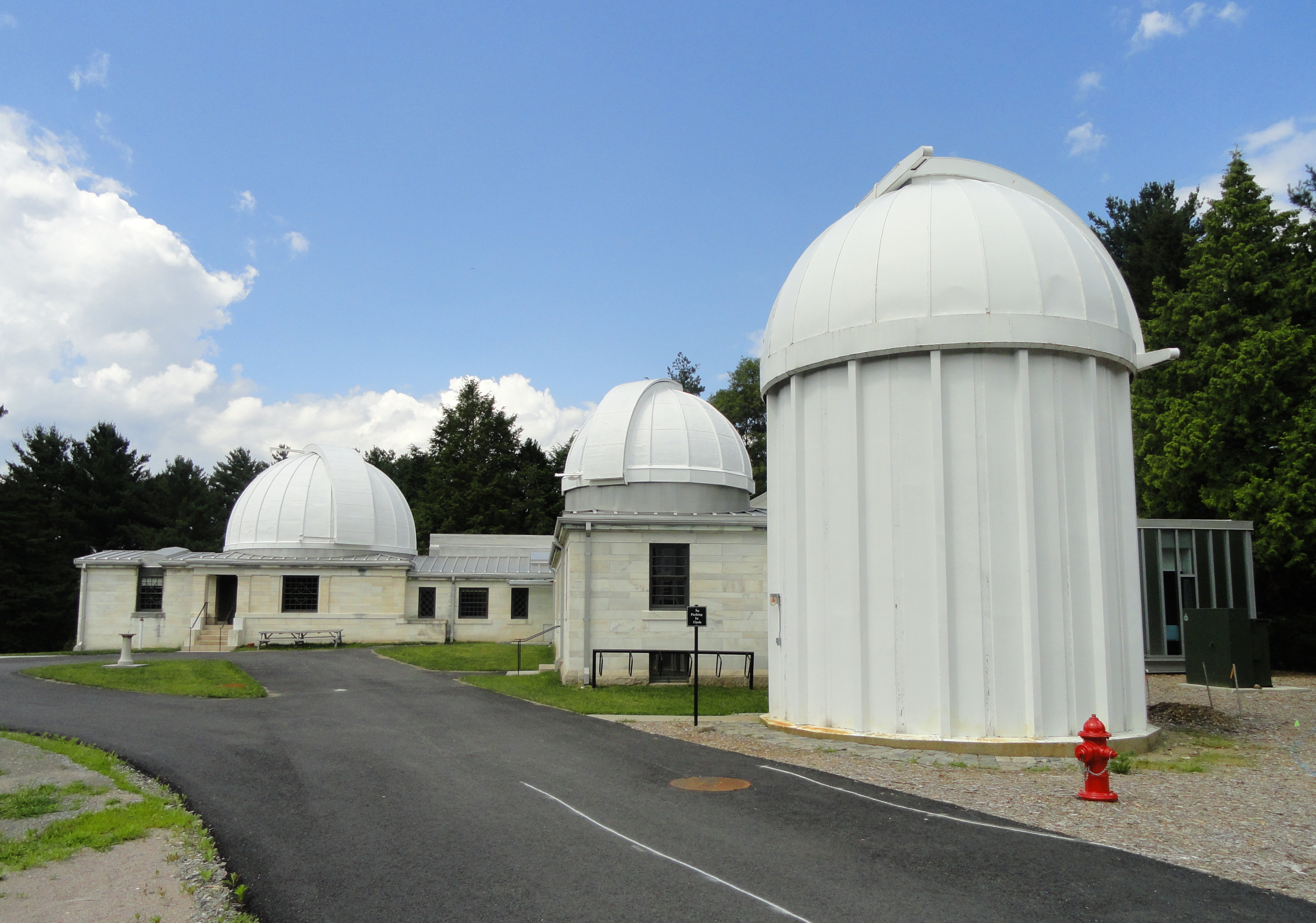
- Whitin Observatory
- Observatory code: W83
- Location: Massachusetts
- Coordinates: 42°17′42″N 71°18′11″W
- Related media on Commons

Whitin Observatory is an astronomical observatory owned and operated by Wellesley College. Built in 1900, with additions in 1906, 1967, and 2010, it is located in Wellesley, Massachusetts and named after Wellesley College trustee Mrs. John Crane Whitin (Sarah Elizabeth Whitin) of Whitinsville, who donated the funds for the observatory. Astronomer Sarah Frances Whiting was the first director of the new Wellesley College Astronomy Department.

The facilities include a 0.7m PlaneWave CDK700 reflector, a 12" Fitz/Clark refractor, a 6" Alvan Clark refractor, a Hale Spectrohelioscope, and Meade 8" SCTs.

== History ==
In 1896, Wellesley College physics professor Sarah Frances Whiting met trustee Sarah Elizabeth Whitin at a traditional college ceremony, "Float Night." The conversation turned to a 12" refracting telescope Whiting had used that was being offered for sale, and as told in Wellesley College 1875–1975: A Century of Women:

In the fall of 1898 she proposed to give, and the Trustees "voted to accept with gratitude," "a 12" telescope and a simple building to house the instrument." Then at a Trustees meeting the following May, "Mrs. Whitin stated that she now proposes to construct the Observatory of white marble in place of brick." When it was formally opened on October 8, 1900, Miss Hazard could report that it housed "a 12" refractor with micrometer, polarizing photometer, and star and sun spectroscopes. A Rowland concave grating spectroscope, of 6' focus, with its accompanying heliostat, is set up in a room capable of being darkened completely. The library is a beautiful room, and the dome by Warner and Swasey is all that it should be.

Whiting used the telescope in teaching her classes in astronomy to Wellesley students, one of the first of its kind. It quickly became apparent that the Observatory would need to be expanded. Sarah Frances Whiting wrote in Whitin's obituary "An Appreciation," which appeared in The Wellesley College News

I knew from the first that it was not large enough for the kind of work we wished to do, and that the nearest college residence hall was too far off for the astronomical staff to be present for the nightly vigil with the stars. Mrs. Whitin herself soon perceived this and of her own initiative began to think of an Observatory House, and an enlargement to the Observatory itself. The beauty and costliness of what was already done seemed difficult to match. Various compromise building materials for the addition were discussed, but after many consultations with the architect, she declared that "marble and copper were good enough," and by 1906 the observatory was doubled with increased equipment, and a house placed beside it, completing a harmonious group, and itself a lovely specimen of domestic architecture.

According to Wellesley records, in 1942, before the U.S. entered World War II, "astronomy professor Helen Dodson and Barbara McCarthy, professor of Greek, teach a secret course in cryptography to (at least) ten students. The course was taught evenings at the Observatory, where late-night activity would not attract attention. Following graduation, most of these students went on to work for the [U.S. Navy] WAVES (Women Accepted for Volunteer Emergency Service), working on Japanese and German codes."

== Faculty ==
- Leah B. Allen
- John Charles Duncan
- Ellen Amanda Hayes
- Sarah Frances Whiting

== Students ==
- Annie Jump Cannon, after whom the Annie J. Cannon Award in Astronomy was named.
- Andrea Dupree
- Martha P. Haynes
- Nergis Mavalvala
- Pamela Melroy
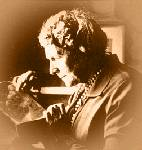
Annie Jump Cannon

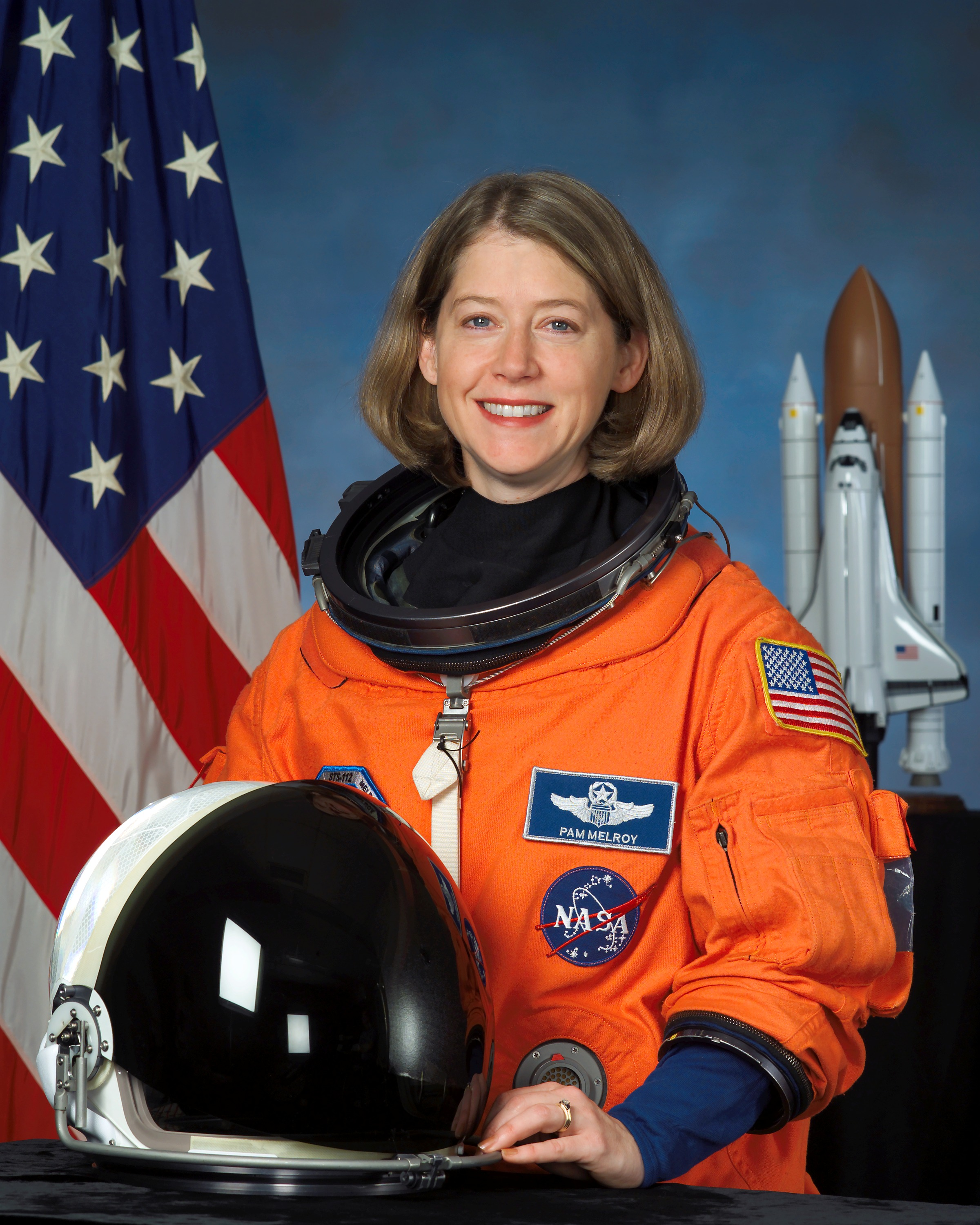
Astronaut Pam Melroy

== Friends ==
- Margaret Lindsay Huggins, who bequeathed items to the observatory
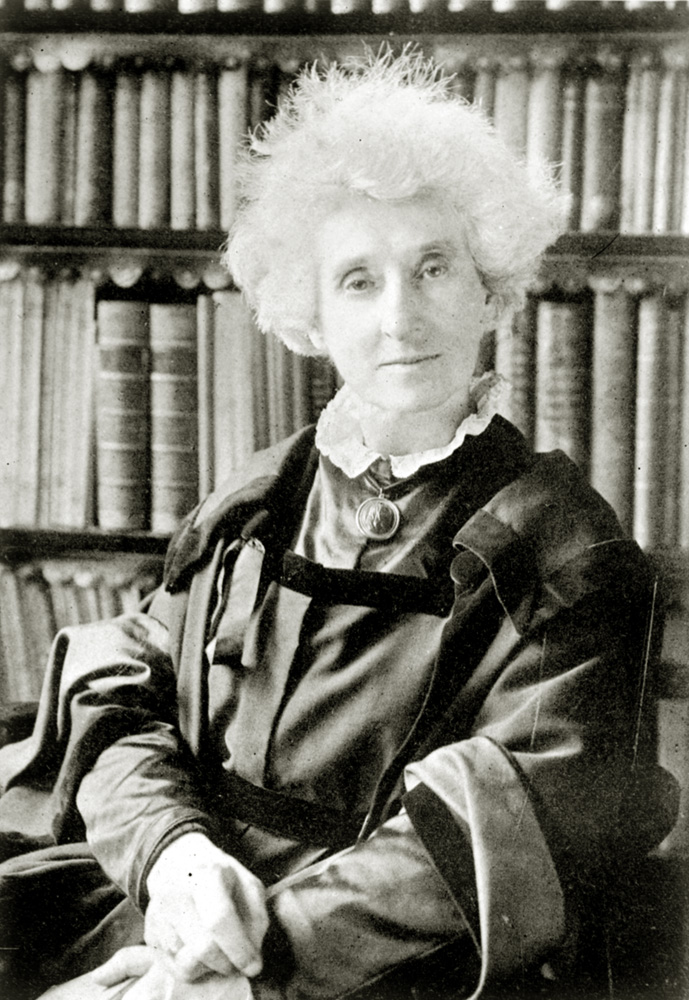
Lady Margaret Lindsay Huggins

== See also ==
- List of astronomical observatories
