= John Charles Duncan =

American astronomer (1882–1967)

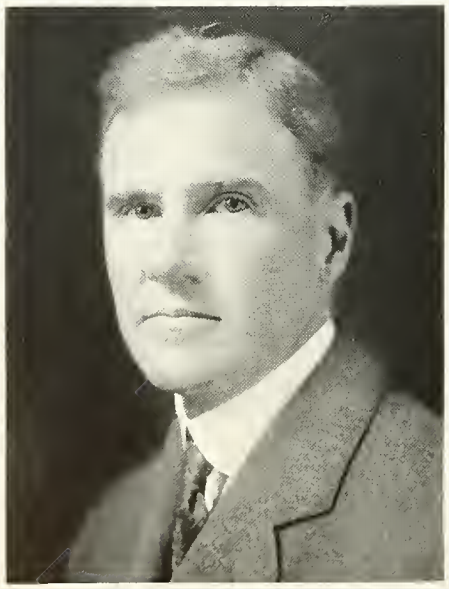
- As Wellesley College Professor of Astronomy in 1932
- Born: February 8, 1882; Knightstown, Indiana, US
- Died: September 10, 1967 (aged 85); Chula Vista, California, US
- Resting place: Crown Hill Cemetery and Arboretum, Section 1, Lot 34
- Education: Indiana University Bloomington; University of California, Berkeley
- Scientific career
- Fields: Astronomy
- Workplaces: University of Arizona; Harvard University; Radcliffe College; Wellesley College
- Thesis: The Orbits of the Cepheid Variables Y Sagittarii and RT Aurigae; with a Discussion of the Possible Causes of this Type of Stellar Variation (1909)
- Doctoral advisor: William Wallace Campbell

Signature
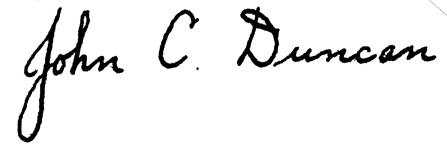

John Charles Duncan (February 8, 1882 – September 10, 1967) was an American astronomer. His work spanned astronomy's transition from a focus on observation and location measurement to astrophysics. He was well known for his basic college textbook "Astronomy", in widespread use for 30 years after its first publication in 1926. His career was a fruitful combination of research and teaching at major observatories, in his own classrooms and through his textbook. Duncan was the first to note the expansion of the Crab Nebula and from that determine the approximate year of its creation, discovered variable stars in what were soon found to be distant galaxies, and describe the nebular structures now known as the Pillars of Creation.

== Early life ==
John Charles Duncan was born at home at Duncan's Mill, near Knightstown, Ind., on Feb. 8, 1882. He was the third child of Daniel Davidson and Naomi Jessup Duncan.

Daniel was born in Ohio in 1844, the family settling in Henry County, Indiana in 1856. During the Civil War he served briefly as a private in Company A, 105th Indiana Infantry, which was organized to repel Morgan's Raid. With his father Samuel he was a flour miller at S. & D.D. Duncan, 3 miles northeast of Knightstown on the Big Blue River. After Samuel died, the firm became D.D. Duncan, and later Duncan's Mill. Naomi was born in 1842 in Henry County, the daughter of a Quaker family.

== Education ==
Duncan graduated from Knightstown High School in 1899, at a time when the graduation rate of American 17 year olds was 6.4%.

Duncan studied astronomy at Indiana University, Bloomington, and earned an A.B. degree in 1905 from the School of Mechanics and Astronomy.

Upon graduation, he was awarded a Lawrence Fellowship for students of astronomy, which entitled him to spend one year in the Flagstaff observatory in Arizona while he pursued a master's degree. The fellowship was a result of Percival Lowell's search for Planet X. He hoped find it by means of a broad-brush photographic search of the sky along the ecliptic. For this purpose, John and two other Indiana University graduates were assigned to photograph the sky. By the time the fellowship was discontinued, in September 1907, no planet had been found.

Based on his work at Lowell Observatory, he received his master's degree in 1906 and taught for a year in Indiana University.

In 1907, he enrolled at the University of California, studying under a fellowship at Lick Observatory. He received a Ph.D. in 1909. His dissertation was published as “The Orbits of the Cepheid Variables Y Sagittarii and RT Aurigae; with a Discussion of the Possible Causes of This Type of Stellar Variation,” in Lick Observatory Bulletin, 5 (1908–1910), 82–94, written under the direction of William Wallace Campbell.

Duncan's educational experience provided an example for a successful contemporary doctoral candidate. Writing to Campbell concerning a fellowship to work on a Ph.D. at Berkeley, Duncan included a summary of his undergraduate and graduate work at Indiana. This included:

- Fifty-two hours in astronomy including descriptive astronomy, celestial mechanics, theory of orbits, least squares and practical observatory work with a 12-inch refractor, transit circle and photographic camera, as well as a 15-inch reflector.
- Thirty hours of physics, including spectroscopy using a 4-inch diffraction grating ruled in the laboratory of Henry Rowland at Johns Hopkins.
- Twenty-eight hours of mathematics through differential equations.
- An introductory chemistry course
- Extensive work in French and German.
- English literature and composition.
- A master's degree on the strength of his experience at Lowell Observatory.

Duncan had studied celestial mechanics using the latest texts by University of Chicago professor Forest Ray Moulton (1872–1952) and Félix Tisserand (1854–96), of the Paris Observatory.

== Career ==
Duncan's chief contribution to astronomy was his photographic demonstration of expansion in the Crab nebula. He is perhaps better known, however, as the author of Astronomy, a standard college textbook for over thirty years, which was illustrated with many of his own photographs of nebulae and galaxies.

In the 1900 US Census, 18 year old John C. Duncan is listed among family members as a salesman (perhaps for the flour mill) and a "comer" (upstart), perhaps reflecting his recent high school graduation.

During his undergraduate studies 1901 to 1903, Duncan was also a country school teacher in Indiana. Duncan taught at Indiana University in 1904-05 and acted as and observatory assistant in the Department of Mechanics and Astronomy. Dr. Duncan subsequently spent a year at Flagstaff at Lowell Observatory as a Lawrence Fellow. He was also a fellow at the Lick Observatory from 1907 to 1909.

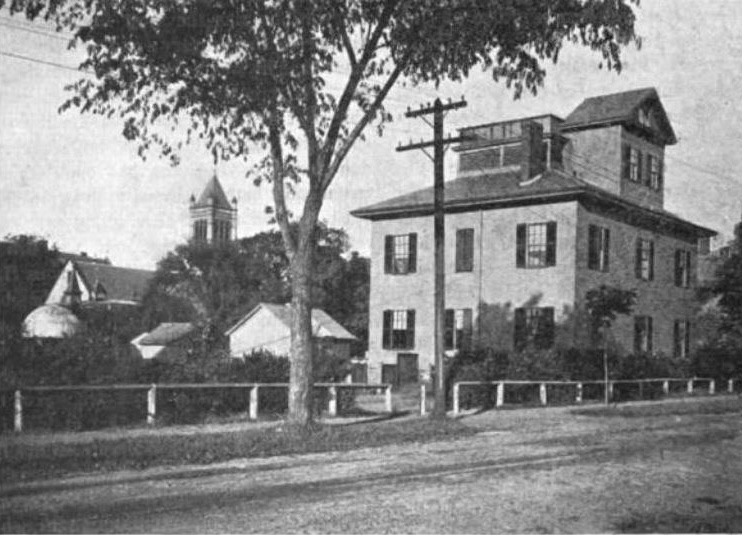
The Harvard Students Astronomical Laboratory, where Dr. Duncan was an instructor, c. 1911.

After receiving his doctorate, he returned to the East, serving as instructor in astronomy at Harvard University from 1909 to 1916, and Radcliffe College, 1911–16. He became professor of astronomy and director of Whitin Observatory at Wellesley College in 1916, taking over from Dr. Sarah Frances Whiting upon her retirement, positions he held until his own retirement from full-time work in 1950.

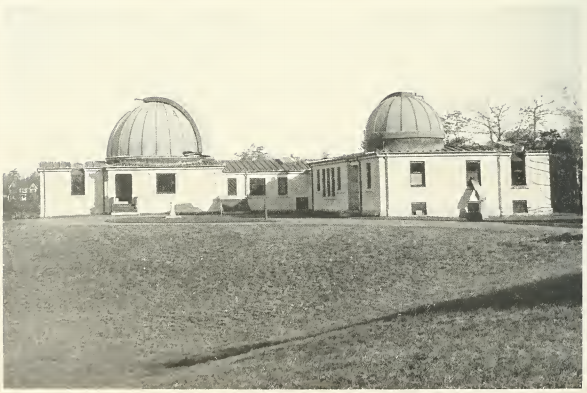
Whitin Observatory at Wellesley College, c. 1935.

In 1923, reflecting increased awareness of the need to integrate spectroscopy early on in the astronomy curriculum, Dr. Duncan together with Professor H.T. Stetson issued an astronomical laboratory handbook that included a short discussion of the ‘‘principles of spectroscopy,’’ grating and prism spectroscopes and the classification of stellar spectra. This prepared students for the succeeding specialized course in Elementary Astrophysics also taught by Stetson every other year.

The underlying reason for this shift in the curriculum was the rise in spectroscopy theory alongside quantum theory and quantum mechanics. In addition to rotational and relative stellar velocity, spectra became indicators of electron transitions between states whose energy level could be precisely calculated. This provided the basis for the transition of new astronomers from measurement takers to physicists at their core.

Duncan finished his career as a visiting professor at the University of Arizona, a position he held until 1962.

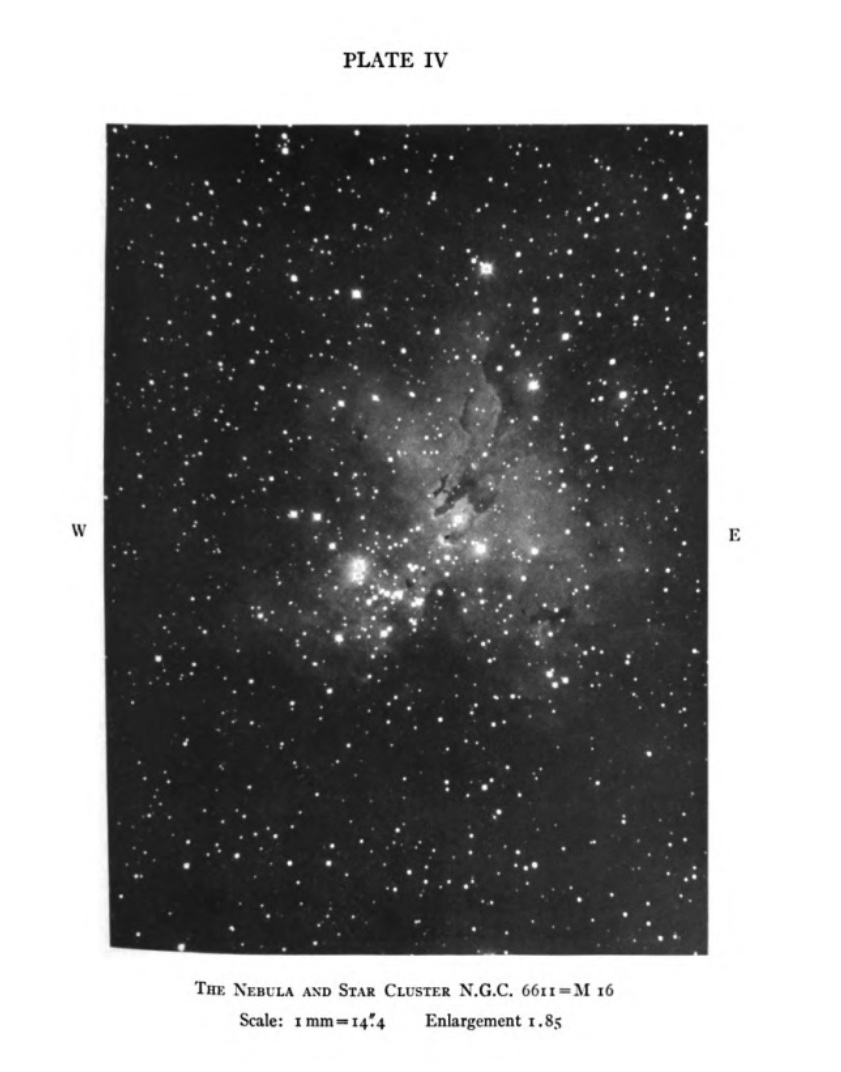
The Nebula and Star Cluster N.G.C. 6611 = M 16 (Eagle Nebula), Photographed with the 60-inch Reflector at Mount Wilson Observatory, August 25–26, 1919.

He was a visiting astronomer at Mount Wilson Observatory in 1920 to 21, and a summer voluntary research assistant there from 1922 to 1949. Among the many images he collected during his initial time with the 100 inch Hooker Telescope, his photograph of the Horsehead Nebula was long considered the definitive example, and he apparently was first to coin its popular name in the first edition of his astronomy textbook in 1926.

For his June 27, 1919 photograph of the Eagle Nebula, he provided the first published description of the structures now known as the Pillars of Creation.

His many research papers included his work on the Crab nebula appeared as “Changes Observed in the Crab Nebula in Taurus,” in Proceedings of the National Academy of Sciences, 7 (1921), 179–180; and as “Second Report on the Expansion of the Crab Nebula,” in Astrophysical Journal, 89 (1939), 482–485. Reproductions and descriptions of the best of Duncan's photographs are contained in six papers: “Bright Nebulae and Star Clusters in Sagittarius and Scutum,” in Astrophysical Journal, 51 (1920), 4–12, with 4 plates; “Bright and Dark Nebulae near ζ Orionis, Photographed with the 100-inch Hooker Telescope,” ibid., 53 (1921), 392–396, with 2 plates; “Photographic Studies of Nebulae, Third Paper,” ibid., 57 (1923), 137–148, with 11 plates; “Photographic Studies of Nebulae, Fourth Paper,” ibid., 63 (1926), 122–126, with 4 plates; “Photographic Studies of Nebulae, Fifth Paper,” ibid, 86 (1937), 496–498, with 6 plates; and “Photographic Studies of Nebulae VI. The Great Nebulous Region in Cygnus Photographed in Red Light,” ibid., 109 (1949), 479, with 2 plates.

== Discoveries ==
=== Variable stars in distant galaxies ===
Using the 100-inch and 60-inch Mount Wilson Observatory telescopes, Duncan, by then director of the Wellesley College Observatory, first spotted a variable in what was then called the spiral nebulae M31 in 1922, and three variables within the area covered by the M33 nebulae in 1925. In 1926 Edwin Hubble was able to determine that these stars were classical Cepheids, which allowed him to estimate their distance. The results of this supported the concept that spiral nebulae were galaxies in their own right, rather than clouds within the Milky Way.

=== Expansion of the Crab Nebula ===
Dr. Duncan compared photographic plates taken 11.5 years apart, and found that the Crab Nebula was expanding at an average of about 0.2 seconds of arc per year, beginning roughly 900 years before.

=== Supernova spectroscopy ===
In the four decades from 1896 to 1936 only three supernovae were observed spectroscopically: George W. Ritchey, with the assistance of Francis Pease, observed a faint supernova in a spiral galaxy, NGC6946, in 1917 and obtained an objective prism plate. In 1926 another faint supernova in a spiral system was observed both at Lick Observatory by Donald Shane and at Mt Wilson by Duncan and Seth Barnes Nicholson.

== Personal life ==
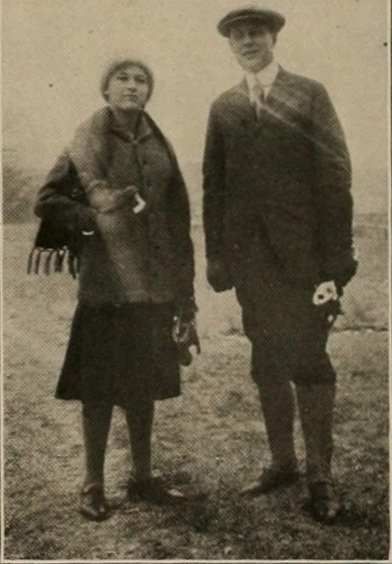
Katherine and John Duncan, c. 1920

Duncan married Katharine Armington Bullard on Dec. 29, 1906. They had one daughter, Eunice Naomi.

Katharine was born on 31 August 1879, in Indianapolis, graduated from a Quaker secondary academy, and from the normal college in Flagstaff, Arizona. During her senior year in Flagstaff, she met her future husband, tutoring him in Spanish. She died on 21 September 1952, in Tucson, Arizona at the age of 73.

Upon his death in 1967, John C. Duncan's survivors included his daughter, two grandchildren, and three great-grandchildren.

== Honors ==
Duncan was a Fellow of the Royal Astronomical Society and the American Astronomical Society (as Secretary of the later from 1936 to 1939), as well as a member of the International Astronomical Union, and since 1938 the American Association for the Advancement of Science, the American Academy of Arts and Sciences and numerous other scientific organizations. The asteroid 2753 Duncan, discovered on 18 February 1966 at the Goethe Link Observatory, was named after him.

== See also ==
- Edwin Hubble
- Percival Lowell
- Carl Otto Lampland
- Crab Nebula
- Triangulum Galaxy (M33)
- Whitin Observatory
- Mount Wilson Observatory
- Lowell Observatory

== Bibliography ==
=== Books ===
- John Charles Duncan (1942). Essentials of Astronomy. New York: Harper & Brothers. Bibcode:1942esas.book.....D. LCCN 42-15656.
- John Charles Duncan (1938). Essco Star Catalog, Epoch 1950. Boston: Eastern Science Supply Company.
- John Charles Duncan (1927) [1st ed. 1927, 2nd 1930, 3rd 1935, 4th 1946, 5th 1955]. Astronomy: A Text Book. London & New York: Harper & Brothers. LCCN 26-23135.
- Stetson, Harlan True; Duncan, John Charles (1925). A Manual of Laboratory Astronomy for use in Introductory Courses (3 ed.). Boston: Eastern Science Supply Company. OCLC 950564298.

=== Articles ===
- Duncan, John C. (May 1952). "Cogshall, W. A.". Sky and Telescope. Vol. 11. p. 161. Bibcode:1952S&T....11..161D.
- Duncan, John C. (1949). "Messier's Nebulae and Star Clusters". Astronomical Society of the Pacific Leaflets. Vol. 5, no. 240. p. 328. Bibcode:1949ASPL....5..328D.
- Duncan, John C. (October 1942). "The Crab Nebula". Sky and Telescope. Vol. 1, no. 12. p. 3. Bibcode:1942S&T.....1....3D.
- Duncan, John C. (1940). "The Constellation Cygnus". Astronomical Society of the Pacific Leaflets. Vol. 3, no. 140. p. 309. Bibcode:1940ASPL....3..309D.
- Duncan, John C. (April 1936). "Equipment for the Visual Study of the Sun at Whitin Observatory". Popular Astronomy. Vol. 44, no. 4. pp. 203–204. Bibcode:1936PA.....44..203D.
- Duncan, John C. (1929). "The nebulous wreath near η Cygni (abstract)". Popular Astronomy. Vol. 37. p. 580. Bibcode:1929PA.....37Q.580D.
- Duncan, John C. (1926). "Some nebulae recently photographed with the 100-inch Hooker telescope (abstract)". Popular Astronomy. Vol. 34. p. 186. Bibcode:1926PA.....34..186D.
- Catlett, Fanny B; Duncan, John C. (1925). "An Interesting Observation of the Shadow-Bands at the Eclipse of 1925". Popular Astronomy. Vol. 33. p. 415. Bibcode:1925PA.....33..415C.
- Duncan, John C. (1919). "Moon's orbit as an elementary exercise". Popular Astronomy. Vol. 27. p. 269. Bibcode:1919PA.....27..269D.
- Duncan, John C. (1919). "Mythology of the Constellations (a poem)". Popular Astronomy. Vol. 27. p. 268. Bibcode:1919PA.....27..268D.
- Duncan, John C. (1919). "The globular cluster Messier 22 (N. G. C. 6656) (abstract)". Popular Astronomy. Vol. 27. p. 100. Bibcode:1919PA.....27..100D.
- Duncan, John C. (1918). "The bright Aurora of 1918, March 7". Popular Astronomy. Vol. 26. p. 350. Bibcode:1918PA.....26R.350D.
- Duncan, John C. (1918). "Aurora of April 5". Popular Astronomy. Vol. 26. p. 350. Bibcode:1918PA.....26Q.350D.
- Duncan, John C. (1918). "The Aurora of May 16, 1918". Popular Astronomy. Vol. 26. p. 506. Bibcode:1918PA.....26..506D.
- Duncan, John C. (1906). "Jupiter casting a Shadow". Popular Astronomy. Vol. 14. p. 123. Bibcode:1906PA.....14..123D.

=== Scientific papers ===
- Duncan, John C. (December 1956). "Lampland's Study of Hubble's Variable Nebula, NGC 2261". Publications of the Astronomical Society of the Pacific. 68 (405): 517. Bibcode:1956PASP...68..517D. doi:10.1086/126989.
- Duncan, J. C. (December 1952). "Carl Otto Lampland". Publications of the Astronomical Society of the Pacific. 64 (381): 293. Bibcode:1952PASP...64..293D. doi:10.1086/126497.
- Duncan, John C. (September 1949). "Galactic nebulae photographed in red light". Astronomical Journal. 54: 184. Bibcode:1949AJ.....54..184D. doi:10.1086/106253.
- Duncan, John C. (1949). "No. 759. Photographic studies of nebulae. VI. The great nebulous region in Cygnus photographed in red light". Contributions from the Mount Wilson Observatory / Carnegie Institution of Washington. 759: 1. Bibcode:1949CMWCI.759....1D. "The nebulous region in Cygnus photographed with the 18-inch Schmidt camera is illustrated and described"
- Duncan, John C. (August 1946). "Photographs of Two Great Southern Galaxies". Publications of the Astronomical Society of the Pacific. 58 (343): 233. Bibcode:1946PASP...58..233D. doi:10.1086/125822.
- Duncan, John C. (July 1946). "Photographs of two great southern galaxies". Astronomical Journal. 52: 42. Bibcode:1946AJ.....52...42D. doi:10.1086/105898.
- Duncan, John C. (1946). "Red nebulae in the tail of Scorpio". Publications of the American Astronomical Society. 10: 48. Bibcode:1946PAAS...10S..48D.
- Duncan, John C. (May 1939). "Second Report on the Expansion of the Crab Nebula". Astrophysical Journal. 89: 482. Bibcode:1939ApJ....89..482D. doi:10.1086/144069. "The expansion of the Crab nebula, revealed in 1921 by a comparison of the positions of twelve nebulous points on photographs made with the 6o-inch telescope with an interval of 11.5 years, is revisited after an interval of another 29.1 years."
- Duncan, John C. (1939). "Celestial photographs in color". Publications of the American Astronomical Society. 9: 259. Bibcode:1939PAAS....9R.259D.
- Duncan, John C. (1939). "Photographic studies of planetary nebulae". Publications of the American Astronomical Society. 9: 37. Bibcode:1939PAAS....9...37D.
- Duncan, John C. (1937). "Photographic Studies of Nebulae. Fifth Paper". Astrophysical Journal. 86: 496. Bibcode:1937ApJ....86..496D. doi:10.1086/143883.
- Duncan, John C. (November 1936). "Photographic observations of Nova Lacertae 1936". Astronomical Journal. 45 (1055): 192. Bibcode:1936AJ.....45..192D. doi:10.1086/105371.
- Duncan, J. C. (1936). "Discovery of faint envelope around bright planetary nebula NGC 6826 Cygni". Publications of the American Astronomical Society. 8: 241. Bibcode:1936PAAS....8..241D.
- Duncan, J. C. (1936). "New information on the ring nebula in Lyra". Publications of the American Astronomical Society. 8: 141. Bibcode:1936PAAS....8..141D.
- Duncan, J. C. (1935). "A Faint Envelope around the Ring Nebula in Lyra". Publications of the Astronomical Society of the Pacific. 47 (279): 271–272. Bibcode:1935PASP...47..271D. doi:10.1086/124611.
- Duncan, J. C. (1932). "The Period and Velocity Curve of X Sagittarii". Publications of the Astronomical Society of the Pacific. 44 (261): 261. Bibcode:1932PASP...44..324D. doi:10.1086/124257.
- Duncan, J. C. (1931). "The nebulous wreath near η Cygni (abstract)". Publications of the American Astronomical Society. 6: 260. Bibcode:1931PAAS....6R.260D.
- Hubble, Edwin P.; Duncan, John C. (1931). "The nebulous envelope around Nova Aquilae 1918 (abstract)". Publications of the American Astronomical Society. 6: 365. Bibcode:1931PAAS....6Q.365H.
- Duncan, J. C.; Mitchell, H.M. (1929). "The radial velocity of beta Cephei on August 21, 1928". Astrophysical Journal. 70: 127–130. Bibcode:1929ApJ....70..127D. doi:10.1086/143204. "From thirty-three spectrograms of ~ Cephei, obtained with the 6o-inch reflector at Mount Wilson by Duncan on August 21, 1928, and measured at the Whitin Observatory by Miss Mitchell, the velocity-curve appears to be a sine curve of semi-amplitude 15.5 km/sec., with a superposed secondary oscillation of semi-amplitude 2.2 km/sec., and period half that of the main curve. The velocity of the center of mass, earlier shown by Crump to be variable, is -o.66 km/sec., the highest so far published. The period, which up to 1921 had appeared to be constant at 0.1904795 day, has certainly changed, and the observations here discussed may be brought into harmony with the Lick observations of 1921 by a period of either 0.1904838 or 0.1904722 day."
- Duncan, J. C. (1928). "Four Recent Novae in the Andromeda Nebula (M31)". Publications of the Astronomical Society of the Pacific. 40 (237): 347. Bibcode:1928PASP...40..347D. doi:10.1086/123862.
- Hubble, E.P.; Duncan, J. C. (July 1927). "The nebulous envelope around Nova Aquilae No. 3". Astrophysical Journal. 66: 59–63. Bibcode:1927ApJ....66...59H. doi:10.1086/143066.
- Duncan, John C. (1927). "Some nebulae recently photographed with the 100-inch Hooker telescope (abstract)". Publications of the American Astronomical Society. 5: 358. Bibcode:1927PAAS....5..358D.
- Duncan, John C.; Allen, Leah B. (1927). "A new celestial globe for the use of students (abstract)". Publications of the American Astronomical Society. 5: 145. Bibcode:1927PAAS....5..145D.
- Duncan, John C. (1927). "The radial motion of Y Sagittarii in 1922 and 1923 (abstract)". Publications of the American Astronomical Society. 5: 53. Bibcode:1927PAAS....5...53D.
- Hubble, Edwin; Duncan, John Charles (1927). "No. 335. The nebulous envelope around nova Aquilae no. 3". Contributions from the Mount Wilson Observatory / Carnegie Institution of Washington. 335: 1–5. Bibcode:1927CMWCI.335....1H.
- Duncan, J. C. (March 1926). "Photographic studies of nebulae. IV". Astrophysical Journal. 63: 122–126. Bibcode:1926ApJ....63..122D. doi:10.1086/142956.
- Duncan, John Charles (1925). "No. 303. Photographic studies of nebulae. Fourth paper". Contributions from the Mount Wilson Observatory / Carnegie Institution of Washington. 303: 1–5. Bibcode:1925CMWCI.303....1D.
- Duncan, J. C. (April 1923). "Photographic studies of nebulae. III". Astrophysical Journal. 57 (57): 137–148. Bibcode:1923ApJ....57..137D. doi:10.1086/142739.
- Duncan, J. C. (November 1922). "Changes in the spectrographic elements of Y Sagittarii". Astrophysical Journal. 56 (56): 340–343. Bibcode:1922ApJ....56..340D. doi:10.1086/142708.
- Duncan, J. C. (October 1922). "Three Variable Stars and Suspected Nova in the Spiral Nebula M 33 Trianguli". Publications of the Astronomical Society of the Pacific. 34 (201): 290. Bibcode:1922PASP...34..290D. doi:10.1086/123221.
- Duncan, John C. (1922). "Dark Nebulae in the Orion and Sagittarius Regions Photographed With the 100-Inch Hooker Telescope". Publications of the American Astronomical Society. 4: 259. Bibcode:1922PAAS....4..259D.
- Shapley, Harlow; Duncan, J. C. (1922). "The Globular Cluster Messier 22 (N. G. C. 6656)". Publications of the American Astronomical Society. 4: 48. Bibcode:1922PAAS....4...48S.
- Duncan, J. C. (October 1921). "The spectroscopic binary Boss 3644 Virginis". The Astrophysical Journal. 54: 226. Bibcode:1921ApJ....54..226D. doi:10.1086/142639.
- Duncan, J. C. (August 1921). "Two New Variable Stars in the Trifid Nebula". Publications of the Astronomical Society of the Pacific. 33 (194): 207. Bibcode:1921PASP...33..207D. doi:10.1086/123084.
- Duncan, John C. (June 1921). "Changes Observed in the Crab Nebula in Taurus". Proceedings of the National Academy of Sciences of the United States of America. 8 (6): 179–180. Bibcode:1921PNAS....7..179D. doi:10.1073/pnas.7.6.179. PMC 1084821. PMID 16586833.
- Duncan, J. C. (June 1921). "Bright and dark nebulae near ζ Orionis photographed with the 100-inch Hooker telescope". Astrophysical Journal. 53: 392–396. Bibcode:1921ApJ....53..392D. doi:10.1086/142617.
- Duncan, J. C. (February 1921). "Novae in the Andromeda Nebula". Publications of the Astronomical Society of the Pacific. 33 (191): 56. Bibcode:1921PASP...33...56D. doi:10.1086/123032.
- Duncan, J. C. (January 1921). "The spectroscopic orbit of the cepheid variable X Cygni". Astrophysical Journal. 53: 95–98. Bibcode:1921ApJ....53...95D. doi:10.1086/142585.
- Duncan, J. C. (January 1920). "Bright nebulae and star clusters in Sagittarius and Scutum photographed with the 60-inch reflector". Astrophysical Journal. 51: 4–12. Bibcode:1920ApJ....51....4D. doi:10.1086/142519.
- Duncan, J. C. (1918). "A Ninth Nova in the Andromeda Nebula". Publications of the Astronomical Society of the Pacific. 30 (176): 255. Bibcode:1918PASP...30..255D. doi:10.1086/122743.
- Duncan, J. C. (1912). "The spectroscopic binary (beta) Scorpionis". Lowell Observatory Bulletin. 2: 21–25. Bibcode:1912LowOB...2...21D. OCLC 33900217.
- Duncan, J. C. (1911). "Correction to L. O. Bulletin No. 151". Lick Observatory Bulletin. 6: 154. Bibcode:1911LicOB...6..154D. doi:10.5479/ADS/bib/1911LicOB.6.154D.
- Campbell, William Wallace; Moore, Joseph Haines; Wright, William Hammond; Duncan, John Charles (1911). "Sixty-eight stars whose radial velocities vary". Lick Observatory Bulletin. 6 (199): 140–154. Bibcode:1911LicOB...6..140C. doi:10.5479/ADS/bib/1911LicOB.6.140C. OCLC 34601397.
- Duncan, J. C. (1910). "The spectra of some Wolf-Rayet stars". Lick Observatory Bulletin. 6: 58–59. Bibcode:1910LicOB...6...58D. doi:10.5479/ADS/bib/1910LicOB.6.58D.
- Duncan, John Charles (1909). "Least squares solution of the orbit of RT Aurigae". Lick Observatory Bulletin. 5 (160): 120–121. Bibcode:1909LicOB...5..120D. doi:10.5479/ADS/bib/1909LicOB.5.120D. OCLC 34835616.
- Duncan, John Charles (1909). The Orbits of the Cepheid variables Y Sagittarii and RT Aurigae; with a Discussion of the possible Causes of this Type of Stellar Variation. Lick Observatory Bulletin (Thesis). pp.82–94. Bibcode:1909LicOB...5...82D.
- Duncan, J. C. (June 1908). "Tables of the Elements of Comet-Orbits, January, 1896, to December, 1907". Publications of the Astronomical Society of the Pacific. 20 (120): 172. Bibcode:1908PASP...20..172D. doi:10.1086/121811.
- Duncan, John Charles (1907). "Observations of Comet D 1907 (Daniel) ; Observations of (179) Klytaemnestra ; Observations of Comet E 1907 (Mellish)". Lick Observatory Bulletin. 4 (128): 185–186. Bibcode:1907LicOB...4..185D. doi:10.5479/ADS/bib/1907LicOB.4.185D. OCLC 34766665.
- Duncan, John Charles (1907). "Photographic observations of Comet D 1907 (Daniel)". Lick Observatory Bulletin. 126 (126): 171–180. Bibcode:1907LicOB...4..171D. doi:10.5479/ADS/bib/1907LicOB.4.171D. OCLC 34766659.
- Duncan, John C. (1907). "Elements and ephemeris of comet 1906 g". Astronomische Nachrichten. 173 (20): 319. Bibcode:1907AN....173..319D. doi:10.1002/asna.19061732009.
- Duncan, John C. (1906). "Observation of comets". Lowell Observatory Bulletin. 1: 166–167. Bibcode:1906LowOB...1..166D.
- Duncan, John C. (1906). "Photographic observations of comet c 1905 (Giacobini)". Lowell Observatory Bulletin. 1: 162–165. Bibcode:1906LowOB...1..162D. OCLC 33395440.
- Duncan, John C. (1906). "Observations of Comet e 1907 (Mellish)". Lick Observatory Bulletin. 4: 186. Bibcode:1906LicOB...4R.186D.
- Duncan, John C. (1906). "Observations of (179) Klytaemnestra". Lick Observatory Bulletin. 4: 186. Bibcode:1906LicOB...4Q.186D.

== Footnotes ==
- "Indiana University, Bachelor of Science in Astronomy and Astrophysics, 2024-25". 2025. "By way of comparison, the 2024-25 IU BS Astronomy/Astrophysics curriculum includes 48 hours of astronomy, 75 hours of physics, 45 hours of math through differential equations, and similar English and foreign language requirements."
- "University and Education News". Science. 21 (545): 904. 9 June 1905. Bibcode:1905Sci....21..904.. doi:10.1126/science.21.545.904. "Mr. Percival Lowell has established a liberally endowed fellowship, to be known as The Lawrence Fellowship, for the Department Astronomy at Indiana University. The endowment fellow is appointed by the department, but the appointment is subject to the approval of the founder. A Lawrence fellow shall be given an opportunity for astronomical research at the Lowell Observatory and to prepare a thesis on some astronomical subject agreeable to the director and the fellow. Mr. John C. Duncan has received the appointment for the year 1905-6."
- William Sheehan (2024). Parallel Lives of Astronomers, Percival Lowell and Edward Emerson Barnard. Springer International. p. 557. ISBN 9783031688003. "Clyde Tombaugh would later note that Pluto--the closest thing to such a planet--was then sixteenth magnitude, far fainter than the object Lowell was expecting and at the very limit of the search plates; it was also, because of its highly inclined orbit, far from the ecliptic and outside the range of the photographic coverage of the search."

== Citations ==
- "Knightstown High School - Galaxy Yearbook". Knightstown, IN. 1920. p. 183.
- "Duncan Research Files of Mary Ann (Duncan) Dobson the Genealogy Bug".
- "Indiana Authors and Their Books". Indiana University.
- "Who's who in America". 1926. p. 629.
- "Former UA Astronomer Dr. John Duncan Dies". Arizona Daily Star. September 12, 1967. p. 16.(subscription required)
- National Cyclopedia of American Biography. Vol. 54. New Jersey: Clifton. 1973. pp. 88–89.
- Dieke, Sally H. (1971). Gillispie, Charles Coulston (ed.). Dictionary of Scientific Biography. Vol. 4. New York: Charles Scribner's Sons. p. 249. ISBN 0070233446.
- "Duncan, John Charles". encyclopedia.com.
- Dieke, Sally H. "Duncan, John Charles".
- "General Notes". Publications of the Astronomical Society of the Pacific. 79 (470): 517–519. October 1967. Bibcode:1967PASP...79..517.. doi:10.1086/128547. JSTOR 40674524.
- "105th Indiana Infantry in the American Civil War". CivilWarIndex.com.
- John Lankford (1997). American Astronomy, Community, Careers, and Power, 1859-1940. U of Chicago Press. pp. 99–91. ISBN 0-226-46886-0.
- Indiana University Bulletin. Vol. 2. The University. 1905. p. 27.
- Cruikshank, Dale P.; Sheehan, William (2018). Discovering Pluto, Exploration at the Edge of the Solar System. University of Arizona Press. pp. 101–102. ISBN 978-0-8165-3431-9.
- "Digest of Education Statistics". National Center for Education Statistics.
- Marcia Bartusiak, ed. (2010). Archives of the Universe, 100 Discoveries That Transformed Our Understanding of the Cosmos. Knopf Doubleday. pp. 410–411.
- "Mount Wilson Observatory". 1930-1931 Year Book - Carnegie Institution of Washington. Carnegie Institution of Washington: 174. 1927.
- Kenneth R. Lang (2006). A Companion to Astronomy and Astrophysics. Springer New York. ISBN 978-0-387-33367-0.
- John B. Hearnshaw (2014). "9.14.3 Supernova spectroscopy to 1937". The Analysis of Starlight, Two Centuries of Astronomical Spectroscopy. Cambridge University Press. p. 238. ISBN 9781107031746.
- "General Notes". Publications of the Astronomical Society of the Pacific. 79 (470). IOP Publishing Limited: 517–519. October 1967. Bibcode:1967PASP...79..517.. doi:10.1086/128547. JSTOR 40674524.
- Hentschel, Klaus (1999). "The Culture of Visual Representations in Spectroscopic Education and Laboratory Instruction". Physics in Perspective. 1 (3): 282. Bibcode:1999PhP.....1..282H. doi:10.1007/s000160050023.
- Waldee, Stephen R. "The Horsehead Project:The Horsehead Takes on Its Shape and Popular Name".
- Duncan, J. C. (January 1920). "Bright nebulae and star clusters in Sagittarius and Scutum photographed with the 60-inch reflector". Astrophysical Journal. 51: 4–12. Bibcode:1920ApJ....51....4D. doi:10.1086/142519.
- Rudi Paul Lindner (2014), "Duncan, John Charles", in Thomas Hockey (ed.), Biographical Encyclopedia of Astronomers (Second ed.), New York: Springer Science+Business Media, pp. 619–620, Bibcode:2014bea..bookR.619L, doi:10.1007/978-1-4419-9917-7_387, ISBN 978-1-4419-9916-0
- Lutz D. Schmadel (1997), Dictionary of Minor Planet Names, vol. I (Third Revised and Enlarged ed.), Berlin, Heidelberg: Springer-Verlag, p. 356, ISBN 978-3-662-06617-1
- "John Charles Duncan", United States census, 1900; Wayne, Henry, Indiana; line 96, enumeration district 22, Family History film 004118616. Retrieved on 2025-02-13.
