= Mabel Augusta Chase =

American physicist (1865–1939)

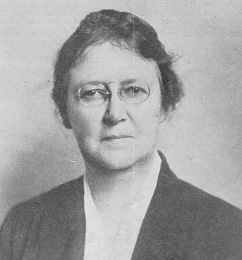
- Chase, as a professor at Mount Holyoke College (1906–1933)
- Born: October 11, 1865
- Died: March 31, 1939 (aged 73)
- Education: Oberlin College, Cornell University
- Scientific career
- Fields: Physics
- Workplaces: Mount Holyoke College

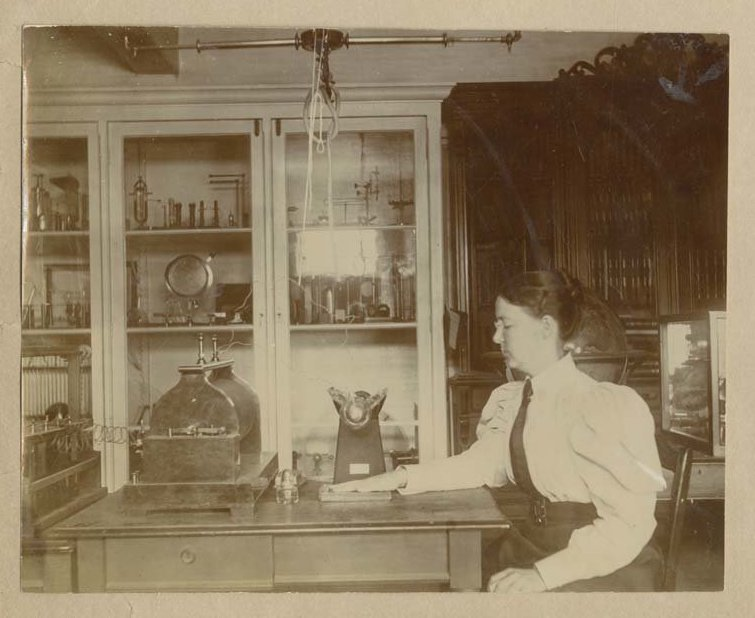
Chase places her hand on a glass photographic plate in an experiment done in the Wellesley physics laboratory. She is taking a radiograph of the bones in her hand.

Mabel Augusta Chase (October 11, 1865 – March 31, 1939) was an American physicist and university professor.

== Biography ==
=== Early life ===
Mabel Augusta Chase was born on October 11, 1865, in Lyndonville, New York. Her parents were Julia Augusta Spence and Frederick Augustus Chase. She was born as the eldest of five children, with only her two younger brothers surviving past childhood.

Her father was a Presbyterian clergyman and minister as well as a professor of natural science. He taught at Fisk University, a historically black university, in Nashville and was also president of Lyons Female College in Clinton, Iowa. Both his passion for science and knack for teaching were passed onto his daughter, Mabel, who came to study physics.

=== Education ===
Chase attended Oberlin College from 1886 to 1888 and graduated with a degree in physics. She then attended Cornell University, where she obtained her master's degree and her PhD, finishing in 1890. She wrote her dissertation on a subject that would be a common interest throughout her life: light. Specifically, the writing studied optics and the relationship between the shape of the human eye and the perception of color.

=== Career ===
After her studies, Chase became a teacher. She taught at Wellesley College, Mount Holyoke College, and other Massachusetts area schools until she became an associate professor at Mount Holyoke in 1906. She was a professor at Mount Holyoke from 1906 to 1933 and achieved the title of Professor Emeritus. She was seen as the second in command of the physics department during her time and mentored students and other professors. Students described her as not very organized but very understanding and a good teacher.

In addition to teaching, she conducted research and published her findings. Her work throughout her career was varied but mostly centered around research and advancements in light and color. Scientific journals published some of her work on light and iridescence. Her work on advanced topics in physics took her to other institutions, including the University of Chicago and the Imperial College of London.

Along her own research, she also worked closely with Sarah Frances Whiting in establishing a physics laboratory at Wellesley College and investigating x-rays. Their experiments were based on newly published work by German scientist Wilhelm Röntgen. They used the same equipment which included a Crookes tube, an induction coil, a battery, glass plates and holders, and photographic chemicals to produce "shadow photographs" or x-ray images. While experimenting, they varied the objects examined, the timing of the photograph, and the materials used, in order to improve image quality and learn how x-rays would penetrate materials of different material and makeup.

During her life and career, Chase was a member of various esteemed organizations related to her academic endeavors. She was a member of the American Physical Society, the American Association for the Advancement of Science, the American Association of University Women, and the Foreign Policy Association.

=== Later life and legacy ===
Chase retired from Mount Holyoke College in 1933. She died on March 31, 1939, after being injured in a car accident. Like her father before her, Chase was buried in Nashville, Tennessee. She remains regarded as one of the most active and knowledgeable woman scientists in the field of physics during the early 20th century.
