= SN 2024abfl =

Supernova from a red supergiant

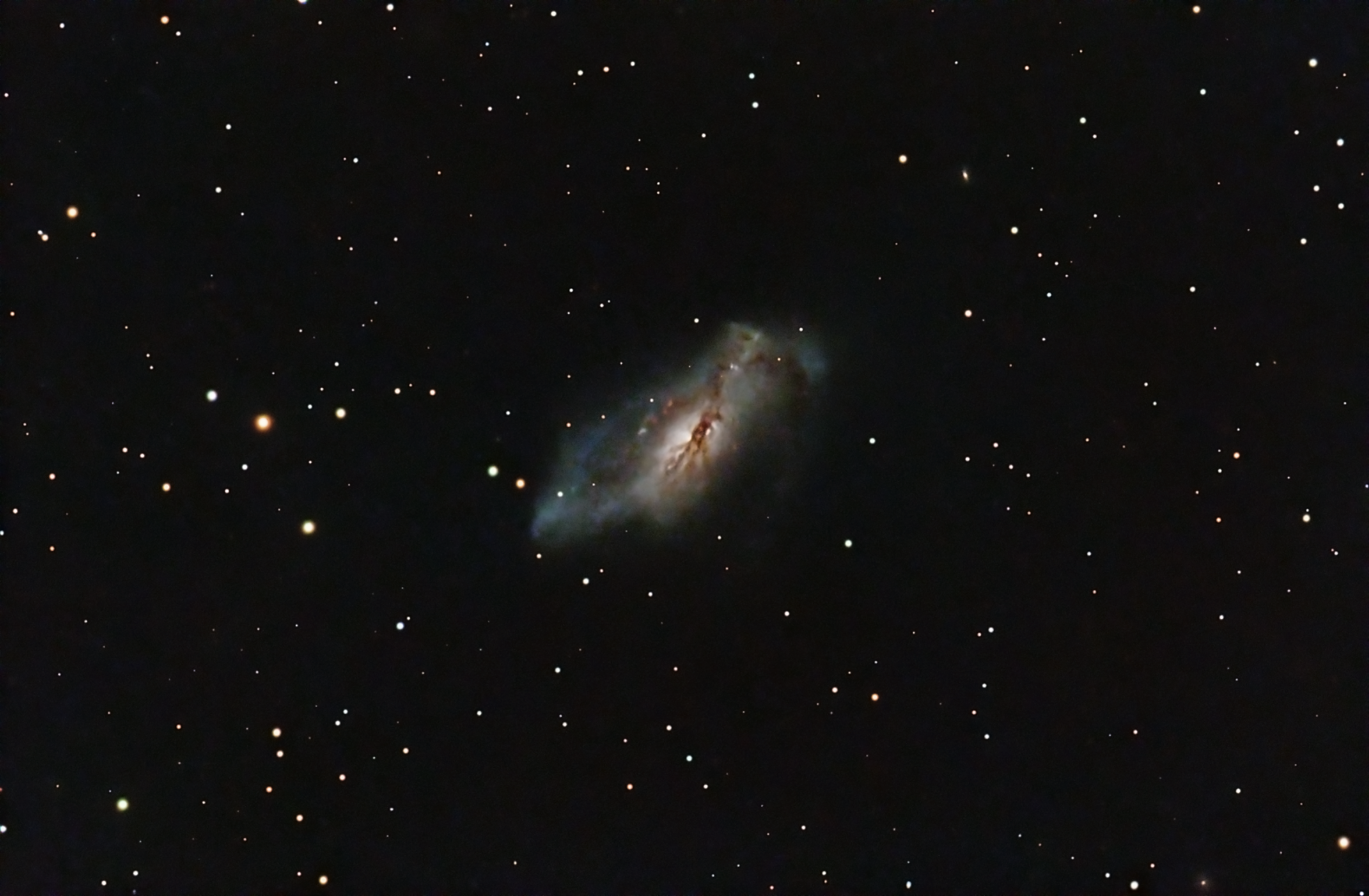
- Image of the NGC 2146 galaxy which is where the supernova occurred
- Type ll
- Date: 15 November 2024
- Constellation: Camelopardalis
- Distance: 41 million ly
- Redshift: 0.002979
- Progenitor type: Red supergiant

SN 2024abfl was a Type ll supernova that occurred in the starburst barred spiral galaxy NGC 2146 about 41 million light years from Earth in the constellation of Camelopardalis.

The progenitor of the SN 2024abfl supernova was a typical red supergiant (RSG) star that was slightly reddened by interstellar dust. The initial mass of this star was likely somewhere between 9-12 solar masses.
