= NGC 2146 =

Galaxy in the constellation Camelopardalis

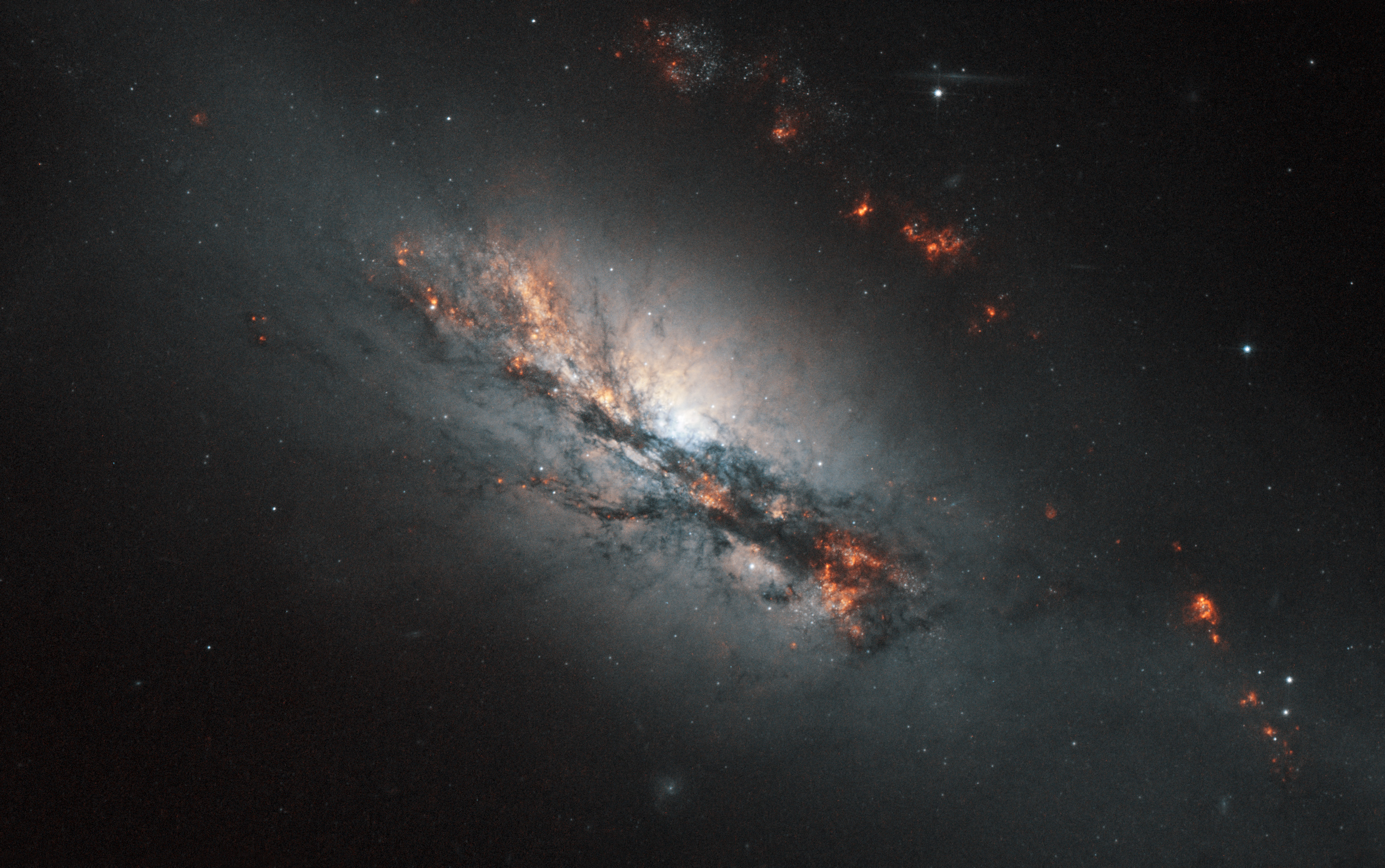
- NGC 2146 imaged by the Hubble Space Telescope

Observation data (J2000 epoch)
- Constellation: Camelopardalis
- Right ascension: 06^{h} 18^{m} 37.710^{s}
- Declination: +78° 21′ 25.27″
- Redshift: 0.002999±0.000003
- Heliocentric radial velocity: 899±1 km/s
- Galactocentric velocity: 1,043±6 km/s
- Distance: 63.76 ± 26.62 Mly (19.550 ± 8.161 Mpc)
- Apparent magnitude (V): 11.38±0.13
- Apparent magnitude (B): 10.59±0.13
- magnitude (J): 8.228±0.020
- magnitude (H): 7.416±0.021
- magnitude (K): 7.063±0.023

Characteristics
- Type: SB(s)ab pec; HII;LIRG
- Size: 119,760 ly (36.72 kpc) (diameter; 25.0 B-mag arcsec^{−2}); 124,750 ly × 58,643 ly (38.25 kpc × 17.98 kpc) (diameter; "total" magnitude)
- Apparent size (V): 7.97142′ × 3.49228135′

Other designations
- 4C +78.06, IRAS 06106+7822, UGC 3429, MCG +13-05-022, PGC 18797, CGCG 348-017

NGC 2146 (also known as the Dusty Hand Galaxy) is a barred spiral galaxy type SB(s)ab pec in the constellation Camelopardalis. The galaxy was discovered in 1876 by Friedrich August Theodor Winnecke.

NGC 2146 has an isophotal diameter of 38.3 kiloparsecs (125,000 light-years), slightly larger than the Milky Way. The galaxy's most conspicuous feature is the dusty lanes of a spiral arm lying across the core of the galaxy as seen from Earth, the arm having been bent 45 degrees by a close encounter with a smaller galaxy, possibly NGC 2146A, about 0.8 billion years ago. This close encounter is credited with the relatively high rates of star formation that qualify NGC 2146 as a starburst galaxy.

== Supernovae ==
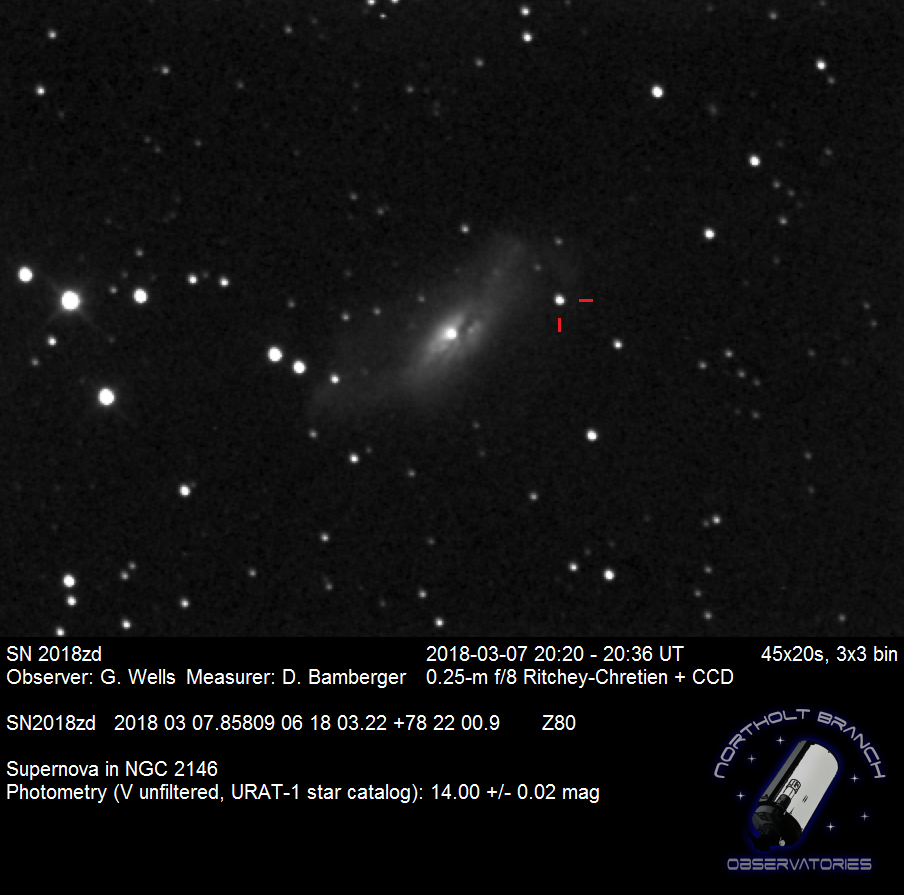
SN 2018zd, imaged at Northolt Branch Observatories on 7 March 2018. At that time, the supernova was visible at magnitude +14.0 and brightening.

NGC 2146 has been host to three known supernova events:

- SN 2005V (Type Ib/c, mag. 16) was discovered by LIRIS on 30 January 2005.
- SN 2018zd (Type II, mag. 17.8) is possibly a Type IIn and might be the first electron-capture supernova, and was discovered on 2 March 2018 by Kōichi Itagaki.
- SN 2024abfl (Type II, mag. 17.5) was discovered on 15 November 2024 by Kōichi Itagaki.
