= Barbara McCarthy (American politician) =

American politician

Member of New Hampshire House of Representatives for Rockingham 5
- In office 2008–2010

Personal details
- Born: July 20, 1934 Chicago, Illinois
- Died: January 18, 2014 (aged 79) Sandown, New Hampshire
- Party: Democratic
- Education: Merrimack College

Barbara A. McCarthy (July 20, 1934 – January 18, 2014) was an American politician. She was a Democrat. She represented Rockingham 5th district at the New Hampshire House of Representatives from 2008 to 2010. She earned a bachelor of science degree in chemistry from Merrimack College.
