= Sarah Frances Whiting =

American physicist and astronomer

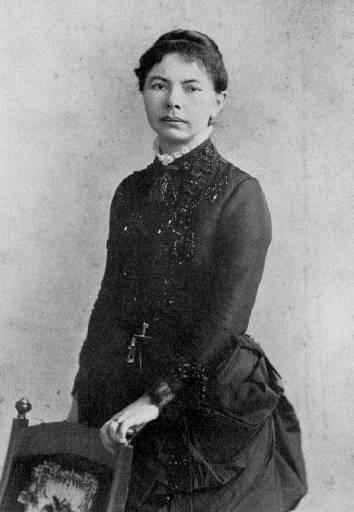
- Born: August 23, 1847
- Died: September 12, 1927 (aged 80)
- Education: Ingham University
- Known for: X-rays
- Scientific career
- Fields: Astronomy; Physics
- Workplaces: Wellesley College
- Notable students: Annie Jump Cannon; Isabelle Stone; Louise Sherwood McDowell

Sarah Frances Whiting (August 23, 1847 – September 12, 1927) was an American physicist and astronomer. In February 1896 Whiting founded both the physics and astronomy departments; and was the first professor of physics and astronomy at Wellesley College, where she taught for over 30 years. At Wellesley College, Whiting instructed several notable astronomers and physicists, including Annie Jump Cannon. Whiting was one of the founders and the first director of the Whitin Observatory.

== Biography ==
Sarah was one of the two daughters of Elizabeth Lee Comstock Whiting and Joel Whiting. Whiting was interested from an early age in science by her father, who taught natural philosophy. She would often attend and help setup presentations for his classes. Whiting graduated from Ingham University in 1865, after which she taught classics and mathematics at Brooklyn Heights Seminary, a girls' secondary school in Brooklyn.

Whiting was appointed by Wellesley College president Henry Fowle Durant, one year after the College's 1875 opening, as its first professor of physics. She established its physics department and the undergraduate experimental physics lab at Wellesley, the second of its kind to be started in the country. At the request of Durant, she attended lectures at the Massachusetts Institute of Technology given by Edward Charles Pickering. Through attending Pickering's classes, Whiting observed the techniques of teaching science through laboratory work, which was then new to the United States. Whiting adopted this pedagogy for her own classes, and so established the second undergraduate physics laboratory in the United States, after MIT.

Pickering also invited Whiting to observe some of the new techniques being applied to astronomy, such as spectroscopy. In 1880, Whiting started teaching a course of practical astronomy at Wellesley.

In February 1896, only a few weeks after the public announcement of the discovery of x-rays, Whiting conducted x-ray experiments with her students and other physics professors. She was among the first in the United States and likely the first woman to successfully replicate Wilhelm Röntgen's x-rays. Her original glass plates were not able to be recovered, however, fifteen photographs printed from them were retrieved from a campus building slated for demolition. They provide a glimpse into Whiting's work. As told by biographer and former student Annie Jump Cannon,

An especially exciting moment came when the Boston morning papers reported the discovery of the Rontgen or X-rays in 1895. The advanced students in physics of those days will always remember the zeal with which Miss Whiting immediately set up an old Crookes tube and the delight when she actually obtained some of the first photographs taken in this country of coins within a purse and bones within the flesh.

In addition to Cannon, Whiting was also assisted or attended in the X-ray experiments by Mabel Augusta Chase and Grace Evangeline Davis. In these experiments, they played with the variables in the established set up to improve image quality and learn how x-rays could penetrate different materials.

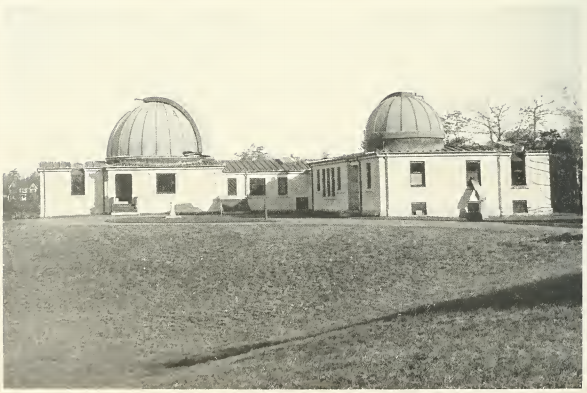
The Whitin Observatory, as depicted in the 1935 issue of The Legenda, the Wellesley College yearbook.

Between 1896 and 1900, Whiting helped Wellesley College trustee Sarah Elizabeth Whitin to establish the Whitin Observatory, of which Whiting became the first director.

During her time at Wellesley, Whiting kept up to date on scientific developments and shared the knowledge with her students. She met with Thomas Edison and learned of his incandescent bulbs. She then gave a demonstration at Wellesley of these bulbs to the board of trustees in the hopes of getting them to invest in the new technology. Additionally, she traveled and attended classes at universities all over the world and connected with scientists.

Tufts College bestowed an honorary doctorate on Whiting in 1905.

Whiting retired from her position as a professor of physics at Wellesley in 1912, but remained as Director of the Whitin Observatory until 1916. She held the title of Professor Emeritus until her death at 81 years old in 1927 in Wilbraham, Massachusetts.

== Writings ==
Daytime and Evening Exercises in Astronomy

Whiting wrote the textbook Daytime and Evening Exercises in Astronomy, for Schools and Colleges.

She was an author of several articles in Popular Astronomy, including:

- "Use of Graphs in Teaching Astronomy",
- "Use of Drawings in Orthographic Projection and of Globes in Teaching Astronomy",
- "Spectroscopic Work for Classes in Astronomy",
- "The Use of Photographs in Teaching Astronomy",
- "Partial Solar Eclipse, June 28, 1908",
- Solar Halos,
- "A Pedagogical Suggestion for Teachers of Astronomy",
- "Priceless Accessions to Whitin Observatory Wellesley College",
- "The Tulse Hill Observatory Diaries"

Whiting also wrote an obituary for Margaret Lindsay Huggins and reminiscences of William Thomson.

She described her experiences in physics in the Wellesley College News article "The experiences of a woman physicist."

== Achievements ==
Honors:

- 1883 Member, American Association for the Advancement of Science (AAAS)
- 1905 Honorary doctorate, Tufts College

Tenures:

- 1876–1912 Professor of Physics, Wellesley College
- 1900–1916 Director, Whitin Observatory, Wellesley College
- 1916–1927 Professor Emeritus, Wellesley College

Education:

- AB Ingham University 1865
