= Barbara P. McCarthy =

American Hellenist and academic

- Born: Barbara Philippa McCarthy; September 25, 1904; Providence, Rhode Island, US
- Died: October 28, 1988 (aged 84); Pawtucket, Rhode Island, US
- Occupation: Classical Scholar

Barbara Philippa McCarthy (September 25, 1904 – October 28, 1988) was an American Hellenist and academic. McCarthy is mainly known for her work on Lucian of Samosata and his interactions with the Menippean satire.

== Education ==
McCarthy completed her B.A. at Pembroke College, the private women's college of Brown University, in 1925. Between 1925 and 1927 McCarthy was a postgraduate student at the American School of Classical Studies in Athens. She was awarded an M.A. by the University of Missouri in 1927. McCarthy completed her PhD at Yale University in 1929 with a dissertation titled The originality of Lucian's Satiric Dialogues, under the supervision of A. M. Harmon. She was awarded the title of Doctor of Letters by Brown University in 1980.

== Career ==
From 1929 to 1970 McCarthy taught at Wellesley College, where she was Professor of Greek from 1929 to 1955, and Ellen A. Kendall Professor of Greek from 1955 to 1970. In 1934 at Wellesley McCarthy initiated the production of plays in Greek, which she directed. She was lecturer at the College of the Holy Cross between 1970 and 1974, and visiting professor at Brandeis University in 1973.

In 1956–1957 McCarthy was the president of the Classical Association of New England, by which she was later awarded the Barlow-Beach Award for Distinguished Service, in 1978.

Barbara McCarthy is mainly known for her work on Menippean satire, and especially for her article 'Lucian and Menippus' (Yale Classical Studies 4: 3–55), an adaptation of her PhD dissertation. Here McCarthy engaged with the theses of the philologist Rudolf Helm. In the book Lucian und Menipp (1906), Helm claimed that Lucian was heavily indebted to the Cynic Menippus. In her article, Barbara McCarthy did identify similar motives, themes and frames between Lucian's writings and the Menippean fragments. However, she argued that there was no evidence of a close copying of forms and thematic of Menippus' satires by Lucian. Her work supports Lucian's claim of originating his form of satiric dialog.

== Death and legacy ==
McCarthy died October 28, 1988.

In 2000, McCarthy was commemorated by her former student at Wellesley Lynn Sherr in a talk given at the Classical Association of the Atlantic States meeting at Princeton (29 April 2000). In 2004, a panel of the Classical Association of the Atlantic States spring meeting in New York was dedicated to the memory of McCarthy (24 April 2004): New Directions in Research and Teaching on Elementary Greek and Greek Prose Authors, Commemorating the One Hundredth Birthday of Barbara Philippa McCarthy, Ellen A. Kendall Professor of Greek, Wellesley College.

== List of publications ==
=== Articles ===
- McCarthy, Barbara (1934) 'Lucian and Menippus,' Yale Classical Studies 4: 3–55.
- McCarthy, Barbara P. (1931) 'Line omissions in Homeric papyri since 1925', Transactions of the American Philological Association 22: 151–155.
- McCarthy, Barbara P. (1943) 'Sarcasm in the Iliad,' The Classical Weekly 36 (18): 215–216.

=== Chapters in edited volumes ===
- McCarthy, Barbara P. (1936) 'The form of Varro's Menippean satire', in Robinson, R.P. (ed.) Philological studies in honor of W. Miller. Columbia: 95–107.

=== Books ===
- Elizabeth Barrett to Mr. Boyd: Unpublished Letters of Elizabeth Barrett Browning to Hugh Stuart Boyd. Introduced and edited by Barbara P. McCarthy. New Haven: 1955.
