= Timeline of white dwarfs, neutron stars, and supernovae =

Chronological list of developments in knowledge and records

This list is a historical timeline of events related to neutron stars, pulsars, supernovae, and white dwarfs.

This list is mainly about the development of knowledge, but also about some supernovae taking place. For a separate list of the latter, see the article List of supernovae. All dates refer to when the supernova was observed on Earth or would have been observed on Earth had powerful enough telescopes existed at the time.

== Timeline ==
- 185 – Chinese astronomers become the first to record observations of a supernova, SN 185.
- 1006 – SN 1006, a magnitude −7.5 supernova in the constellation of Lupus, is observed throughout Asia, the Middle East, and Europe.
- 1054 – Astronomers in Asia and the Middle East observe SN 1054, the Crab Nebula supernova explosion.
- 1181 – Chinese astronomers observe the SN 1181 supernova.
- 1572 – Tycho Brahe discovers a supernova (SN 1572) in the constellation Cassiopeia.
- 1604 – Johannes Kepler's supernova, SN 1604, in Serpens is observed.
- 1862 – Alvan Graham Clark observes Sirius B.
- 1866 – William Huggins studies the spectrum of a nova and discovers that it is surrounded by a cloud of hydrogen.
- 1885 – A supernova, S Andromedae, is observed in the Andromeda Galaxy leading to recognition of supernovae as a distinct class of novae.
- 1910 – the spectrum of 40 Eridani B is observed, making it the first confirmed white dwarf.
- 1914 – Walter Sydney Adams determines an incredibly high density for Sirius B.
- 1926 – Ralph Fowler uses Fermi–Dirac statistics to explain white dwarf stars.
- 1930 – Subrahmanyan Chandrasekhar discovers the white dwarf maximum mass limit.
- 1933 – Fritz Zwicky and Walter Baade propose the neutron star idea and suggest that supernovae might be created by the collapse of normal stars to neutron stars—they also point out that such events can explain the cosmic ray background.
- 1939 – Robert Oppenheimer and George Volkoff calculate the first neutron star models.
- 1942 – J.J.L. Duyvendak, Nicholas Mayall, and Jan Oort deduce that the Crab Nebula is a remnant of the 1054 supernova observed by Chinese astronomers.
- 1958 – Evry Schatzman, Kent Harrison, Masami Wakano, and John Wheeler show that white dwarfs are unstable to inverse beta decay.
- 1962 – Riccardo Giacconi, Herbert Gursky, Frank Paolini, and Bruno Rossi discover Scorpius X-1.
- 1967 – Jocelyn Bell and Antony Hewish discover radio pulses from a pulsar, PSR B1919+21.
- 1967 – J.R. Harries, Kenneth G. McCracken, R.J. Francey, and A.G. Fenton discover the first X-ray transient (Cen X-2).
- 1968 – Thomas Gold proposes that pulsars are rotating neutron stars.
- 1969 – David H. Staelin, Edward C. Reifenstein, William Cocke, Mike Disney, and Donald Taylor discover the Crab Nebula pulsar thus connecting supernovae, neutron stars, and pulsars.
- 1971 – Riccardo Giacconi, Herbert Gursky, Ed Kellogg, R. Levinson, E. Schreier, and H. Tananbaum discover 4.8 second X-ray pulsations from Centaurus X-3.
- 1972 – Charles Kowal discovers the Type Ia supernova SN 1972e in NGC 5253, which would be observed for more than a year and become the basis case for the type,
- 1974 – Russell Hulse and Joseph Taylor discover the binary pulsar PSR B1913+16.
- 1977 – Kip Thorne and Anna Żytkow present a detailed analysis of Thorne–Żytkow objects.
- 1982 – Donald Backer, Shrinivas Kulkarni, Carl Heiles, Michael Davis, and Miller Goss discover the millisecond pulsar PSR B1937+214.
- 1985 – Michiel van der Klis discovers 30 Hz quasi-periodic oscillations in GX 5-1.
- 1987 – Ian Shelton discovers SN 1987A in the Large Magellanic Cloud.
- 2003 – first double binary pulsar, PSR J0737−3039, discovered at Parkes Observatory.
- 2006 – Robert Quimby and P. Mondol discover SN 2006gy (a possible hypernova) in NGC 1260.
- 2017 – first observation of neutron star merger, accompanied with gravitational wave signal GW170817, short gamma-ray bursts GRB 170817A, optical transient AT 2017gfo and other electromagnetic signals.
