= Jacobus Malvecius =

Jacopo Malvezzi (Latinized as Jacobus de Malvetiis; also Malvetius, Malvecius, died c. 1432) was a Renaissance-era doctor and historiographer of Brescia. He compiled a Chronicon Brixianum ab origine urbis ad annum usque 1332. This text was proposed as containing a possible reference to the supernova of 1054 by Umberto Dall'Olmo in 1980.
