= SN 1006 =

Supernova observed from Earth in 1006

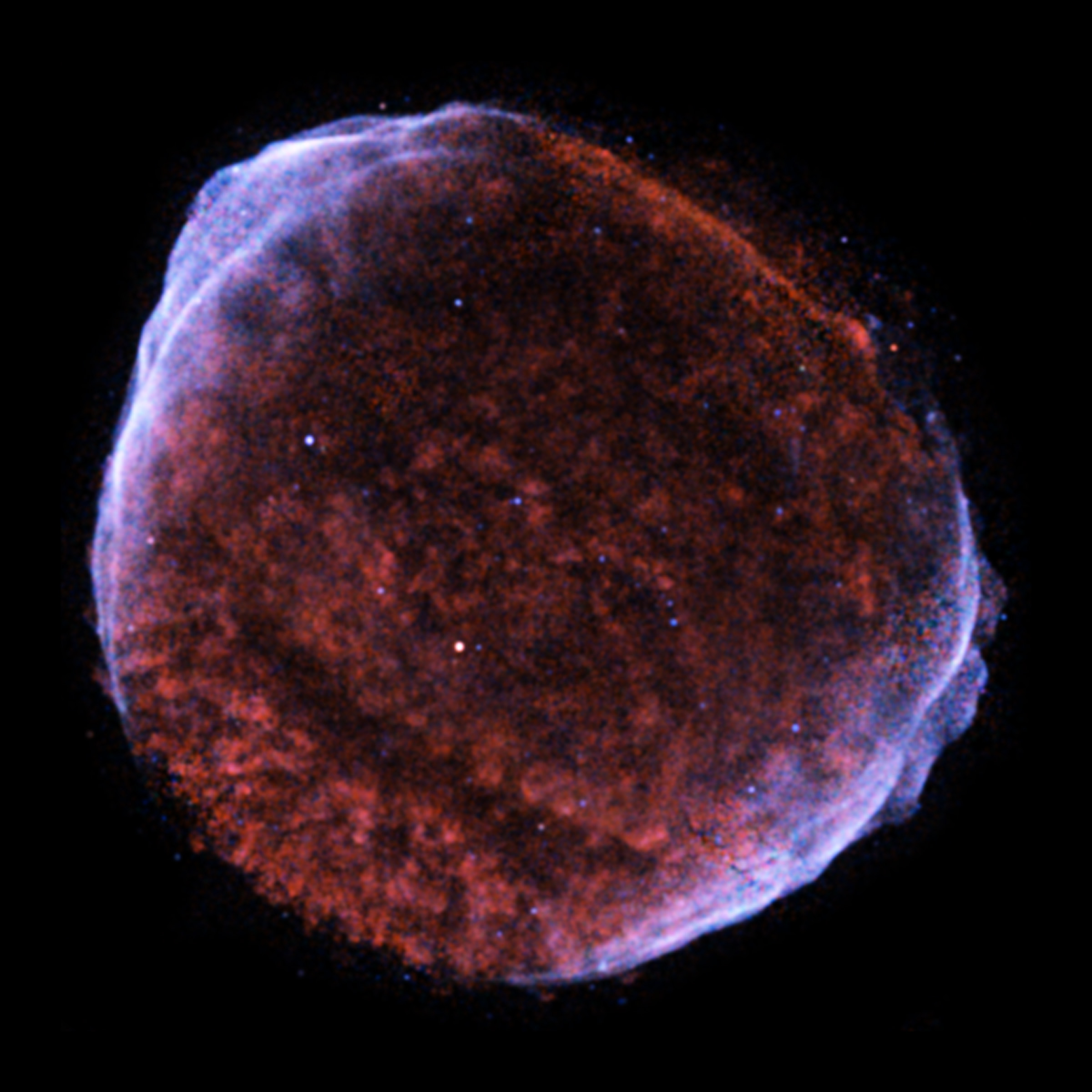
- False-colour X-ray image of SN 1006 supernova remnant
- Event type: Supernova, supernova remnant, astronomical radio source, astrophysical X-ray source
- Type Ia (presumably)
- Date: April 15−May 1, 1006 (Julian calendar)
- Constellation: Lupus
- Right ascension: 15^{h} 2^{m} 8^{s}
- Declination: −41° 57′
- Epoch: J2000
- Galactic coordinates: 327.6+14.6
- Distance: 7,200 light-years (2.2 kpc)
- Remnant: Shell
- Host: Milky Way
- Progenitor: Unknown
- Progenitor type: Most likely two white dwarfs
- Colour (B-V): Japanese observers describe as blue-white at visible spectrum
- Notable features: Brightest supernova in recorded history, and therefore most described of the pretelescopic era
- Peak apparent magnitude: −7.5
- Other designations: SN 1006, SN 1006A, SN 1016, SNR G327.6+14.6, SNR G327.6+14.5, 1ES 1500-41.5, MRC 1459-417, XSS J15031-4149, PKS 1459-41, AJG 37, 4U 1458-41, 3U 1439-39, 2U 1440-39, MSH 14-4-15, PKS 1459-419, PKS J1502-4205
- Preceded by: SN 393
- Followed by: SN 1054
- Related media on Commons

SN 1006 was a supernova that is likely the brightest observed stellar event in recorded history, reaching an estimated −7.5 visual magnitude, and exceeding roughly sixteen times the brightness of Venus. First noted in 1006 some time between April 15 and May 1 (Julian calendar) in the constellation of Lupus, this "guest star" was described by observers across China, Japan, modern-day Iraq, Egypt, and Europe, and was possibly recorded in North American petroglyphs. Some reports state it was clearly visible in the daytime. Modern astronomers now consider its distance from Earth to be about 7,200 light-years or 2,200 parsecs.

== Historic reports ==
Egyptian astrologer and astronomer Ali ibn Ridwan, writing in a commentary on Ptolemy's Tetrabiblos, stated that the "spectacle was a large circular body, 2 1/2 to 3 times as large as Venus. The sky was shining because of its light. The intensity of its light was a little more than a quarter that of Moon light" (or perhaps "than the light of the Moon when one-quarter illuminated"). Like all other observers, Ali ibn Ridwan noted that the new star was low on the southern horizon. Some astrologers interpreted the event as a portent of plague and famine.

The most northerly sighting is recorded in the Annales Sangallenses maiores of the Abbey of Saint Gall in Switzerland, at a latitude of 47.5° north. Monks at St. Gall provided independent data as to its magnitude and location in the sky, writing that

[i]n a wonderful manner this was sometimes contracted, sometimes diffused, and moreover sometimes extinguished ... It was seen likewise for three months in the inmost limits of the south, beyond all the constellations which are seen in the sky.

This description is often taken as probable evidence that the supernova was of type Ia.

In The Book of Healing, Iranian philosopher Ibn Sina reported observing this supernova from northeastern Iran. He reported it as a transient celestial object which was stationary and/or tail-less (a star among the stars), that it remained for close to 3 months getting fainter and fainter until it disappeared, that it threw out sparks, that is, it was scintillating and very bright, and that the color changed with time.

Some sources state that the star was bright enough to cast shadows; it was certainly seen during daylight hours for some time.

According to Songshi, the official history of the Song dynasty (sections 56 and 461), the star seen on May 1, 1006, appeared to the south of constellation Di, between Lupus and Centaurus. It shone so brightly that objects on the ground could be seen at night.

By December, it was again sighted in the constellation Di. The Chinese astrologer Zhou Keming, who was on his return to Kaifeng from his duty in Guangdong, interpreted the star to the emperor on May 30 as an auspicious star, yellow in color and brilliant in its brightness, that would bring great prosperity to the state over which it appeared. The reported color yellow should be taken with some suspicion, however, because Zhou may have chosen a favorable color for political reasons.

There appear to have been two distinct phases in the early evolution of this supernova. There was first a three-month period at which it was at its brightest; after this period it diminished, then returned for a period of about eighteen months.

Petroglyphs by the Hohokam in White Tank Mountain Regional Park, Arizona, and by the Ancestral Puebloans in Chaco Culture National Historical Park, New Mexico, have been interpreted as the first known North American representations of the supernova, though other researchers remain skeptical. The White Tank Mountain Regional Park petroglyph depicts a "star-like object" over a scorpion symbol. It has been argued that the scorpion represents the constellation Scorpius, despite the lack of evidence that the Native Americans interpreted the stars of that constellation as a scorpion.

The medieval Arab historian Al-Maqrizi also mentioned this supernova.

Earlier observations discovered from Yemen may indicate a sighting of SN 1006 on April 17±2 (15 Rajab, AH 696), nearly two weeks before its previously assumed earliest observation.

== Remnant ==
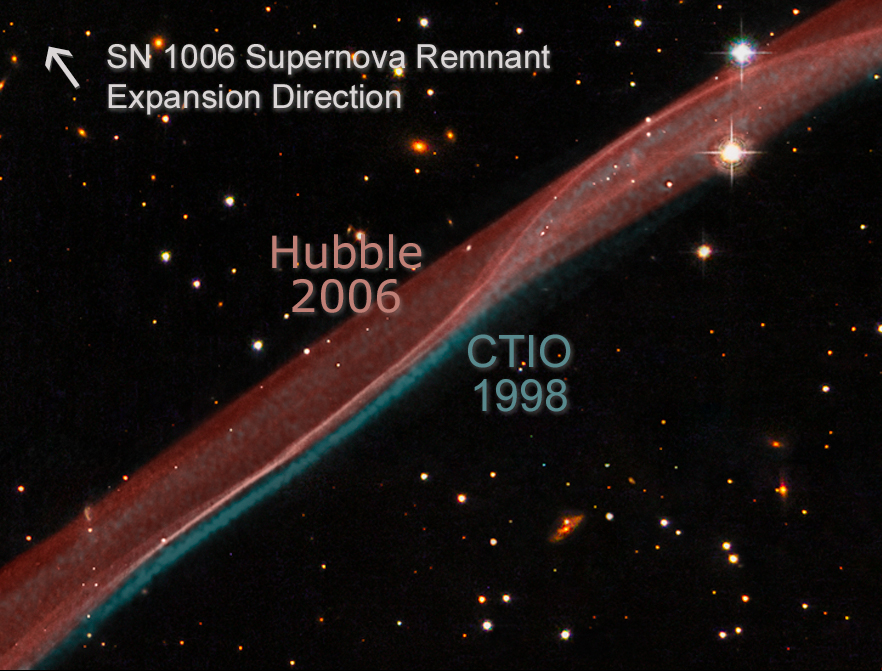
SN 1006 remnant expansion comparison

SN 1006's associated supernova remnant from this event was first identified in 1965, when Doug Milne and Frank Gardner used the Parkes radio telescope to demonstrate a connection to known radio source PKS 1459−41. This is located near the star Beta Lupi, displaying a 30 arcmin circular shell. X-ray and optical emission from this remnant have also been detected, and during 2010 the H.E.S.S. gamma-ray observatory announced the detection of very-high-energy gamma-ray emission from the remnant. No associated neutron star or black hole has been found, which is the situation expected for the remnant of a Type Ia supernova (a class of explosion believed to completely disrupt its progenitor star). A survey in 2012 to find any surviving companions of the SN 1006 progenitor found no subgiant or giant companion stars, indicating that SN 1006 most likely had double degenerate progenitors; that is, the merging of two white dwarf stars.

Remnant SNR G327.6+14.6 has an estimated distance of 2.2 kpc from Earth, making the true linear diameter approximately 20 parsecs.

== See also ==
- History of supernova observation
- List of supernova candidates
- List of supernova remnants
- List of supernovae
