= Jerónimo Muñoz =

Spanish mathematician, astronomer (c. 1520 – 1591)

- Born: c. 1520; Valencia, Kingdom of Valencia
- Died: October 1591 (aged 70–71); Uncertain, probably Valladolid, Kingdom of Castile
- Education: University of Valencia
- Occupation: Professor
- Notable work: Libro del nuevo cometa

Jerónimo Muñoz (c. 1520 – October 1591) was a Valencian astronomer, mathematician, and professor. After graduating from the University of Valencia in 1537, he was educated in astronomy and mathematics by the mathematicians and professors Oronce Fine and Gemma Frisius. Muñoz became a professor in the 1540s and taught astronomy, mathematics, and Hebrew until his death in 1591. A prominent and highly respected figure in Spanish mathematics and astronomy, he gained fame throughout Europe for his 1573 publication Libro del nuevo cometa, his account of SN 1572.

== Early life and education ==
Muñoz was born in Valencia around 1520. He studied at the University of Valencia, graduating as a Bachelor of Arts on 6 June 1537. Following his graduation, he continued his education travelling across Europe. He stayed in Paris, where he was a disciple of the Collège Royal professor of mathematics Oronce Fine, until roughly 1540. Muñoz then left Paris and went to Leuven to study under Gemma Frisius, a professor of medicine at the University of Leuven. At that time, the university officially lacked a mathematics professor, so Muñoz attended private lessons in astronomy and geometry delivered by Frisius in his own home. The teachings of both Fine and Frisius had a large impact on Muñoz's own career as an astronomer and mathematician. Muñoz married Isabel de Valenzuela and had four children: Eudoxia, Jerónima, Estefanía, and Francisco.

== Life and career ==
Concluding his studies in Leuven, Muñoz travelled to Ancona, where he taught Hebrew at the city's university in the late 1540s. His mastery of Hebrew purportedly caused Jews who heard him speak to accuse Muñoz of being a Jew himself. He also joined the retinue of Giovanni Poggio and performed cartographical studies in Italy, Spain, and France. At some point before 1556, he returned to Valencia, where he began giving private classes in mathematics. In 1563, he returned to the University of Valencia as a Hebrew professor; two years later, he also became a mathematics professor at the university. As a professor in both subjects, he was both well-paid and well-respected; those who selected Muñoz for the mathematics professorship called him "distinguished and eminent in all of the sciences". In addition to teaching, Muñoz also worked as a cartographer and a surveyor, as well as overseeing municipal construction projects.

In 1578, Muñoz left Valencia to teach a wide variety of subjects at the University of Salamanca, which had offered him an annual salary of 400 ducats and a bonus of 30 ducats to help him move. He intended to return to Valencia in 1582 but did not do so; he instead continued to teach in Salamanca until 1591, the year of his death. He was a major figure in Spanish mathematical circles and was considered an "expert" in the field by Gabriel Serrano, who succeeded him at the University of Salamanca. According to Tayra M.C. Lanuza Navarro, a researcher at the University of Valencia, Muñoz was the "foremost Spanish astronomer of the sixteenth century". On 2 October 1591, Muñoz had his last will and testament notarized while on his deathbed in Valladolid. He died no later than 19 October, as on that date, the University of Salamanca sought to fill the vacancy caused by his death.

== Works ==
During his lifetime, Muñoz published four works. His first, Institutiones Arithmeticae ad Percipiendam Astrologiam et Mathematicas facultates necessariae, was published in 1566 and covers essential arithmetic knowledge needed for astronomic calculations. Muñoz's second work, Libro del nuevo cometa, was published in 1573 after Philip II of Spain requested its creation. The publication, which begins with a refutation of Aristotelian cosmology, is Muñoz's account of SN 1572, which he observed on 2 December 1572 while still a professor at the University of Valencia. Muñoz believed that the supernova could not have been a star due to its changing appearance; he instead classified it as a star-like comet. The work was widely circulated in Europe, making Muñoz a famous scientific figure. It was translated into French by Guy Lefèvre de la Boderie in 1574.

Following the Libro del nuevo cometa, Muñoz published a pamphlet about a lunar eclipse and the Great Comet of 1577 in 1578. His final work was Alphabetum hebraicum cum ratione legendi cum punctis, which was published in 1585 and included a treatise on the use of niqqud. In addition to his published works, he also wrote numerous manuscripts and commentaries on the works of astrologers and mathematicians such as Ptolemy, Euclid, and Al-Qabisi.
