= Albano Sorbelli =

Italian historian, bibliographer and librarian (1875–1944)

- Born: May 2, 1875; Fanano, Kingdom of Italy
- Died: 22 March 1944 (aged 68); Pavullo nel Frignano, Italian Social Republic
- Occupations: Historian, bibliographer and librarian
- Spouse: Fernanda Bonfà (m. 1915)
- Children: 3
- Parent(s): Isidoro Sorbelli and Annunziata Sorbelli (née Zecchini)

Academic background
- Education: University of Bologna
- Doctoral advisor: Pio Carlo Falletti
- Influences: Giosuè Carducci; Pasquale Villari

Academic work
- Discipline: Medieval history
- Institutions: Biblioteca comunale dell'Archiginnasio

Albano Sorbelli (Fanano, 2 May 1875 – Pavullo nel Frignano, 22 March 1944) was an Italian historian, bibliographer and librarian. He was the director of the Biblioteca Comunale of the Archiginnasio of Bologna from 1904 until 1943.

== Biografia ==
A student of Giosuè Carducci and of Pio Carlo Falletti at the University of Bologna, he graduated in Letters and Philosophy in 1898 and later focused on Historical Sciences. In the same university he taught courses on librarianship and bibliography (1925-1944).

Sorbelli was a fundamental figure of the Italian library science. We owe the first prototype of Bologna's library system to him: in 1909 he founded the Biblioteca Popolare (Popular Library); in 1921, with the opening to the public, the work of reorganisation of the library and archives of the Carducci house were completed.

In 1906 he founded the magazine “The Archiginnasio”; and the series “Library of the Archiginnasio”. He was also promoter of an active cultural activity of the institution that he directed, organising important exhibitions and conferences.

The personal bibliographic assets of Albano Sorbelli were donated, at his death, to the Biblioteca Comunale dell’Archiginnasio. The collection consists of around 13,000 volumes and pamphlets, mainly of literary historical topics, with particular attention to the bibliographic studies and history of the Frignano area, of the university and the city of Bologna.

== Partial list of works ==
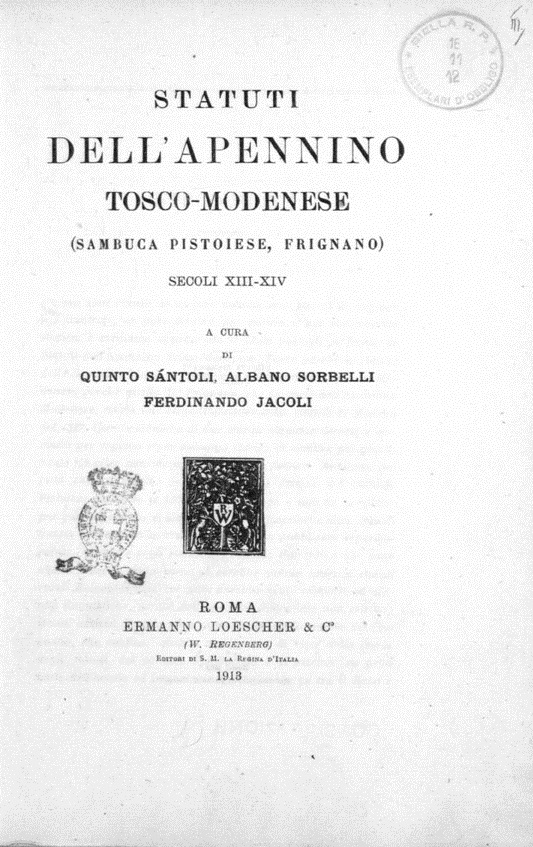
Statuti dell'Appennino tosco-modenese, 1913

- Corpus Chronicorum Bononiensium, in Rerum Italicarum Scriptores (1906ff.)
- Statuti dell'Appennino tosco-modenese (in Italian). Roma: E. Loescher e C. 1913.
- Opuscoli, stampe alla macchia e fogli volanti... (1830-1855). Saggio di bibliografia storica, Firenze, 1927
- Storia della stampa in Bologna, Bologna, 1929
- Le voci "Bibliografia" e "Bibliologia" nell' Enciclopedia Treccani, 1930
- The second volume of the Storia di Bologna, Bologna, Comune, 1938
- From 1935 until his death he curated the national edition of the works of Giosuè Carducci, edited Zanichelli.
