= IRAS 00500+6713 =

Star in the constellation Cassiopeia

IRAS 00500+6713 (Pa 30)
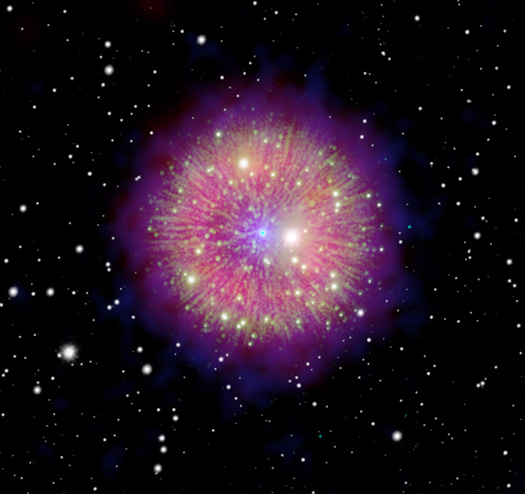
- Composite x-ray, optical, and infrared image

Observation data Epoch J2000.0 Equinox ICRS
- Constellation: Cassiopeia
- Right ascension: 00^{h} 53^{m} 11.21^{s}
- Declination: +67° 30′ 02.4″
- Apparent magnitude (V): 15.4

Astrometry
Proper motion (μ)	RA: −2.258 mas/yr Dec.: −0.0988 mas/yr
Parallax (π)	0.4065±0.0259 mas
Distance	8,000 ± 500 ly (2,500 ± 200 pc)

Details
Mass	1.20±0.17 M_{☉}
Radius	0.155 R_{☉}
Luminosity	36,000 L_{☉}
Temperature	237,000 K

Database references
SIMBAD	data

IRAS 00500+6713 is the catalogued infrared source for an unusual nebula in Cassiopeia, while the central star has a designation WD J005311, with the whole system designated as Pa 30. The central star and its surrounding shell were created by the supernova seen in the year 1181 (SN 1181) as reported by Chinese and Japanese observers. Both the nebula and central star have unique and extreme properties, pointing to their creation by a rare type Iax supernova, where two ultra-dense white dwarfs in-spiral to a collision and explosion.

The Pa 30 system was discovered in 2013 by amateur astronomer Dana Patchick. It was independently discovered by Dr. Vasili Gvaramadze and colleagues who first realized that the central star has extreme properties and proposed that it was created from a merger of two white dwarfs. The star exhibits record-breaking wind speeds of 16,000 km/s and temperatures near 200,000 K. The central star, might be a rapidly-rotating super-Chandrasekhar white dwarf with a mass ≳1.5 M_{☉}.

The central star is surrounded by a nebula packed with hot gas and warm dust. X-ray observations with the XMM-Newton telescope established that the star and its circumstellar nebula are strong X-ray sources. Analysis of X-ray spectra allowed for the first time to determine the chemical composition of the nebula. It was proposed that the nebula is a remnant of a rare type of supernova (SN Iax), and that the SN happened some 1000 years ago.

It has been linked to the historic supernova SN 1181. The star is possibly highly unstable, too massive to remain as a white dwarf, and it is predicted to collapse into a neutron star within ten thousand years.

Both the central star and the nebula contain large amounts of neon, magnesium, silicon, and sulfur (but no hydrogen, helium, or nitrogen), with such requiring an origin in a recent supernova. The surrounding shell has a unique structure with long radial filaments that have expansion velocities of around 1100 km/s. Apparently, the filaments are the tattered remains of the original `slow' supernova ejecta, fragmented and streamed into long wakes by the on-going very fast stellar wind emanating from the central white dwarf.

== Gallery ==
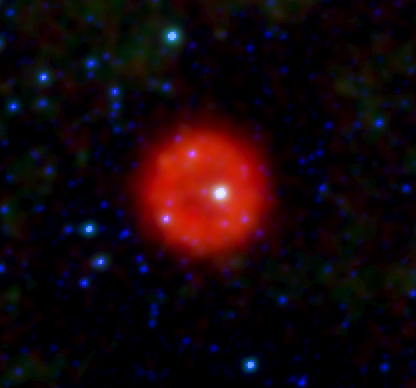
Infrared image from WISE

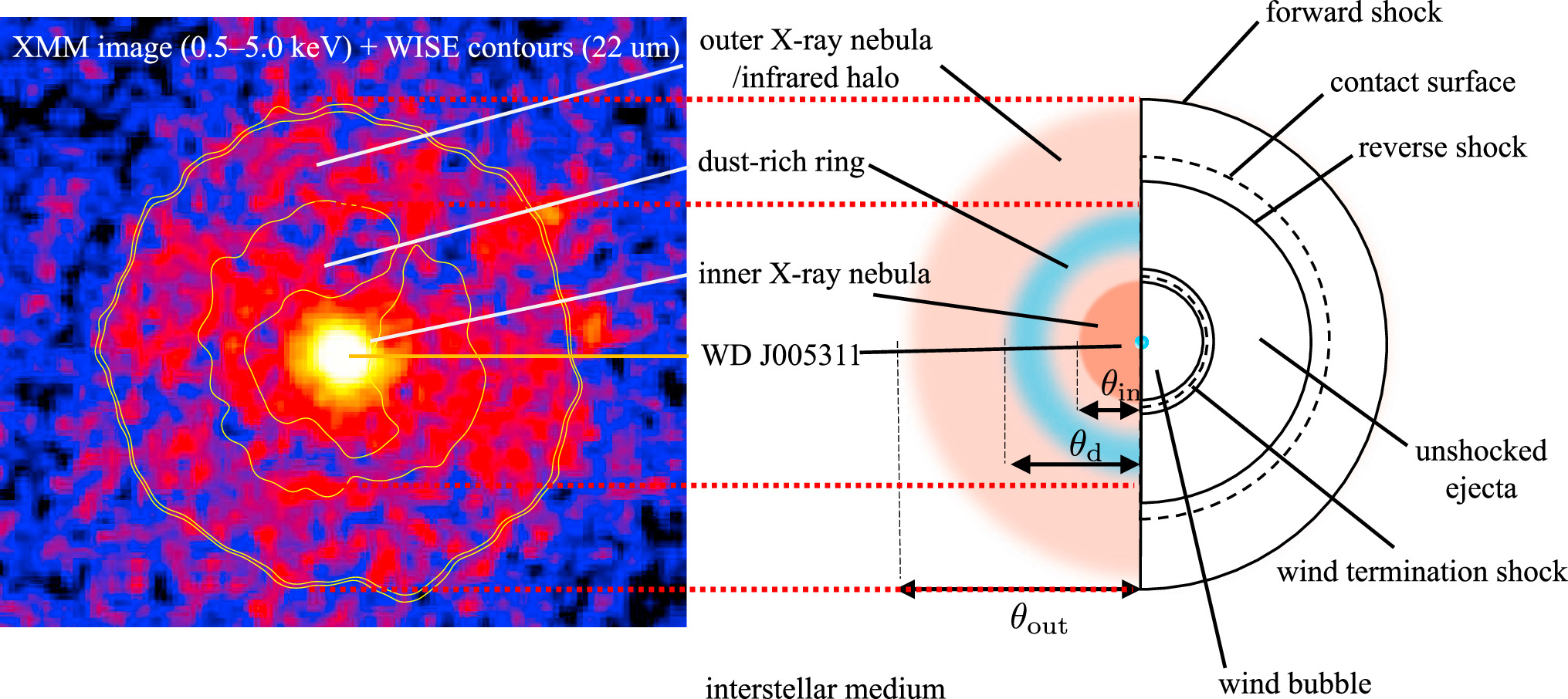
A comparison between an observed image (left panel; X-ray image (XMM) and IR contours (WISE)) and schematic picture of IRAS 00500+671
