= George Volkoff =

Russian-Canadian physicist (1914–2000)

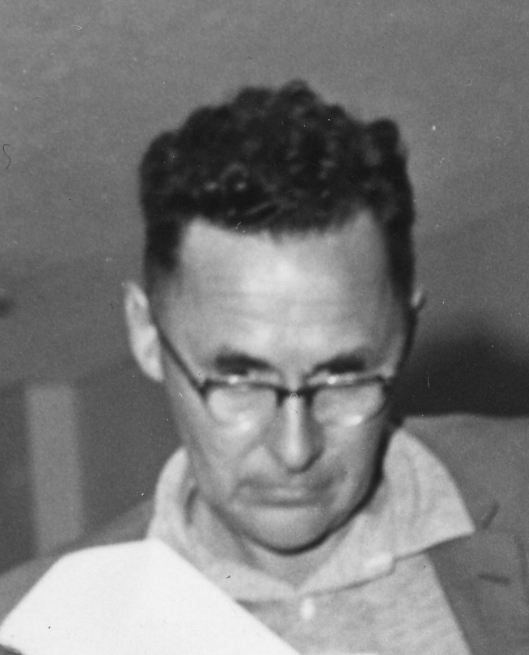
- Born: February 23, 1914; Moscow, Russia
- Died: April 24, 2000 (aged 86); Vancouver, Canada
- Education: University of British Columbia; University of California at Berkeley; Princeton University
- Known for: Tolman–Oppenheimer–Volkoff limit; Tolman–Oppenheimer–Volkoff equation
- Awards: Order of Canada; Order of the British Empire
- Scientific career
- Fields: Physics
- Doctoral advisor: J. Robert Oppenheimer
- Other academic advisors: Richard C. Tolman; Eugene Wigner

George Michael Volkoff, OC MBE FRSC (February 23, 1914 – April 24, 2000) was a Russian-Canadian physicist and academic who helped, with J. Robert Oppenheimer, predict the existence of neutron stars before they were discovered.

== Early life ==
He was born in Moscow, Russia, in 1914. His father, an engineer, relocated his family to Vancouver, British Columbia, Canada in 1924. Unable to find work, his father moved the family again to Harbin, Manchuria, in 1927 to teach at a Russian technical school. In 1936, after Volkoff's mother died, his father returned to Russia but found himself a victim of Joseph Stalin's Great Purge. He was exiled to the arctic camps where he would die.

== Education and academic work ==
Volkoff returned to Vancouver in 1930 and attended the University of British Columbia, receiving a bachelor's degree in physics in 1934 and a master's degree in 1936. He then studied with J. Robert Oppenheimer at the University of California, Berkeley. At this time, Oppenheimer became interested in relativistic astrophysics, in particular, the stability of compact objects. As was typical, Oppenheimer worked with a student in his investigations. For the topic of neutron stars, he picked Volkoff. Together, they published the paper "On Massive Neutron Cores" in 1939. This was Volkoff's first and most famous scientific contribution. Volkoff learned general relativity from the textbook Relativity, Thermodynamics, and Cosmology (1934) by Richard Chace Tolman, who also participated in this research project. Because nuclear interactions were poorly understood at this time, they had to make order-of-magnitude estimates. Oppenheimer and Volkoff showed that there was a limit to how heavy a neutron star could be, now known as the Tolman–Oppenheimer–Volkoff limit, beyond which it would collapse due to its own gravity. They showed that the maximum mass of a neutron star must be between one half and several solar masses. Jocelyn Bell and Anthony Hewish identified the first known neutron star, PSR B1919+21, in 1967. By the 1990s, astronomers had catalogued hundreds of these objects, and their maximum mass was thought to be between 1.5 and 3 solar masses, in the same order of magnitude as the original calculation by Tolman, Oppenheimer, and Volkoff. As of 2025, the heaviest known neutron star is PSR J0952−0607 (2.35 solar masses).

Volkoff earned his Ph.D. in 1940 and subsequently undertook further research on nuclear physics with Eugene Wigner at Princeton University. In 1940, he returned the University of British Columbia as an assistant professor in the Department of Physics. During World War II he worked on the Manhattan Project at the Montreal Laboratory. But except for this he remained at UBC for the rest of his career. At UBC, a topic that interested him was nuclear magnetic resonance. During the early Cold War, he served as a liaison with Russian scientists and translated numerous Russian scientific publications and Russian talks at the Rochester conferences into English. From 1961 to 1970, he was the head of the department. From 1970 to 1979, he was the dean of science.

He was a member of the University of British Columbia Senate for three periods: 1950 to 1954, 1961 to 1963, and 1969 to 1979.

He was the editor of the Canadian Journal of Physics from 1950 to 1956, and president of the Canadian Association of Physicists from 1962 to 1963. He facilitated the development of high-energy physics in Canada and was an early proponent of the Tri-University Meson Facility (TRIUMF).

== Honours ==
In 1946, he chosen to be a member of the Order of the British Empire. UBC gave him an honorary doctorate for his theoretical work on CANDU reactors during the Second World War. In 1994, he was made an Officer of the Order of Canada for having "contributed to the general development of physics in Canada and, in particular, at the University of British Columbia."

He died in Vancouver in 2000, following a series of strokes that began in 1996.

== See also ==
- Oppenheimer–Snyder model
- List of contributors to general relativity
- Timeline of gravitational physics and relativity
