= SN 1054 =

Supernova in the constellation Taurus; visible from 1054 to 1056

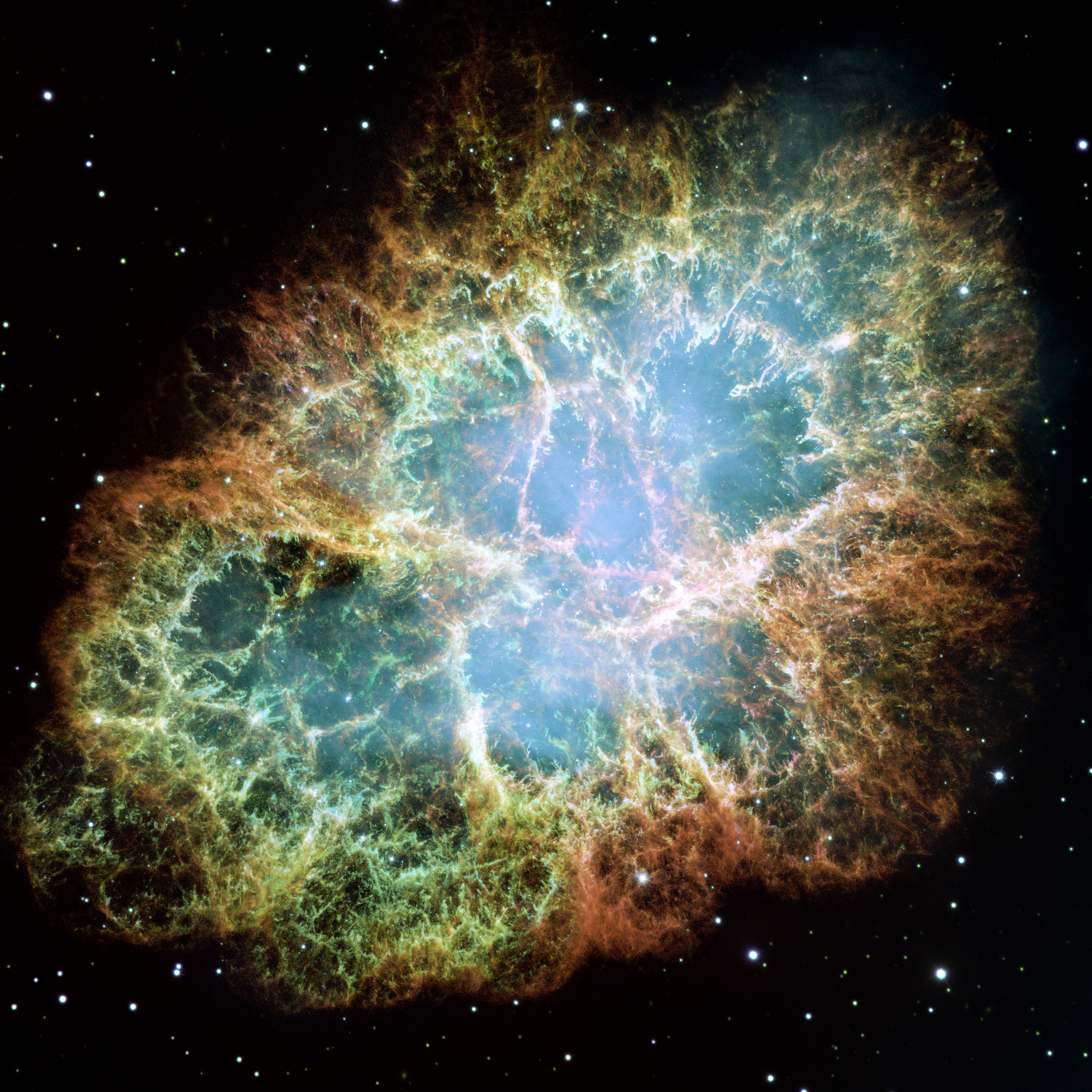
- Giant picture mosaic of the Crab Nebula, the remnants of SN 1054, taken by the Hubble Space Telescope in visible light. Credit: NASA/ESA.
- Type II
- Date: c. 10 July [O.S. c. 4 July] 1054
- Constellation: Taurus
- Right ascension: 5^{h} 34.5^{m}
- Declination: +22° 01'
- Epoch: ?
- Galactic coordinates: G.184.6–5.8
- Distance: 6.5 kly (2.0 kpc)
- Remnant: Pulsar
- Host: Milky Way
- Progenitor: Unknown
- Progenitor type: Unknown
- Colour (B-V): Unknown
- Peak apparent magnitude: −6
- Other designations: Crab Supernova, SN 1054
- Preceded by: SN 1006
- Followed by: SN 1181
- Related media on Commons

SN 1054, the Crab Supernova, is a supernova that was first observed on c. 10 July [O.S. c. 4 July] 1054, and remained visible until c. 12 April [O.S. c. 6 April] 1056.^{α}

The event was recorded in contemporary Chinese astronomy, and references to it are also found in a later (13th-century) Japanese document and in a document from the Islamic world. Furthermore, there are a number of proposed references from European sources recorded in the 15th century, as well as a pictograph associated with the Ancestral Puebloan culture found near the Peñasco Blanco site in New Mexico, United States. The pyramids at Cahokia in the midwestern United States may have been built in response to the supernova's appearance in the sky.

The remnant of SN 1054, which consists of debris ejected during the explosion, is known as the Crab Nebula. It is located in the sky near the star Zeta Tauri (ζ Tauri). The core of the exploding star formed a pulsar, called the Crab Pulsar (or PSR B0531+21). The nebula and the pulsar that it contains are some of the most studied astronomical objects outside the Solar System. It is one of the few Galactic supernovae where the date of the explosion is well known. The two objects are the most luminous in their respective categories. For these reasons, and because of the important role it has repeatedly played in the modern era, SN 1054 is one of the best-known supernovae in the history of astronomy.

The Crab Nebula is easily observed by amateur astronomers thanks to its brightness, and was also catalogued early on by professional astronomers, long before its true nature was understood and identified. When the French astronomer Charles Messier watched for the return of Halley's Comet in 1758, he confused the nebula for the comet, as he was unaware of the former's existence. Motivated by this error, he created his catalogue of non-cometary nebulous objects, the Messier Catalogue, to avoid such mistakes in the future. The nebula is catalogued as the first Messier object, or M1.

== Identification of the supernova ==
The Crab Nebula was identified as the supernova remnant of SN 1054 between 1921 and 1942, at first speculatively (1920s), with some plausibility by 1939, and beyond reasonable doubt by Jan Oort in 1942.

In 1921, Carl Otto Lampland was the first to announce that he had seen changes in the structure of the Crab Nebula. This announcement occurred at a time when the nature of the nebulae in the sky was completely unknown. Their nature, size and distance were subject to debate. Observing changes in such objects allows astronomers to determine whether their spatial extension is "small" or "large", in the sense that notable fluctuations to an object as vast as our Milky Way cannot be seen over a small time period, such as a few years, whereas such substantial changes are possible if the size of the object does not exceed a diameter of a few light-years. Lampland's comments were confirmed some weeks later by John Charles Duncan, an astronomer at the Mount Wilson Observatory. He benefited from photographic material obtained with equipment and emulsions that had not changed since 1909; as a result the comparison with older snapshots was easy and emphasized a general expansion of the cloud. The points were moving away from the centre, and did so faster as they got further from it.

Also in 1921, Knut Lundmark compiled the data for the "guest stars" mentioned in the Chinese chronicles known in the West. He based this on older works, having analysed various sources such as the Wenxian Tongkao, studied for the first time from an astronomical perspective by Jean-Baptiste Biot in the middle of the 19th century. Lundmark gives a list of 60 suspected novae, then the generic term for a stellar explosion, in fact covering what is now understood as two distinct phenomena, novae and supernovae. The nova of 1054, already mentioned by the Biots in 1843, is part of the list. It stipulates the location of this guest star in a note at the bottom of the page as being "close to NGC 1952", one of the names for the Crab Nebula, but it does not seem to create an explicit link between them.

In 1928, Edwin Hubble was the first to note that the changing aspect of the Crab Nebula, which was growing bigger in size, suggests that it is the remains of a stellar explosion. He realised that the apparent speed of change in its size signifies that the explosion which it comes from occurred only nine centuries ago (as observed on Earth), which puts the date of the explosion in the period covered by Lundmark's compilation. He also noted that the only possible nova in the region of Taurus (where the cloud is located) is that of 1054, whose age is estimated to correspond to an explosion dating from the start of the second millennium.

Hubble therefore deduced, correctly, that this cloud was the remains of the explosion which was observed by Chinese astronomers.

Hubble's comment remained relatively unknown as the physical phenomenon of the explosion was not known at the time. Eleven years later, when the fact that supernovae are very bright phenomena was highlighted by Walter Baade and Fritz Zwicky and when their nature was suggested by Zwicky, Nicholas Mayall proposed that the star of 1054 was actually a supernova, based on the speed of expansion of the cloud, measured by spectroscopy, which allows astronomers to determine its physical size and distance, which he estimated at 5000 light-years. This was under the assumption that the velocities of expansion along the line of sight and perpendicularly to it were identical. Based on the reference to the brightness of the star which featured in the first documents discovered in 1934, he deduced that it was a supernova rather than a nova.

This deduction was subsequently refined, which pushed Mayall and Jan Oort in 1942 to analyse historic accounts relating to the guest star more closely (see § Historical records below). These new accounts, globally and mutually concordant, confirm the initial conclusions by Mayall and Oort in 1939 and the identification of the guest star of 1054 is established beyond all reasonable doubt. Most other historical supernovas are not confirmed so conclusively: supernovas of the first millennium (SN 185, SN 386 and SN 393) are established on the basis of a single document each, and so they cannot be confirmed. Other historical supernovae of which there are written accounts which precede the invention of the telescope (SN 1006, SN 1181, SN 1572 and SN 1604) are however established with reasonable certitude. Telescope-era supernovae are of course associated with full certitude with their remnant, when one is observed, but none is known within the Milky Way.

== Historical records ==
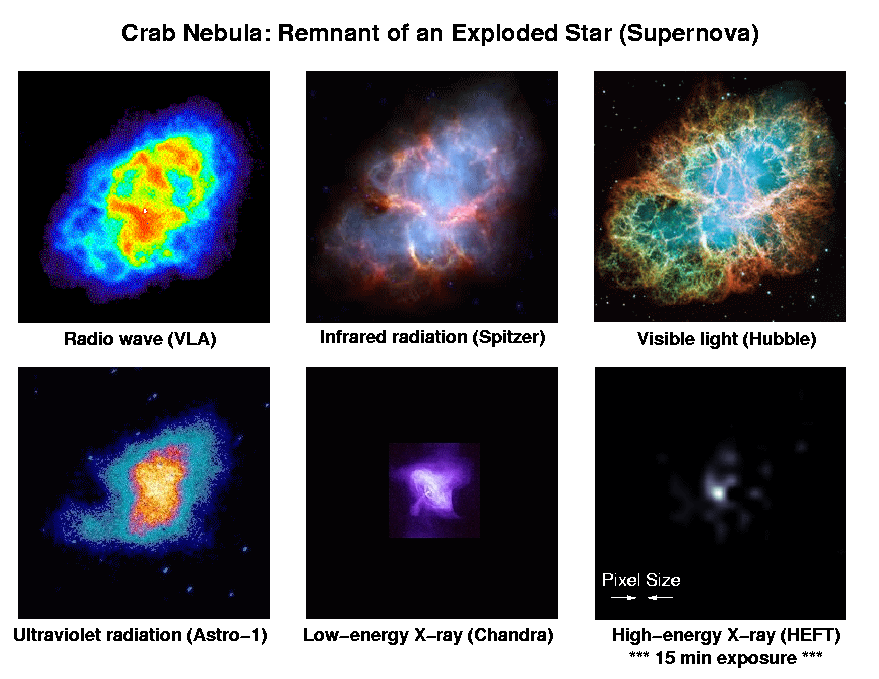
The Crab Nebula is a remnant of an exploded star. This is the Crab Nebula in various energy bands, including a hard X-ray image from the HEFT data taken during its 2005 observation run. Each image is 6' wide.

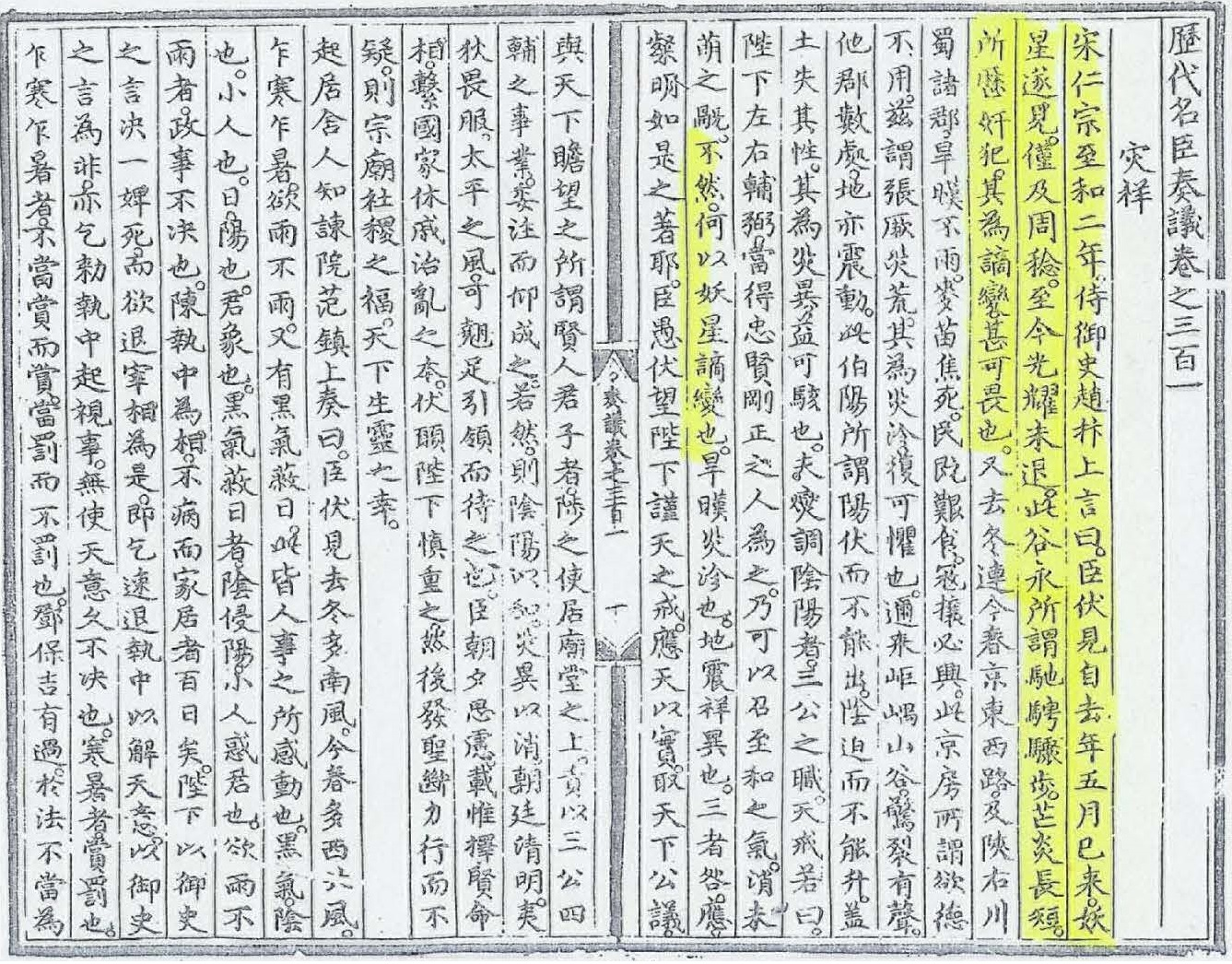
The guest star reported by Chinese astronomers in 1054 is identified as SN 1054. The highlighted passages refer to the supernova.

SN 1054 is one of eight supernovae in the Milky Way that can be identified because written testimony describing the explosion has survived. In the nineteenth century, astronomers began to take an interest in the historic records. They compiled and examined the records as part of their research on recent novae, comets, and later, the supernovae.

The first Westerners to attempt a systematic compilation of records from China were the father and son Biot. In 1843, the sinologist Édouard Biot translated for his father, the astronomer and physicist Jean-Baptiste Biot, passages from the astronomical treatise of the 348-volume Chinese encyclopaedia, the Wenxian Tongkao.

Almost 80 years later in 1921, Knut Lundmark undertook a similar effort based on a greater number of sources. In 1942, Jan Oort, convinced that the Crab Nebula was the "guest star" of 1054 described by the Chinese, asked sinologist J.J.L. Duyvendak to help him compile new evidence on the observation of the event.

=== Chinese astronomy ===
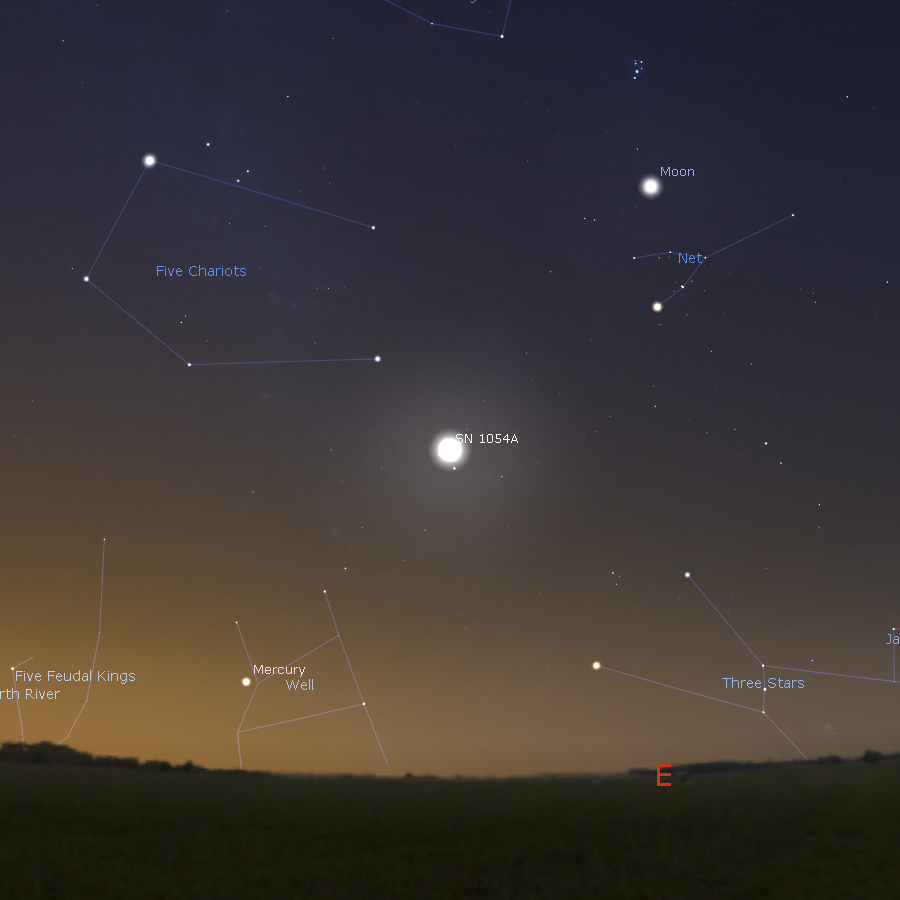
Simulated image of supernova SN 1054 at the position of the modern Crab Nebula, as presumably would have been observed from the capital of the Song dynasty at Kaifeng, China during the morning of c. 4 July 1054.

Star-like objects that appeared temporarily in the sky were generically called "guest stars" (kè xīng 客星) by Chinese astronomers. The guest star of 1054 occurred during the reign of the Emperor Renzong of the Song dynasty (960–1279). The relevant year is recorded in Chinese documents as "the first year of the Zhihe era". Zhihe was an era name used during the reign of Emperor Renzong, and corresponds to the years 1054–1056, so the first year of the Zhihe era corresponds to the year 1054.

Some of the Chinese accounts are well preserved and detailed. The oldest and most detailed accounts are from Song Huiyao and Song Shi, historiographical works of which the extant text was redacted perhaps within a few decades of the event. There are also some later records, redacted in the 13th century, which are not necessarily independent of the older ones. Three accounts are apparently related because they describe the angular distance from the guest star to Zeta Tauri as "perhaps several inches away", but they are in apparent disagreement about the date of appearance of the star. The older two mention the day jichou 己丑, but the third, the Xu Zizhi Tongjian Changbian, the day yichou 乙丑. These terms refer to the Chinese sexagenary cycle, corresponding to numbers 26 and 2 of the cycle, which corresponds, in the context where they are cited, respectively, to 4 July and 10 June. As the redaction of the third source is of considerably later date (1280) and the two characters are similar, this is easily explained as a transcription error, the historical date being jichou 己丑, 4 July.

The description of the guest star's location as "to the south-east of Tianguan, perhaps several inches away" has perplexed modern astronomers, because the Crab Nebula is not situated in the south-east, but to the north-west of Zeta Tauri.

The duration of visibility is explicitly mentioned in chapter 12 of Song Shi, and slightly less accurately, in the Song Huiyao. The last sighting was on 6 April 1056, after a total period of visibility of 642 days. This duration is supported by the Song Shi. The Song Huiyao by contrast mentions a visibility of the guest star of only 23 days, but this is after mentioning visibility during daylight. This period of 23 days applies in all likelihood solely to visibility during the day, which naturally was much shorter.

==== Sources ====
The Song Huiyao (literally "Collected important documents of the Song dynasty") covers the period 960–1220. Huiyao is a traditional form of history books in China which aimed mainly to preserve primary sources, and as such are important sources supplementing the official Twenty-Four Histories. The Song dynasty had a specific government department dedicated to compiling the Huiyao, and some 2,200 volumes were published in ten batches during the Song dynasty. However, most of these documents were lost by the time of the Qing Dynasty except for the synopsis and a relatively small portion preserved as part of the imperial Yongle Encyclopedia. In 1809, the portion preserved in the Yongle Encyclopedia was extracted and re-published as the Song Huiyao Jigao (the "draft extract of the Song Huiyao"). Subsequent scholars have worked on the project further and the current edition dates from 1936.

This document recounts the observation of the guest star, focusing on the astrological aspect but also giving important information on the visibility of the star, by day and by night.

Zhihe era, first year, seventh lunar month, 22nd day. [...] Yang Weide declared: "I humbly observe that a guest star has appeared; above the star there is a feeble yellow glimmer. If one examines the divination regarding the Emperor, the interpretation [of the presence of this guest star] is the following: The fact that the star has not overrun Bi and that its brightness must represent a person of great value. I demand that the Office of Historiography is informed of this." All officials congratulated the Emperor, who ordered his congratulations be [back] forwarded to the Office of Historiography. First year of the era of Jiayou, third lunar month, the director of the Astronomical Office said "The guest star has disappeared, which means the departure of the host [that it represents]." Previously, during the first year of the Zhihe era, during the fifth lunar month, it had appeared at dawn, in the direction of the east, under the watch of Tiānguān (天關, Zeta Tauri). It had been seen in daylight, like Venus. It had rays stemming in all directions, and its colour was reddish white. Altogether visible for 23 days.

The Song Shi is the official annals of the Song dynasty. Chapter 12 mentions the guest star, not its appearance but rather the moment of its disappearance. The corresponding entry dated 6 April 1056 indicates:

Jiayou era, first year, third lunar month, xinwei day, the director of the Office of Astronomy reported during the fifth lunar month of the first year of the Zhihe era, a guest star had appeared at dawn, in the direction of the east, under the watch of Tianguan. Now it has disappeared.

In chapter 56 ("Astronomical treaty") of the same document, the guest star is again mentioned in a chapter dedicated to this type of phenomenon, this time focusing on its appearance,

Zhihe era of the reign, first year, fifth lunar month, jichou day. A guest star has appeared to the south-east of Tianguan, perhaps several inches away. After a year or more, it gradually disappeared.

The Xu Zizhi Tongjian Changbian ("Long compilation of the continuation of the Zizhi Tongjian"), a book covering the period of 960–1126 and written 40 years or so later by Li Tao (1114–1183), contains the oldest Chinese testimonies relating to the observation of the star. It was rediscovered in 1970 by the specialist in Chinese civilisations Ho Peng Yoke and collaborators. It is relatively imprecise in the case of the explosion of SN 1054. A loose translation of what was stated:

First year of the Zhihe era, fifth lunar month, ji-chou day. A guest star has appeared to the south-east of Tianguan, perhaps several inches away [of this star]. (The star disappeared in the third lunar month of the first year of the Jiayou era.)

There is an account of the star from the Liao dynasty, which ruled in the area around northeast China from 907 to 1125. The book in question, the Qidan Guo Zhi, was compiled by Ye Longli in 1247. It includes various astronomical notes, some of which are clearly copied from the Song Shi. This entry referring to the star of 1054 seems unique:

Chongxi era of the reign of [King Xingzong], twenty-third year eighth lunar moon, the ruler of the realm is dead. It happened before a solar eclipse at noon, and a guest star appeared. The highest officer at the Office of History, Liu Yishou had said "These are omens of the death of the King." This prediction has been realised.

The account of Qidan Guo Zhi alluded to the notable astronomical events that preceded the death of King Xingzong. Various historical documents allow us to establish the date of death of the Emperor Xingzong as 28 August 1055, during the eighth lunar month of the twenty-fourth (and not twenty-third) year of his reign. The dates of the two astronomical events mentioned (the eclipse and the appearance of the guest star) are not specified, but were probably before the obituary (2 or 3 years at most). Two solar eclipses were visible shortly before that date in the Khitan kingdom, on 13 November 1053 and 10 May 1054. Of these, only one occurred around noon, that of 13 November; it seems likely that this is what the document mentions. As for the guest star, only a rough estimate of location is given, corresponding to the moon mansion Mao. This mansion is situated just east of where the star appeared, as mentioned in the other testimonies. Since no other known significant astronomical event occurred in this region of the sky during the two years that preceded the death of Xingzong, it seems likely that the text is actually referring to the star of 1054.

The Wenxian Tongkao is the first East Asian source that came to the attention of Western astronomers; it was translated by Édouard Biot in 1843. This source, compiled by Ma Duanlin in 1280, is relatively brief. The text is very close to that of the Song Shi:

Zhihe era of the reign, first year, fifth lunar month, ji-chou day. A guest star has appeared to the south-east of Tiānguān, perhaps several inches away. After a year or more, it gradually disappeared.

==== Identity of Tianguan ====
The asterisms (or "constellations") of Chinese astronomy were catalogued around the 2nd century BC. The asterisms with the brightest stars in the sky were compiled in a work called Shi Shi, which also includes Tianguan. Identification of Tianguan is comparatively easy, as it is indicated that it is located at the foot of the Five Chariots asterism, the nature of which is left in hardly any doubt by representation on maps of the Chinese sky: it consists of a large pentagon containing the bright stars of the Auriga. As Tianguan is also represented to the north of the Three Stars asterism, the composition of which is well known, corresponding to the bright stars of Orion, its possible localisation is strongly restricted to the immediate proximity of the star ζ Tauri, located between "Five Chariots" and "Three Stars". This star, of medium brightness (apparent magnitude of 3.3), is the only star of its level of brightness in this area of the sky (there is no other star that is brighter than an apparent magnitude of 4.5 within 7 degrees of ζ Tauri), and therefore the only one likely to figure among the asterisms of "Shi Shi". All of these elements, along with some others, allow "Tianguan" to be confirmed beyond reasonable doubt as corresponding to the star ζ Tauri.

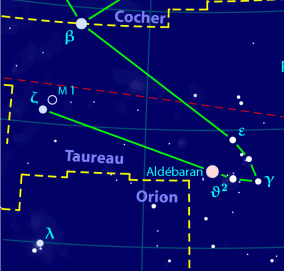
Northeast region of the Taurus constellation, with ζ and β Tauri stars and the location of the supernova of 1054 between them (M1).

==== Position relative to Tianguan ====
Three Chinese documents indicate that the guest star was located "perhaps a few inches" South-East of Tianguan. Song Shi and Song Huiyao stipulate that it "was standing guard" for the asterism, corresponding to the star ζ Tauri. The "South-East" orientation has a simple astronomical meaning, the celestial sphere having, like the Earth's globe, both north and south celestial poles, the "South-East" direction thus corresponding to a "bottom-left" location in relation to the reference object (in this case, the star ζ Tauri) when it appears at the South. However, this "South-East" direction has long left modern astronomers perplexed in the context of this event: the logical remnant of the supernova corresponding to the guest star is the Crab Nebula, but it is not situated to the southeast of ζ Tauri, rather in the opposite direction, to the northwest.

The term "perhaps a few inches" (ke shu cun in the Latin transliteration) is relatively uncommon in Chinese astronomical documents. The first term, ke, is translated as "approximately" or "perhaps", the latter being currently preferred. The second term, shu, means "several", and more specifically any number between three and nine (limits included). Finally, cun resembles a unit of measurement for angles translated by the term "inch". It is part of a group of three angular units, zhang (also written chang), chi ("foot") and cun ("inch"). Different astronomical documents indicate without much possible discussion that a zhang corresponds to ten chi, and that one chi corresponds to ten cun. The angular units are not the ones used to determine stars' coordinates, which are given in terms of du, an angular unit corresponding to the average angular distance travelled by the sun per day, which corresponds to around 360/365.25 degrees, in other words almost one degree. The use of different angular units can be surprising, but it is similar to the current situation in modern astronomy, where the angular unit used to measure angular distances between two points is certainly the same as for declination (the degree), but is different for right ascension (which is expressed in angular hours; an angular hour corresponds to exactly 15 degrees). In Chinese astronomy, right ascension and declination have the same unit, which is not the one used for other angular distances. The reason for this choice to use different units in the Chinese world is not well known.

===== Meaning of units =====
However, the exact value of these new units (zhang, chi and cun) was never stipulated, but can be deduced by the context in which they are used. For example, the spectacular passing of Halley's Comet in 837 indicates that the tail of the comet measured 8 zhang. Even if it is not possible to know the angular size of the comet at the time it passed, it is certain that 8 zhang correspond to 180 degrees at the most (maximum visible angle on the celestial sphere), which means that one zhang can hardly exceed 20 degrees, and therefore one cun cannot exceed 0.2 degrees. A more rigorous estimation was made from 1972 on the basis of references of minimal separations expressed in chi or cun between two stars in the case of various conjunctions. The results suggest that one cun is between 0.1 and 0.2 degrees and that one chi is between 0.44 and 2.8 degrees, a range which is compatible with the estimations for one cun. A more solid estimation error is that it is generally accepted that one chi is in the order of one degree (or one du), and that one cun is in the order of one tenth of a degree. The expression "perhaps a few inches" therefore suggests an angular distance in the order of one degree or less.

===== Problems with description =====
If all the available elements strongly suggest that the star of 1054 was a supernova, and that in the area next to where the star was seen, there is a remnant of a supernova which has all of the characteristics expected of an object that is around 1,000 years old, a major problem arises: the new star is described as being to the South-East of Tianguan, while the Crab Nebula is to the North-East. This problem has been known since the 1940s and has long been unsolved. In 1972 for example, Ho Peng Yoke and his colleagues suggested that the Crab Nebula was not the product of the explosion of 1054, but that the true remnant was to the South-East, as indicated in several Chinese sources. For this, they envisaged that the angular unit cun corresponds to a considerable angle of 1 or 2 degrees, meaning that the distance from the remnant to ζ Tauri was therefore considerable. Aside from the fact that this theory does not account for the large angular sizes of certain comets, expressed in zhang, it comes up against the fact that there it does not make sense to measure the gap between a guest star and a star located so far away from it, when there are closer asterisms that could be used.

In their controversial article (see European sightings, below) Collins and his colleagues make another suggestion: on the morning of 4 July, the star ζ Tauri was not bright enough and too low on the horizon to be visible. If the guest star, which was located close to it, was visible, it is only because its brightness was comparable to Venus. However, there was another star, brighter and higher on the horizon, which was possibly visible, for reference: Beta Tauri (β Tauri). This star is located at around 8 degrees north-north-west of ζ Tauri. The Crab Nebula is south-south-east of β Tauri. Collins et al. suggest therefore that at the time of its discovery, the star was seen to the south-east of β Tauri, and that as the days passed and visibility improved, astronomers were able to see that it was in fact a lot closer to ζ Tauri, but that the direction "south-east" used for the first star was kept in error.

The solution to this problem was suggested (without proof) by A. Breen and D. McCarthy in 1995 and proved very convincingly by D. A. Green et F. R. Stephenson (2003). The term "stand on guard" obviously signifies a proximity between the two stars, but also means a general orientation: a guest star "standing on guard" for a fixed star is systematically located below it. In order to support this theory, Green and Stephenson investigated other entries in Song Shi, which also includes reference to "standing on guard". They selected entries relating to conjunctions betweens the stars identified and planets, of which the trajectory can be calculated without difficulty and with great precision on the indicated dates. Of the 18 conjunctions analysed, spreading from 1172 (the Jupiter–Regulus conjunction on 5 December) to 1245 (the Saturn–Gamma Virginis conjunction on 17 May), the planet was more to the north (in the sense of a lower declination) in 15 cases, and in the three remaining cases, it was never in the south quadrant of the star.

In addition, Stephenson and Clark (1977) had already highlighted such an inversion of direction in a planetary conjunction: on 13 September 1253, an entry in the astronomical report Koryo-sa indicated that Mars had hidden the star to the south-east of the twenty-eight mansions sign Ghost (Delta Cancri), while in reality, it approached the star north-west of the asterism (Eta Cancri).

=== Meigetsuki (Japan) ===
The oldest and most detailed record from Japan is in the Meigetsuki, the diary of Fujiwara no Teika, a poet and courtier. There are two other Japanese documents, presumably dependent on the Meigetsuki:

- The 14th century Ichidai Yoki: The description is very similar to the Meigetsuki, omitting several details (hour of apparition, and possibly erroneous parts of the lunar month). The short text also contains many typographical errors.
- The 17th-century Dainihonshi, containing very little information. The brevity contrasts with the more detailed descriptions of "guest stars" (supernovas) of 1006 and 1181.

The Meigetsuki places the event in the fourth lunar moon, one month earlier than the Chinese texts. Whatever the exact date during this month, there seems to be a contradiction between this period and the observation of the guest star: the star was close to the sun, making daytime and nighttime observation impossible. The visibility in daylight as described by the Chinese texts is thus validated by the Japanese documents, and is consistent with a period of moderate visibility, which implies that the star's period of diurnal visibility was very short. In contrast, the day of the cycle given in the Chinese documents is compatible with the months that they state, reinforcing the idea that the month on the Japanese document is incorrect. The study of other medieval supernovas (SN 1006 and SN 1181) reveals a proximity in the dates of discovery of a guest star in China and Japan, although clearly based on different sources.

Fujiwara no Teika's interest in the guest star seems to have come accidentally whilst observing a comet in December 1230, which prompted him to search for evidence of past guest stars, among those SN 1054 (as well as SN 1006 and SN 1181, the two other historic supernovas from the early second millennium). The entry relating to SN 1054 can be translated as:

Tengi era of the emperor Go-Reizei, second year, fourth lunar month, after the middle period of ten days. At chou [a Chinese term for 1–3am], a guest star appeared in the degrees of the moon mansions of Zuixi and Shen. It has been viewed in the direction of the East and has emerged from the Tianguan star. It was as big as Jupiter.

The source used by Fujiwara no Teika is the records of Yasutoshi Abe (Onmyōdō doctor), but it seems to have been based, for all the astronomical events he has recorded, on documents of Japanese origin. The date he gives is prior to the third part of ten days of the lunar month mentioned, which corresponds to the period of between 30 May and 8 June 1054 of the Julian calendar, which is around one month earlier than Chinese documentation. This difference is usually attributed to an error in the lunar months (fourth place and fifth place). The location of the guest star, clearly straddling the moon mansions Shen and Zuixi, corresponds to what would be expected of a star appearing in the immediate vicinity of Tianguan.

=== Ibn Butlan (Iraq) ===
While SN 1006, which was significantly brighter than SN 1054, was mentioned by several Arab chroniclers, there exist no Arabic reports relating to the rather faint SN 1181. Only one Arabic account has been found concerning SN 1054, whose brightness is between those of the last two stars mentioned. This account, discovered in 1978, is that of a Nestorian Christian doctor, Ibn Butlan, transcribed in the Uyun al-Anba, a book on detailed biographies of physicians in the Islamic world compiled by Ibn Abi Usaybi'a (1194–1270) in the mid-thirteenth century. This is a translation of the passage in question:

I copied the following hand written testimony [that of Ibn Butlan]. He stated: "One of the famous epidemics of our time has occurred when a spectacular star appeared in [the zodiac star] Gemini, of the year 446 [of the Muslim calendar]. In the autumn of that year, fourteen thousand people were buried in Constantinople. Thereafter, in the middle of the summer of 447, the majority of the people of Fostat and all foreigners died". He [Ibn Butlan] continues: "While this spectacular star appeared in the sign of Gemini [...] it caused the epidemic in Fostat by the Nile being low when it appeared in 445 [sic]."

The three years cited (AH 445, 446, 447) refer, respectively, to: 23 April 1053 – 11 April 1054, 12 April 1054 – 1 April 1055, and 2 April 1055 – 20 March 1056. There is an apparent inconsistency in the year of occurrence of the star, first announced as 446, then 445. This problem is solved by reading other entries in the book, which quite explicitly specify that the Nile was low at 446. This year of the Muslim calendar ran from 12 April 1054 to 1 April 1055, which is compatible with the appearance of the star in July 1054, as its location (admittedly rather vague), is in the astrological sign of Gemini (which, due to axial precession, covers the eastern part of the Constellation Taurus). The date of the event in 446 is harder to determine, but the reference to the level of the Nile refers to the period preceding its annual flood, which happens during the summer.

=== Suggested European sightings ===
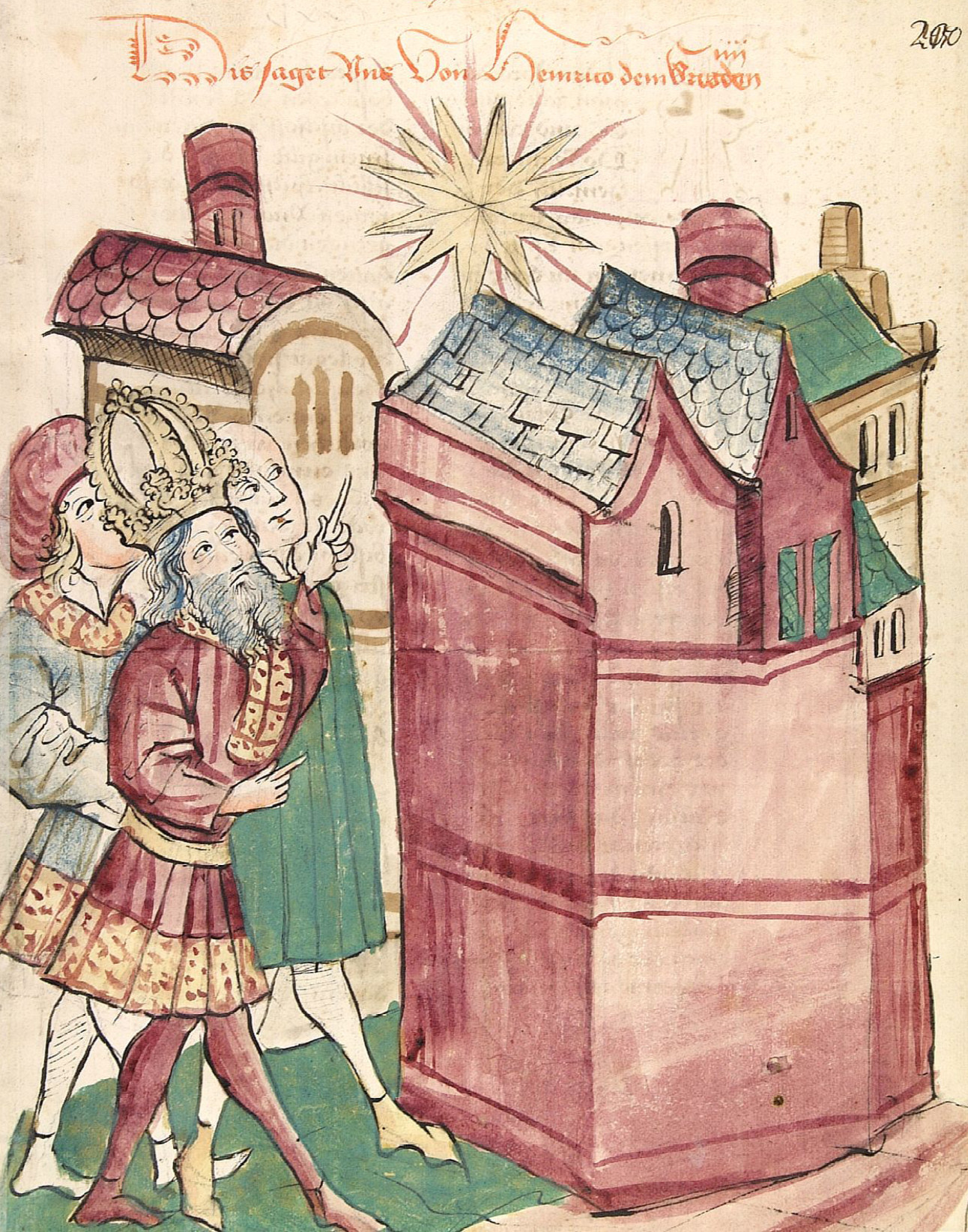
Henry III, Holy Roman Emperor sees the newly risen star above the roofs of Tivoli pointing up to it.

Since 1980, several European documents have been identified as possible observations of the supernova.

The first such suggestion was made in 1980 by Umberto Dall'Olmo (1925–1980). The following passage which reports an astronomical sighting is taken from an account compiled by Jacobus Malvecius in the 15th century:

And in those days a star of immense brightness appeared within the circle of the Moon a few days after its separation from the Sun.

The date this passage refers to is not explicit, however, and by means of a reference to an earthquake in Brescia 11 April 1064, it would seem ten years too late. Dall'Olmo suggests this is due to a transcription error. Another candidate is the Cronaca Rampona, proposed in 1981, which however also indicates a date several years after the event, in 1058 instead of 1054.

The European candidate documents are imprecise, especially lacking in astronomical terms likely due to European scholars having lost many of the astronomical skills of antiquity. In contrast, the Chinese accounts pin-point within a degree where the supernova occurred, as well as how long it lasted and roughly how bright it became.

The lack of accounts from European chroniclers has long raised questions. In fact, it is known that the supernova of 1006 was recorded in a large number of European documents, albeit not in astronomical terms. Among the proposed explanations for the lack of European accounts of SN 1054, its concurrence with the East-West Schism is prominent. In fact, the date of the excommunication of the Patriarch of Constantinople Michael I Cerularius (16 July) corresponds to the star reaching its maximum brightness and being visible in the daytime. Among the six proposed European documents, one does not seem to correspond to the year of the supernova (the chronicle of Jacobus Malvecius). Another (the Cronaca Rampona) has large dating and internal coherence problems. The four others are relatively precisely dated, but they date from Spring and not Summer 1054, that is to say before the conjunction between the supernova and the Sun (although a Khitan document suggests this may have been possible). Three of the documents (the chronicle of Jacobus Malvecius, the Cronaca Rampona and the Armenian chronicle) make reference relatively explicitly to conjunctions between the Moon and stars, of which one is identified (Jupiter, in the Armenian chronicle). The other three documents are very unclear.

In 1999, George W. Collins and his colleagues defended the plausibility of European sighting of SN 1054. They argue that the records suggest that European sightings even predate Chinese and Japanese reports by more than two months (April 1054). These authors emphasize the problems associated with the Chinese reports, especially the position of the supernova relative to Zeta Tauri. They also adduce a Khitan document which they suggest might establish observation of the supernova at the time of the solar eclipse of 10 May 1054 (which would corrobate the "late" date of Chinese observation of the event). Conversely, they interpret the European documents, taken in conjunction, as plausibly establishing that an unusual astronomical phenomenon was visible in Europe in the spring of 1054, i.e. even before the Sun's conjunction with Zeta Tauri. They also surmise that the correct year in the report by Ibn Butlan is AH 445 (23 April 1053 – 11 April 1054) rather than AH 446 (12 April 1054 – 1 April 1055).

The publication by Collins et al. was criticized by Stephenson and Green (2003). These authors insist that the problems with the Chinese and Japanese documents can easily be resolved philologically (as common copyists' mistakes) and need not indicate unreliability of the Chinese observations. Stephenson and Green condemn attempts at uncovering European sightings of the supernova as it were at any cost as suffering from confirmation bias, "anxious to ensure that this event was recorded by Europeans". They also reject the idea of the Khitan document referring to the supernova as a mistake based in a translation of the document.

==== The Cronaca Rampona ====
The European account of a supernova sighting that is considered the most plausible is part of a medieval chronicle from the region of Bologna, the Cronaca Rampona. This text came to astronomers' attention in 1972, and was interpreted as a possible sighting of the supernova in 1981, and again in 1999. The relevant part of the chronicle translates to:

In AD 1058, Pope Stephen IX has come to the throne [...] Also in this year of Christ 1058, Henry III reigned [or "lived"] for 49 years. He went to Rome for the first time in the month of May. At this time, famine and death was upon the whole world. He stayed in the province of Tibur for three days in the month of June [...] At that time, a very brightly-shining star (stella clarissima) entered into the circle [or the circuit] of the new moon, in the thirteenth calends at the beginning of the night.

Before even looking for potential problems in the astronomical last sentence of the passage, skeptics point out at least two discrepancies in the dating: Pope Stephen IX became Pope in 1057, not 1058, and Emperor Henry III, Holy Roman Emperor was born in 1017, 39 and not 49 years before 1058, his reign having started in 1039 (as King of the Romans, then as emperor of the Romans from 1046 after Pope Clement II consecrated him during his brief pontificate). Henry III died in 1056, and his reign did not overlap with Stephen IX's papacy. It seems likely that the text underwent various alterations, as its date format uses a mix of Roman and Arabic numerals (the number 1058 is for instance written as Ml8) which was common in the 15th century when the Cronaca Rampona was assembled, but not in the 11th century when the events occurred. Associating the stella clarissima with the 1054 supernova also requires assuming that its entry in the Cronaca Rampona is out of order, as the entries are otherwise in chronological order and the two previous entries are later than 1054 (in order, the previous entries refer to 1046, 1049, 1051, 1055, 1056, all written in a mix of Arab and Roman characters, namely Mxl6, Mxl9, Mli, Mlv and Ml6). Additionally, the date of the new moon is discrepant. Calculating the phase of the moon for every day of 1054 and converting the calends, which refer to the Roman calendar, to our Gregorian calendar shows that no month of that year had a new moon on the thirteenth day of its Calends. All of this strongly contrasts with the general precision of references to eclipse dates in medieval European chronicles: a study of 48 partial or total solar eclipses from 733 to 1544 finds that 42 dates out of 48 are correct, and of the six remaining, three are incorrect by one of two days and the three others give the correct day and month, but a wrong year. Even assuming that the stated event nevertheless corresponds to May or June 1054, and that it describes a conjunction between the already visible supernova and the moon, a final problem arises: the moon did not pass very close to the location of the supernova during two those months.

It is therefore possible that the account instead describes an approach or a concealment of a planet by the Moon, contemporary to the date written in the document (1058). This scenario is corroborated by two perfectly dated contemporary documents which describe a conjunction and a planetary concealment by the Moon in relatively similar terms. These two documents, unearthed by Robert Russell Newton, are taken from the Annales Cavenses, Latin chronicles from la Trinità della Cava (Province of Salerno). They mention "a bright star that entered into the circle of the (new) moon" for both 17 February 1086 ([Martii incipiente nocte] stella clarissima in circulum lunae primae ingressa est) and for 6 August 1096 (stella clarissima venit in circulum lunae). The first event can be verified as Venus being eclipsed by the Moon, the second as the Moon passing Jupiter at a distance of less than one degree after a lunar eclipse which was also mentioned in the chronicle.

==== Hayton of Corycus ====
The Cronaca Rampona account is apparently also reflected in the Armenian chronicle of Hayton of Corycus (written before 1307). The relevant passage translated from the Armenian manuscript reads:

AD 1048. There was the 5th year, 2nd month, 6th day of Pope Leo in Rome. Robert Kijart (Robert Guiscard) arrived in Rome and sieged the Tiburtina town. There was starvation over the whole world. That year a bright star appeared within the circle of the Moon, the Moon was new, on 14 May, in the first part of the night.

Vahe Gurzadyan's proposal connecting the Hayton of Corycus's chronicle with Cronaca Rampona and SN 1054 dates to 2012.

==== Other ====
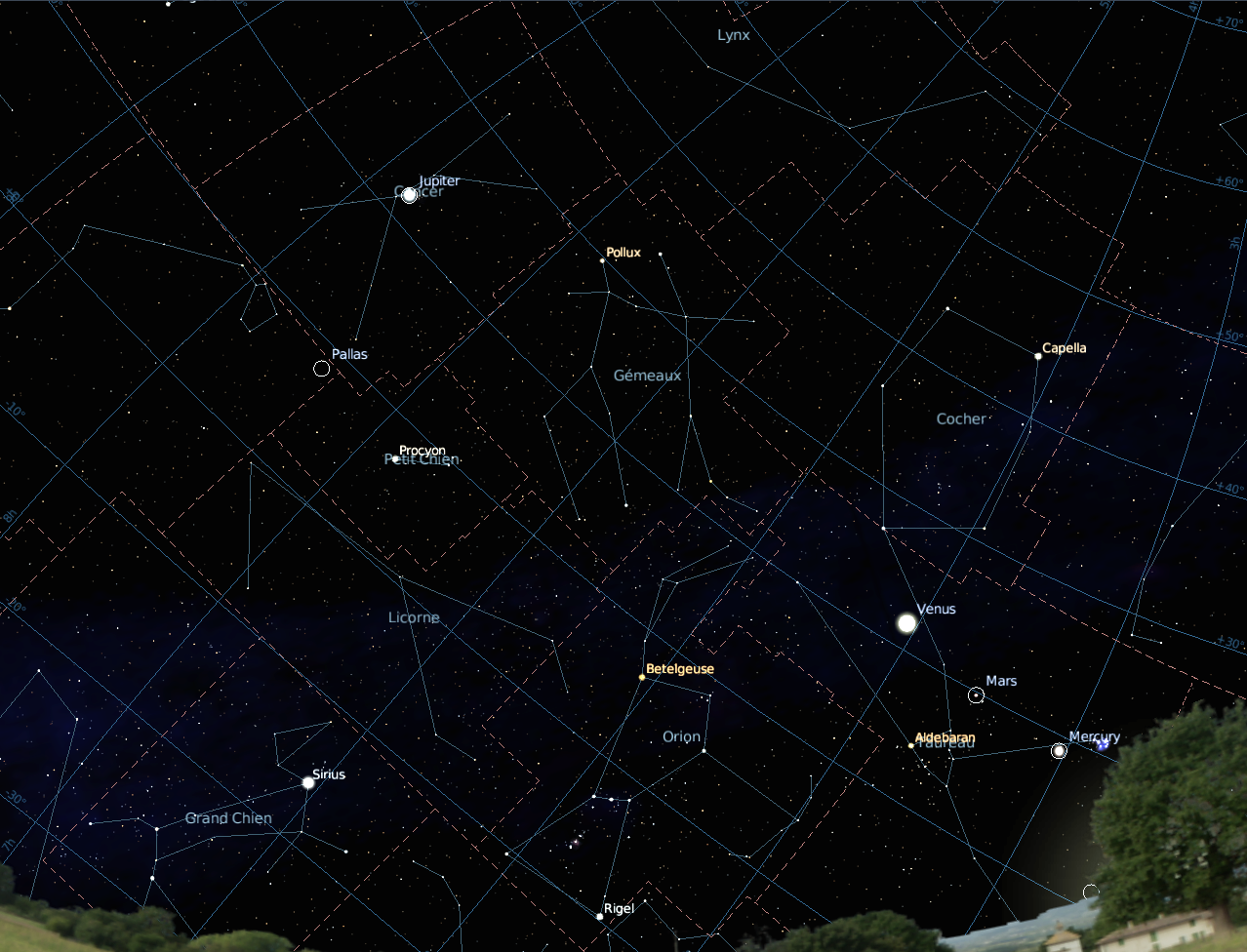
The sky at dusk the day Pope Leo IX died. Mercury, Mars, and Venus are seen together on the west-southwest horizon (bottom-right of image), with Jupiter further away (top right), all next to the constellation of Orion (centre-bottom) and its bright peripheral stars (notably Sirius, bottom-left, and Capella, top right).

In a work entitled De Obitu Leonis ("On the Death of [Pope] Leo") by one subdeacon Libuinus, there is a report of an unusual celestial phenomenon. A certain Albertus, leading a group of pilgrims in the region of Todi, Umbria, reportedly confirmed having seen, on the day that Pope Leo IX died, a phenomenon described as

quasi stratam palliis fulgentibus adornatam at innumeris coruscantem lampadibus.

Translation:

like a road decorated with wonderful adornments and shining with innumerable lamps

Guidoboni et al. (1994) proposed that this may relate to SN 1054, and was endorsed by Collins et al. (1999).

Guidoboni et al. (1994) also proposed a Flemish text as an account of a sighting of the supernova. The text, from Saint Paul's church—no longer extant—in the Flemish town of Oudenburg, describes the death of Pope Leo IX in Spring 1054 (the date described corresponds to 14 April 1054).

On the eighteenth calends of May, on the second day of the week at around midday, the soul [of Pope Leo IX] departed. At the moment it left his body, in Rome, where he rests, but "also everywhere on earth, a circle of extraordinary brightness appeared in the sky for half an hour."

McCarthy and Breen (1997) proposed an entry in several Irish annals as a possible European sighting of the supernova. The entries are variants of the following, in Latin or Middle Irish:

A round tower of fire was seen at Ros Ela on the Sunday of the feast day of Saint George over five hours during the day, and countless black birds passed before it, in the centre of which there was a larger bird [...]

McCarthy and Breen acknowledge problems with interpreting this as a reference the supernova: The Sunday after Saint George's Day in 1054 fell on 24 April, long before the sighting noted by the Chinese; they suggest the date was fabricated for religious reasons. The details about black birds and following are fantastical; they suggest they are later insertions. The astronomical nature of the account remains very uncertain, and interpretation as a solar halo or aurora seems at least as probable.

=== Suggested records in North American petroglyphs ===
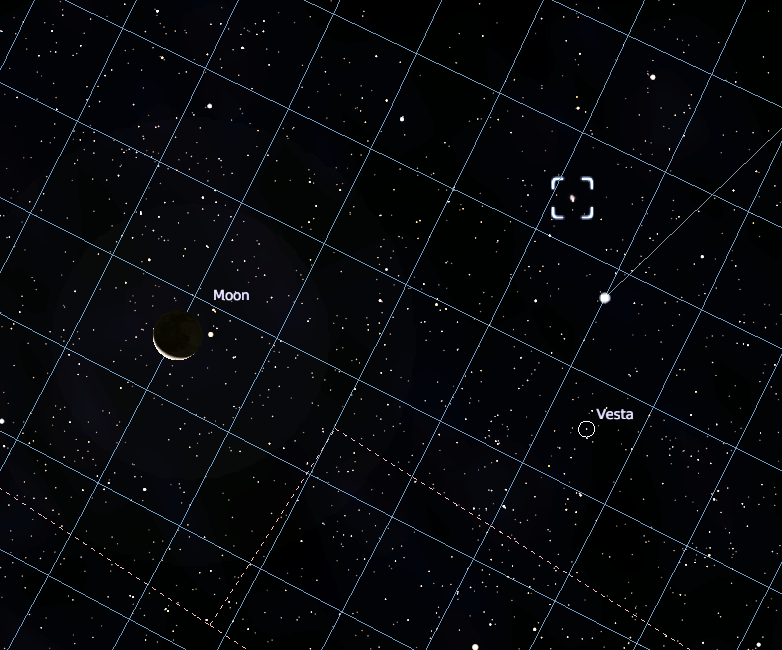
The sky on the morning of 5 July, showing the supernova (in square) and the moon. The orientation does not correspond to the petroglyph but the orientation of the crescent moon relative to the star does, along with the order of size of the angular distance between the two stars.

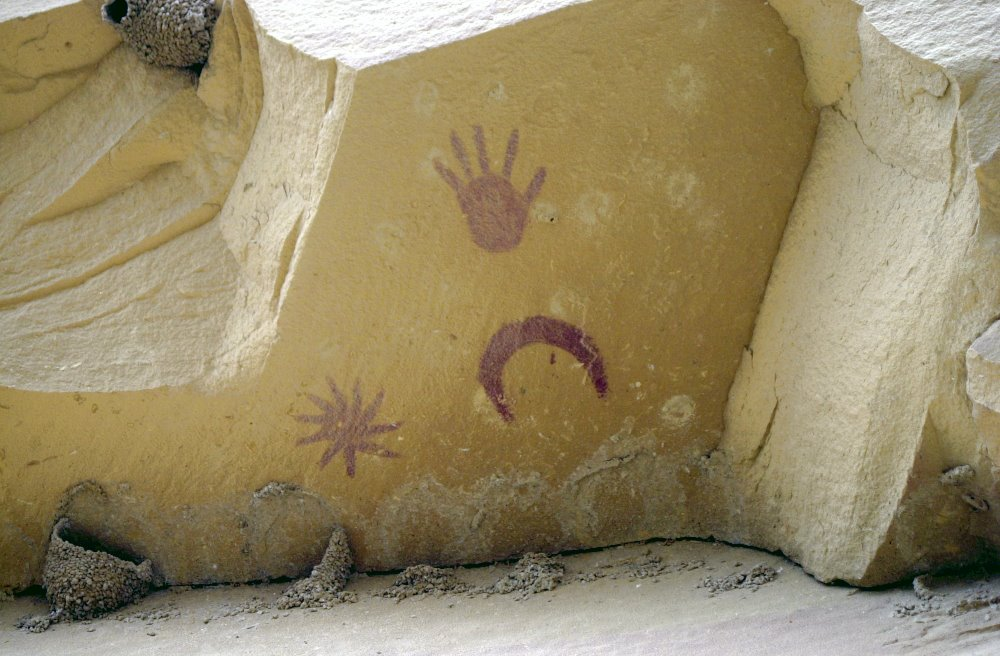
Chaco Canyon petroglyph proposed to represent SN 1054 and the moon

Two Native American paintings in Arizona show a crescent moon located next to a circle that could represent a star. In 1955, optical engineer and amateur archaeologist William C. Miller proposed that this represents a conjunction between the moon and the supernova, made possible by the fact that, seen from the Earth, the supernova occurred in the path of the Ecliptic. On the morning of 5 July, the moon was located in the immediate proximity of the supernova, and this proximity might have been represented in these paintings. This theory is compatible with the uncertain dating of these paintings but cannot be confirmed. The dating of the paintings is extremely imprecise (between the 10th and 12th century), and only one of them shows the crescent moon with the correct orientation in relation to the supernova on the date of the explosion. Moreover, this type of drawing could well represent a proximity of the moon with Venus or Jupiter.

Another, better known document was updated during the 1970s at the Chaco Canyon site (New Mexico), occupied around 1000 AD by the Ancestral Pueblo Peoples. On the flat underside of an overhang, it represents a hand, below which there is a crescent moon facing a star at the bottom-left. On the wall underneath the petroglyph there is a drawing which could be the core and tail of a comet. Apart from the petroglyph, which could represent the configuration of the moon and supernova on the morning of 5 July 1054, this period corresponds to the apogee of the Ancestral Pueblo civilization. It seems possible to propose an interpretation of the other petroglyph, which, if it is more recent than the other one, could possibly correspond to the passing of Halley's Comet in 1066. Although plausible, this interpretation is impossible to confirm and does not explain why it was the supernova of 1054 that was represented, rather than the supernova of 1006, which was brighter and also visible to this civilization.

=== Suggested records in Aboriginal oral tradition ===
The Aboriginal people of the region around Ooldea have passed in oral tradition a detailed account of their mythology of the constellation Orion and the Pleiades. The anthropologist Daisy Bates was the first to attempt to compile records of this story. Work done by her and others has shown that all of the protagonists of the story of Nyeeruna and the Yugarilya correspond to individual stars covering the region around Orion and the Pleiades, with the exception of Baba, the father dingo, which is a major protagonist of the story and of the yearly re-enactments of the myth by the local people:

Again Nyeeruna's magic comes back in great force and brightness, and when Kambugudha sees the strong magic in arm and body, she calls to a father dingo (horn of the Bull) to come and humiliate Nyeeruna and Babba the Dingo rushes over to Nyeeruna and shakes and swings him east and west by his middle and Kambugudha points at him and laughs but her frightened little sisters hide their heads under their little mountain devil neck humps until Babba loosens his hold and returns to his place again.

It has been suggested by Leaman and Hamacher that the location usually assigned to Baba by the locals (recorded by Bates as being at the "horn of the bull") is more likely to correspond to SN 1054 than to a faint star of that region such as β or ζ Tauri. This is motivated by the reference to Babba "returning to his place again" after attacking Nyeeruna which could refer to a transient star, as well as the fact that important characters of the myth are associated with bright stars. However, Leaman and Hamacher clarify there is no solid evidence to support this interpretation, which remains speculative. Hamacher demonstrates the extreme difficulty in identifying supernovae in Indigenous oral traditions.

Other elements of the story which have been found to correspond to astronomical elements by these authors include: awareness by the Aboriginal people of the different colors of the stars, possible awareness of the variability of Betelgeuse, observations of meteors in the Orionid meteor shower and the possibility that the rite associated with the myth is held at a time of astronomical significance, corresponding to the few days in the year when due to the Sun's proximity to Orion, it is unseen throughout the night, but is always in the sky during the daytime.

== Media references ==
The supernova is mentioned in Ayreon's song "To the Quasar", from the album Universal Migrator Part 2: Flight of the Migrator. SN 1054 and the lack of European recordings of the event is also mentioned in the historical novel Space by James A. Michener. The popular science book Death by Black Hole by Neil deGrasse Tyson uses SN 1054 to illustrate the relationships between religion, philosophy and human interpretations of astronomical events. The guest star of 1054 is also mentioned in the novel Red Dragon by Thomas Harris.

== See also ==
- Lists of astronomical objects
- History of supernova observation

== Notes ==
^α Observation dates correspond to the Julian calendar equivalents of the original Chinese dates.
