= SN 1181 =

Supernova in the constellation Cassiopeia

- Image of supernova remnant SN 1181
- Event type: Type Iax supernova
- Date: between August 4 and August 6, 1181
- Constellation: Cassiopeia
- Right ascension: 00^{h} 53^{m} 11.2^{s}
- Declination: +67° 30′ 02.4″
- Epoch: J2000
- Remnant: IRAS 00500+6713 (Pa 30)
- Host: Milky Way
- Notable features: Visible at night for 185 days
- Peak apparent magnitude: 0?
- Preceded by: SN 1054
- Followed by: SN 1572
- Related media on Commons

SN 1181 was a supernova, first observed between August 4 and August 6, 1181, recorded by Chinese and Japanese astronomers in eight separate texts. One of only five supernovae in the Milky Way confidently identified in pre-telescopic records, it appeared in the constellation Cassiopeia and was visible and motionless against the fixed stars for 185 days. F. R. Stephenson first recognized that the 1181 AD "guest star" must be a supernova, because such a bright transient that lasts for 185 days and does not move in the sky can only be a galactic supernova.

== 3C 58 ==
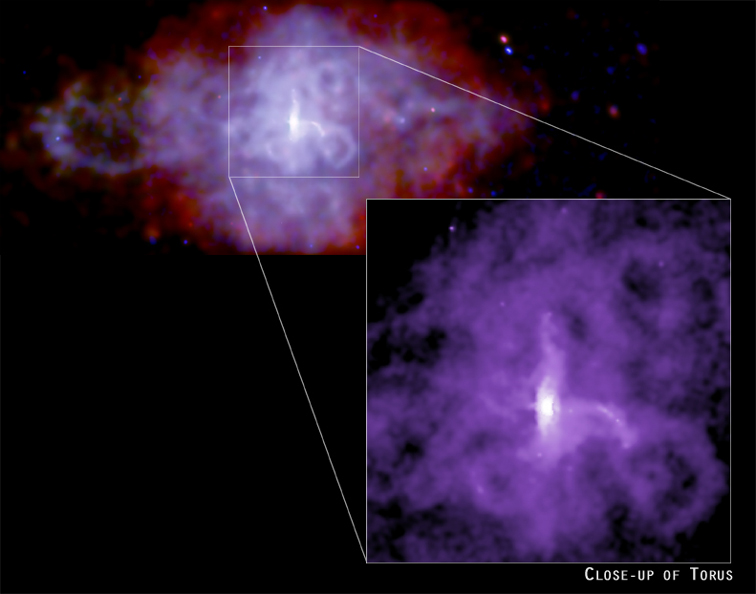
X-ray image of 3C 58 by the Chandra X-Ray Observatory

Before 2013, the only plausible conventional supernova remnant in the old historical area for the supernova was the supernova remnant 3C 58. This remnant has a radio and X-ray pulsar that rotates about 15 times per second. So historically, SN 1181 had been associated with 3C 58 and its pulsar, although many researchers noted that this association is problematic. For example, if the supernova and pulsar are associated, then the star is still rotating about as quickly as it did when it first formed. This is in contrast to the Crab Pulsar, known to be the remnant of the SN 1054 supernova in the year 1054, which has lost two-thirds of its rotational energy in essentially the same span of time.

The age of the 3C 58 remnant has been estimated by many measures. Most directly, the proper motion of the expanding shell of 3C 58 has been measured three times, resulting in a distance-independent estimated age of around 3500 years. The measures of the decline rate of the radio flux have substantial variability and uncertainty, so they are not useful for estimating the remnant's age. Age estimates involving the remnant's energy and the swept-up mass are not useful due to large uncertainties with the distance as well as the presumed energetics and densities. The pulsar is offset from the center of 3C 58, implying an age of ~3700 years, although it is possible to be substantially younger if its transverse velocity happens to be high. The pulsar spin-down age is 5380 years. The neutron star cooling age is >5000 years. With these age estimates, 3C 58 is much too old a remnant to be associated with SN 1181.

The possible sky position of the 1181 supernova has been revised to include additional information on the proximity of the "guest star" to adjacent Chinese constellations, resulting in a greatly smaller error region. This improved region does not contain 3C 58, because the guest star does not have proximity to two constellations as reported. So SN 1181 is not associated with 3C 58. Rather, this new small region contains Pa 30, which is independently known to be a ~800-year-old supernova remnant.

== IRAS 00500+6713 ==
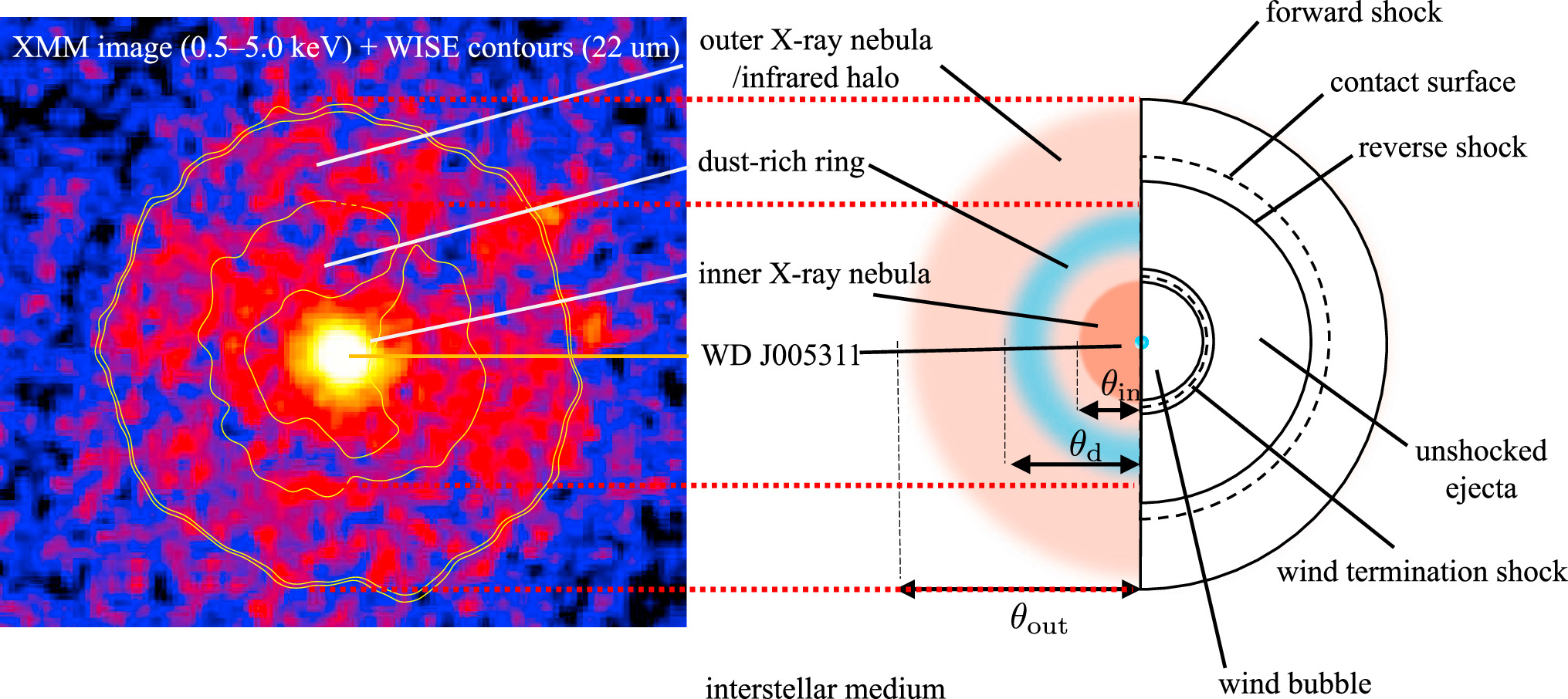
A comparison between an observed image (left panel; X-ray image (XMM) and IR contours (WISE)) and schematic picture of IRAS 00500+671

IRAS 00500+6713 (also known as Pa 30) was discovered in 2013 by American amateur astronomer Dana Patchick while searching for planetary nebulae in WISE infrared data. It was the 30th nebula discovered by his searches, and as a result it is designated Pa 30. Pa 30 appeared as a nearly round nebula roughly 171×156 arc-seconds in size, with an extremely blue central star. The nebula was originally catalogued as IRAS 00500+6713) and its central white dwarf is designated as WD J005311. The shell is bright in the infrared and X-rays, but very faint in the optical, at first visible only by light in the [O III] band.

In 2019, optical spectroscopy of the central star (designated as WS35) revealed a very hot star with an intense stellar wind expanding at a very high velocity of 16,000 km/s and a composition mainly of carbon and oxygen (with no hydrogen or helium). The central star was explained as being a supermassive magnetic white dwarf resulting from the merger of two lower mass white dwarfs while the nebula was attributed to the episode of slow matter outflow during the merger.

Follow-up X-ray spectroscopy was the key to unraveling the nature of Pa 30 as a supernova remnant. X-ray observations by the XMM-Newton telescope showed that the nebula is very hot and contains carbon-burning ashes, neon, magnesium, sulfur, and silicon. It was also discovered that the central object is X-ray luminous and that it has a different chemical composition from the nebula it is immersed within. For the first time it was suggested that Pa 30 is a remnant of a supernova and that the supernova happened about 1000 years ago. The nebula and the central star of Pa 30 were explained as the remnant of a rare class of supernovae known as "sub-luminous Type Iax Supernova" that occurred when a CO white dwarf merged with an ONe white dwarf, producing an unusual central star in the center of a supernova remnant. More recent observations in the [SII] band also revealed fine filamentary structures within the shell that had not previously been seen.

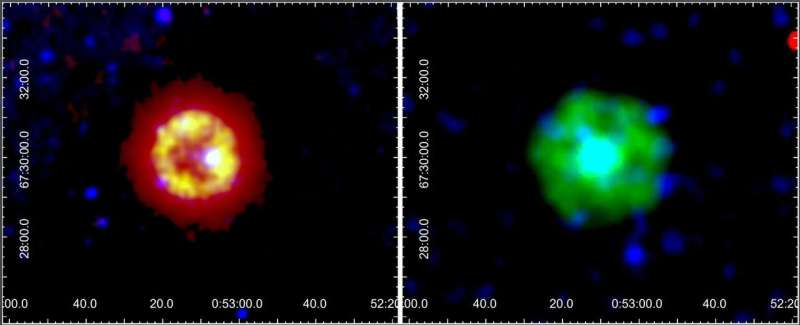
Images of Pa 30 (alternatively IRAS 00500+6713) in mid-infrared and X-ray wavelength ranges. Left panel: IR Wide-field Infrared Survey Explorer (WISE) image. Right panel: X-ray XMM-Newton image. The coordinates are in units of RA (J2000) and Dec (J2000) on the horizontal and vertical scales, respectively.

A 2021 study measured the expansion velocity of ~1,100 km/s for the nebula from optical spectroscopy of the [S II] doublet. This, together with the angular size of Pa 30 and the GAIA distance of 2.3 kpc, confirmed that the age of the nebula is approximately 1,000 years. This made Pa 30 the new prime candidate for the remnant of the SN 1181 event. Furthermore, the expansion velocity of the nebula and the inferred absolute brightness of the 1181 event are consistent with a Type Iax Supernova making, Pa 30 the only SN Iax remnant in our galaxy and the only one which can be studied in detail.

Observations with the Keck Cosmic Web Imager spectrograph were published in 2024. The study showed that the expansion of Pa 30 constrained the explosion date to the year 1152+77
−75, consistent with SN 1181. The observations also revealed that the explosion was likely asymmetric because redshifted filaments are brighter than blueshifted filaments in Pa 30. The observations also confirmed the presence of a cavity at which the filaments end. The filamentary shell has an inner radius of 0.6 parsec and an outer radius of 1.0 parsec. These filaments have velocities that are consistent with them being ballistic.

With a temperature near 200,000 K, WD J005311 is among the hottest stars known. The extreme properties of the central star are being powered by the residual radioactive decay of ^{56}Ni, where the usual half-life of 6.0 days from electron capture is increased to many centuries due to the nickel being completely ionized. But the star is possibly highly unstable, too massive to remain as a white dwarf, and it is predicted to collapse into a neutron star within ten thousand years with a second supernova.

== Gallery ==
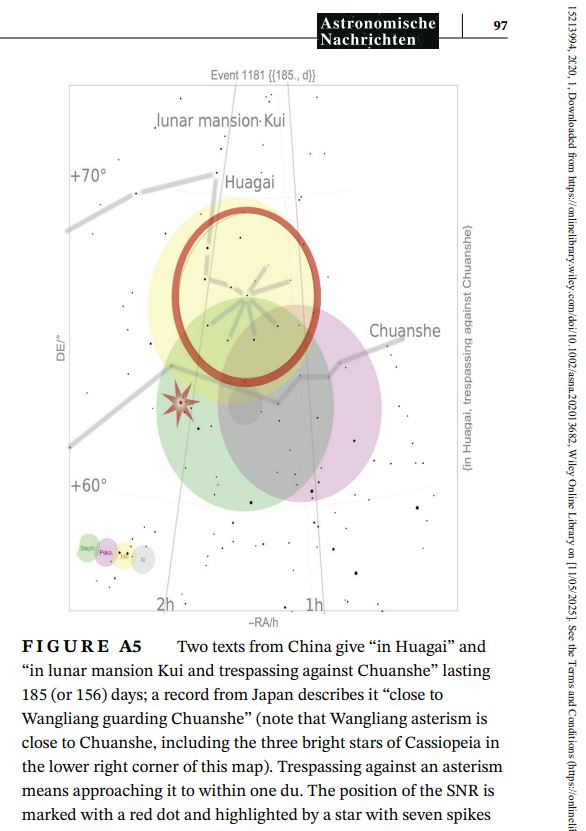
celestial map of Cassiopeia ("W" at the bottom) and the historical suggestions where the SN1181 wasobserved according to Japanese and Chinese chronicles, map published in a research paper in 2020: the star indicates the position of Stephenson's PWN, the red circle the search field for the SNRs

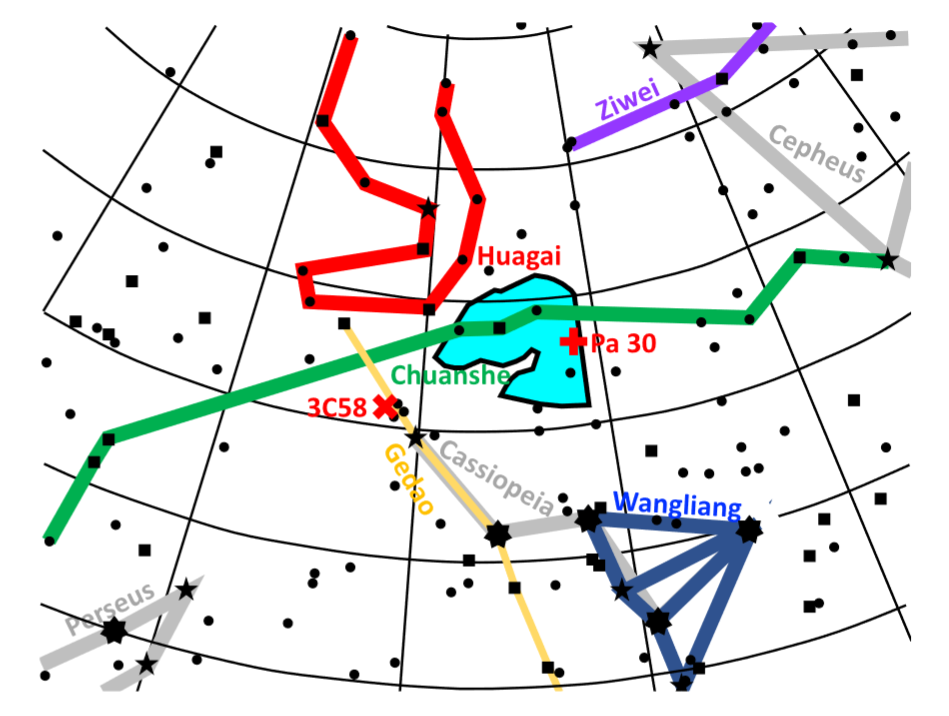
Constrains from ancient Chinese and Japanese observations of SN 1181 (cyan area) and the position of 3C 58 and Pa 30 according to Schaefer 2023

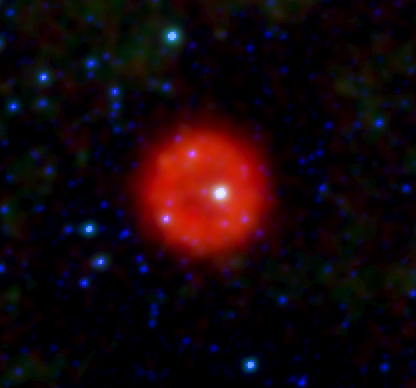
Pa 30 as shown with WISE

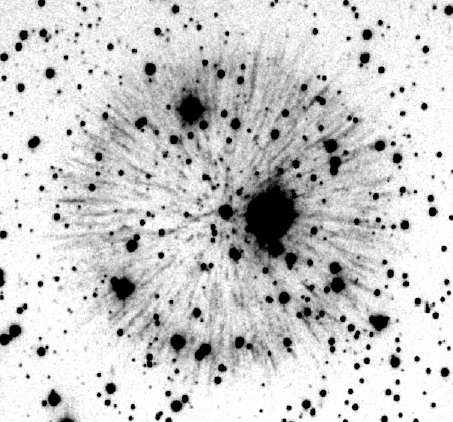
Pa 30 is the supernova remnant of SN 1181. Here the nebula is seen as long thin filaments radiating out from the central star.

As shown by Gemini Observatory north telescope

== See also ==
- Guest star (astronomy)
- List of supernovae
- List of supernova remnants
- SN 1054
