= Herbert Gursky =

- Born: May 27, 1930; Bronx, New York
- Died: December 1, 2006 (aged 76); Falls Church, Virginia
- Education: Princeton University
- Known for: Discovery of Cosmic X-ray Sources
- Scientific career
- Fields: Astrophysics
- Workplaces: Naval Research Laboratory

Herbert Gursky (May 27, 1930, Bronx, New York – December 1, 2006) was the Superintendent of the Naval Research Laboratory's Space Science Division and Chief Scientist of the E.O. Hulburt Center for Space Research.

== Biography ==
Gursky's research activities have concentrated in the area of X-ray astronomy. He has published more than 100 articles in this area and has edited two books on the subject Developments in X-ray Astronomy. He was the Principal Investigator for NASA sponsored space programs on the Astronomical Netherlands Satellite and the 1st High Energy Astrophysics Observatory (HEAO-1) satellite and a co-investigator on numerous other rocket and satellite experiments. In addition, Gursky managed research activities encompassing solar physics and magnetospheric research while at AS&E and programs of ground-based astronomy and infrared astronomy at SAO, where he also oversaw the completion of the Multiple Mirror Telescope, a joint program of SAO and the University of Arizona, comprising a 4.5 meter (equivalent) telescope of novel design that is situated at Mt. Hopkins in Arizona. Gursky's work at the Naval Research Laboratory involved the direction of a basic research unit involving 80 Ph.D. scientists conducting investigations in the areas of space astronomy, solar physics and atmospheric science.

Gursky is best known as a member of the group that made the discovery of cosmic X-ray sources in 1961, his work with sounding rockets (he actually launched the June 12, 1962 rocket) that culminated in the optical identification of the bright X-ray source Scorpio X-1 in 1966, and later Cygnus X-1, his work on clusters of galaxies and the diffuse X-ray background from the Uhuru Satellite, and the discovery of X-ray bursters on the Astronomical Netherlands Satellite.

Gursky died of gastric cancer at the age of 76 on December 1, 2006.

== Education ==
- University of Florida, B.S., Physics (1951)
- Vanderbilt University, M.S., Physics (1953)
- Princeton University, PhD., Physics (1958)

== Positions held ==
- 1957-1958 Instructor, Physics Department, Princeton University
- 1958-1961 Instructor, Physics Department, Columbia University
- 1961-1970 Senior Scientist, American Science & Engineering. Inc.
- 1970-1973 Vice President and Director, Space Research Division, American Science & Engineering. Inc.
- 1970-1973 Associate, Harvard College Observatory
- 1973-1981 Supervisory Astrophysicist. Smithsonian Astrophysical Observatory
- 1973-1975 Lecturer on Astronomy. Harvard University
- 1975-1981 Professor in the Practice of Astronomy, Harvard University
- 1976-1981 Associate Director, Optical and Infrared Astronomy, Center for Astrophysics | Harvard & Smithsonian
- 1981-2006 Superintendent, Space Science Division, Naval Research Laboratory
- 1981-2006 Chief Scientist, E. O. Hulburt Center for Space Research, Naval Research Laboratory
- 2006 Acting Associate Director of Research for the Naval Research Laboratory's (NRL's) Systems Directorate

== Publications ==
- 1975. Neutron Stars, Black Holes and Binary X-Ray Sources. Herbert Gursky (Editor), Remo Ruffini (Editor). D. Reidel Publishing Company. ISBN 90-277-0541-0
- 2001. X-Ray Astronomy. Riccardo Giacconi (Editor), Herbert Gursky (Editor). Springer. ISBN 90-277-0542-9.
- 2001. Exploring the Universe. Herbert Gursky (Editor), Remo Ruffini (Editor), L. Stella (Editor). World Scientific Publishing Company. ISBN 981-02-4423-1

== Awards ==
- NASA Exceptional Scientific Achievement Award
- Naval Research Laboratory Alan Berman Research Publication Award
