= SN 1572 =

Supernova in the constellation Cassiopeia

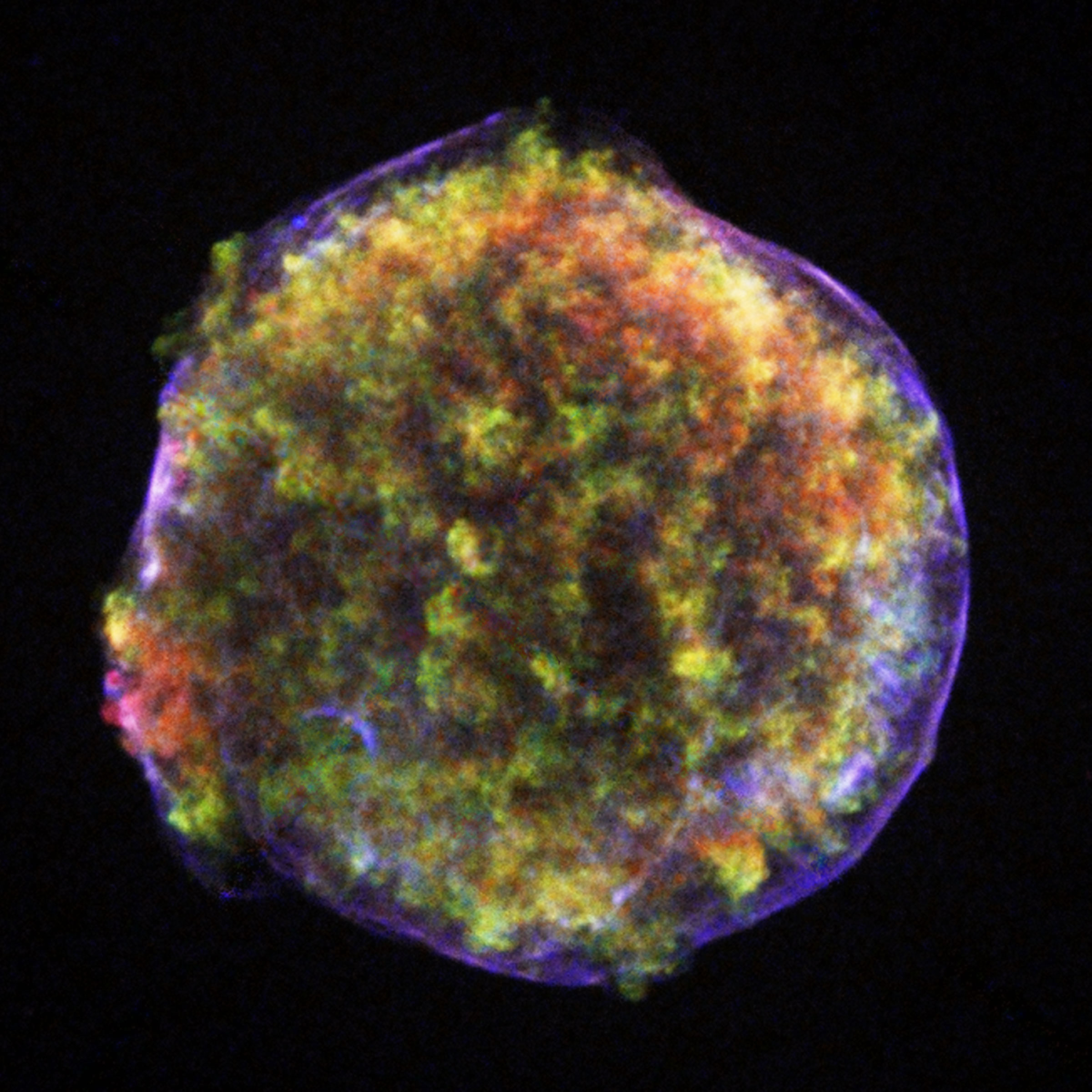
- Remnant of SN 1572 as seen in X-ray light from the Chandra X-ray Observatory
- Event type: Astronomical radio source, astrophysical X-ray source
- Type Ia
- Date: November 1572
- Constellation: Cassiopeia
- Right ascension: 0^{h} 25.3^{m}
- Declination: +64° 09′
- Epoch: ?
- Galactic coordinates: G.120.1+1.4
- Distance: between 8,000 ly (2.5 kpc) and 9,800 ly (3 kpc)
- Remnant: Nebula
- Host: Milky Way
- Progenitor: Unknown
- Progenitor type: White dwarf
- Colour (B-V): ~1
- Peak apparent magnitude: −4
- Other designations: SN 1572, HR 92, SN 1572A, SNR G120.1+01.4, SNR G120.2+01.4, 1ES 0022+63.8, 1RXS J002509.2+640946, B Cas, BD+63 39a, 8C 0022+638, 4C 63.01, 3C 10, 3C 10.0, 2C 34, RRF 1174, 1XRS 00224+638, 2U 0022+63, 3A 0022+638, 3CR 10, 3U 0022+63, 4U 0022+63, AJG 112, ASB 1, BG 0022+63, CTB 4, KR 101, VRO 63.00.01, [DGW65] 3, PBC J0024.9+6407, F3R 3628, WB 0022+6351, CGPSE 107, GB6 B0022+6352
- Preceded by: SN 1181
- Followed by: SN 1604
- Related media on Commons

SN 1572 (also Tycho's Star, Tycho's Nova, or Tycho's Supernova), or B Cassiopeiae (B Cas), was a supernova of Type Ia in the constellation Cassiopeia, one of eight supernovae visible to the naked eye according to historical records. It appeared in early November 1572 and was independently discovered by many individuals.

Its supernova remnant has been observed optically but was first detected at radio wavelengths. It is often known as 3C 10, a radio-source designation, although increasingly as Tycho's supernova remnant.

== Historic description ==
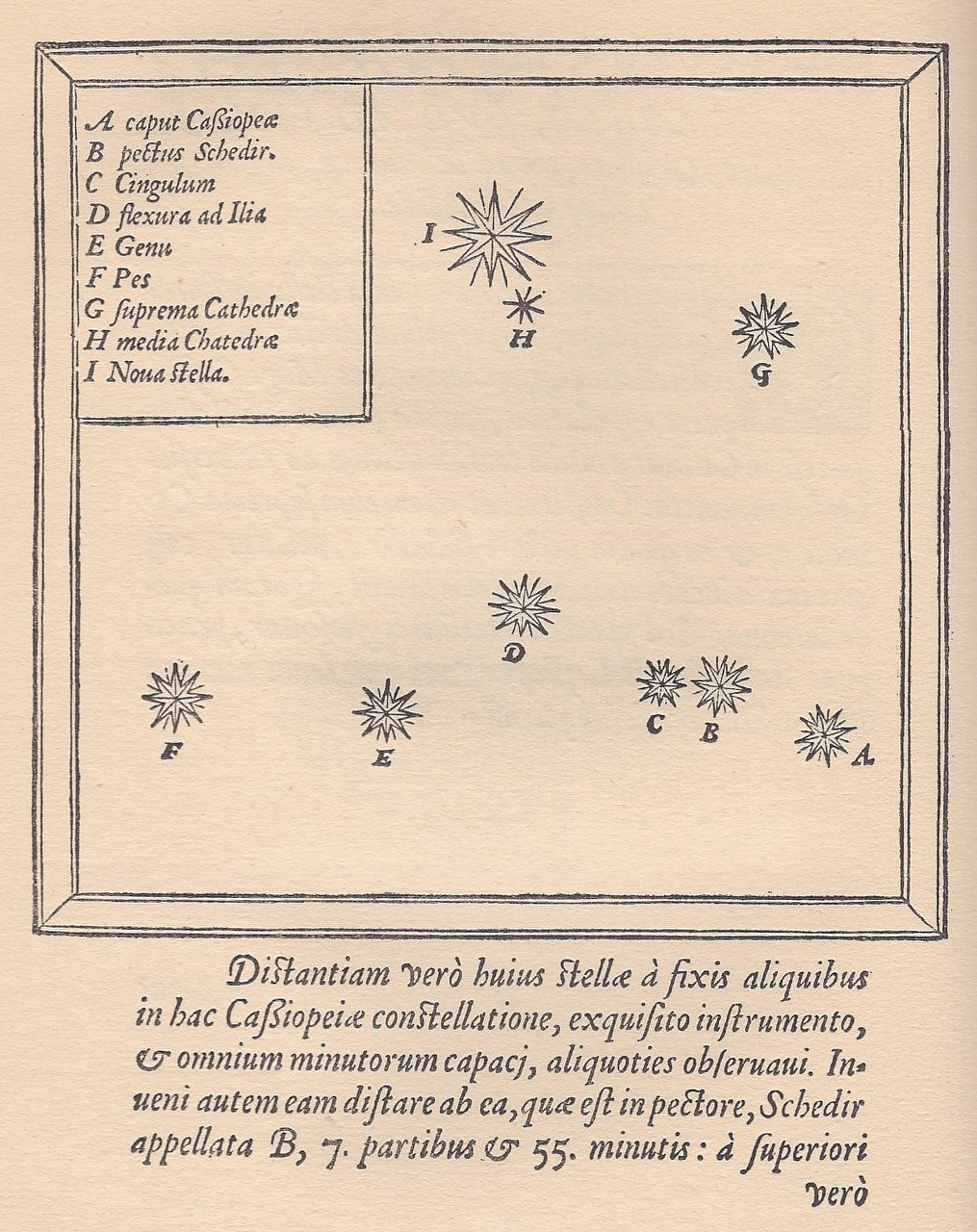
A star map of the constellation Cassiopeia showing the position (labelled I) of the supernova of 1572. From Tycho Brahe's De nova stella

The appearance of the Milky Way supernova of 1572 belongs among the most important observation events in the history of astronomy. The appearance of the "new star" helped to revise ancient models of the heavens and to speed on a revolution in astronomy that began with the realisation of the need to produce better astrometric star catalogues, and thus the need for more precise astronomical observing instruments. It also challenged the Aristotelian dogma of the unchangeability of the realm of stars.

The supernova of 1572 is often called "Tycho's supernova", because of Tycho Brahe's extensive work De nova et nullius aevi memoria prius visa stella ("Concerning the Star, new and never before seen in the life or memory of anyone", published in 1573 with reprints overseen by Johannes Kepler in 1602 and 1610), a work containing both Brahe's own observations and the analysis of sightings from many other observers. Comparisons between Brahe's observations and those of Spanish scientist Jerónimo Muñoz revealed that the object was more distant than the Moon. This led Brahe to approach the Great Comet of 1577 as an astronomical body as well. Other Europeans to sight the supernova included Wolfgang Schuler, Christopher Clavius, Thomas Digges, John Dee, Francesco Maurolico, Tadeáš Hájek and Bartholomäus Reisacher.

In England, Queen Elizabeth had the mathematician and astrologer Thomas Allen come and visit "to have his advice about the new star that appeared in the Swan or Cassiopeia ... to which he gave his judgement very learnedly", as the antiquary John Aubrey recorded in his memoranda a century later.

In Ming dynasty China, the star became an issue between Zhang Juzheng and the young Wanli Emperor: in accordance with the cosmological tradition, the emperor was warned to consider his misbehavior, since the new star was interpreted as an evil omen.

The more reliable contemporary reports state that the new star itself burst forth soon after November 2, 1572 and by November 11 it was already brighter than Jupiter. Around November 16, 1572, it reached its peak brightness at about magnitude −4.0, with some descriptions giving it as equal to Venus when that planet was at its brightest. Contrarily, Brahe described the supernova as "brighter than Venus". The supernova remained visible to the naked eye into early 1574, gradually fading until it disappeared from view.

== Supernova ==
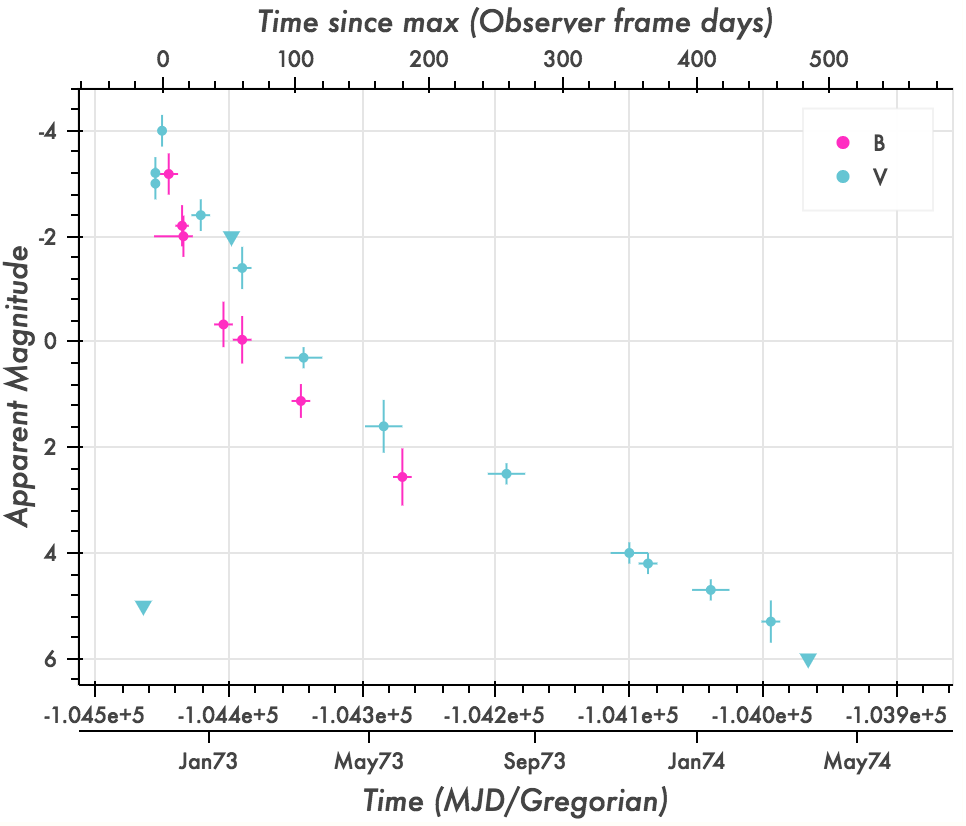
Light curve of Tycho's supernova, reconstructed from historical observations (via the Open Supernova Catalog)

The supernova was classified as Type I on the basis of its historical light curve soon after Type I and Type II supernovae were first defined on the basis of their spectra. The X-ray spectrum of the remnant showed that it was almost certainly of Type Ia, but its detailed classification within the Type Ia class continued to be debated until the spectrum of its light at peak luminosity was measured in a light echo in 2008. This gave final confirmation that it was a normal Type Ia.

The classification as a Type Ia supernova of normal luminosity allows an accurate measure of the distance to SN 1572. The peak absolute magnitude can be calculated from the B-band decline rate to be −19.0±0.3. Given estimates of the peak apparent magnitude and the known extinction of 1.86±0.2 magnitudes, the distance is 3.8+1.5
−0.9 kpc.

== Supernova remnant ==
The distance to the supernova remnant has been estimated to between 2 and 5 kpc (approx. 6,500 and 16,300 light-years), with recent studies suggesting a narrower range of 2.5 and 3 kpc (approximately 8,000 and 9,800 light-years). Tycho's SNR has a roughly spherical morphology and spreads over an angular diameter of about 8 arcminutes. Its physical size corresponds to radius of the order of a few parsecs. The average forward shock speed is between 4,000 and 5,000 km/s, dropping to lower speed when encountering local interstellar clouds. An older source says that the gas shell has reached an apparent diameter of 3.7 arcminutes.

=== Initial radio detection ===
The search for a supernova remnant was futile until 1952, when Robert Hanbury Brown and Cyril Hazard reported a radio detection at 158.5 MHz, obtained at the Jodrell Bank Observatory. This was confirmed, and its position more accurately measured in 1957 by Baldwin and Edge using the Cambridge Radio Telescope working at a wavelength of 1.9 m. The remnant was also identified tentatively in the second Cambridge Catalogue of Radio Sources as object "2C 34", and more firmly as "3C 10" in the third Cambridge list.

There is no dispute that 3C 10 is the remnant of the supernova observed in 1572–1573. Following a 1964 review article by Minkowski, the designation 3C 10 appears to be that most commonly used in the literature when referring to the radio remnant of B Cas, although some authors use the tabulated galactic designation G120.7+2.1 and many authors commonly refer to it as Tycho's supernova remnant. Because the radio remnant was reported before the optical supernova-remnant wisps were discovered, the designation 3C 10 is used by some to signify the remnant at all wavelengths.

Tour of Tycho's Supernova remnant

=== X-ray observation ===
An X-ray source designated Cepheus X-1 (or Cep X-1) was detected by the Uhuru X-ray observatory at 4U 0022+63. Earlier catalog designations are X120+2 and XRS 00224+638. Cepheus X-1 is actually in the constellation Cassiopeia, and it is SN 1572, the Tycho SNR.

=== Optical detection ===
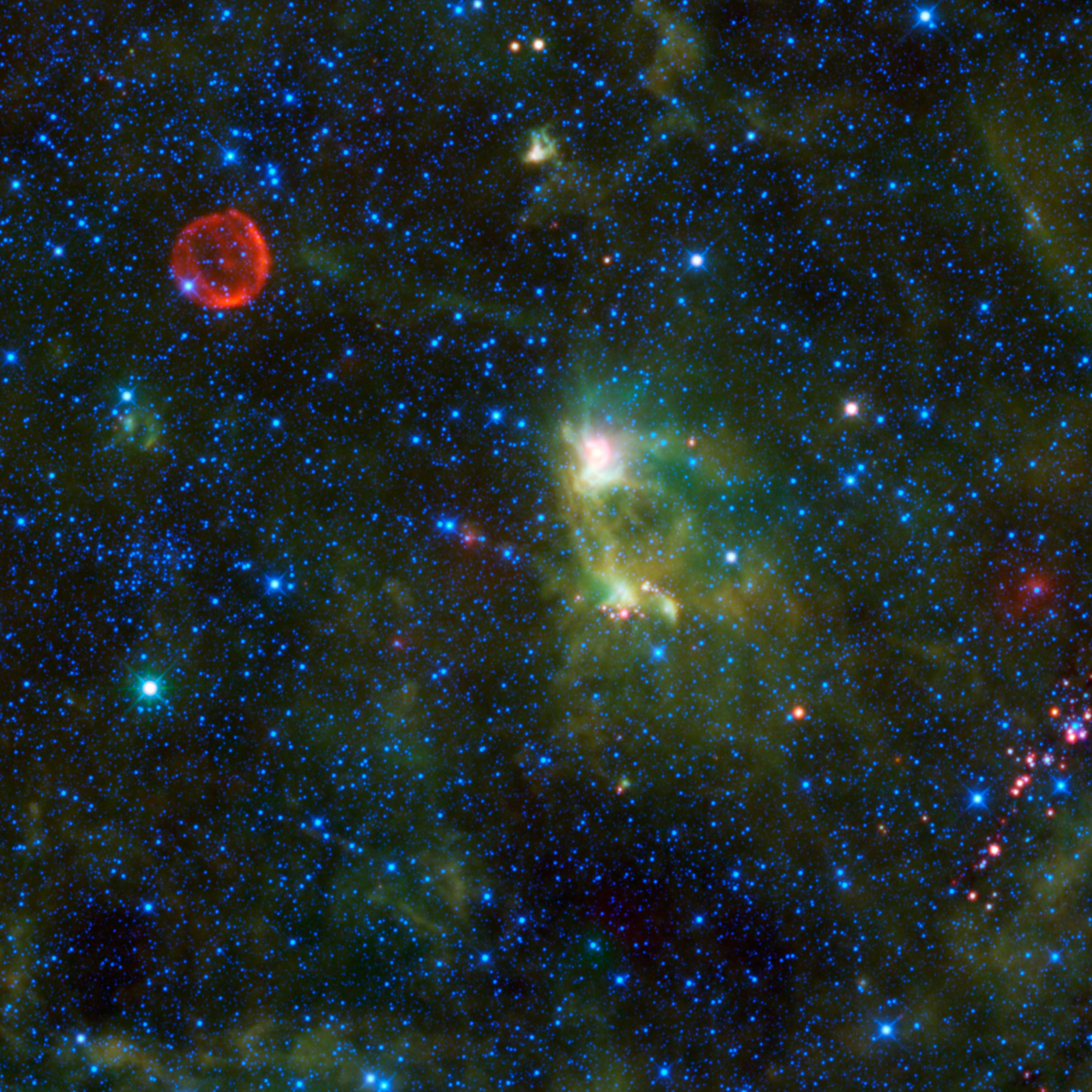
The red circle visible in the upper left part of this WISE infrared image is the remnant of SN 1572.

Expansion of Tycho's Supernova Remnant from 2000 to 2015

The supernova remnant of B Cas was discovered in the 1960s by scientists with a Palomar Mountain telescope as a very faint nebula. It was later photographed by a telescope on the international ROSAT spacecraft. The supernova has been confirmed as Type Ia, in which a white dwarf star has accreted matter from a companion until it approaches the Chandrasekhar limit and explodes. This type of supernova does not typically create the spectacular nebula more typical of Type II supernovas, such as SN 1054 which created the Crab Nebula. A shell of gas is still expanding from its center at about 9,000 km/s. A recent study indicates a rate of expansion below 5,000 km/s.

== Companion star ==
In October 2004, a letter in Nature reported the discovery of a G2 star, similar in type to our own Sun and named Tycho G. It is thought to be the companion star that contributed mass to the white dwarf that ultimately resulted in the supernova. A subsequent study, published in March 2005, revealed further details about this star: Tycho G was probably a main-sequence star or subgiant before the explosion, but some of its mass was stripped away and its outer layers were shock-heated by the supernova.

Tycho G's current velocity is perhaps the strongest evidence that it was the companion star to the white dwarf, as it is traveling at a rate of 136 km/s, which is more than four times faster than the mean velocity of other stars in its stellar neighbourhood. This find has been challenged in recent years. The star is relatively far away from the center and does not show rotation which might be expected of a companion star.

In Gaia DR2, the star was calculated to be 6,400+2,000
−1,200 light-years away, on the lower end of SN 1572's possible range of distances, which in turn lowered the calculated velocity from 136 km/s to only 56 km/s.

== In literature ==
In the ninth episode of James Joyce's Ulysses, Stephen Dedalus associates the appearance of the supernova with the youthful William Shakespeare, and in the November 1998 issue of Sky & Telescope, three researchers from Southwest Texas State University, Don Olson and Russell Doescher of the Physics Department and Marilynn Olson of the English Department, argued that this supernova is described in Shakespeare's Hamlet, specifically by Bernardo in Act I, Scene i.

The supernova inspired the poem "Al Aaraaf" by Edgar Allan Poe.

The protagonist in Arthur C. Clarke's 1955 short story "The Star" casually mentions the supernova. It is a major element in Frederik Pohl's spoof science article, "The Martian Star-Gazers", first published in Galaxy Science Fiction Magazine in 1962.

== See also ==
- List of supernova remnants
