= Corpus Chronicorum Bononiensium =

The Corpus Chronicorum Bononiensium is a collection of Renaissance-era chronicles dealing with the history of Bologna.

The collection includes the closely related Cronaca Rampona and Cronaca Varignana. Cronaca Rampona was formerly misattributed to Ridolfo Ramponi (whence its conventional title). The text of these chronicles mostly consists of the Antichità di Bologna by the Franciscan friar Bartolomeo della Pugliola (c. 1358–1422/5), which consists of annals down to 1420, which in the case of the Cronaca Rampona was extended in similar style down to the year 1535.

The texts of the collection were edited by Albano Sorbelli in 1906 and the years following.
