= Guest star (astronomy) =

Ancient Chinese term for cataclysmic variable stars

- Chinese: 客星
Transcriptions
Standard Mandarin
- Hanyu Pinyin: kèxīng
- IPA: [kʰɤ̂ ɕíŋ]
Wu
- Wugniu: khaq^{7} sin^{1}
- IPA: Shanghainese: [kʰaʔ˧ ɕin˦]
Yue: Cantonese
- Jyutping: haak^{3} sing^{1}
- IPA: [hak̚˧ sɪŋ˥]
Middle Chinese
- Middle Chinese: khaek seng (Baxter)

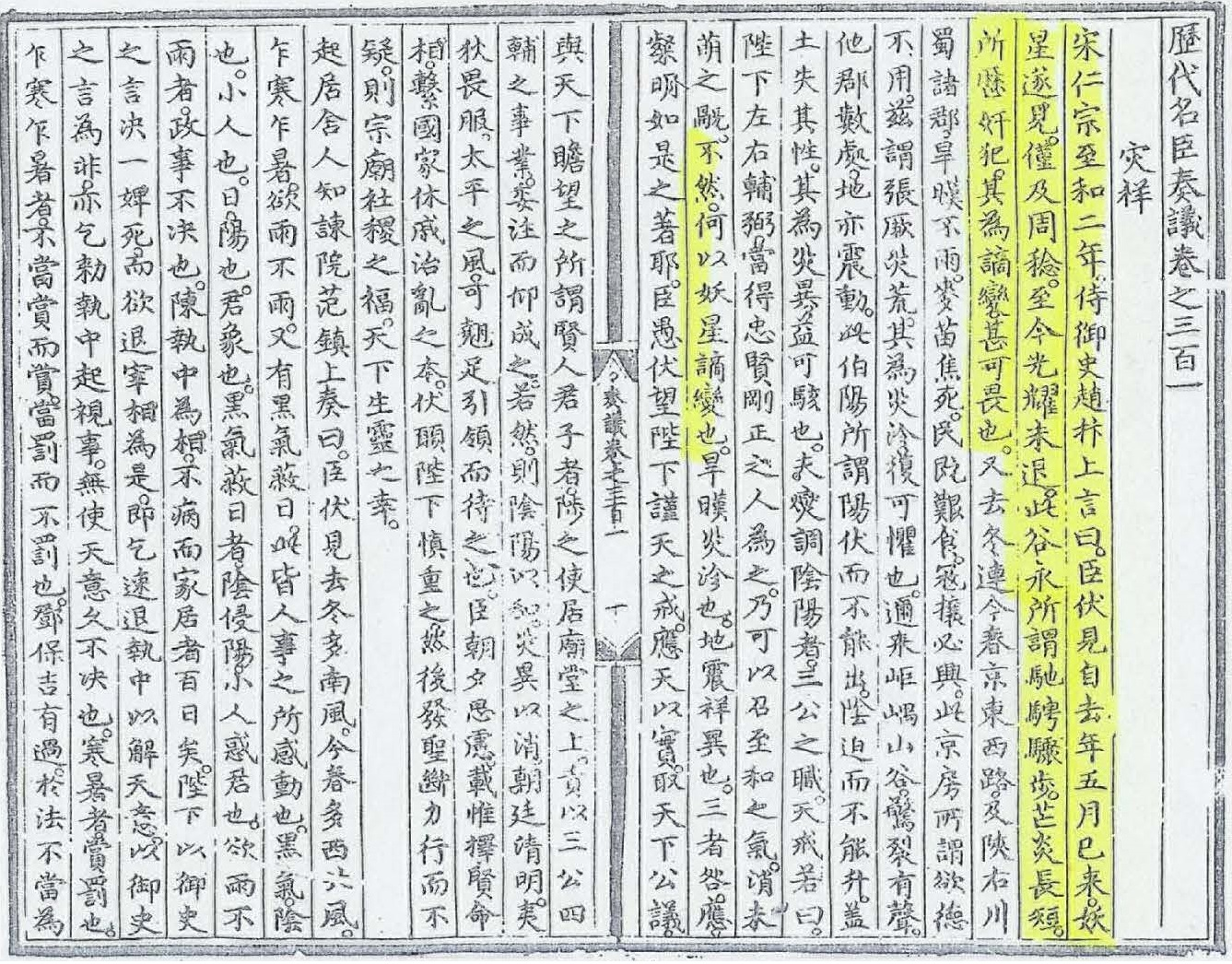
The guest star reported by Chinese astronomers in 1054 and cited in the highlighted passages in this text from 1414 is identified as SN 1054

In Chinese astronomy, a guest star (Chinese: 客星; pinyin: kèxīng) is a star which has suddenly appeared in a place where no star had previously been observed and becomes invisible again after some time. The term is a literal translation from ancient Chinese astronomical records.

Modern astronomy recognizes that guest stars are manifestations of cataclysmic variable stars: novae and supernovae. The term "guest star" is used in the context of ancient records, since the exact classification of an astronomical event in question is based on interpretations of old records, including inference, rather than on direct observations.

In ancient Chinese astronomy, guest stars were one of the three types of highly transient objects (bright heavenly bodies). The other two were comets with tails (Chinese: 彗星; pinyin: huìxīng; lit. 'broom star') and comets without tails (Chinese: 孛星; pinyin: beìxīng; lit. 'fuzzy star'), with the former term being used for all comets in modern astronomy. The earliest Chinese record of guest stars is contained in Han Shu (漢書), the history of Han dynasty (206 BC – AD 220), and all subsequent dynastic histories had such records. These contain one of the clearest early descriptions consistent with a supernova, posited to be left over by object SN 185, thus identified as a supernova remnant of the exact year AD 185. Chronicles of the contemporary Europeans are more vague when consulted for supernovae candidates. Whether this was due to the weather or other reasons, astronomers have questioned why the remnant attributed to Chinese observations of a guest star in AD 1054 (see SN 1054) is missing from the European records.
