= Alicia M. Soderberg =

American astrophysicist (1977–2025)

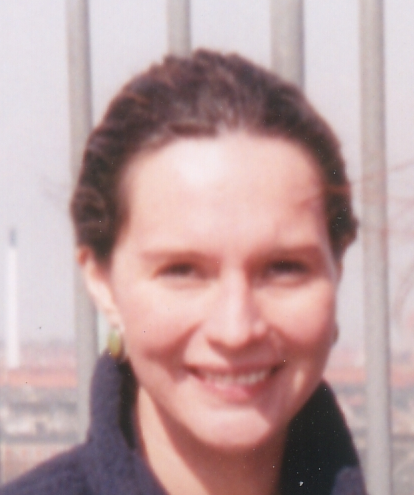
- Soderberg in 2001
- Born: August 18, 1977; Boston, United States
- Died: January 26, 2025 (aged 47)
- Education: PhD, California Institute of Technology
- Alma mater: California Institute of Technology
- Awards: Annie Jump Cannon Award in Astronomy
- Scientific career
- Fields: Astrophysics
- Institutions: Harvard University
- Thesis: The Many Facets of Cosmic Explosions (2007)
- Doctoral advisor: Shrinivas Kulkarni

Alicia Margarita Soderberg (August 18, 1977 – January 26, 2025) was an American astrophysicist whose research focused on supernovae. She was an assistant professor of astronomy at Harvard University and a postdoctoral fellow at the Harvard-Smithsonian Center for Astrophysics.

== Early life ==
Born on August 18, 1977 in Boston, Soderberg was raised in Falmouth, Massachusetts on Cape Cod, and graduated from Falmouth High School. She also spent summers at the nearby Woods Hole Oceanographic Institution studying the effect of water pollution on coastal ponds.

== Education ==
Soderberg attended Bates College, where she graduated with a Bachelor of Science degree in 2000 with a double major in Math and Physics. During her undergraduate years, she also participated in a number of summer programs, including the Center for Astrophysics | Harvard & Smithsonian, the Cerro Tololo Inter-American Observatory in Chile, and the Los Alamos National Laboratory in New Mexico. She then earned a Master of Science from the University of Cambridge in Applied Mathematics. Soderberg was awarded her doctorate in astrophysics from the California Institute of Technology under the guidance of advisor Shrinivas Kulkarni, where her thesis used data gathered from the Palomar Observatory and the Very Large Array to provide a better understanding of gamma ray bursts and stripped core-collapse supernovae.

== Career ==
On February 18, 2006, Soderberg was a member of a group of researchers who detected the gamma-ray burst GRB 060218 located 440 million light years (135 Mpc) away in the constellation Aries. The detection of the associated supernova SN2006aj provided some of the best evidence to date tying gamma-ray bursts and supernovae.

Soderberg and her colleagues detected the supernova SN 2008D as it was occurring on January 9, 2008, using data from NASA's Swift Gamma-Ray Burst Mission X-ray space telescope, from a precursor star in the spiral galaxy NGC 2770, 88 million light years away (27 Mpc). They alerted eight other orbiting and ground-based observatories to record the event. The team was able to catch the supernova in action because they had been making observations of NGC 2770 to observe supernova SN 2007uy.

== Death ==
Soderberg died on January 26, 2025 at the age of 47.

== Awards and honors ==
- In 2009, Soderberg was awarded the Annie Jump Cannon Award in Astronomy
