= HCG 2 =

Hickson compact group in the constellation Pisces

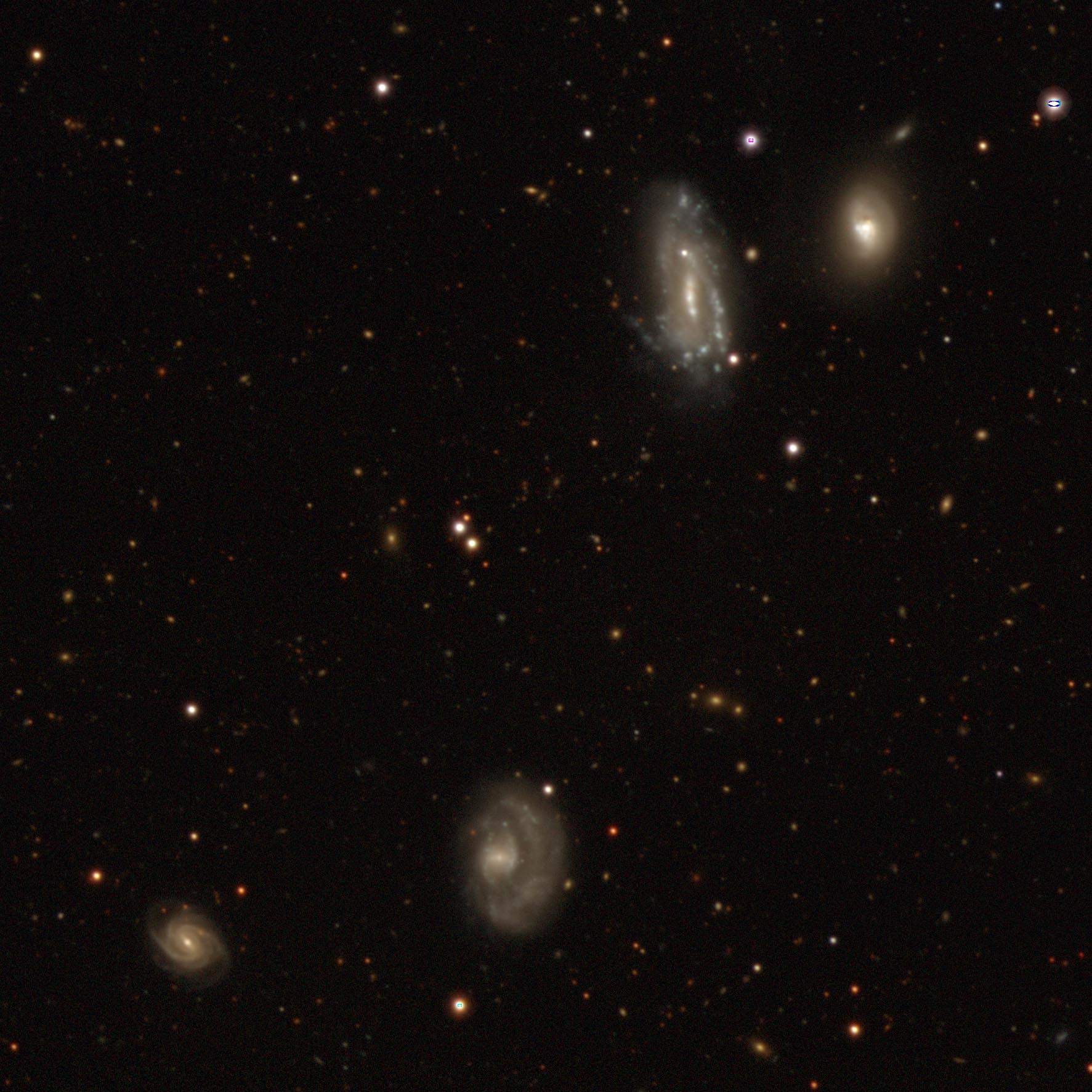
- HCG 2 by Legacy Surveys DR10

Observation data (Epoch J2000)
- Constellation: Pisces
- Right ascension: 00^{h} 31^{m} 30.0^{s}
- Declination: +08° 25′ 52.0″
- Number of galaxies: 4
- Velocity dispersion: 55 km/s
- Redshift: 0.014479
- Distance: 192 Mly (58.9 Mpc)

Other designations
- HCG 002; WBL 012; PPS2 069; HIPASS J0031+08

Hickson Compact Group 2 is one of the compact groups of galaxies n the Hickson Compact Group of galaxies. It is located in Pisces east of HD 2679 and is 192 million light-years away. HCG 2 is one of a hundred such groups identified by a systematic search of the Palomar Observatory Sky Survey red prints in 1982 by Paul Hickson. HCG 2 is classified as a gas-rich group and a triple galaxy merger (triplet), which studies show that UGC 00312 (HCG 2A) has many bright star forming regions, whereas MCG +01-02-018 (Mrk 552 and HCG 2B) is a compact and luminous Irregular galaxy. HCG 2 is located in a dynamically young environment, with a high amount of spiral galaxies, and relatively less elliptical galaxies and lenticular galaxies. HCG 2 is classified as an "early" stage group, pure late-type morphology, and HI-rich group (Type I).

== Properties ==
HCG 2A is the brightest member of this group, which has a blue minus red (B-R) of 0.88, and a corrected total blue magnitude ($B_{TC}$) of 13.35, suggesting that it is a galaxy high in star birth and interstellar gas reservoirs. HCG 2A (PGC 1921) is the brightest, HCG 2D (PGC 1934) is dimmest and furthest galaxy, which has a B-R of 1.54, $B_{TC}$ of 15.74, a distance and a velocity of 1,009.8 Million Light Years, 21340 km/s respectively, revealing it is a galaxy in the deep universe and is likelihood dominated by ageing and cooling stars. Hickson Compact Group 2 has a velocity dispersion of 55 km/s and the crossing time (H_{0}t_{c}) of HCG 2 is 0.087.

A study suggests that the spiral fraction is 100%, indicating all 4 galaxies in this group are spirals. In another study, HCG 2A (PGC 1921), 2B (PGC 1914) and 2C (PGC 1927) have a disturbed morphology, hinting to astronomers that it is gravitationally interacting with other galaxies and possibly merging. For HCG 2A, it has a tail, and is a possible strong Infrared source, while HCG 2B, is a strong Infrared source, indicating a high amount star formation and stellar nurseries. The Far-Infrared Detection has been conducted, and found only three members (A, B, C) has been detected, while HCG 2D has a high redshift and could not be detected. In the Far-infrared survey, it is found that HCG 2B is the strongest FIR source of the three, but a elongated structure can be seen at 60µm, suggesting that they are currently merging. A local active galactic nucleus (AGN) survey revealed that UGC 312 (HCG 2A) host an AGN.

== Neutral Hydrogen (HI) Content ==
A study has found that HCG 2 has a velocity width ($\Delta v_{20}$) of 355 km/s and has a neutral hydrogen (HI) gas content of 15.7 Jy-km/s, indicating it is a dynamically active and gas-rich. It also has a HI gas mass ($M_{HI}$) of 10.08 ± 0.04 M⊙ and there is a relatively low amount of HI gas floating outside of the member galaxies of HCG 2. Another study found that HCG 2A has the highest amount of HI gas masses in the group, indicating HCG 2A is gas-rich. In contrast, HCG 2B has the lowest amount of HI gas, suggesting it is a gas-poor galaxy.

== Star Formation and dust ==
HCG 2A has a star formation rate (SFR) of 2.35 M⊙ yr⁻¹, while HCG 2B has a SFR of 2.83 M⊙ yr⁻¹ and HCG 2C has a SFR of 0.48 M⊙ yr⁻¹. This indicates that HCG 2B is the most actively forming stars in HCG 2 while HCG 2C has the lowest SFR rate, suggesting it is relatively quiescent. All HCG 2A, 2B and 2C are found to be dynamically young, and all of them are late-type and active galaxies. This proves that HCG 2 is has not undergone dynamical processing or virialization. Thus, this represent HCG 2 is a dynamically young and morphology unevolved system. A new research found that HCG 2A, 2B and 2C has a dust temperature of 32.1K, 34.9K and 27.8K respectively. This points out that HCG 2B is a dusty gas-poor star forming galaxy, while HCG 2C has the coldest dust in the group, suggesting that it is a quiescent galaxy. A recent study using the Wide-field Infrared Survey Explorer (WISE) data found that HCG 2B has the highest amount in all four WISE bands (3.4, 4.6, 12, 22 μm), indicating it is undergoing starburst activities.

== Ultraviolet and Infrared Properties ==
Hickson Compact Group 2 seen by Neil Gehrels Swift Observatory

Another analysis has been carried out by Neil Gehrels Swift Observatory's instrument Ultraviolet/Optical Telescope (UVOT), 2 Micron All Sky Survey, GALEX and Multiband Imaging Photometer (MIPS) from Spitzer Space Telescope. It is found that HCG 2A is the brightest in the Ultraviolet (UV) wavelength, while HCG 2B is the brightest in the Infrared band but is faint in the Ultraviolet wavelength. This proves that HCG 2A is undergoing unobscured star formation whereas HCG 2B is undergoing dust-enshrouded starburst and 83% of the starburst is completely hidden by dust. HCG 2B has a steep Infrared Array Camera (IRAC) slope (α=−3.76) confirms a star-formation dominated by Infrared Spectral energy distribution (SED). Using the Sloan Digital Sky Survey (SDSS) g, r, i band, it is found that HCG 2A is the brightest and bluest overall, followed by HCG 2B and 2C. Using color indices, it is found that HCG 2B is the reddest of the three, this is caused by dust reddening, that is proven by the Infrared wavelengths.

== Dynamical state and Environment ==
Another study shows that in the background field of HCG 2, there are 18 foreground stars and 27 foreground galaxies that are in a significant distance away from the group. Observations found that in the region of 1.0 h^{−1} Mpc around HCG 2, there are 3 Elliptical galaxies, 5 Lenticular galaxies and 18 spiral galaxies, HCG 2 has a density contrast of 119, indicating that it is highly isolated from any large-scale structures. This indicates that the amount of spirals in the surrounding environment of HCG 5 is consistent with the amount of spiral galaxies within the group, suggesting that HCG 2 is located in a relatively young environment, with the absence of Elliptical galaxies and Lenticular galaxies which are typically formed from mergers and collisions, which blows away most of the gas and dust which are used to form stars.

== Members ==
HCG 2 consists of four member galaxies. Their names and basic properties are listed below.

Galaxy	Type	Right ascension	Declination	Diameter (Arcsec")	Distance	B_TC	B-R	Redshift	Velocity (km/s)	Minor Axis Diameter(")	Major Axis Diameter(")
UGC 00312	SBd	00h 31m 23.9041s	+08° 28′ 01.287″	102.00	193.3 Mly (59.27 Mpc)	13.35	0.88	0.014570	4326	40.50	19.70
MCG +01-02-018	cl?	00h 31m 18.8591s	+08° 28′ 30.229″	66.00	192.5 Mly (59.02 Mpc)	14.39	1.14	0.014513	4366	21.20	18.40
UGC 00314	SBc	00h 31m 29.3520s	+08° 28′ 02.232″	72.00	188.6 Mly (57.83 Mpc)	14.15	1.10	0.014243	4235	32.90	18.10
UGC 00315	SBb	00h 31m 38.3062s	+08° 28′ 26.423″	60.00	1,009.8 Mly (309.60 Mpc)	15.72	1.54	0.071183	21340	13.20	12.00

== Gallery ==
Hickson Compact Group 2 seen by Digital Sky Survey 2

HCG 2 seen by Galaxy Evolution Explorer (GALEX 6/7)

HCG 2 seen by Pan-STARRS Data Release 1

HCG 2 seen by Sloan Digital Sky Survey Data Release 9

HCG 2 seen by Spitzer Space Telescope

HCG 2 seen by 2 Micron All Sky Survey

HCG 2 seen by Neil Gehrels Swift Observatory

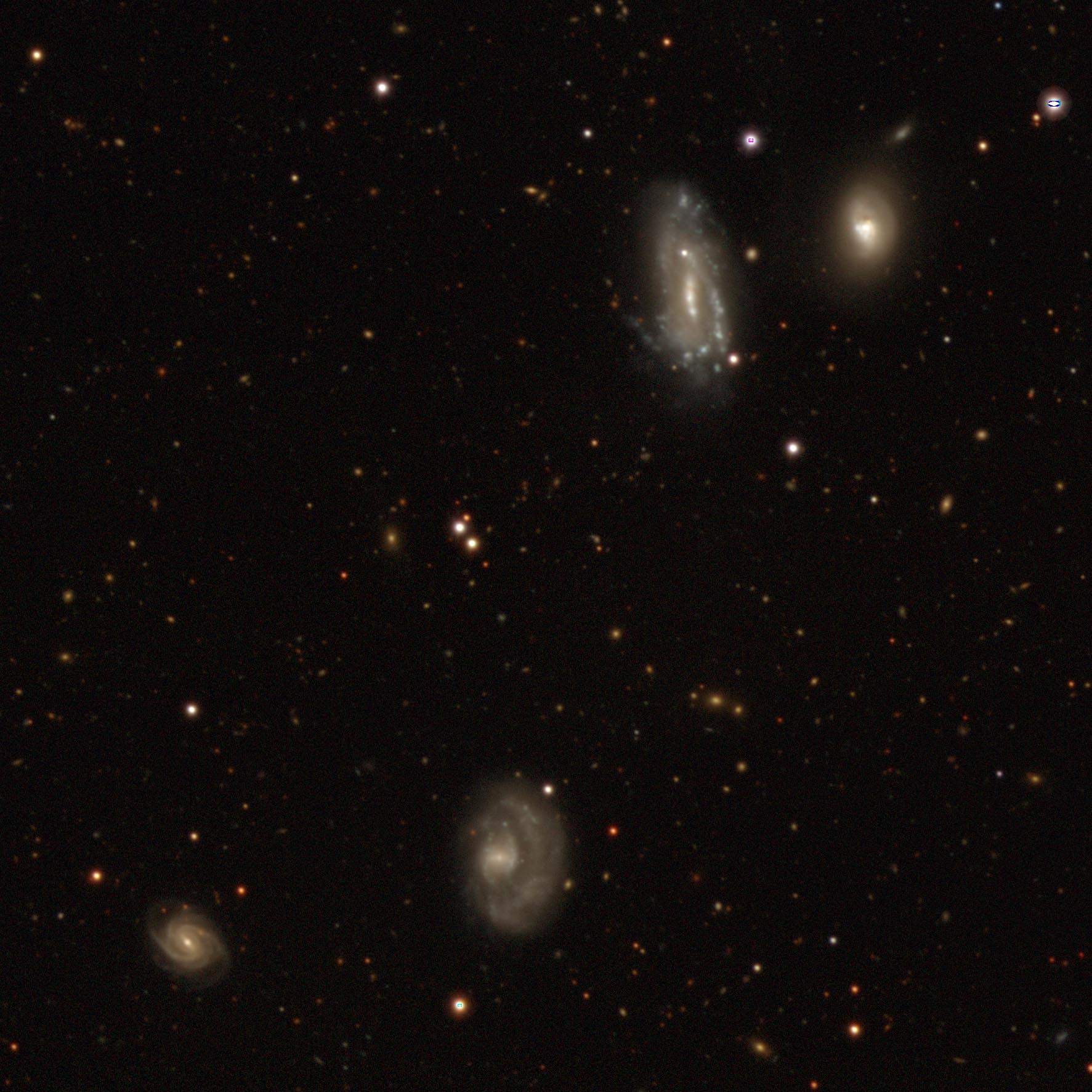
HCG 2 seen by DESI Legacy Surveys
