= NGC 5541 =

Galaxy in the constellation Cancer

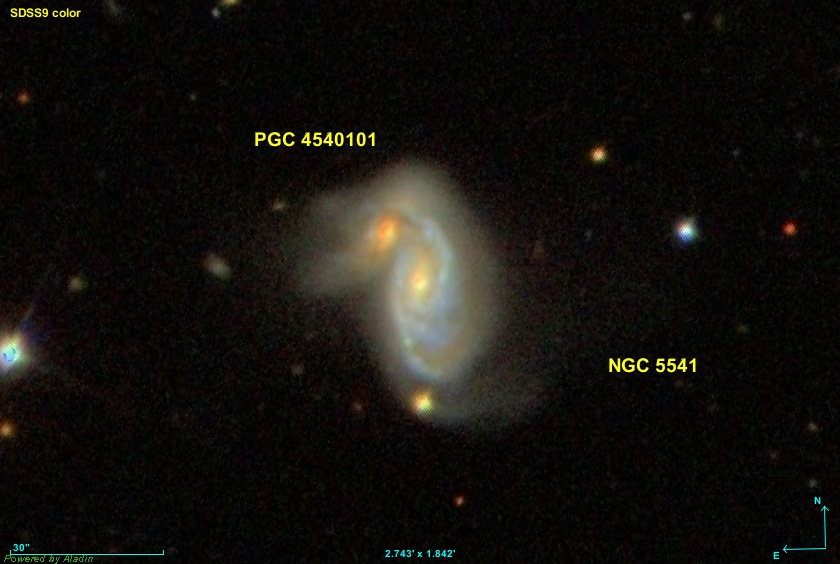
- NGC 5541 with 2MASS J14163236+3935307 imaged by SDSS

Observation data (J2000 epoch)
- Constellation: Boötes
- Right ascension: 14^{h} 16^{m} 31.745^{s}
- Declination: +39° 35′ 21.228″
- Redshift: 0.025612
- Heliocentric radial velocity: 7,678±3 km/s
- Distance: 377.5 ± 26.4 Mly (115.73 ± 8.10 Mpc)
- Apparent magnitude (V): 12.7

Characteristics
- Type: S?
- Size: ~158,000 ly (48.43 kpc) (estimated)
- Apparent size (V): 0.8′ × 0.6′

Other designations
- IRAS 14144+3949, UGC 9139, MCG +07-29-059, PGC 50991, CGCG 219-065

NGC 5541 is a spiral galaxy in the constellation of Boötes. Its velocity with respect to the cosmic microwave background for is 7,846±12 km/s, which corresponds to a Hubble distance of 377.5 ± 26.4 Mly (115.73 ± 8.10 Mpc). It was discovered by German-British astronomer William Herschel on 29 April 1788.

The SIMBAD database lists NGC 5541 as a radio galaxy.

== Interacting Galaxies ==
NGC 5541 is made up of two galaxies in gravitational interaction. The other galaxy to the north is 2MASS J14163236+3935307 (sometimes also listed as PGC 4540101).

== Supernovae ==
Three supernovae have been observed in NGC 5541:

- SN 2006cb (Type Ib, mag. 17.5) was discovered by the Lick Observatory Supernova Search (LOSS) on 19 April 2006.
- SN 2017mf (Type Ia, mag. 16.2) was discovered by the Italian Supernovae Search Project (ISSP) on 21 January 2017.
- SN 2025auk (Type Ia, mag. 18.491) was discovered by ATLAS on 3 February 2025.

== See also ==
- List of NGC objects (5001–6000)
