= NGC 4734 =

Galaxy in the constellation Virgo

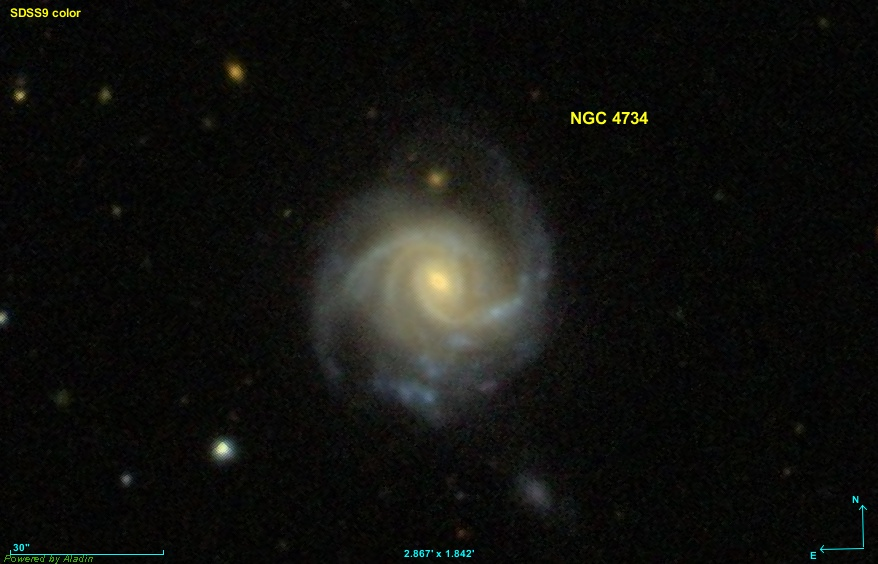
- NGC 4734 imaged by Sloan Digital Sky Survey

Observation data (J2000 epoch)
- Constellation: Virgo
- Right ascension: 12^{h} 51^{m} 12.8847^{s}
- Declination: +04° 51′ 32.244″
- Redshift: 0.025036
- Heliocentric radial velocity: 7506 ± 2 km/s
- Distance: 376.9 ± 26.4 Mly (115.56 ± 8.10 Mpc)
- Apparent magnitude (V): 13.5

Characteristics
- Type: Sc?
- Size: ~135,600 ly (41.56 kpc) (estimated)
- Apparent size (V): 1.0′ × 0.8′

Other designations
- IRAS 12486+0507, 2MASX J12511286+0451320, UGC 7998, MCG +01-33-019, PGC 43525, CGCG 043-045

NGC 4734 is a spiral galaxy in the constellation of Virgo. Its velocity with respect to the cosmic microwave background is 7835 ± 23 km/s, which corresponds to a Hubble distance of 115.56 ± 8.10 Mpc (~377 million light-years). It was discovered by British astronomer John Herschel on 7 April 1828.

The SIMBAD database lists NGC 4734 as a LINER-type active galaxy nucleus, i.e. a galaxy whose nucleus has an emission spectrum characterized by broad lines of weakly ionized atoms.

== Supernova ==
One supernova has been observed in NGC 4734: SN 2024gvc (Type Ic, mag. 19.7178) was discovered by the Zwicky Transient Facility on 17 April 2024.

== See also ==
- List of NGC objects (4001–5000)
