= SN 2007uy =

Supernova discovered in 2007

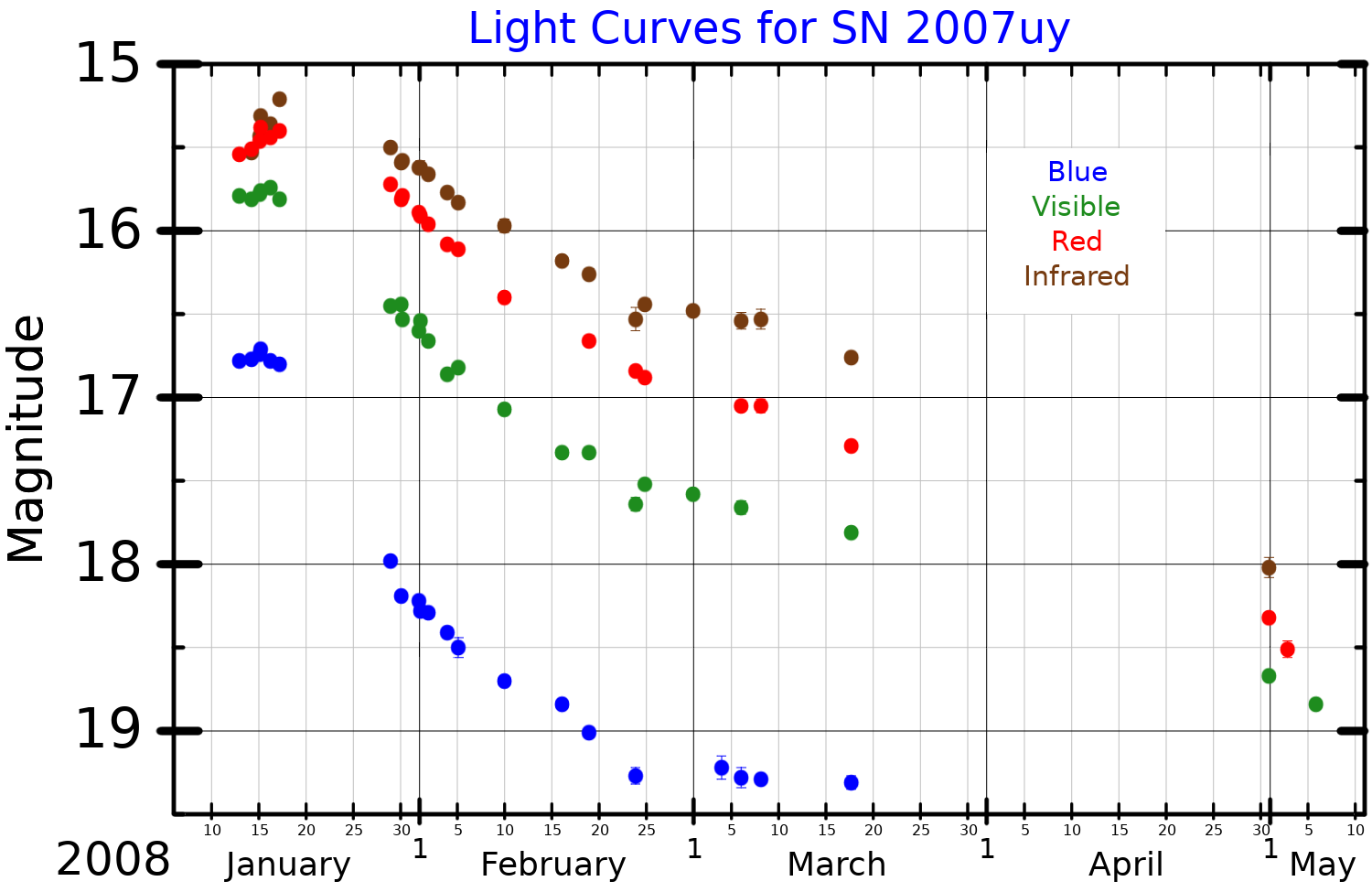
- Light curves for SN 2007uy in four photometric bands, plotted from data published by Roy et al. (2013)
- Event type: Supernova
- Type Ib
- Date: December 31, 2007
- Constellation: Lynx
- Right ascension: 09^{h} 09^{m} 35.28^{s}
- Declination: +33° 07′ 09.2″
- Epoch: J2000
- Galactic coordinates: l = 191.58°, b = +42.2°
- Distance: 96.2 ± 5.9 Mly (29.5 ± 1.8 Mpc)
- Redshift: 0.0065
- Host: NGC 2770
- Peak apparent magnitude: 17.2
- Total energy output: ~1.5×10^{51} erg

SN 2007uy was a supernova that occurred in the spiral galaxy NGC 2770. It was discovered by Yoji Hirose on December 31, 2007 from Chigasaki city in Japan, approximately four days after the explosion. The position of the supernova was offset 20.6″ east and 15.5″ south of the galaxy's nucleus, near a star-forming region. It was identified as a Type Ib supernova from its spectrum a week before reaching maximum, and appeared the most similar to SN 2004gq.

Emissions from SN 2007uy were detected from the X-ray to the radio band. The light from this event was heavily reddened due to intervening dust in the host galaxy. This energetic explosion released ~1.5×10^{51} erg in energy and ejected a mass of 4.4 M_{☉}. The progenitor was likely a massive star that had been stripped of its hydrogen envelope by a binary companion. There is no radio evidence of a relativistic jet of the type that would be associated with a gamma-ray burst.

While interesting in its own right, SN 2007uy was overshadowed by SN 2008D, a supernova whose burst was observed serendipitously while SN 2007uy was being studied by Swift, something unprecedented in astronomy. This second supernova occurred within ten days of the first.
