= SN 2008D =

Supernova

- X-ray (left) and visible light (right) images of SN 2008D (1), and SN 2007uy (2).
- Event type: Supernova
- Ibc
- Discovered: January 9, 2008
- Constellation: Lynx
- Right ascension: 09^{h} 09^{m} 30.55^{s}
- Declination: +33° 08′ 20.81″
- Epoch: J2000
- Galactic coordinates: 191.5472 +42.1883
- Distance: 27 Mpc (88 Mly)
- Host: NGC 2770
- Progenitor: Unknown
- Progenitor type: Unknown
- Colour (B-V): Unknown
- Notable features: First supernova detected by the X-rays released very early on in its formation.
- Other designations: SN 2008D
- Related media on Commons

SWIFT images galaxy NGC 2770 with SN 2007uy before SN 2008D, with X-ray view (left) and visible light (right).

SN 2008D was a supernova detected with NASA's Swift X-ray telescope. The explosion of the supernova precursor star, in the spiral galaxy NGC 2770 (88 million light years away (27 Mpc), was detected on January 9, 2008, by Carnegie-Princeton fellows Alicia Soderberg and Edo Berger, and Albert Kong and Tom Maccarone independently using Swift. They alerted eight other orbiting and ground-based observatories to record the event. This was the first time that astronomers have ever observed a supernova as it occurred.

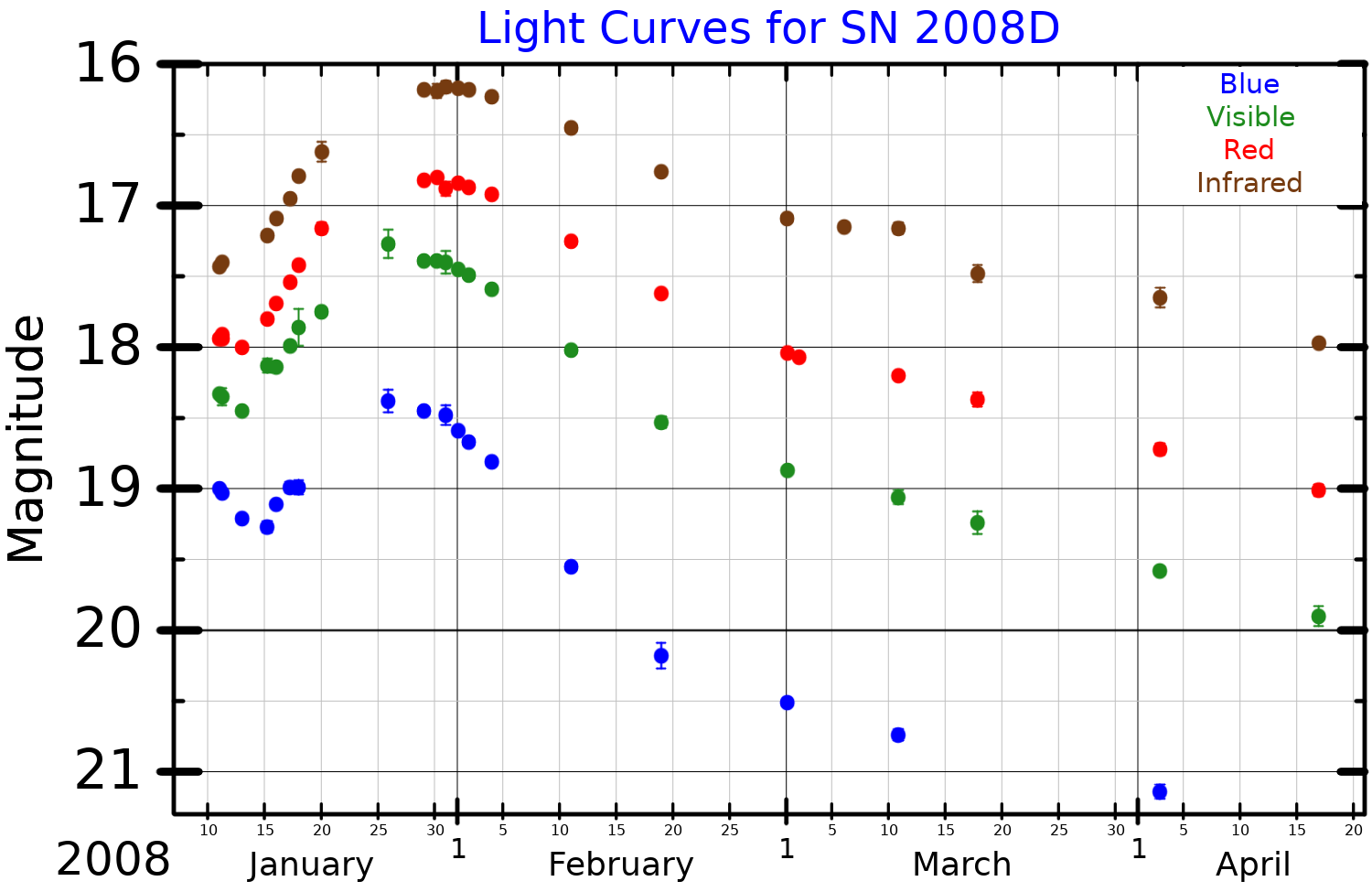
Light curves for SN 2008D in four photometric bands, plotted from data published by Malesani et al. (2009)

The supernova was determined to be of Type Ibc. The velocities measured from SN2008D indicated expansion rates of more than 10,000 kilometers per second. The explosion was off-center, with gas on one side of the explosion moving outward faster than on the other. This was the first time the X-ray emission pattern of a supernova (which only lasted about five minutes) was captured at the moment of its birth. Now that it is known what X-ray pattern to look for, the next generation of X-ray satellites is expected to find hundreds of supernovae every year exactly when they explode, which will allow searches for neutrino and gravitational wave bursts that are predicted to accompany the collapse of stellar cores and the birth of neutron stars.

== See also ==
- List of supernovae
- History of supernova observation
- List of supernova remnants
- List of supernova candidates
