= NGC 2721 =

Galaxy in the constellation Hydra

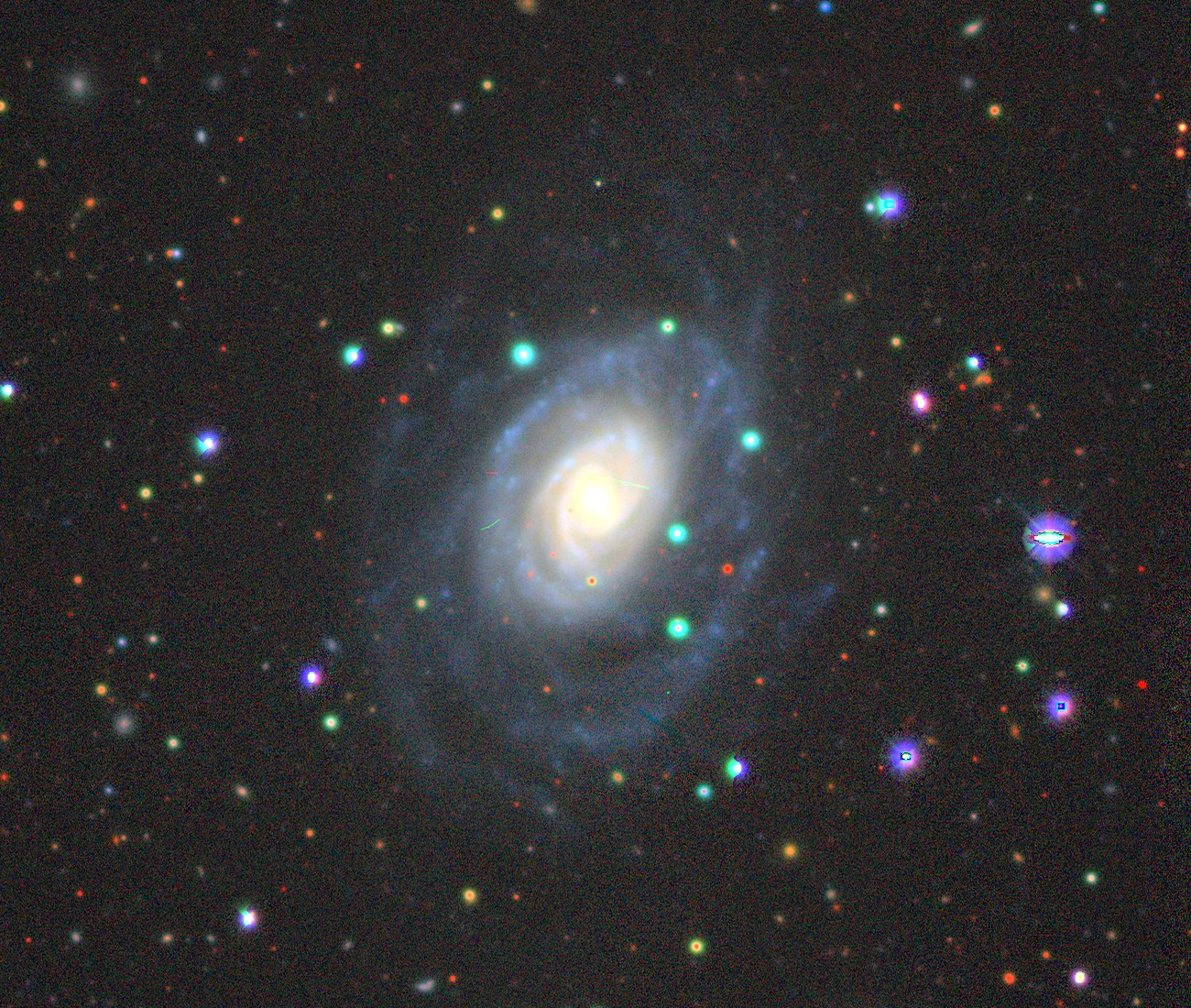
- NGC 2721 imaged by Legacy Surveys

Observation data (J2000 epoch)
- Constellation: Hydra
- Right ascension: 08^{h} 58^{m} 56.5367^{s}
- Declination: −04° 54′ 06.677″
- Redshift: 0.012399±0.00000900
- Heliocentric radial velocity: 3,717±3 km/s
- Distance: 190.90 ± 7.29 Mly (58.531 ± 2.235 Mpc)
- Apparent magnitude (V): 12.5

Characteristics
- Type: SB(rs)bc pec
- Size: ~133,200 ly (40.83 kpc) (estimated)
- Apparent size (V): 2.3′ × 1.6′

Other designations
- IRAS 08564-0442, 2MASX J08585649-0454072, MCG -01-23-015, PGC 25231

NGC 2721 is a barred spiral galaxy in the constellation of Hydra. Its velocity with respect to the cosmic microwave background is 4,028±22 km/s, which corresponds to a Hubble distance of 193.8 ± 13.6 Mly (59.41 ± 4.17 Mpc). Additionally, 13 non-redshift measurements give a similar mean distance of 190.90 ± 7.29 Mly (58.531 ± 2.235 Mpc). It was discovered by German-British astronomer William Herschel on 1 February 1786.

NGC 2721 is a Seyfert II galaxy, i.e. it has a quasar-like nucleus with very high surface brightnesses whose spectra reveal strong, high-ionisation emission lines, but unlike quasars, the host galaxy is clearly detectable.

== Supernova ==
One supernova has been observed in NGC 2721:

- SN 2024xjl (Type Ib/c, mag. 17.605) was discovered by ATLAS on 5 October 2024.

== See also ==
- List of NGC objects (2001–3000)
