= NGC 2642 =

Galaxy in the constellation Hydra

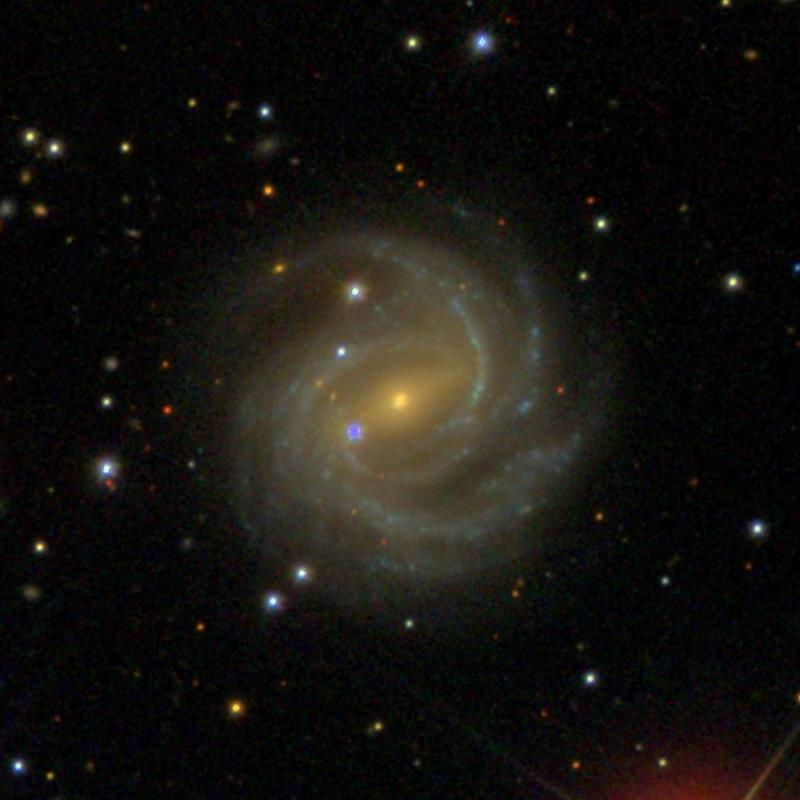
- NGC 2642 imaged by SDSS

Observation data (J2000 epoch)
- Constellation: Hydra
- Right ascension: 08^{h} 40^{m} 44.3818^{s}
- Declination: −04° 07′ 18.011″
- Redshift: 0.014473
- Heliocentric radial velocity: 4339 ± 5 km/s
- Distance: 222.8 ± 15.6 Mly (68.32 ± 4.79 Mpc)
- Apparent magnitude (V): 12.6

Characteristics
- Type: SB(r)bc
- Size: ~140,800 ly (43.17 kpc) (estimated)
- Apparent size (V): 2.0′ × 1.8′

Other designations
- IRAS 08382-0356, 2MASX J08404435-0407182, MCG -01-22-033, PGC 24395

NGC 2642 is a barred spiral galaxy in the constellation of Hydra. Its velocity with respect to the cosmic microwave background is 4632 ± 21 km/s, which corresponds to a Hubble distance of 68.32 ± 4.79 Mpc (~223 million light-years). It was discovered by British astronomer John Herschel on 19 February 1830.

According to the SIMBAD database, NGC 2642 is a Seyfert I galaxy, i.e. it has a quasar-like nuclei with very high surface brightnesses whose spectra reveal strong, high-ionisation emission lines, but unlike quasars, the host galaxy is clearly detectable.

== Supernovae ==
Three supernovae have been observed in NGC 2642:

- SN 2002fj (Type IIn, mag. 15.8) was discovered by Berto Monard on 12 September 2002.
- SN 2008bh (Type II, mag. 16.3) was discovered by the Lick Observatory Supernova Search (LOSS) and by The CHilean Automatic Supernova sEarch (CHASE) on 23 March 2008.
- SN 2023aaby (Type Ic, mag. 17.943) was discovered by ATLAS on 14 December 2023.

== See also ==
- List of NGC objects (2001–3000)
