= GRB 111209A =

Long-lasting gamma-ray burst

- Event type: Gamma-ray burst, supernova
- SNSLSN
- Duration: at least 7 hours
- Constellation: Phoenix
- Right ascension: 00^{h} 57^{m} 22.63^{s}
- Declination: −46° 48′ 03.8″
- Other designations: GRB 111209A, SN 2011kl
- Related media on Commons

GRB 111209A is the second longest lasting gamma-ray burst (GRB) detected by the Swift Gamma-Ray Burst Mission, observed on December 9, 2011. Its duration is longer than 7 hours, implying this event has a different kind of progenitor than normal long GRBs. It was first proposed that the progenitor of this event was a blue supergiant star with low metallicity. Later, it was also proposed that this event is the prototype of a new class of GRBs, ultra-long GRBs.

The GRB was associated with the magnetar-powered supernova SN 2011kl, an object of intermediate luminosity between conventional GRB supernovae and superluminous supernovae.

== See also ==
- List of gamma-ray bursts
- Supermassive black hole
- Tidal force
- GRB 250702B, the longest-duration GRB ever detected

Preceded by GRB 060218	Longest gamma-ray burst 2011 – 2025	Succeeded by GRB 250702B
