= SWIFT J1745−26 =

Stellar-mass black hole in the constellation Sagittarius

- Short narrated video about SWIFT J1745-26

Observation data Epoch J2000 Equinox ICRS
- Constellation: Sagittarius
- Right ascension: 17^{h} 45^{m} 10.849^{s}
- Declination: −26° 24′ 12.60″

Database references
SIMBAD	data

SWIFT J1745−26 is a stellar-mass black hole located a few degrees from the center of the Milky Way galaxy toward the constellation Sagittarius. It was discovered by NASA's Swift satellite on September 16, 2012, due to the detection of an X-ray nova. The pattern of X-rays from the nova indicated that the central object was a black hole. Its name arises from the coordinates of its sky position. While astronomers do not know its precise distance, they think the object resides about 20,000 to 30,000 light-years away in the galaxy's inner region. Ground-based observatories have detected infrared and radio emissions from SWIFT J1745−26, but thick clouds of obscuring dust have prevented astronomers from catching SWIFT J1745−26 in visible light.

SWIFT J1745−26 must be a member of a low-mass X-ray binary (LMXB) system, which includes a normal, sun-like star.
