= GRB 060218 =

February 18, 2006 gamma-ray burst in the constellation Aries

GRB 060218/SN 2006aj
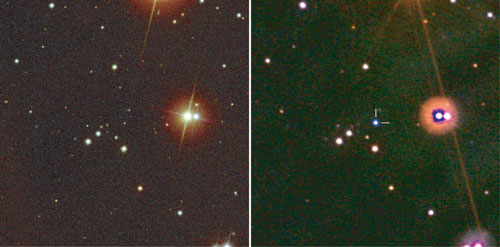
- Ic
- Date: February 18, 2006
- Constellation: Aries
- Right ascension: 03^{h} 21^{m} 39.71^{s}
- Declination: +16° 52′ 02.6″
- Epoch: J2000
- Galactic coordinates: 166.9257 -32.8802
- Distance: 440 million ly
- Redshift: 0.03342
- Remnant: Unknown
- Host: SDSS J032139.68+165201.7
- Progenitor: Unknown
- Progenitor type: Unknown
- Colour (B-V): Unknown
- Notable features: Rare GRB+SN sequence
- Peak apparent magnitude: ca 17.8 (February 23)
- Other designations: SN 2006aj, GRB 060218, GRB 060218A
- Related media on Commons

GRB 060218 (and SN 2006aj) was a gamma-ray burst (abbreviated as GRB) with unusual characteristics never seen before. This GRB was detected by the Swift satellite on February 18, 2006, and its name is derived from the date. It was located in the constellation Aries.

GRB 060218's duration (almost 2,000 seconds) and its origin in a galaxy 440 million light-years away are far longer and closer, respectively, than typical gamma-ray bursts seen before, and the burst was also considerably dimmer than average despite its close distance.

As of February 2006, the phenomenon was not yet well understood. However, an optical afterglow to the gamma-ray burst was detected and brightened, and some scientists believed that the appearance of a supernova (SN 2006aj) may have been ongoing.

Four different groups of researchers, led by Sergio Campana, Elena Pian, Alicia Soderberg and Paolo Mazzali, respectively, carried out the investigation of the phenomenon and presented their results in Nature on August 31, 2006. They found the strongest evidence yet that supernovae and GRBs might be linked, because GRB 060218 showed signs of both the GRB and the supernova. The exploding star is believed to have had the boundary mass (about 20 Solar masses) for supernovae to leave either a black hole or a neutron star after its explosion.

Preceded by	Longest gamma-ray burst 2006 – 2011	Succeeded by GRB 111209A
