= GRB 060614 =

June 2006 Gamma-ray burst in the constellation Indus

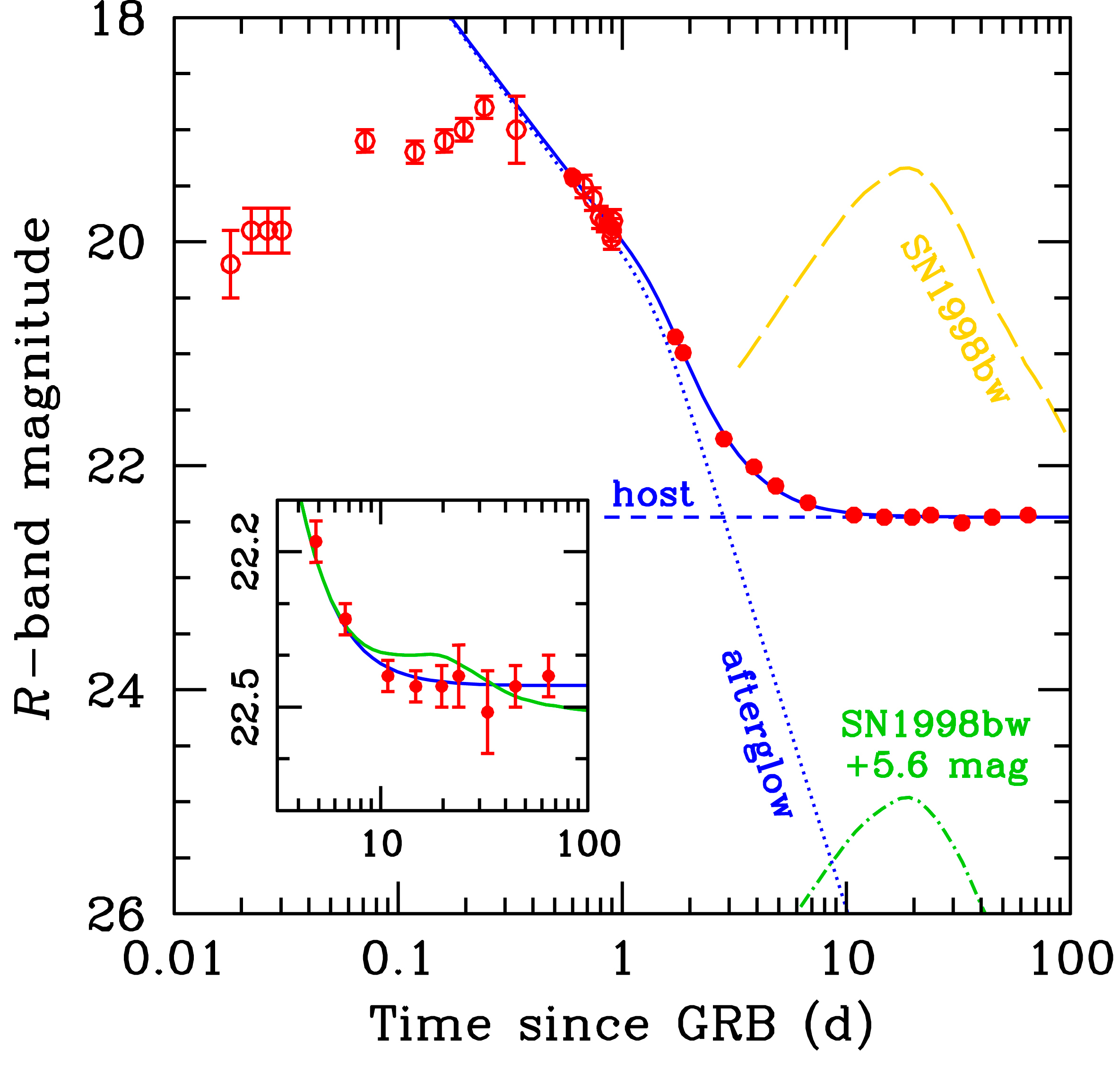
- Event type: Gamma-ray burst
- Constellation: Indus
- Right ascension: 21^{h} 23^{m} 27.0^{s}
- Declination: −53° 02′ 02″
- Distance: 1,600,000,000 ly (490,000,000 pc)
- Source: [PBF2006d] Host Galaxy
- Other designations: GRB 060614
- Related media on Commons

GRB 060614 was a gamma-ray burst detected by the Neil Gehrels Swift Observatory on June 14, 2006, with peculiar properties. It challenged a previously held scientific consensus on gamma-ray burst progenitors and black holes.

Prior to this detection, it was believed that a long gamma-ray burst, like GRB 060614, was probably caused by gravitational collapse of a large star into a black hole, and would be accompanied by detectable supernova, whilst short gamma-ray bursts were thought to be the merger of two neutron stars. However, the lack of any supernova and the vanishing spectral lags during GRB 060614 are typical of short GRBs, at odds with the long (102s) duration of this event and its origin in a galaxy 1.6 billion light years away in the constellation Indus.

In December 2006, an article on the burst was published in the journal Nature, with the editors describing a hunt by scientists to define a new GRB classification system to account for this burst. GRB 060614 was subsequently classified as a "hybrid gamma-ray burst", defined as a long burst without accompanying supernova.
