= GRB 250702BDE =

Long-lasting extragalactic gamma-ray burst

GRB 250702B
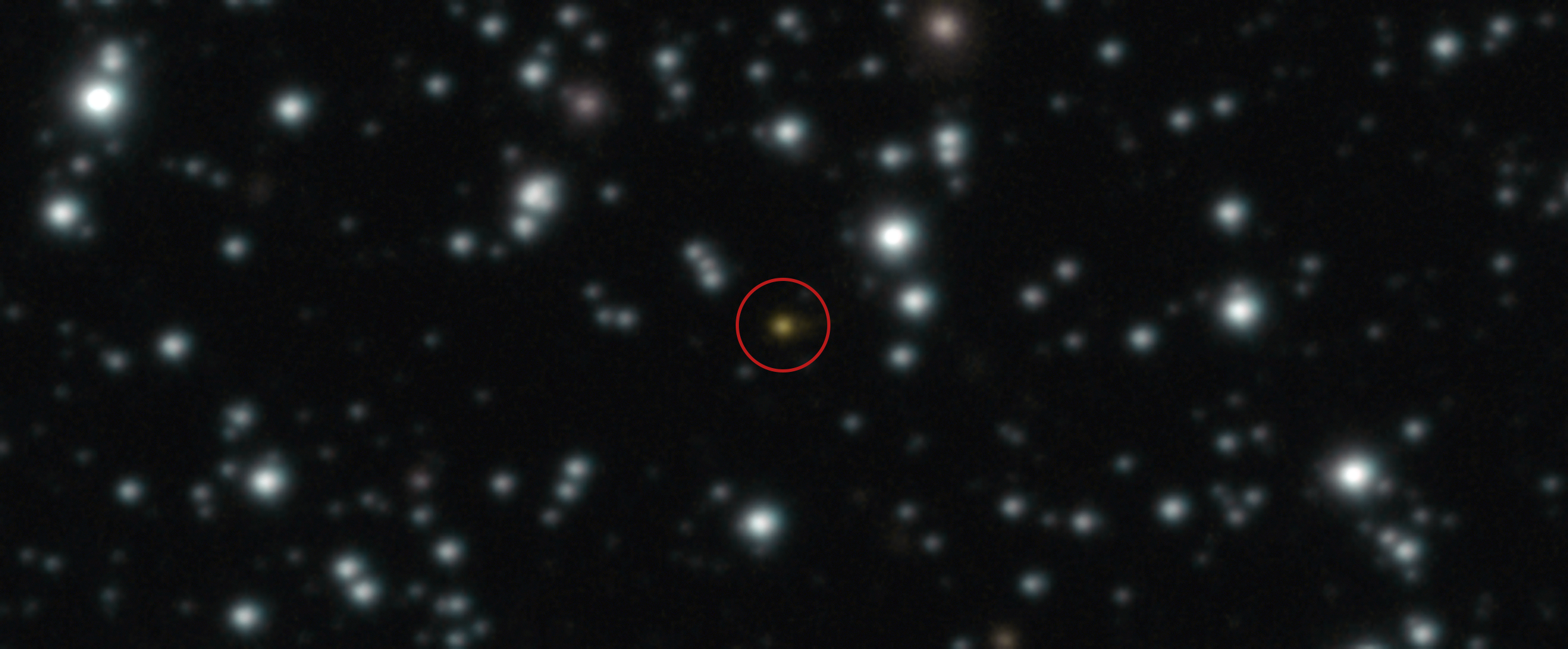
- GRB 250702B (circled in red), taken on 3 July with the VLT's HAWK-I infrared camera
- Event type: Gamma ray burst
- Right ascension: 18^{h} 58^{m} 45.565^{s}
- Declination: −7° 52′ 26.42″
- Redshift: ≲ 1
- Related media on Commons

GRB 250702BDE was a series of three distinct ultra-long extragalactic gamma-ray bursts (GRB) discovered by the Fermi Gamma-ray Space Telescope on July 2, 2025. GRB 250702B, the first event, is the longest duration gamma-ray burst ever discovered. The event consisted of three repeated GRB events (250702B, 250702D, and 250702E) lasting several hours from the same astronomical source, implying potential periodicity within the progenitor system.

== Discovery ==
It was initially detected by the Fermi Gamma-ray Space Telescope on July 2, 2025. About 10 hours earlier, the Einstein Probe had detected an associated X-ray transient.

It was initially believed to have originated inside the Milky Way. A day after the initial detection, the Very Large Telescope showed the source to be extragalactic; this was later confirmed by the Hubble Space Telescope.

== Origin ==
Characterized by three intensifying bursting events at integer multiple timescales, GRB 250702BDE is distinct from the gamma-ray burst population due to its duration and potential periodicity. Although its spectroscopic redshift is unknown, it is thought to lie at z ~ 1 due to the brightness of the event's host galaxy relative to the brightness of GRB hosts at higher redshifts. The event was likely caused by a relativistic tidal disruption event between a stellar-mass star and an intermediate-mass black hole (IMBH) or an unusual collapsar; however, the source remains enigmatic and may be further resolved with long-term observations.

== Gallery ==
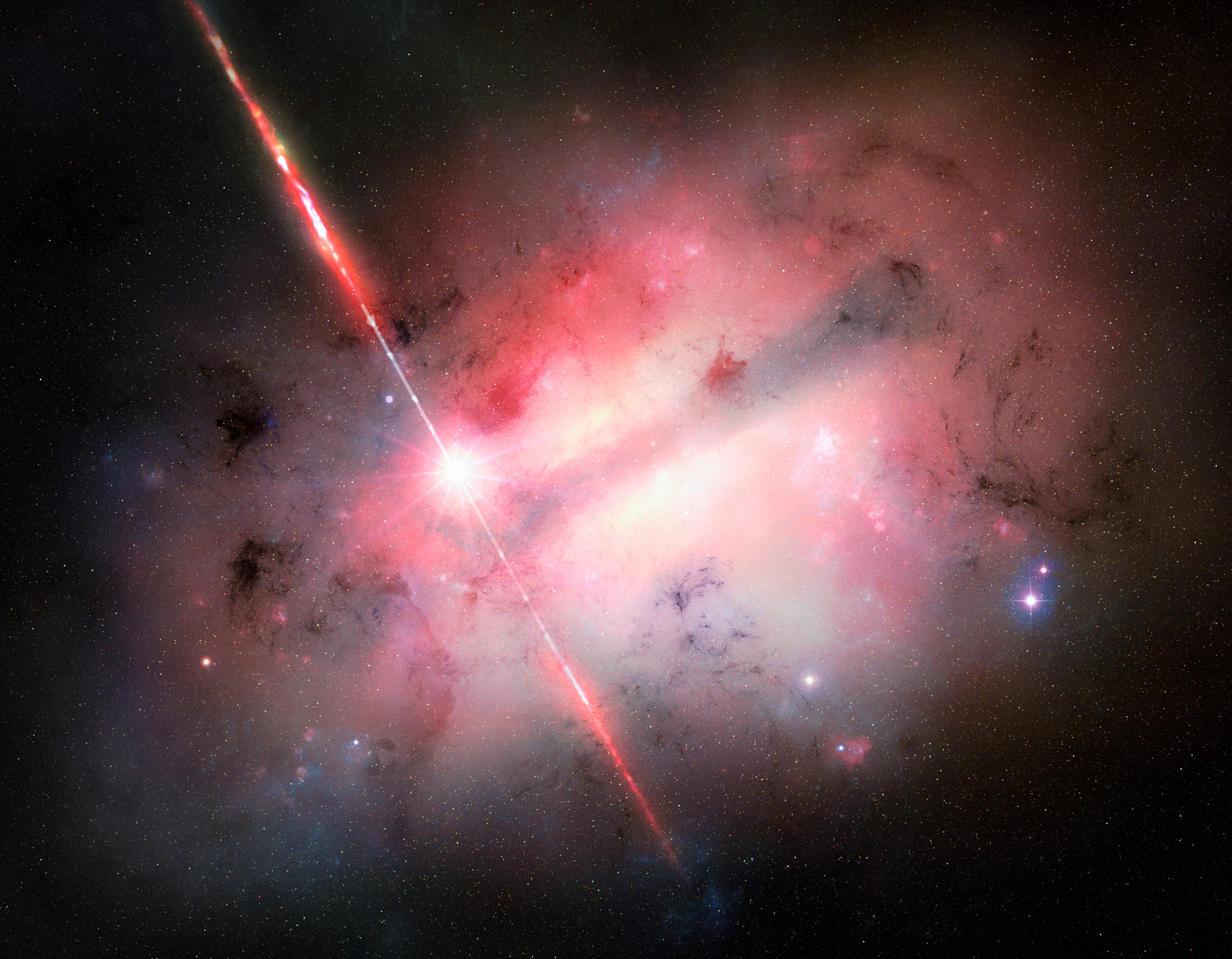
Artistic Representation of GRB 250702B

== See also ==
- GRB 111209A, the second longest lasting GRB at 7 hours

Preceded by GRB 111209A	Longest gamma-ray burst 2025 –
