= GRB 050509B =

Short duration gamma-ray burst source in constellation Coma Berenices

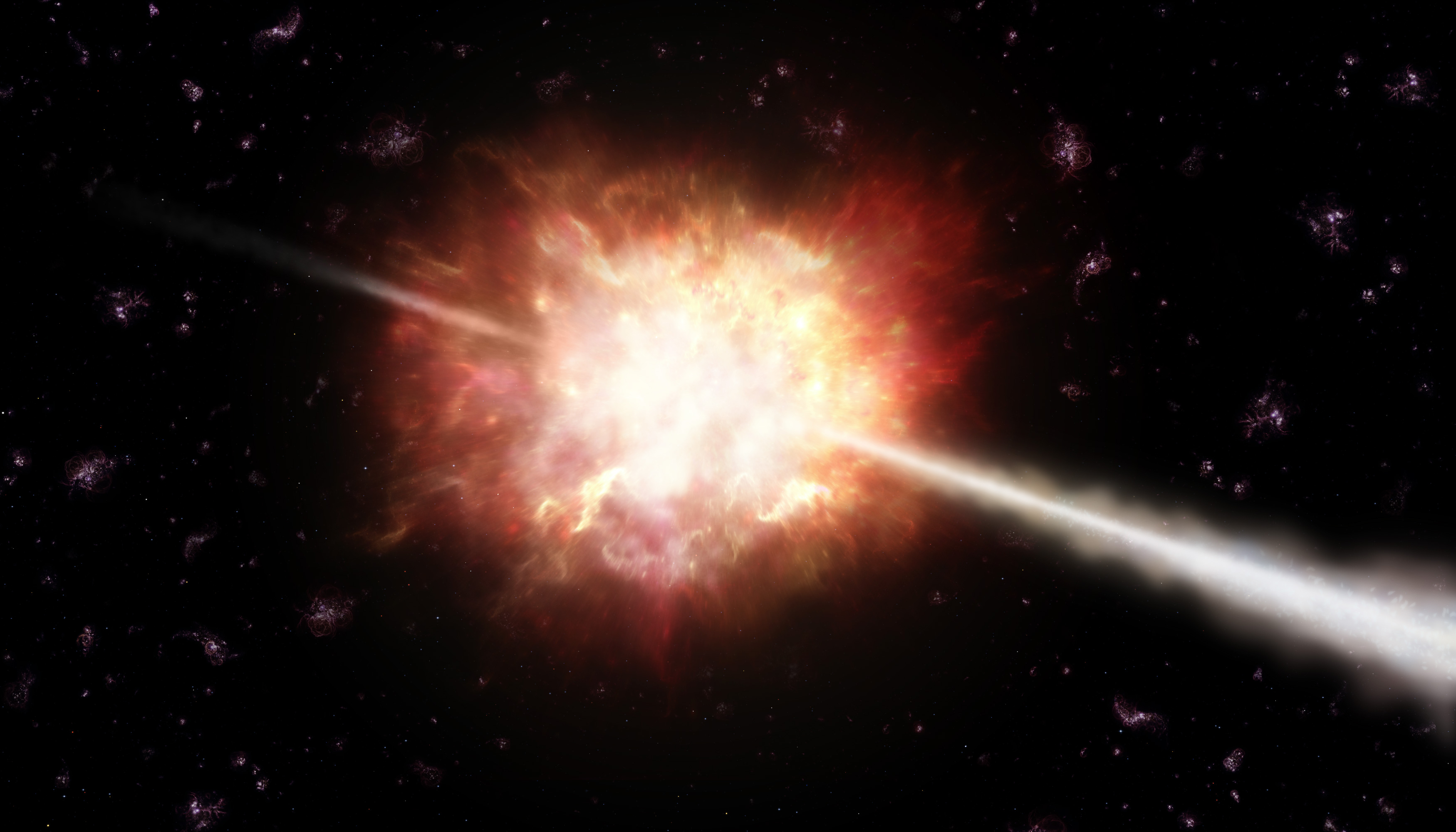
- Artist impression of a gamma-ray burst
- Event type: Gamma-ray burst
- Constellation: Coma Berenices
- Right ascension: 12^{h} 36^{m} 13.9^{s}
- Declination: +28° 59′ 01″
- Other designations: GRB 050509B

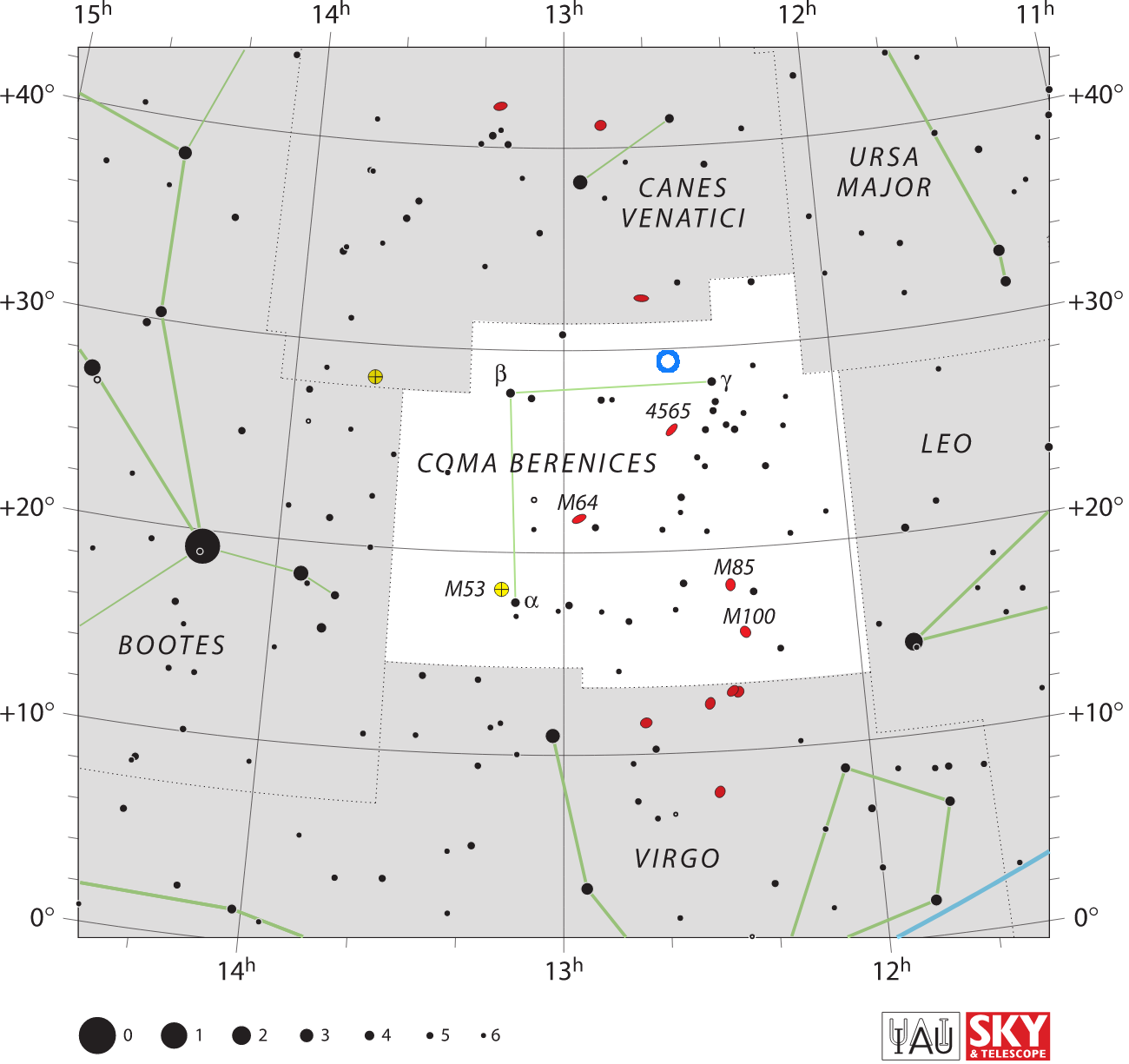
The location of GRB 050509B (circled in blue)

GRB 050509B was a gamma-ray burst (GRB) observed by the NASA Swift satellite on May 9, 2005. It was the first short duration GRB for which an accurate positional measurement was made, accurate enough to locate it near to an elliptical galaxy lying at a redshift of 0.225.

The significance of this finding is that it lends support to the theory that short bursts are formed during the catastrophic merger of two neutron stars, or a neutron star and a black hole. The orbital decay (via gravitational radiation) of stellar binaries consisting of these exotic compact objects is believed to take hundreds of millions of years, hence gamma ray bursts produced this way would be expected to be in old (misleadingly called "early type") galaxies. In contrast, long-duration gamma ray bursts, which are believed to result from the collapse of a single massive star, are expected to be located preferentially in young galaxies.
