= MightySat-1 =

American spacecraft

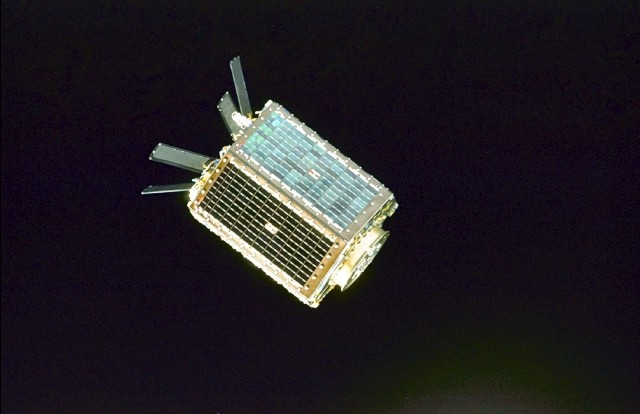
- MightySat-1 photograph
- Mission type: Technology
- Operator: AFRL
- COSPAR ID: 1998-069C
- SATCAT no.: 25551

Spacecraft properties
- Manufacturer: Spectrum Astro
- Launch mass: 320 kilograms (710 lb)
- Dry mass: 63.5 kilograms (140 lb)

Start of mission
- Launch date: December 4, 1998
- Rocket: Space Shuttle Endeavour (STS-88)
- Launch site: Kennedy LC-39A

End of mission
- Decay date: November 21, 1999, 17:11 UTC

Orbital parameters
- Reference system: Geocentric
- Regime: Low Earth
- Eccentricity: 0.00095976377
- Perigee altitude: 388.0 kilometers (241.1 mi)
- Apogee altitude: 401.0 kilometers (249.2 mi)
- Inclination: 51.6& degrees
- Period: 92.4 minutes
- Epoch: January 4, 1999

MightySat-1 was a small spacecraft developed by the U.S. Air Force's Phillips Laboratory (now part of the Air Force Research Laboratory Space Vehicles Directorate) to test technology for small satellites, including advanced dual-junction solar cells, a composite structure, a micrometeorite and debris detector, low-power electronics and a low-shock release device. The 140-pound satellite was launched from the Space Shuttle Endeavour in December 1998, during the 12th day of the STS-88 mission and performed robustly in orbit, with no spacecraft anomalies during its mission. Lt. Barbara Braun of the AFRL was the program manager for the satellite.

MightySat-1's mission ended when it re-entered the atmosphere at 17:11 UTC on November 21, 1999.
