= Ultraviolet/Optical Telescope =

Instrument on the Swift satellite

The Ultraviolet and Optical Telescope (UVOT) is one of three instruments on board the Neil Gehrels Swift Observatory that observes astronomical objects in its 17-by-17 arc minute field of view through one of several filters or grisms. The seven filters, which are similar to those on the XMM-Newton Optical Monitor instrument, cover the near-ultraviolet and optical range. The brightness of an object observed in the three optical filters, called u, b, and v, can be converted into the more common Johnson-Morgan (see the UBV photometric system) magnitudes. The three ultraviolet filters probe a spectral region that is not observable from the ground.

Although Swift's main mission is to chase gamma-ray bursts as soon as they occur, UVOT has been used to observe and measure many other transient celestial sources as well.

The filters, not being like any other photometric system in use from the ground or in space, give unique photometric measurements. Their response has been defined as the UVOT photometric system, as outlined by T. S. Poole et al.

== See also ==
- Stellar classification
