= NGC 2770 =

Spiral galaxy in the constellation Lynx

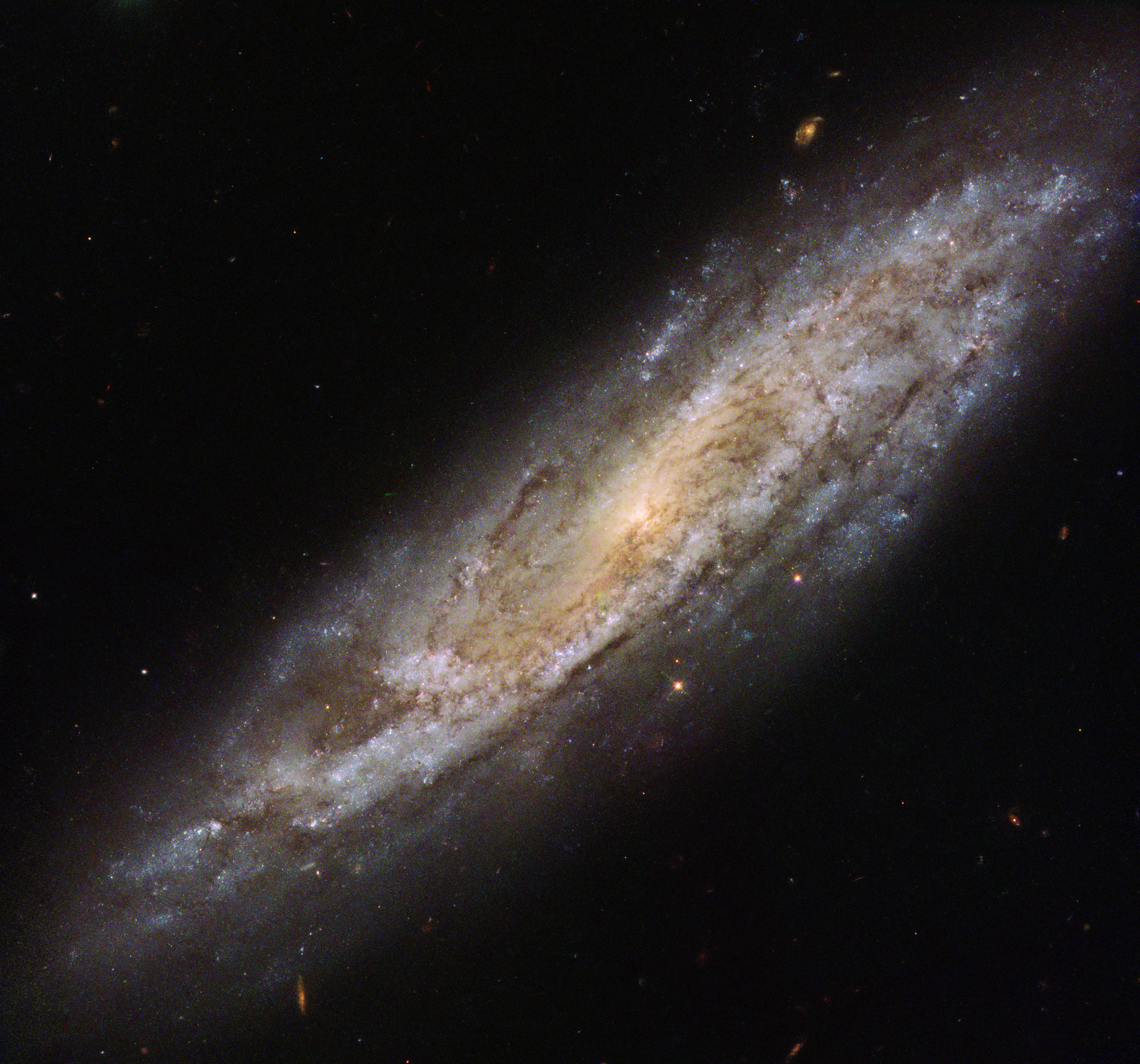
- NGC 2770 imaged by the Hubble Space Telescope in 2020

Observation data (J2000 epoch)
- Constellation: Lynx
- Right ascension: 09^{h} 09^{m} 33.622^{s}
- Declination: +33° 07′ 24.29″
- Redshift: 1943±1 km/s
- Distance: 77 Mly (24 Mpc); 88 Mly (27 Mpc)
- Apparent magnitude (V): 12.0

Characteristics
- Type: SBc
- Apparent size (V): 1.967′ × 0.511′ (NIR)
- Notable features: Four supernovae

Other designations
- HOLM 111A, IRAS 09065+3319, UGC 4806, MCG +06-20-038, PGC 25806, CGCG 180-047

NGC 2770 is a spiral galaxy in the northern constellation of Lynx, near the northern constellation border with Cancer. It was discovered by German-born astronomer William Herschel on December 7, 1785. J. L. E. Dreyer described it as, "faint, large, much extended 150°, mottled but not resolved, 2 stars to north". NGC 2770 was the target for the first binocular image produced by the Large Binocular Telescope.

The morphological classification of SBc indicates a barred spiral with moderately-wound arms. The physical properties of this galaxy are similar to those of the Milky Way. The combined mass of stars in the galaxy is estimated at 2.1×10^{10} M_{☉}, and it has a star formation rate of ~1.1 M_{☉} y^{−1}. There are no apparent perturbations of the galaxy due to suspected interaction with the companion galaxy, NGC 2770B.

== Supernovae ==
The Type Ib supernova Supernova 2008D in galaxy NGC 2770, shown in X-ray (left) and visible light (right)

Four supernovae have been observed in NGC 2770 within a twenty years span. This high rate is considered anomalous for an ordinary galaxy. The explanation may lie in a recently enhanced star formation rate due to interaction with a companion galaxy.

- SN 1999eh (Type Ib, mag. 17.5) was discovered by Mark Armstrong on 12 October 1999.
- SN 2007uy (Type Ib, mag. 17.2) was discovered by Yoji Hirose on 31 December 2007.
- SN 2008D (Type Ib, mag. 17.5) was discovered by NASA's Swift X-ray telescope on 9 January 2008, while observing SN 2007uy. It was the first supernova detected by the X-rays released very early on in its formation, rather than by the optical light emitted during the later stages, which allowed the first moments of the outburst to be observed. It is possible that NGC 2770's interactions with a suspected companion galaxy may have created the massive stars causing this activity.
- SN 2015bh was discovered by the Catalina Real-time Transient Survey and Stan Howerton on 7 February 2015, and was either a Type II supernova or the hyper-eruption of a luminous blue variable.

== See also ==
- List of NGC objects (2001–3000)
