= Spectrum Astro =

Aerospace and defense manufacturer in the United States

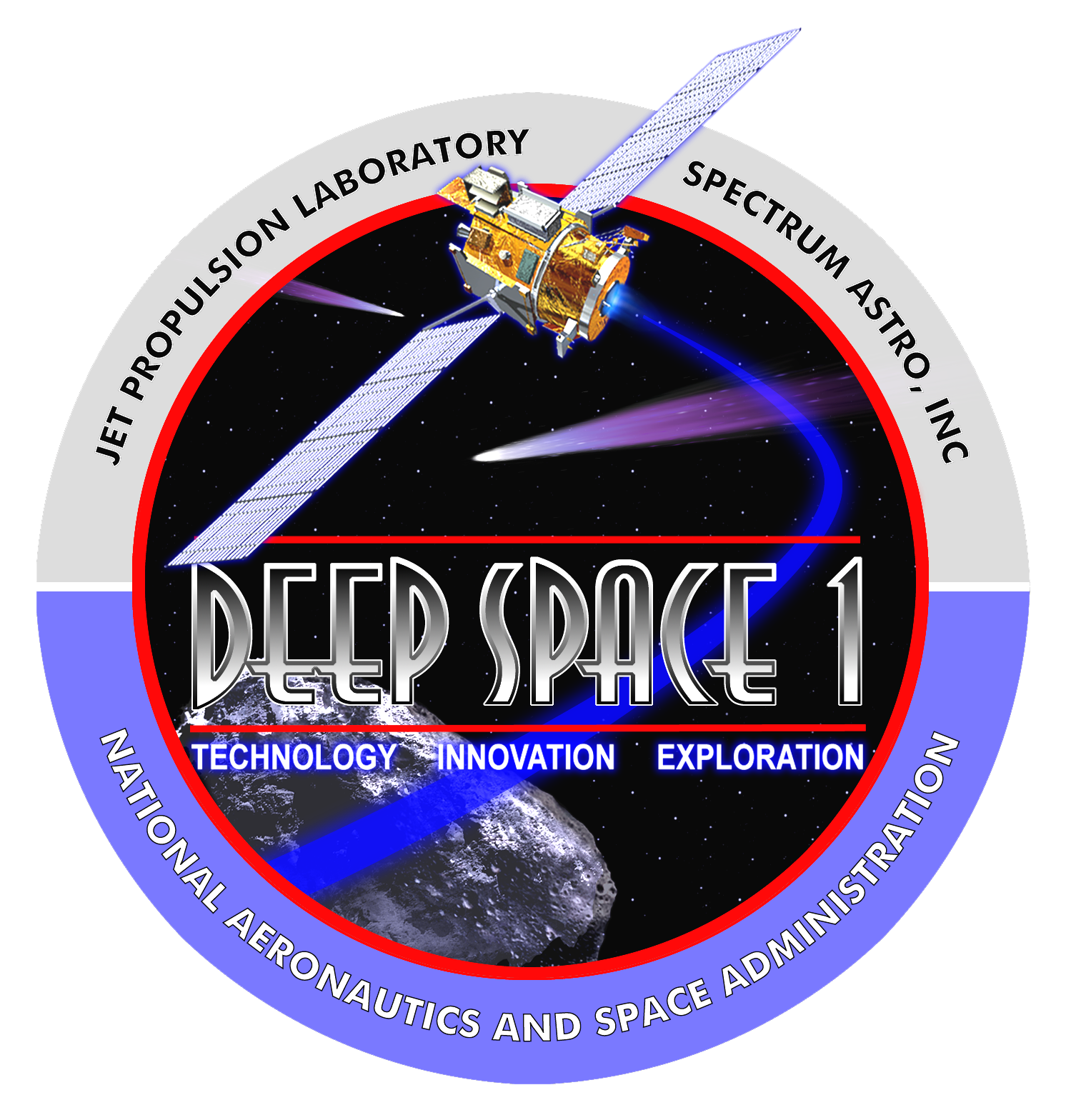
- Company type: Private
- Industry: Aerospace, Defense
- Predecessor: Orbital Science Corp.
- Founded: 1988
- Founder: W. David Thompson
- Headquarters: Gilbert, Arizona, United States
- Area served: Worldwide
- Products: Deep Space 1, MightySat-1, MSTI 1, MSTI 2, MSTI 3, Hessi, SA-200B, SA-200HP, SA-200LL, SA-200S, Xenon Ion Propulsion, AstroRT

Spectrum Astro was a privately held American corporation that designed, manufactured, and sold satellites. Spectrum Astro's, at the time, unique satellite production method was to design and manufacture space satellites, in their entirety, at a single research, design and manufacturing site. This novel idea allowed for lower cost and more reliable satellites which were able to be fully tested as a whole before launch. The Spectrum Astro plant, located in Gilbert, Arizona, had especially wide hallways and internal bay doors to rooms which allowed for satellites to be easily transported within the building for various stages of design, assembly, and testing.

Spectrum Astro was founded by W. David Thompson in 1988, with $5,000 in cash and a credit card, and finished its first year in operation with $27,000 in revenue. In 2004, the company was sold to General Dynamics.
