= Type Ib and Ic supernovae =

Types of supernovae caused by a star collapsing

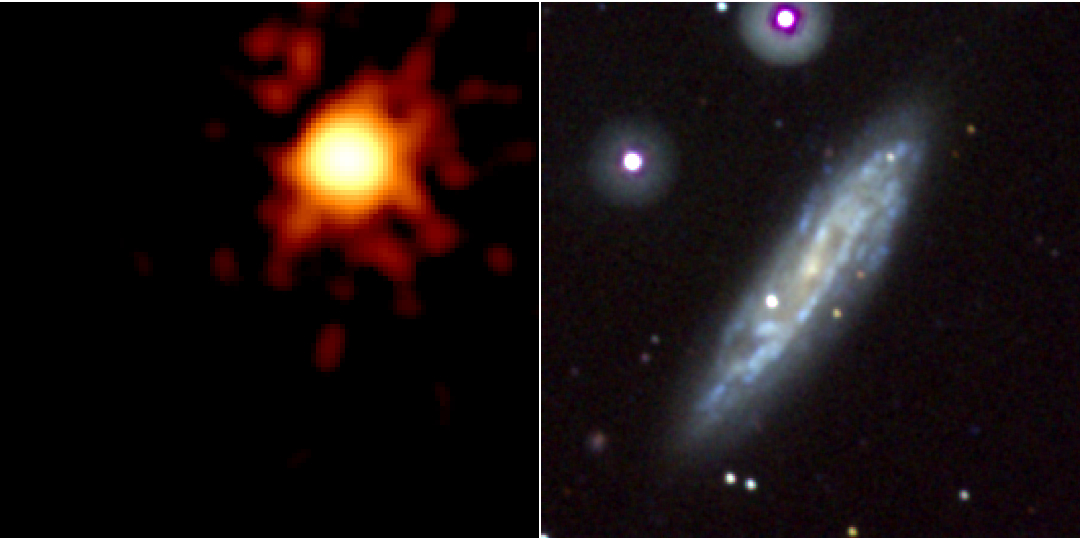
The Type Ib supernova SN 2008D in galaxy NGC 2770, shown in X-ray (left) and visible light (right), at the corresponding positions of the images. (NASA image.)

Type Ib and Type Ic supernovae are categories of supernovae that are caused by the stellar core collapse of massive stars. These stars have shed or been stripped of their outer envelope of hydrogen, and, when compared to the spectrum of Type Ia supernovae, they lack the absorption line of silicon. Compared to Type Ib, Type Ic supernovae are hypothesized to have lost more of their initial envelope, including most of their helium.

== Spectra ==
When a supernova is observed, it can be categorized in the Minkowski–Zwicky supernova classification scheme based upon the absorption lines that appear in its spectrum. A supernova is first categorized as either a Type I or Type II, then subcategorized based on more specific traits. Supernovae belonging to the general category Type I lack hydrogen lines in their spectra; in contrast to Type II supernovae which do display lines of hydrogen. The Type I category is subdivided into Type Ia, Type Ib and Type Ic.

Type Ib/Ic supernovae are distinguished from Type Ia by the lack of an absorption line of singly ionized silicon at a wavelength of 635.5 nanometres. As Type Ib and Ic supernovae age, they also display lines from elements such as oxygen, calcium and magnesium. In contrast, Type Ia spectra become dominated by lines of iron. Type Ic supernovae are distinguished from Type Ib in that the former also lack lines of helium at 587.6 nm.

== Formation ==
The onion-like layers of an evolved, massive star (not to scale).

Prior to becoming a supernova, an evolved massive star resembles an onion in that it contains many layers of different elements, each undergoing fusion. The outermost layer consists of hydrogen, followed by helium, carbon, oxygen, and so forth. Thus when the outer envelope of hydrogen is shed, this exposes the next layer that consists primarily of helium (mixed with other elements). This can occur when a very hot, massive star reaches a point in its evolution when significant mass loss is occurring from its stellar wind. Highly massive stars (with 25 or more times the mass of the Sun) can lose up to 10^{−5} solar masses (M_{☉}) each year—the equivalent of 1 M_{☉} every 100,000 years.

Supernovae vs initial mass and metallicity

Type Ib and Ic supernovae are hypothesized to have been produced by core collapse of massive stars that have lost their outer layer of hydrogen and helium, either via winds or mass transfer to a companion. The progenitors of Types Ib and Ic have lost most of their outer envelopes due to strong stellar winds or else from interaction with a close companion. Rapid mass loss can occur in the case of a Wolf–Rayet star, and these massive objects show a spectrum that is lacking in hydrogen. Type Ib progenitors have ejected most of the hydrogen in their outer atmospheres, while Type Ic progenitors have lost both the hydrogen and helium shells; in other words, Type Ic have lost more of their envelope (i.e., much of the helium layer) than the progenitors of Type Ib. In other respects, however, the underlying mechanism behind Type Ib and Ic supernovae is similar to that of a Type II supernova, thus placing Types Ib and Ic between Type Ia and Type II. Because of their similarity, Type Ib and Ic supernovae are sometimes collectively called Type Ibc supernovae.

There is some evidence that a small fraction of the Type Ic supernovae may be the progenitors of gamma ray bursts (GRBs); in particular, Type Ic supernovae that have broad spectral lines corresponding to high-velocity outflows are thought to be strongly associated with GRBs. However, it is also hypothesized that any hydrogen-stripped Type Ib or Ic supernova could be a GRB, dependent upon the geometry of the explosion. In any case, astronomers believe that most Type Ib, and probably Type Ic as well, result from core collapse in stripped, massive stars, rather than from the thermonuclear runaway of white dwarfs.

As they are formed from rare, very massive stars, the rate of Type Ib and Ic supernova occurrence is much lower than the corresponding rate for Type II supernovae. They normally occur in regions of new star formation, and are extremely rare in elliptical galaxies. Because they share a similar operating mechanism, Type Ibc and the various Type II supernovae are collectively called core-collapse supernovae. In particular, Type Ibc may be referred to as stripped core-collapse supernovae.

== Light curves ==
The light curves (a plot of luminosity versus time) of Type Ib supernovae vary in form, but in some cases can be nearly identical to those of Type Ia supernovae. However, Type Ib light curves may peak at lower luminosity and may be redder. In the infrared portion of the spectrum, the light curve of a Type Ib supernova is similar to a Type II-L light curve. Type Ib supernovae usually have slower decline rates for the spectral curves than Ic.

Type Ia supernovae light curves are useful for measuring distances on a cosmological scale. That is, they serve as standard candles. However, due to the similarity of the spectra of Type Ib and Ic supernovae, the latter can form a source of contamination of supernova surveys and must be carefully removed from the observed samples before making distance estimates.

== See also ==
- Type Ia supernova
- Type II supernova
