= History of supernova observation =

Ancient and modern recorded observations of supernovae explosions

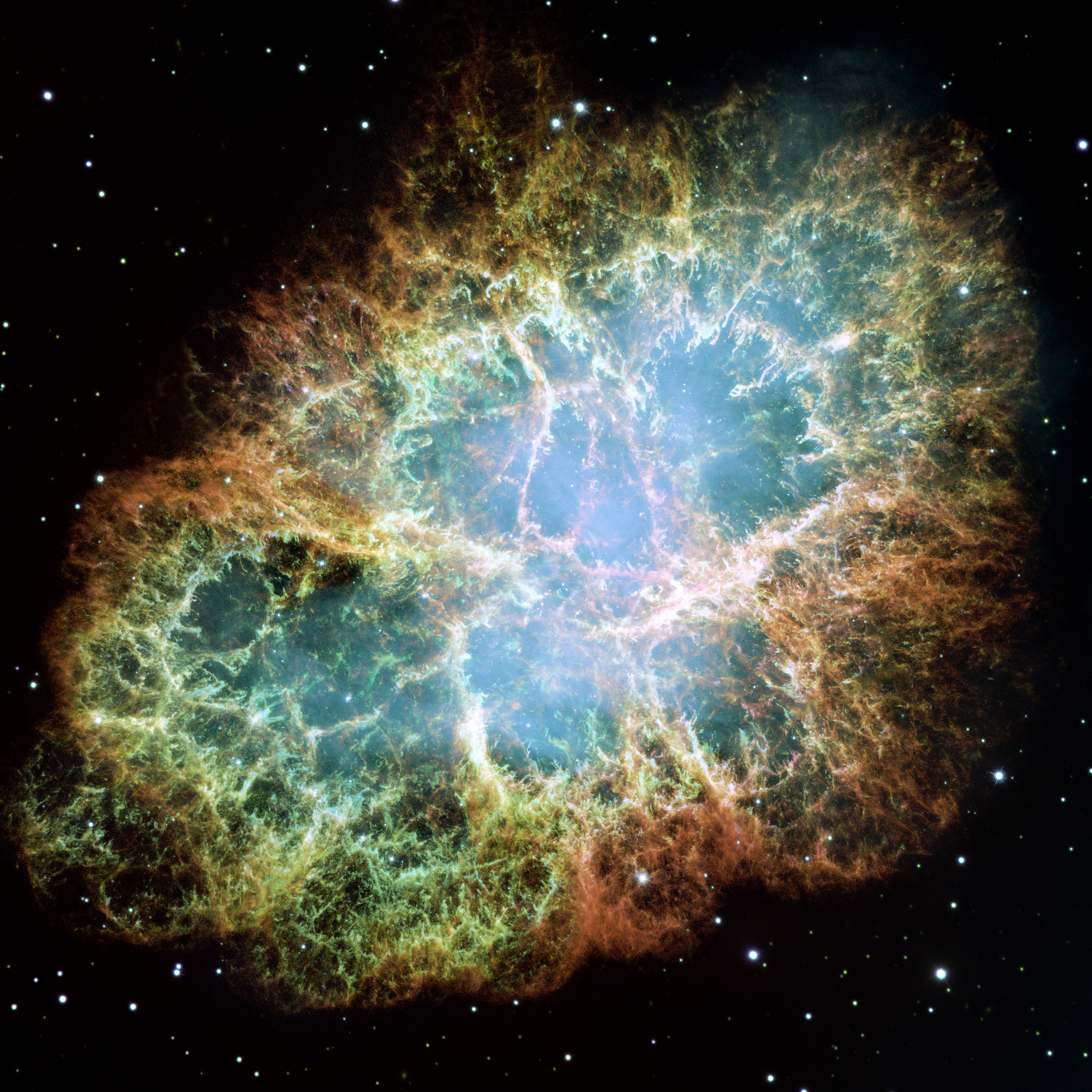
The Crab Nebula is a pulsar wind nebula associated with the 1054 supernova.

The known history of supernova observation goes back to 1006 AD. All earlier proposals for supernova observations are speculations with many alternatives.

Since the development of the telescope, the field of supernova discovery has expanded to other galaxies. These occurrences provide important information on the distances of galaxies. Successful models of supernova behavior have also been developed, and the role of supernovae in the star formation process is now increasingly understood.

== Early history ==
| Year | Observed location | Maximum brightness m | Certainty of suggestion |
|---|---|---|---|
| 185 | Centaurus | −6 | Suggested SN, also suggested comet |
| 386 | Sagittarius | +1,5 | Uncertain, suggested SN, possible nova or supernova |
| 393 | Scorpius | −3 | Possible SN, possible nova |
| 1006 | Lupus | −7,5±0,4 | Certain: known SNR |
| 1054 | Taurus | −6 | Certain: known SNR and pulsar |
| 1181 | Cassiopeia | −2 | Certain: known SNR |
| 1572 | Cassiopeia | −4 | Certain: known SNR |
| 1604 | Ophiuchus | −2 | Certain: known SNR |

In the year 185 CE, Han dynasty astronomers recorded the appearance of a bright star in the sky, and observed that it took about eight months to fade from the sky. It was observed to sparkle like a star and did not move across the heavens like a comet. These observations are consistent with the appearance of a supernova, and this is believed to be the oldest confirmed record of a supernova event by humankind. SN 185 may have also possibly been recorded in Roman literature, though no records have survived. The gaseous shell RCW 86 is suspected as being the remnant of this event, and recent X-ray studies show a good match for the expected age. It was also recorded in the Book of the Later Han, which told the history of China from 25 to 220 AD.

In 393 CE, the Chinese recorded the appearance of another "guest star", SN 393, in the modern constellation of Scorpius. Additional unconfirmed supernovae events may have been observed in 369 CE (unlikely SN), 386 CE (unlikely), 437 CE, 827 CE and 902 CE. However these have not yet been associated with a supernova remnant, and so they remain only candidates. Over a span of about 2,000 years, Chinese astronomers recorded a total of twenty such candidate events, including later explosions noted by Islamic, European, and possibly Indian and other observers.

The supernova SN 1006 appeared in the southern constellation of Lupus during the year 1006 CE. This was the brightest recorded star ever to appear in the night sky, and its presence was noted in China, Egypt, Iraq, Italy, Japan and Switzerland. It may also have been noted in France, Syria, and North America. Egyptian astrologer Ali ibn Ridwan gave the brightness of this star as one-quarter the brightness of the Moon. Modern astronomers have discovered the faint remnant of this explosion and determined that it was only 7,100 light-years from Earth.

Supernova SN 1054 was another widely observed event, with astronomers recording the star's appearance in 1054 CE. It may also have been recorded, along with other supernovae, by the Ancestral Puebloans in present day New Mexico as a four pointed star shaped petroglyph. This explosion appeared in the constellation of Taurus, where it produced the Crab Nebula remnant. At its peak, the luminosity of SN 1054 may have been four times as bright as Venus, and it remained visible in daylight for 23 days and was visible in the night sky for 653 days.

There are fewer records of supernova SN 1181, which occurred in the constellation Cassiopeia just over a century after SN 1054. It was noted by Chinese and Japanese astronomers, however. The pulsar 3C58 was considered as the most likely the stellar relic from this event. The event had been under discussion for long time but in 2021 another candidate was proposed for the remnant, the recently discovered nebula Pa 30 which has been found to be about 1000 years old.

The Danish astronomer Tycho Brahe was noted for his careful observations of the night sky from his observatory on the island of Hven. In 1572 he noted the appearance of a new star, also in the constellation Cassiopeia. Later called SN 1572, this supernova was associated with a remnant during the 1960s.

A common belief in Europe during this period was the Aristotelian idea that the cosmos beyond the Moon and planets was immutable (unchanging over time), so observers argued that the phenomenon was something in the Earth's atmosphere. However, Tycho noted that the object remained stationary from night to night—never changing its parallax—so it must lie far away. He published his observations in the small book De nova et nullius aevi memoria prius visa stella (Latin for "Concerning the new and previously unseen star") in 1573. It is from the title of this book that the modern word nova for cataclysmic variable stars is derived.

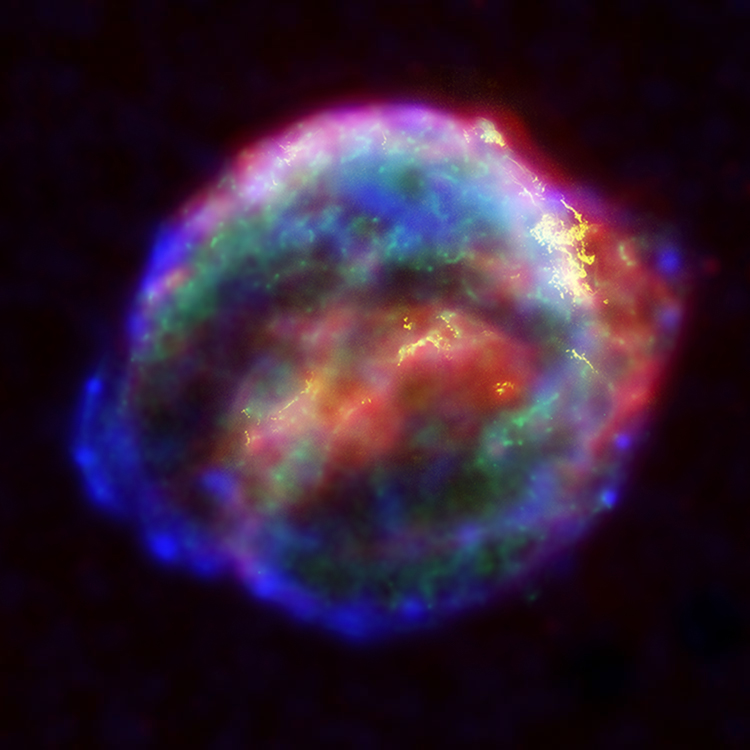
Multiwavelength X-ray image of the remnant of Kepler's Supernova, SN 1604. (Chandra X-ray Observatory)

The most recent supernova to be seen in the Milky Way galaxy was SN 1604, which was observed on October 9, 1604. Several people, including Johannes van Heeck, noted the sudden appearance of this star, but it was Johannes Kepler who became noted for his systematic study of the object itself. He published his observations in the work De Stella nova in pede Serpentarii.

Galileo, like Tycho before him, tried in vain to measure the parallax of this new star, and then argued against the Aristotelian view of an immutable heavens. The remnant of this supernova was identified in 1941 at the Mount Wilson Observatory.

== Telescope observation ==
The true nature of the supernova remained obscure for some time. Observers slowly came to recognize a class of stars that undergo long-term periodic fluctuations in luminosity. Both John Russell Hind in 1848 and Norman Pogson in 1863 had charted stars that underwent sudden changes in brightness. However, these received little attention from the astronomical community. Finally, in 1866, English astronomer William Huggins made the first spectroscopic observations of a nova, discovering lines of hydrogen in the unusual spectrum of the recurrent nova T Coronae Borealis. Huggins proposed a cataclysmic explosion as the underlying mechanism, and his efforts drew interest from other astronomers.

Animation showing the sky position of supernovae discovered since 1885. Some recent survey contributions are highlighted in color.

In 1885, a nova-like outburst was observed in the direction of the Andromeda Galaxy by Ernst Hartwig in Estonia. S Andromedae increased to 6th magnitude, outshining the entire nucleus of the galaxy, then faded in a manner much like a nova. In 1917, George W. Ritchey measured the distance to the Andromeda Galaxy and discovered it lay much farther than had previously been thought. This meant that S Andromedae, which did not just lie along the line of sight to the galaxy but had actually resided in the nucleus, released a much greater amount of energy than was typical for a nova.

Early work on this new category of nova was performed during the 1930s by Walter Baade and Fritz Zwicky at Mount Wilson Observatory. They identified S Andromedae, what they considered a typical nova, as an explosive event that released radiation approximately equal to the Sun's total energy output for 10^{7} years. They decided to call this new class of cataclysmic variables super-novae, and postulated that the energy was generated by the gravitational collapse of ordinary stars into neutron stars. The name super-novae was first used in a 1931 lecture at Caltech by Zwicky, then used publicly in 1933 at a meeting of the American Physical Society. By 1938, the hyphen had been lost and the modern name was in use.

Although supernovae thought to occur on average about once every 50 years in the Milky Way, observations of distant galaxies allowed supernovae to be discovered and examined more frequently. The first supernova detection patrol was begun by Zwicky in 1933. He was joined by Josef J. Johnson from Caltech in 1936. Using a 45-cm Schmidt telescope at Palomar Observatory, they discovered twelve new supernovae within three years by comparing new photographic plates to reference images of extragalactic regions.

In 1938, Walter Baade became the first astronomer to identify a nebula as a supernova remnant when he suggested that the Crab Nebula was the remains of SN 1054. He noted that, while it had the appearance of a planetary nebula, the measured velocity of expansion was much too large to belong to that classification. During the same year, Baade first proposed the use of the Type Ia supernova as a secondary distance indicator. Later, the work of Allan Sandage and Gustav Tammann helped refine the process so that Type Ia supernovae became a type of standard candle for measuring large distances across the cosmos.

The first spectral classification of these distant supernovae was performed by Rudolph Minkowski in 1941. He categorized them into two types, based on whether or not lines of the element hydrogen appeared in the supernova spectrum. Zwicky later proposed additional types III, IV, and V, although these are no longer used and now appear to be associated with single peculiar supernova types. Further sub-division of the spectra categories resulted in the modern supernova classification scheme.

In the aftermath of the Second World War, Fred Hoyle worked on the problem of how the various observed elements in the universe were produced. In 1946 he proposed that a massive star could generate the necessary thermonuclear reactions, and the nuclear reactions of heavy elements were responsible for the removal of energy necessary for a gravitational collapse to occur. The collapsing star became rotationally unstable, and produced an explosive expulsion of elements that were distributed into interstellar space. The concept that rapid nuclear fusion was the source of energy for a supernova explosion was developed by Hoyle and William Fowler during the 1960s.

The first computer-controlled search for supernovae was begun in the 1960s at Northwestern University. They built a 24-inch telescope at Corralitos Observatory in New Mexico that could be repositioned under computer control. The telescope displayed a new galaxy each minute, with observers checking the view on a television screen. By this means, they discovered 14 supernovae over a period of two years.

== 1970–1999 ==
The modern standard model for Type Ia supernovae explosions is founded on a proposal by Whelan and Iben in 1973, and is based upon a mass-transfer scenario to a degenerate companion star. In particular, the light curve of SN 1972E in NGC 5253, which was observed for more than a year, was followed long enough to discover that after its broad "hump" in brightness, the supernova faded at a nearly constant rate of about 0.01 magnitudes per day. Translated to another system of units, this is nearly the same as the decay rate of cobalt-56 (^{56}Co), whose half-life is 77 days. The degenerate explosion model predicts the production of about a solar mass of nickel-56 (^{56}Ni) by the exploding star. The ^{56}Ni decays with a half-life of 6.8 days to ^{56}Co, and the decay of the nickel and cobalt provides the energy radiated away by the supernova late in its history. The agreement in both total energy production and the fade rate between the theoretical models and the observations of 1972e led to rapid acceptance of the degenerate-explosion model.

Through observation of the light curves of many Type Ia supernovae, it was discovered that they appear to have a common peak luminosity. By measuring the luminosity of these events, the distance to their host galaxy can be estimated with good accuracy. Thus this category of supernovae has become highly useful as a standard candle for measuring cosmic distances. In 1998, the High-Z Supernova Search and the Supernova Cosmology Project discovered that the most distant Type Ia supernovae appeared dimmer than expected. This has provided evidence that the expansion of the universe may be accelerating.

Although no supernova has been observed in the Milky Way since 1604, it appears that a supernova exploded in the constellation Cassiopeia about 300 years ago, around the year 1667 or 1680. The remnant of this explosion, Cassiopeia A—is heavily obscured by interstellar dust, which is possibly why it did not make a notable appearance. However it can be observed in other parts of the spectrum, and it is currently the brightest radio source beyond the Solar System.

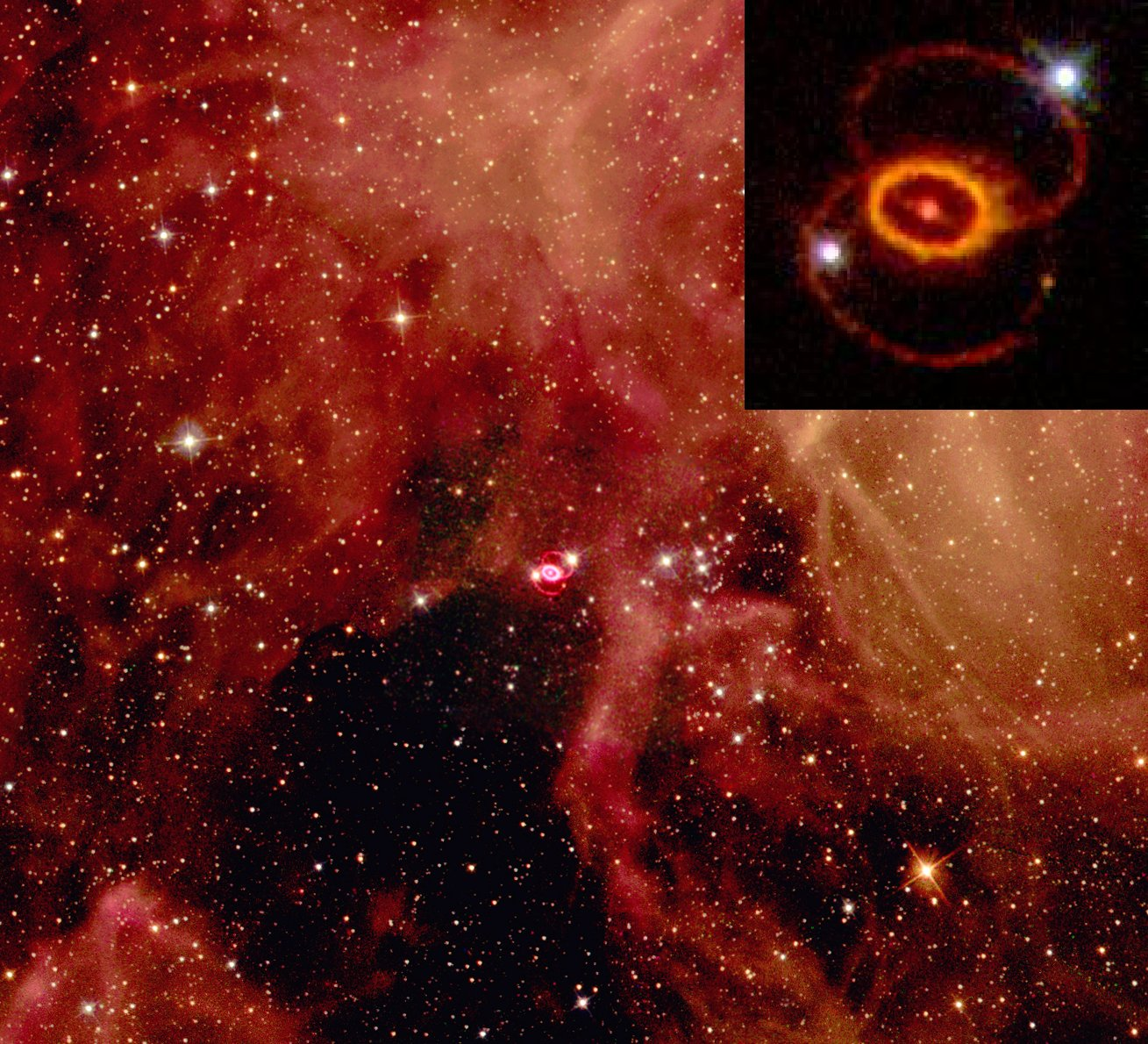
Supernova 1987A remnant near the center

In 1987, Supernova 1987A in the Large Magellanic Cloud was observed within hours of its light reaching the Earth. It was the first supernova to be detected through its neutrino emission and the first to be observed across every band of the electromagnetic spectrum. The relative proximity of this supernova has allowed detailed observation, and it provided the first opportunity for modern theories of supernova formation to be tested against observations.

The rate of supernova discovery steadily increased throughout the twentieth century. In the 1990s, several automated supernova search programs were initiated. The Leuschner Observatory Supernova Search program was begun in 1992 at Leuschner Observatory. It was joined the same year by the Berkeley Automated Imaging Telescope program. These were succeeded in 1996 by the Katzman Automatic Imaging Telescope at Lick Observatory, which was primarily used for the Lick Observatory Supernova Search (LOSS). By 2000, the Lick program resulted in the discovery of 96 supernovae, making it the world's most successful Supernova search program.

In the late 1990s it was proposed that recent supernova remnants could be found by looking for gamma rays from the decay of titanium-44. This has a half-life of 90 years and the gamma rays can traverse the galaxy easily, so it permits us to see any remnants from the last millennium or so. Two sources were found, the previously discovered Cassiopeia A remnant, and the RX J0852.0-4622 remnant, which had just been discovered overlapping the Vela Supernova Remnant

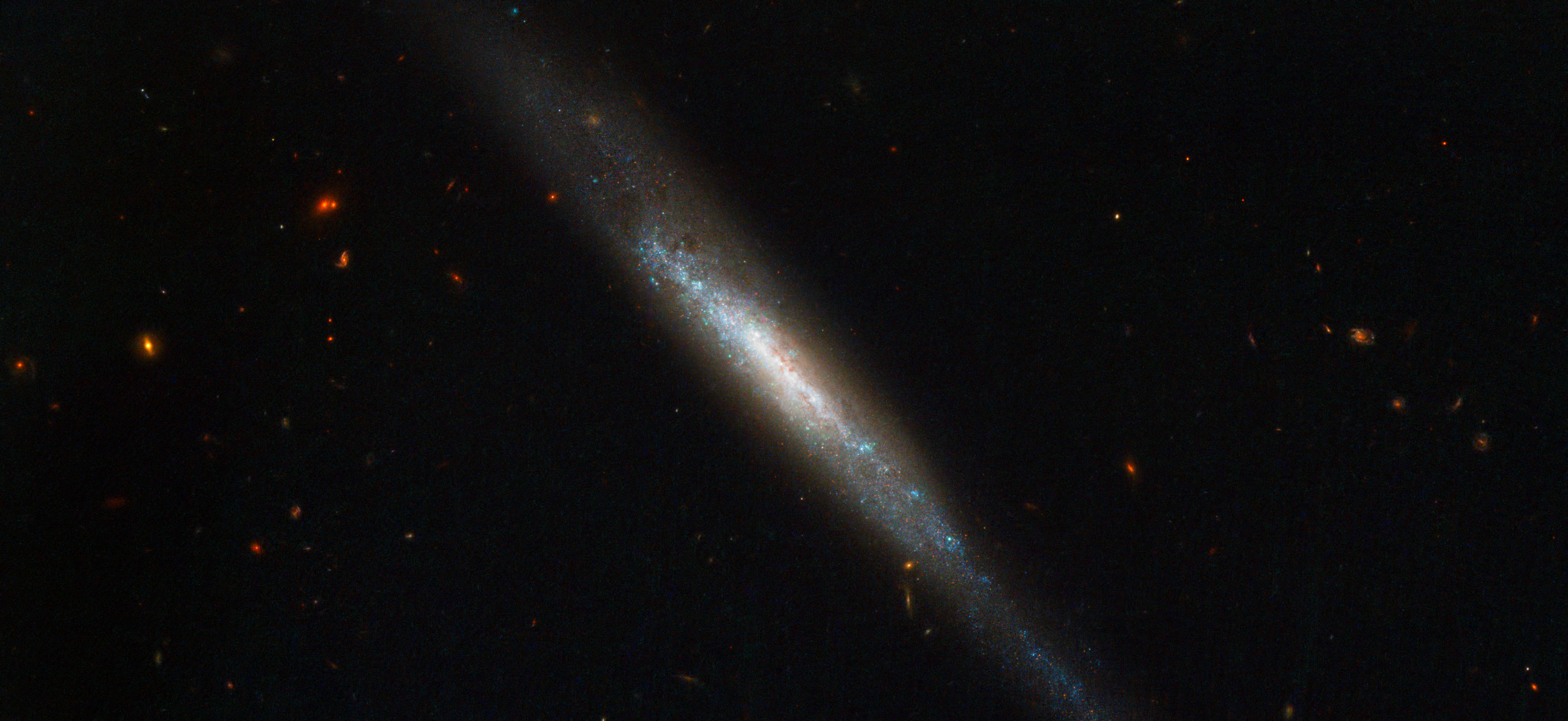
In 1999 a star within IC 755 was seen to explode as a supernova and named SN 1999an.

This remnant (RX J0852.0-4622) had been found in front (apparently) of the larger Vela Supernova Remnant. The gamma rays from the decay of titanium-44 showed that it must have exploded fairly recently (perhaps around 1200 AD), but there is no historical record of it. The flux of gamma rays and x-rays indicates that the supernova was relatively close to us (perhaps 200 parsecs or 600 ly). If so, this is a surprising event because supernovae less than 200 parsecs away are estimated to occur less than once per 100,000 years.

== 2000 to present ==
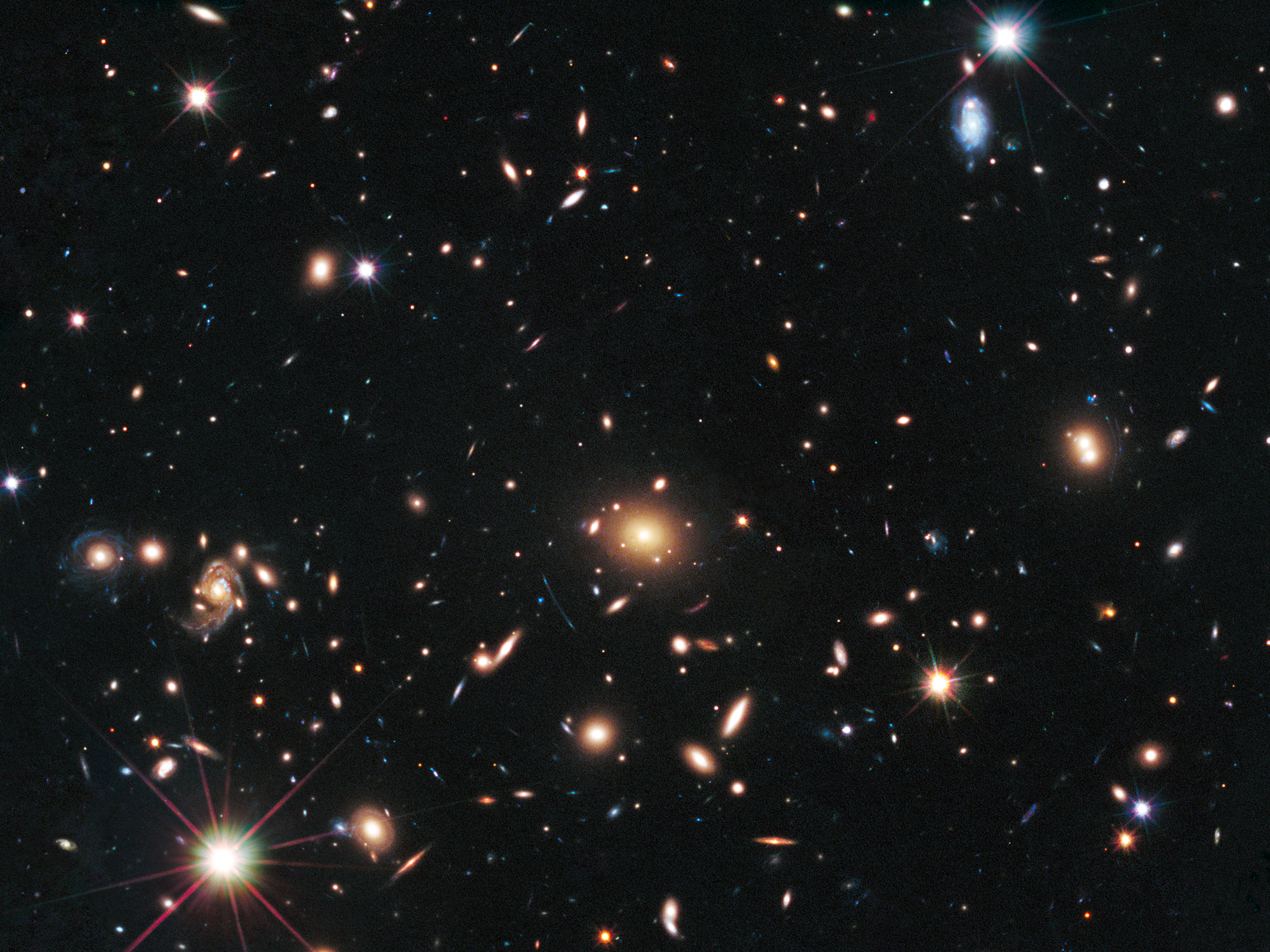
Cosmic lens MACS J1720+35 helps Hubble to find a distant supernova.

SN 2003fg was discovered in a forming galaxy in 2003. The appearance of this supernova was studied in "real-time", and it has posed several major physical questions as it seems more massive than the Chandrasekhar limit would allow.

First observed in September 2006, the supernova SN 2006gy, which occurred in a galaxy called NGC 1260 (240 million light-years away), is the largest and, until confirmation of luminosity of SN 2005ap in October 2007, the most luminous supernova ever observed. The explosion was at least 100 times more luminous than any previously observed supernova, with the progenitor star being estimated 150 times more massive than the Sun. Although this had some characteristics of a Type Ia supernova, Hydrogen was found in the spectrum. It is thought that SN 2006gy is a likely candidate for a pair-instability supernova. SN 2005ap, which was discovered by Robert Quimby who also discovered SN 2006gy, was about twice as bright as SN 2006gy and about 300 times as bright as a normal type II supernova.

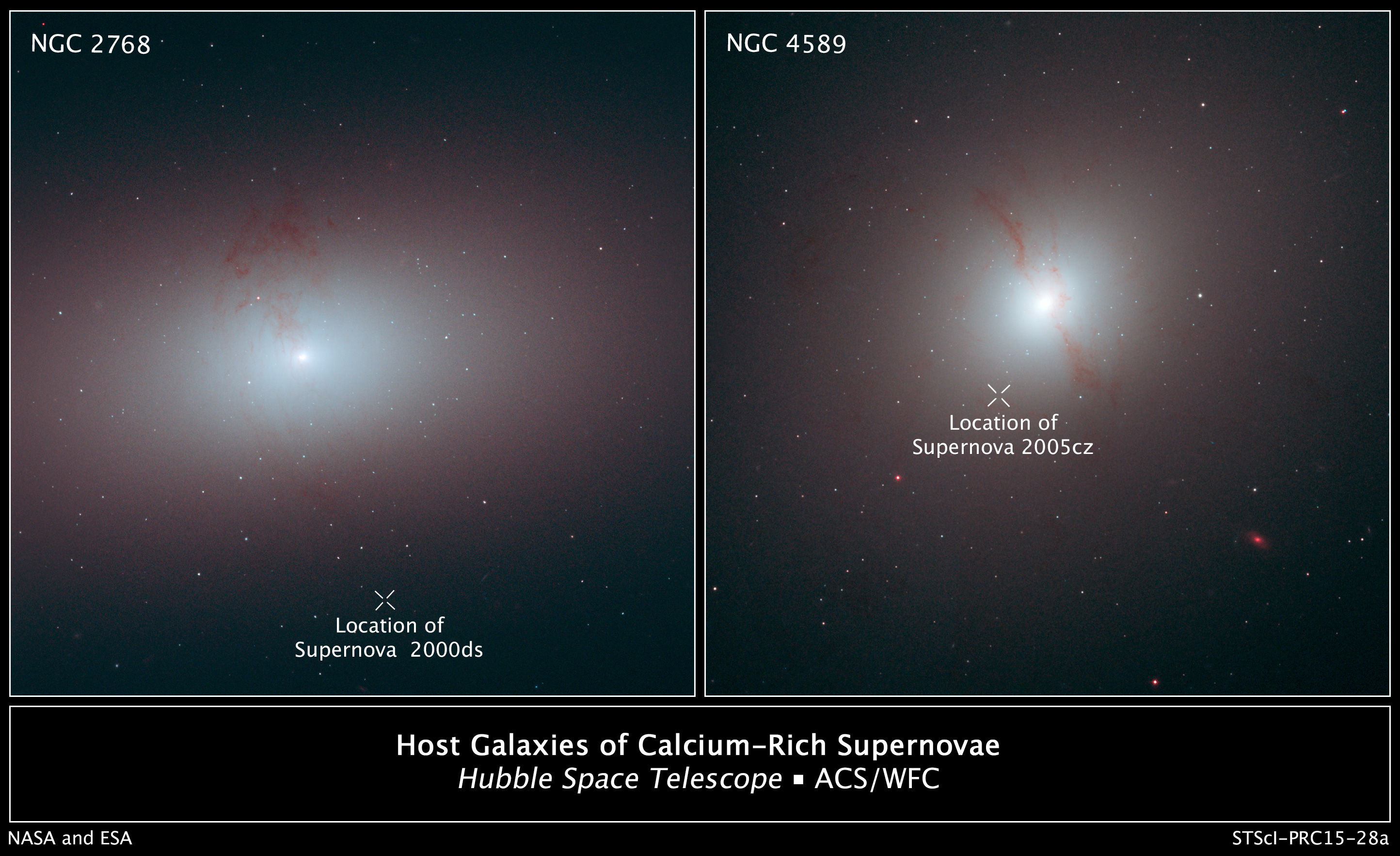
Host Galaxies of Calcium-Rich Supernovae.

On May 21, 2008, astronomers announced that they had for the first time caught a supernova on camera just as it was exploding. By chance, a burst of X-rays was noticed while looking at galaxy NGC 2770, 88 million light-years from Earth, and a variety of telescopes were aimed in that direction just in time to capture what has been named SN 2008D. "This eventually confirmed that the big X-ray blast marked the birth of a supernova," said Alicia Soderberg of Princeton University.

One of the many amateur astronomers looking for supernovae, Caroline Moore, a member of the Puckett Observatory Supernova Search Team, found supernova SN 2008ha late November 2008. At the age of 14 she had been declared the youngest person ever to find a supernova. However, in January 2011, 10-year-old Kathryn Aurora Gray from Canada was reported to have discovered a supernova, making her the youngest ever to find a supernova. Gray, her father, and a friend spotted SN 2010lt, a magnitude 17 supernova in galaxy UGC 3378 in the constellation Camelopardalis, about 240 million light years away.

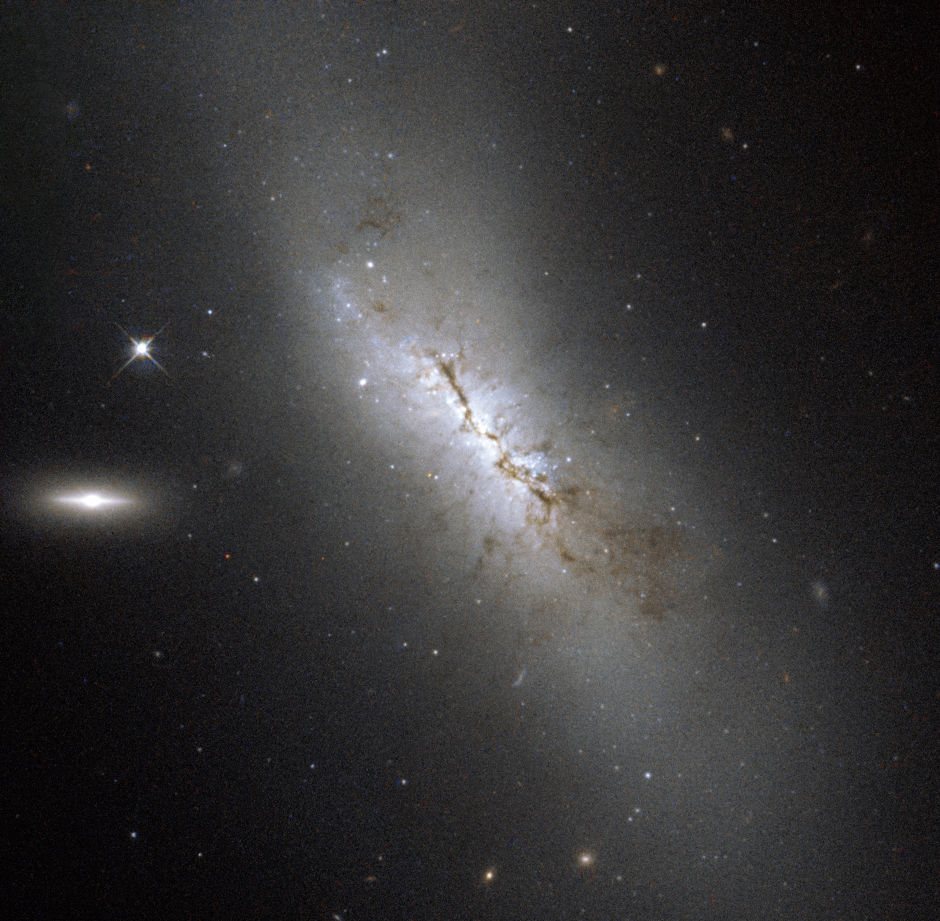
Supernova SN 2012cg in spiral galaxy NGC 4424.

In 2009, researchers have found nitrates in ice cores from Antarctica at depths corresponding to the known supernovae of 1006 and 1054 AD, as well as from around 1060 AD. The nitrates were apparently formed from nitrogen oxides created by gamma rays from the supernovae. This technique should be able to detect supernovae going back several thousand years.

On November 15, 2010, astronomers using NASA's Chandra X-ray Observatory announced that, while viewing the remnant of SN 1979C in the galaxy Messier 100, they have discovered an object which could be a young, 30-year-old black hole. NASA also noted the possibility this object could be a spinning neutron star producing a wind of high energy particles.

On August 24, 2011, the Palomar Transient Factory automated survey discovered a new Type Ia supernova (SN 2011fe) in the Pinwheel Galaxy (M101) shortly after it burst into existence. Being only 21 million lightyears away and detected so early after the event started, it will allow scientists to learn more about the early developments of these types of supernovae.

On March 16, 2012, a Type II supernova, designated as SN 2012aw, was discovered in M95.

On January 22, 2014, students at the University of London Observatory spotted an exploding star SN 2014J in the nearby galaxy M82 (the Cigar Galaxy). At a distance of around 12 million light years, the supernova is one of the nearest to be observed in recent decades.

A few weeks after a star exploded in the spiral galaxy NGC 2525 during the month of January 2018, NASA's Hubble Space Telescope took consecutive photos for nearly a year of the resulting Type Ia supernova, designated as SN 2018gv.

== Future ==
The estimated rate of supernova production in a galaxy the size of the Milky Way is about twice per century. This is much higher than the actual observed rate, implying that a portion of these events have been obscured from the Earth by interstellar dust. The deployment of new instruments that can observe across a wide range of the electromagnetic spectrum, along with neutrino detectors, means that the next such event will almost certainly be detected.

The Vera C. Rubin Observatory in Chile is predicted to discover three to four million supernovae during its ten-year survey, over a broad range of distances.

== See also ==
- List of supernovae
- History of astronomy
