= X-ray transient =

Transient x-ray binary system

X-ray emission occurs from many celestial objects. These emissions can have a pattern, occur intermittently, or as a transient astronomical event. In X-ray astronomy many sources have been discovered by placing an X-ray detector above the Earth's atmosphere. Often, the first X-ray source discovered in many constellations is an X-ray transient. These objects show changing levels of X-ray emission. NRL astronomer Dr. Joseph Lazio stated: " ... the sky is known to be full of transient objects emitting at X- and gamma-ray wavelengths, ...". There are a growing number of recurrent X-ray transients. In the sense of traveling as a transient, the only stellar X-ray source that does not belong to a constellation is the Sun. As seen from Earth, the Sun moves from west to east along the ecliptic, passing over the course of one year through the twelve constellations of the Zodiac, and Ophiuchus.

== Exotic X-ray transients ==
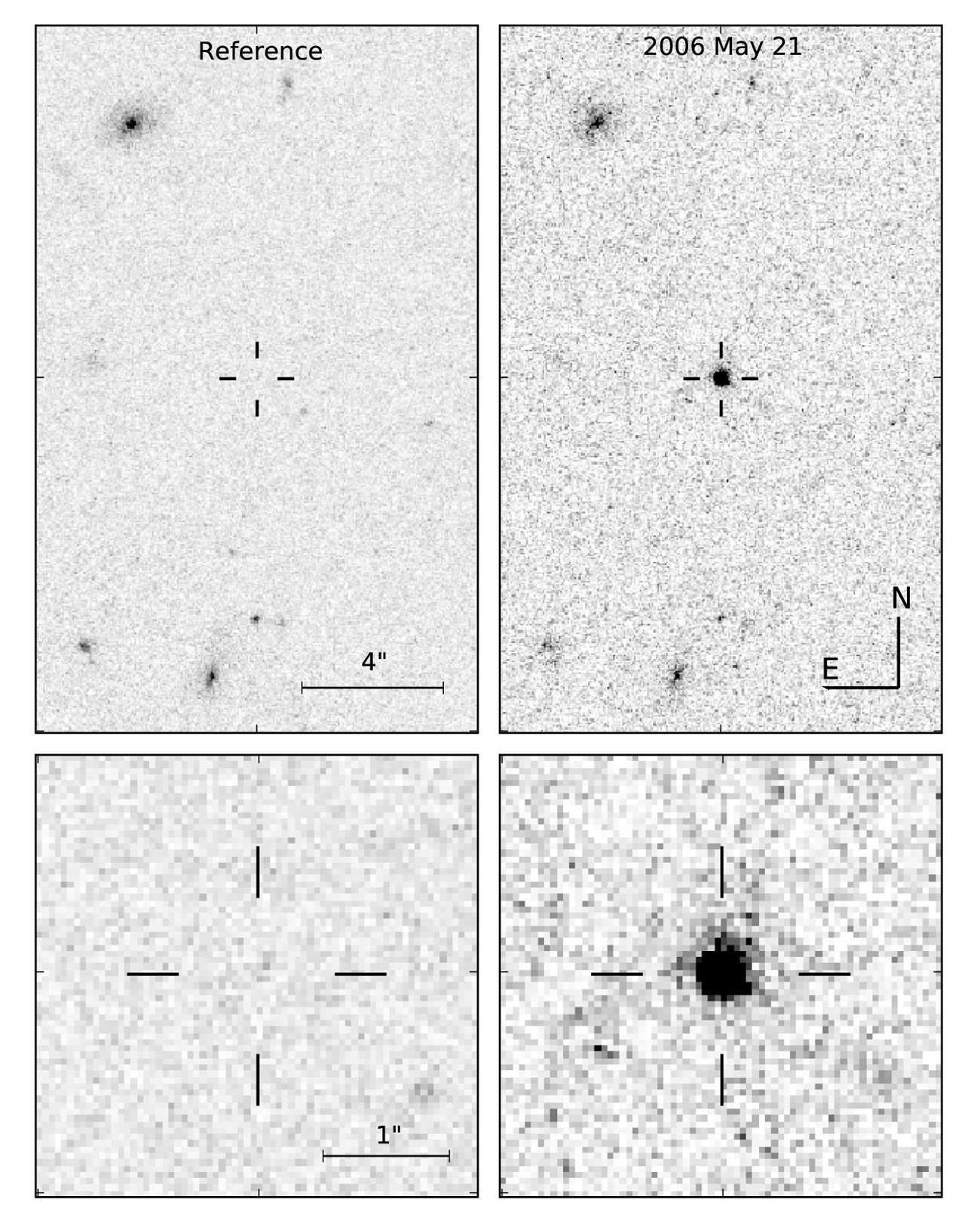
The sudden appearance of the transient "mystery object" SCP 06F6 in Hubble's field of view. The lower image quadrant represents a zoomed in view.

SCP 06F6 is (or was) an astronomical object of unknown type, discovered on February 21, 2006, in the constellation Boötes during a survey of galaxy cluster CL 1432.5+3332.8 with the Hubble Space Telescope's Advanced Camera for Surveys Wide Field Channel.

The European X-ray satellite XMM Newton made an observation in early August 2006 which appears to show an X-ray glow around SCP 06F6, two orders of magnitude more luminous than that of supernovae.

== Nova or supernova ==
Most astronomical X-ray transient sources have simple and consistent time structures; typically a rapid brightening followed by gradual fading, as in a nova or supernova.

GRO J0422+32 is an X-ray nova and black hole candidate that was discovered by the BATSE instrument on the Compton Gamma Ray Observatory satellite on Aug 5 1992. During the outburst, it was observed to be stronger than the Crab Nebula gamma-ray source out to photon energies of about 500 keV.

== Transient binary X-ray source ==
XTE J1650-500 is a transient binary X-ray source located in the constellation Ara. The binary period is 0.32 d.

== Soft X-ray transient ==
"Soft X-ray transients" are composed of some type of compact object (probably a neutron star) and some type of "normal", low-mass star (i.e. a star with a mass of some fraction of the Sun's mass). These objects show changing levels of low-energy, or "soft", X-ray emission, probably produced somehow by variable transfer of mass from the normal star to the compact object. In effect the compact object "gobbles up" the normal star, and the X-ray emission can provide the best view of how this process occurs.

Soft X-ray transients Cen X-4 and Apl X-1 were discovered by Hakucho, Japan's first X-ray astronomy satellite.

== X-ray burster ==
X-ray bursters are one class of X-ray binary stars exhibiting periodic and rapid increases in luminosity (typically a factor of 10 or greater) peaked in the X-ray regime of the electromagnetic spectrum. These astrophysical systems are composed of an accreting compact object, typically a neutron star or occasionally a black hole, and a companion 'donor' star; the mass of the donor star is used to categorize the system as either a high mass (above 10 solar masses) or low mass (less than 1 solar mass) X-ray binary, abbreviated as LMXB and HMXB, respectively. X-ray bursters differ observationally from other X-ray transient sources (such as X-ray pulsars and soft X-ray transients), showing a sharp rise time (1 – 10 seconds) followed by spectral softening (a property of cooling black bodies). Individual bursts are characterized by an integrated flux of 10^{39-40} ergs.

== Gamma-ray burster ==
A gamma-ray burst (GRB) is a highly luminous flash of gamma rays — the most energetic form of electromagnetic radiation. GRB 970228 was a GRB detected on Feb 28 1997 at 02:58 UTC. Prior to this event, GRBs had only been observed at gamma wavelengths. For several years physicists had expected these bursts to be followed by a longer-lived afterglow at longer wavelengths, such as radio waves, x-rays, and even visible light. This was the first burst for which such an afterglow was observed.

A transient x-ray source was detected which faded with a power law slope in the days following the burst. This x-ray afterglow was the first GRB afterglow ever detected.

== Transient X-ray pulsars ==
For some types of X-ray pulsars, the companion star is a Be star that rotates very rapidly and apparently sheds a disk of gas around its equator. The orbits of the neutron star with these companions are usually large and very elliptical in shape. When the neutron star passes nearby or through the Be circumstellar disk, it will capture material and temporarily become an X-ray pulsar. The circumstellar disk around the Be star expands and contracts for unknown reasons, so these are transient X-ray pulsars that are observed only intermittently, often with months to years between episodes of observable X-ray pulsation.

SAX J1808.4-3658 is a transient, accreting millisecond X-ray pulsar that is intermittent. In addition, X-ray burst oscillations and quasi-periodic oscillations in addition to coherent X-ray pulsations have been seen from SAX J1808.4-3658, making it a Rosetta stone for interpretation of the timing behavior of low-mass X-ray binaries.

== Supergiant Fast X-ray Transients (SFXTs) ==
There are a growing number of recurrent X-ray transients, characterized by short outbursts with very fast rise times (~ tens of minutes) and typical durations of a few hours that are associated with OB supergiants and hence define a new class of massive X-ray binaries: Supergiant Fast X-ray Transients (SFXTs). XTE J1739–302 is one of these. Discovered in 1997, remaining active only one day, with an X-ray spectrum well fitted with a thermal bremsstrahlung (temperature of ~20 keV), resembling the spectral properties of accreting pulsars, it was at first classified as a peculiar Be/X-ray transient with an unusually short outburst. A new burst was observed on Apr 8 2008 with Swift.

== The Sun as an X-ray transient ==
The quiet Sun, although less active than active regions, is awash with dynamic processes and transient events (bright points, nanoflares and jets).

A coronal mass ejection (CME) is an ejected plasma consisting primarily of electrons and protons (in addition to small quantities of heavier elements such as helium, oxygen, and iron), plus the entraining coronal closed magnetic field regions. Small-scale energetic signatures such as plasma heating (observed as compact soft X-ray brightening) may be indicative of impending CMEs. The soft X-ray sigmoid (an S-shaped intensity of soft X-rays) is an observational manifestation of the connection between coronal structure and CME production.

The first detection of a Coronal mass ejection (CME) as such was made on Dec 1 1971 by R. Tousey of the US Naval Research Laboratory using the 7th Orbiting Solar Observatory (OSO 7). Earlier observations of coronal transients or even phenomena observed visually during solar eclipses are now understood as essentially the same thing.

The largest geomagnetic perturbation, resulting presumably from a "prehistoric" CME, coincided with the first-observed solar flare, in 1859. The flare was observed visually by Richard Christopher Carrington and the geomagnetic storm was observed with the recording magnetograph at Kew Gardens. The same instrument recorded a crotchet, an instantaneous perturbation of the Earth's ionosphere by ionizing soft X-rays. This could not easily be understood at the time because it predated the discovery of X-rays (by Roentgen) and the recognition of the ionosphere (by Kennelly and Heaviside).

== Transient X-rays from Jupiter ==
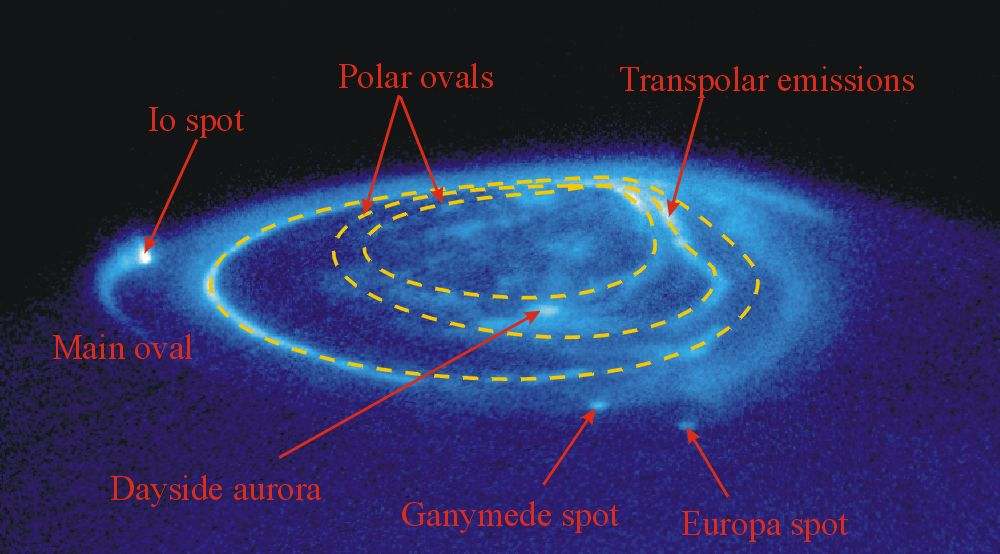
Image of Jupiter's northern aurorae, showing the main auroral oval, the polar emissions, and the spots generated by the interaction with Jupiter's natural satellites

Unlike Earth's aurorae, which are transient and only occur at times of heightened solar activity, Jupiter's aurorae are permanent, though their intensity varies from day to day. They consist of three main components: the main ovals, which are bright, narrow (< 1000 km in width) circular features located at approximately 16° from the magnetic poles; the satellite auroral spots, which correspond to the footprints of the magnetic field lines connecting their ionospheres with the ionosphere of Jupiter, and transient polar emissions situated within the main ovals. The auroral emissions were detected in almost all parts of the electromagnetic spectrum from radio waves to X-rays (up to 3 keV).

== Detecting X-ray transients ==
The X-ray monitor of Solwind, designated NRL-608 or XMON, was a collaboration between the Naval Research Laboratory and Los Alamos National Laboratory. The monitor consisted of 2 collimated argon proportional counters. The instrument bandwidth of 3-10 keV was defined by the detector window absorption (the window was 0.254 mm beryllium) and the upper level discriminator. The active gas volume (P-10 mixture) was 2.54 cm deep, providing good efficiency up to 10 keV. Counts were recorded in 2 energy channels. Slat collimators defined a FOV of 3° x 30° (FWHM) for each detector; the long axes of the FOVs were perpendicular to each other. The long axes were inclined 45 degrees to the scan direction, allowing localization of transient events to about 1 degree.

The PHEBUS experiment recorded high energy transient events in the range 100 keV to 100 MeV. It consisted of two independent detectors and their associated electronics. Each detector consisted of a bismuth germinate (BGO) crystal 78 mm in diameter by 120 mm thick, surrounded by a plastic anti-coincidence jacket. The two detectors were arranged on the spacecraft so as to observe 4π steradians. The burst mode was triggered when the count rate in the 0.1 to 1.5 MeV energy range exceeded the background level by 8 σ (standard deviations) in either 0.25 or 1.0 seconds. There were 116 channels over the energy range.

Also on board the Granat International Astrophysical Observatory were four WATCH instruments that could localize bright sources in the 6 to 180 keV range to within 0.5° using a Rotation Modulation Collimator. Taken together, the instruments' three fields of view covered approximately 75% of the sky. The energy resolution was 30% FWHM at 60 keV. During quiet periods, count rates in two energy bands (6 to 15 and 15 to 180 keV) were accumulated for 4, 8, or 16 seconds, depending on onboard computer memory availability. During a burst or transient event, count rates were accumulated with a time resolution of 1 s per 36 s.

The Compton Gamma Ray Observatory (CGRO) carries the Burst and Transient Source Experiment (BATSE) which detects in the 20 keV to 8 MeV range.

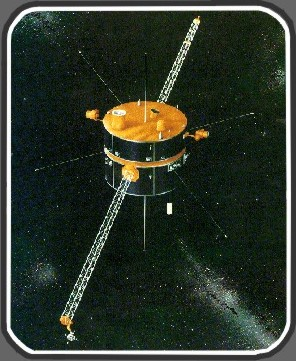
The WIND satellite is the first of NASA's Global Geospace Science (GGS)

WIND was launched on Nov 1 1994. At first, the satellite had a lunar swingby orbit around the Earth. With the assistance of the Moon's gravitational field Wind's apogee was kept over the day hemisphere of the Earth and magnetospheric observations were made. Later in the mission, the Wind spacecraft was inserted into a special "halo" orbit in the solar wind upstream from the Earth, about the sunward Sun-Earth equilibrium point (L1). The satellite has a spin period of ~ 20 seconds, with the spin axis normal to the ecliptic. WIND carries the Transient Gamma-Ray Spectrometer (TGRS) which covers the energy range 15 keV - 10 MeV, with an energy resolution of 2.0 keV @ 1.0 MeV (E/delta E = 500).

The third US Small Astronomy Satellite (SAS-3) was launched on May 7, 1975, with 3 major scientific objectives: 1) determine bright X-ray source locations to an accuracy of 15 arcseconds; 2) study selected sources over the energy range 0.1-55 keV; and 3) continuously search the sky for X-ray novae, flares, and other transient phenomena. It was a spinning satellite with pointing capability. SAS 3 was the first to discover X-rays from a highly magnetic WD binary system, AM Her, discovered X-rays from Algol and HZ 43, and surveyed the soft X-ray background (0.1-0.28 kev).

Tenma was the second Japanese X-ray astronomy satellite launched on Feb 20 1983. Tenma carried GSFC detectors which had an improved energy resolution (by a factor of 2) compared to proportional counters and performed the first sensitive measurements of the iron spectral region for many astronomical objects. Energy Range: 0.1 keV - 60 keV. Gas Scintillator Proportional Counter: 10 units of 80 cm^{2} each, FOV ~ 3deg (FWHM), 2 - 60 keV. Transient Source Monitor: 2 - 10 keV.

India's first dedicated astronomy satellite, scheduled for launch on board the PSLV in mid 2010, Astrosat will monitor the X-ray sky for new transients, among other scientific focuses.

== See also ==
- X-ray astronomy
- X-ray astrophysical sources
