= NGC 1259 =

Galaxy in the constellation Perseus

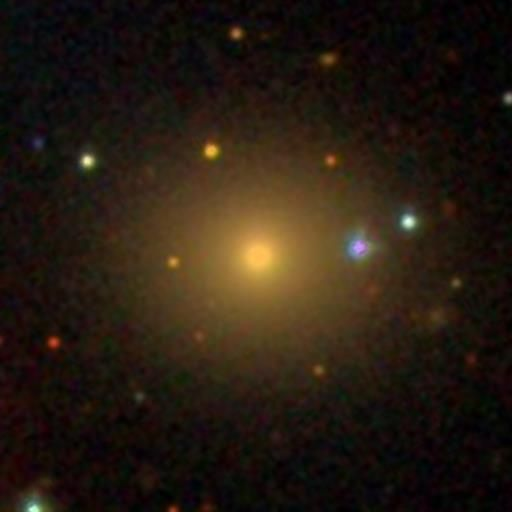
- SDSS image of NGC 1259.

Observation data (J2000 epoch)
- Constellation: Perseus
- Right ascension: 03^{h} 17^{m} 17.3^{s}
- Declination: 41° 23′ 08″
- Redshift: 0.019400
- Heliocentric radial velocity: 5816 km/s
- Distance: 243 Mly (74.4 Mpc)
- Group or cluster: Perseus Cluster
- Apparent magnitude (V): 16

Characteristics
- Type: S0
- Size: ~83,400 ly (25.58 kpc) (estimated)
- Apparent size (V): 0.7 x 0.4

Other designations
- MCG 7-7-46, PGC 12208

NGC 1259 is a lenticular galaxy located about 243 million light-years away in the constellation Perseus. The galaxy was discovered by astronomer Guillaume Bigourdan on October 21, 1884 and is a member of the Perseus Cluster.

== Supernova ==
One supernova has been observed in NGC 1259:

- SN 2008L (Type Ia, mag. 18.7) was discovered by Yasuhide Fujita on January 14, 2008.

== See also ==
- List of NGC objects (1001–2000)
- NGC 1260
