= NGC 5177 =

Lenticular galaxy in the constellation Virgo

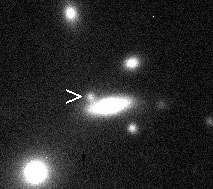
- NGC 5177 with SN 2010cr May 19, 2010

Observation data (J2000 epoch)
- Constellation: Virgo
- Right ascension: 13^{h} 29^{m} 24.2^{s}
- Declination: +11° 47′ 49″
- Redshift: 0.021570
- Heliocentric radial velocity: 6467 ± 29 km/s
- Distance: 297 Mly (Light Travel-Time) (redshift-based)
- Apparent magnitude (V): 15.1g

Characteristics
- Type: S0
- Apparent size (V): 0.81' x 0.46'

Other designations
- MCG +02-34-019, PGC 47337

NGC 5177 is a lenticular galaxy in the constellation of Virgo. Based on a redshift of 6467 km/s the galaxy is crudely estimated to be about 300 million light-years away.

On April 16, 2010 UT, the Palomar Transient Factory automated wide-field survey detected a supernova on the outskirts of NGC 5177. The supernova is known as SN 2010cr and is located at 13:29:25.11 +11:47:46.4. A confirmation spectrum was taken with the Palomar Hale Telescope on April 17 UT which showed it to be approximately 13 days before peak brightness. The Hubble Space Telescope took STIS/UV spectroscopic observations on May 3, 2010.

== Gallery ==
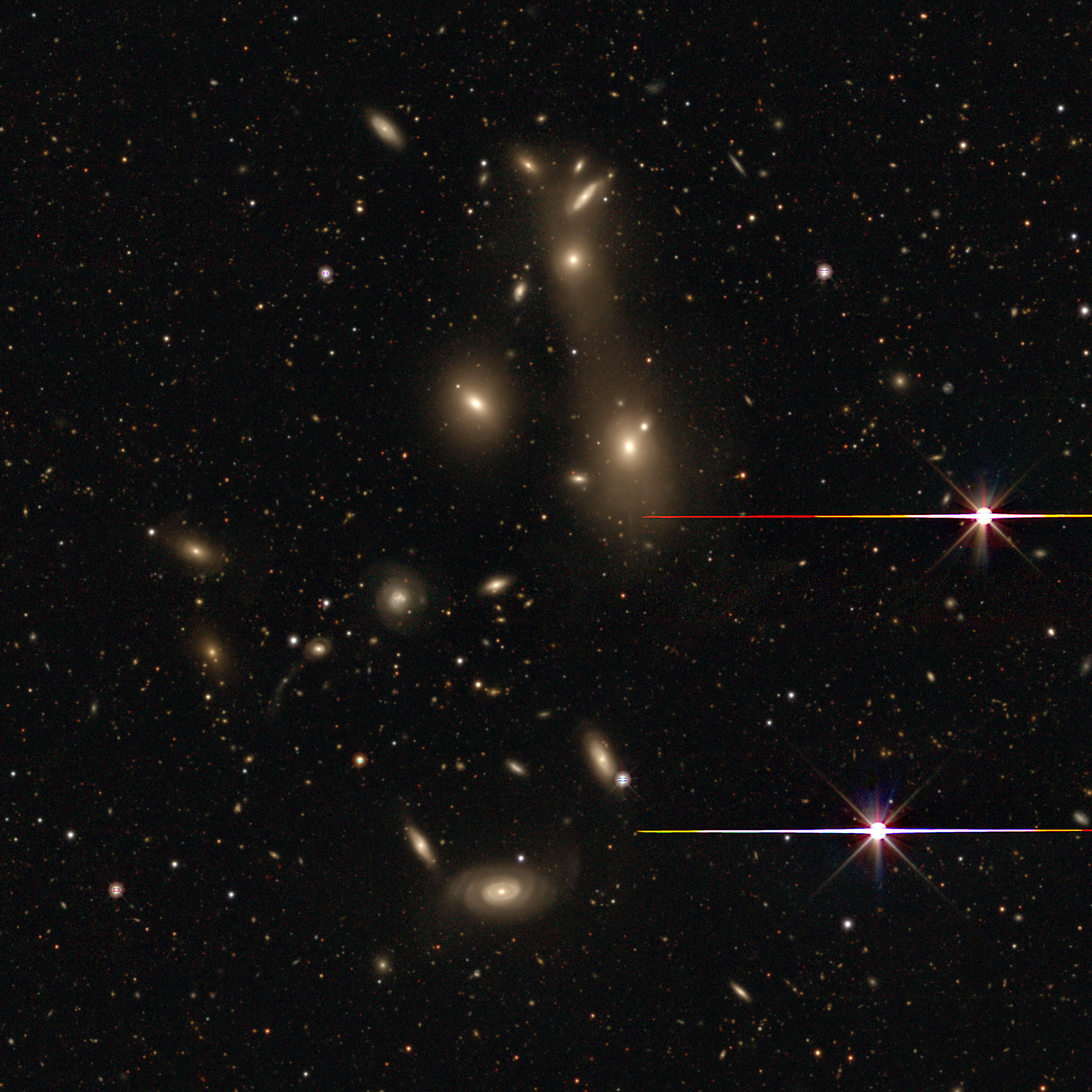
The NGC 5171 Group (legacy surveys), containing NGC 5171, NGC 5176, NGC 5177, NGC 5178 and NGC 5179

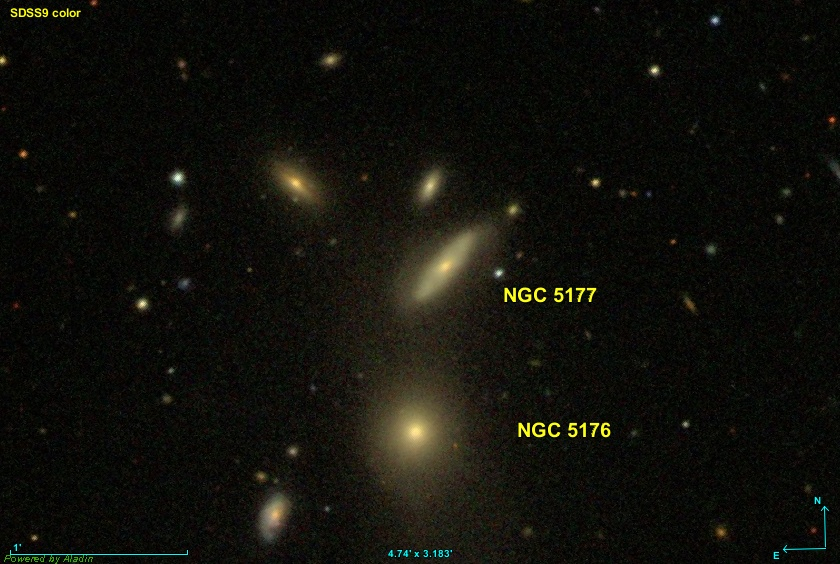
NGC 5177 with SDSS

== See also ==
- List of supernovae
- History of supernova observation
- List of supernova remnants
- List of supernova candidates
