= Texas Supernova Search =

Search for supernovae

- Target: supernova events

Texas Supernova Search (TSS) is one of many ongoing projects to identify and record supernova events. The project is led by Robert Quimby and to date has found 35 supernovae, 29 of which they were the first to report on. In addition they have discovered twelve (extragalactic) novae (in M31 and M33, including a probable LBV) and six dwarf novae.

The project's most notable successes are SN 2005ap and SN 2006gy, the two most powerful supernovae yet recorded. SN 2005ap was an extremely energetic Type II supernova. It is reported to be the brightest supernova yet recorded, twice as bright as the previous record holder, SN 2006gy. Although SN 2005ap was twice as bright at its peak than SN 2006gy it was not as energetic overall as the former brightened and dimmed in a typical period of a few days whereas the latter remained very bright for many months. SN2005ap was about 300 times brighter than normal for a Type II supernova. It has been speculated that this supernova involved the formation of a quark star.

Time magazine listed the discovery of SN 2006gy as third in its Top 10 Scientific Discoveries for 2007.
