= Quark-nova =

Hypothetical explosion of a neutron star

A quark-nova is the hypothetical violent explosion resulting from the conversion of a neutron star to a quark star. Analogous to a supernova heralding the birth of a neutron star, a quark nova signals the creation of a quark star. The term quark-nova was coined in 2002 by Rachid Ouyed (currently at the University of Calgary, Canada) and Drs. J. Dey and M. Dey (Calcutta University, India).

== The nova process ==
When a neutron star's rotation slows down, it may convert to a quark star through a process known as quark deconfinement. The resultant star would have quark matter in its interior. The process would release immense amounts of energy, perhaps explaining the most energetic explosions in the universe; calculations have estimated that as much as 10^{46} J could be released from the phase transition inside a neutron star. Quark-novae may be one cause of gamma ray bursts. According to Jaikumar and collaborators, they may also be involved in producing heavy elements such as platinum through r-process nucleosynthesis.

== Candidates ==
Rapidly spinning neutron stars with masses between 1.5 and 1.8 solar masses are hypothetically the best candidates for conversion due to spin down of the star within a Hubble time. This amounts to a small fraction of the projected neutron star population. A conservative estimate based on this, indicates that up to two quark-novae may occur in the observable universe each day.

Hypothetically, quark stars would be radio-quiet, so radio-quiet neutron stars may be quark stars.

== Observations ==
Direct evidence for quark-novae is scant; however, recent observations of supernovae SN 2006gy, SN 2005gj and SN 2005ap may point to their existence.

== See also ==
- QCD matter, also known as quark matter – Hypothetical phases of matter
- Quark-degenerate matter – Type of dense exotic matter in physics
- SN 2006gy – 2006 hypernova in constellation Perseus
- SN 2005gj – Supernova event observed on September 29, 2005
