= XTE J1650−500 =

X-ray binary star in the constellation Ara

XTE J1650-500
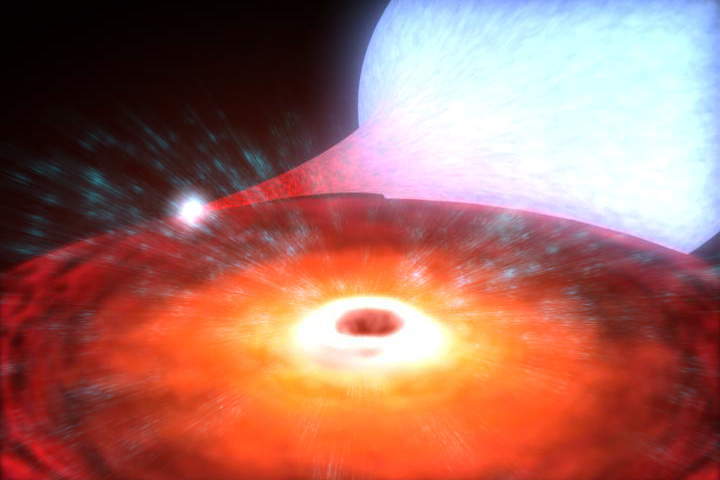
- Artist's impression of XTE J1650−500

Observation data Epoch J2000 Equinox J2000
- Constellation: Ara
- Right ascension: 16^{h} 50^{m} 00.98^{s}
- Declination: −49° 57′ 43.6″

Characteristics
- Spectral type: K2V

Astrometry
Distance	3300±700 pc

Details

Black hole
Mass	9.7±1.6 M_{☉}

Other designations
- INTREF 720

Database references
SIMBAD	data

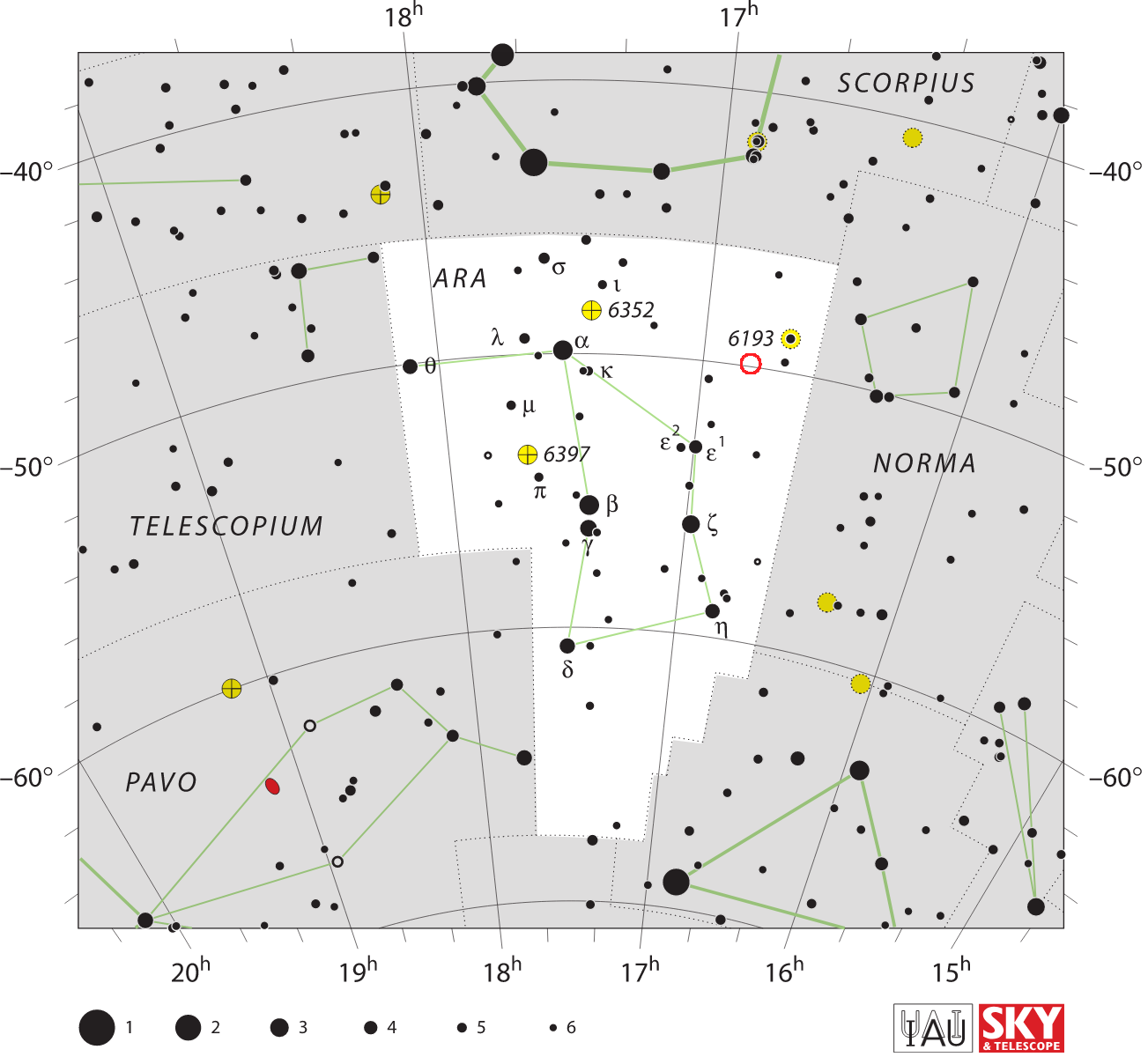
The location of XTE J1650−500 (circled in red)

XTE J1650−500 is a binary system containing a stellar-mass black hole candidate and 2000–2001 transient binary X-ray source located in the constellation Ara. In 2008, it was claimed that this black hole had a mass of 3.8±0.5 solar masses, which would have been the smallest found for any black hole; smaller than GRO 1655−40, the then known smallest of 6.3 M_{☉}. However, this claim was subsequently retracted; the more likely mass is 5–10 solar masses.

The binary period of the black hole and its companion is 0.32 days.

== See also ==
- Stellar black hole
