= SN 2005gj =

Supernova event observed on September 29, 2005

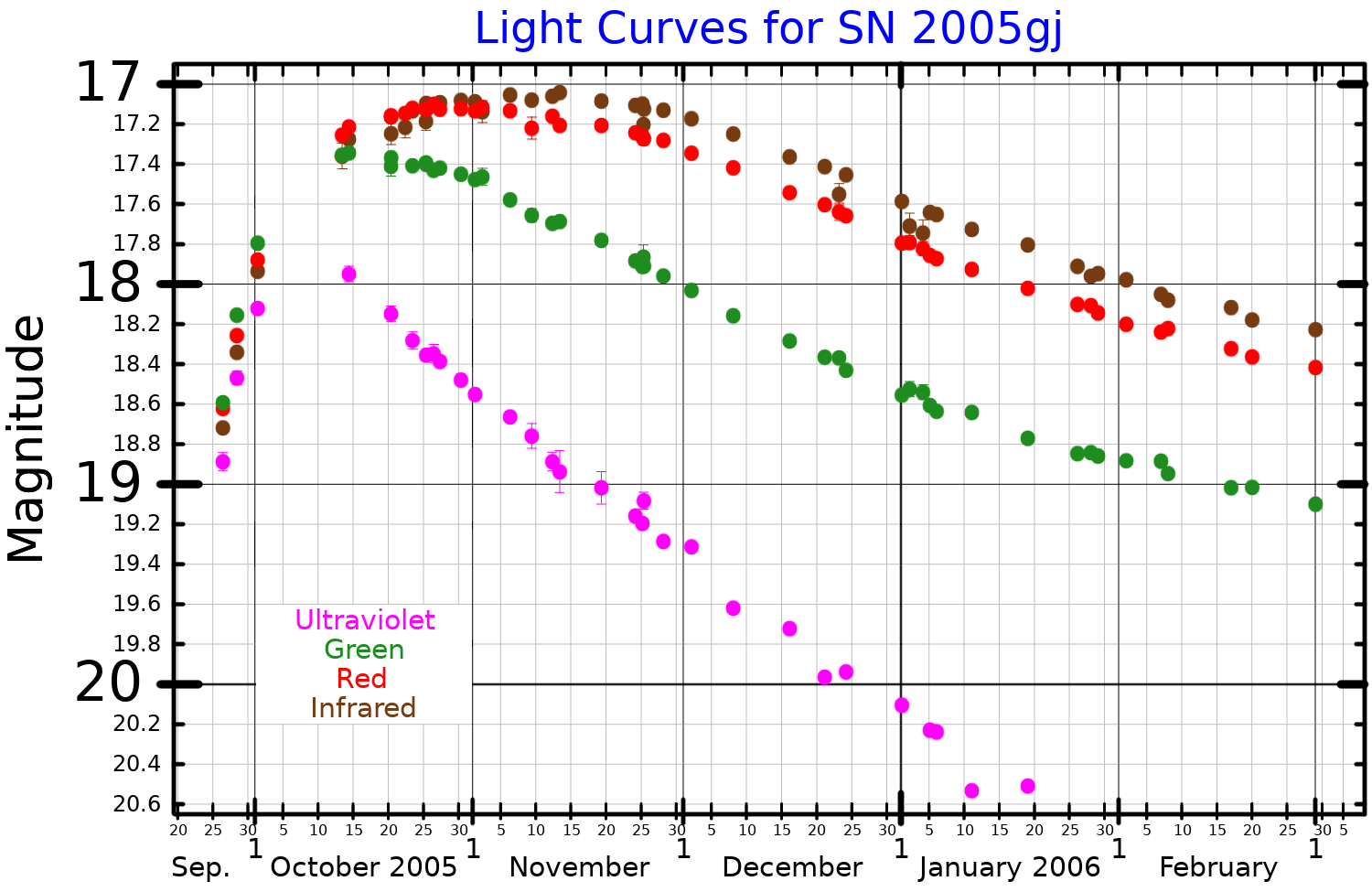
- Light curves for SN 2005gj in four photometric bands, plotted from data published by Prieto et al. (2007)
- Event type: Supernova
- Ia/IIn "hybrid"
- Discovered: September 27, 2005
- Constellation: Cetus
- Epoch: J2000.0
- Distance: 864 million light years (265 million parsecs)
- Redshift: 0.0592, 0.0595, 0.0596, 0.06, 0.0621
- Progenitor: White dwarf
- Notable features: Proposed "quark nova".
- Other designations: SN 2005gj, SDSS-II SN 4524

SN 2005gj was a supernova located approximately 864 million light years (265 million parsecs) away from Earth. It was discovered on September 27, 2005, by the Sloan Digital Sky Survey and the Nearby Supernova Factory. 2005gj was noted because it had qualities of both Type Ia and Type IIn supernovae, and because hydrogen emission lines were found in its spectrum (see hydrogen spectral series). These hydrogen lines, which were found on the spectrum at redshift z=0.0613, are thought to be indicative of interactions with a circumstellar medium (CSM; a donut-shaped, nebula-like ring of matter around a star) by the supernova's ejected matter or white dwarf progenitor. Such emission lines are extremely rare in Type Ia supernovae – only one other Type Ia, SN 2002ic, has been observed to exhibit the same properties. However, 2005gj's CSM interaction was much stronger and more clearly observed than 2002ic's. The mass-loss history 2005gj's hydrogen lines suggest has been cited as evidence that luminous blue variable (LBV) hypergiants can be progenitors of thermonuclear supernovae.

2005gj was also noted for its overluminosity. With a light curve that maximised 14–47 days after the initial observation, it was three times more luminous than SN 1991T (which was, at the time of its 1991 discovery, the brightest Ia supernova on record), 1.5 times more luminous than SN 2002ic, and close to 100 times more luminous than previously thought possible. Scientists Denis Leahy and Rachid Ouyed from the University of Calgary contend that the incidence of a quark nova, a very luminous process involving the degeneration of neutrons into their constituent quarks, could explain the unusual magnitude of the luminosity.

== See also ==
- SN 2003fg
