= SN 185 =

Possible supernova event located in Centaurus-Circinus

Supernova SN 185
- Image of SN 185 imaged by CTIO
- Event type: Supernova remnant, supernova
- Type Ia?
- Date: 7 December 185
- Constellation: Circinus or Centaurus
- Right ascension: 14^{h} 43^{m}
- Declination: −62° 30′
- Epoch: J2000
- Galactic coordinates: G315.4−2.3
- Distance: 2,800 pc (9,100 ly)
- Remnant: Shell
- Host: Milky Way
- Notable features: Ancient records of SN 185 may be the earliest written description of a supernova.
- Peak apparent magnitude: "as much as −8"
- Other designations: SN 185, SNR G315.0-02.3, SNR G315.4-02.3, 1ES 1436-62.4, 1RXS J144254.3-622815, 3FHL J1443.0-6227e, AJG 27, 3A 1438-626, GPS 1438-624, MSH 14-6-03, 2FHL J1443.2-6221e
- Preceded by: None known
- Followed by: SN 386

SN 185 (also known as RCW 86) was a transient astronomical event observed in the year AD 185, likely a supernova. The transient occurred in the direction of Alpha Centauri, between the constellations Circinus and Centaurus, centered at RA 14^{h} 43^{m} Dec −62° 30′, in Circinus. This "guest star" was observed by Chinese astronomers in the Book of Later Han (後漢書), and might have been recorded in Roman literature. It remained visible in the night sky for eight months. This is believed to be the first supernova for which records exist.

== History ==
The Book of Later Han gives the following description:

In the 2nd year of the epoch Zhongping [中平], the 10th month, on the day Guihai [癸亥] [December 7, Year 185], a 'guest star' appeared in the middle of the Southern Gate [南門] [an asterism consisting of ε Centauri and α Centauri], The size was half a bamboo mat. It displayed various colors, both pleasing and otherwise. It gradually lessened. In the 6th month of the succeeding year it disappeared.

The gaseous shell RCW 86 is probably the supernova remnant of this event and has a relatively large angular size of roughly 45 arc minutes (larger than the apparent size of the full moon, which varies from 29 to 34 arc minutes). The distance to RCW 86 is estimated to be 2,800 parsecs (9,100 light-years). Recent X-ray studies show a good match for the expected age.

Infrared observations from NASA's Spitzer Space Telescope and Wide-field Infrared Survey Explorer (WISE) reveal how the supernova occurred and how its shattered remains ultimately spread out to great distances. The findings show that the stellar explosion took place in a hollowed-out cavity, allowing material expelled by the star to travel much faster and farther than it would have otherwise.

Differing modern interpretations of the Chinese records of the guest star have led to quite different suggestions for the astronomical mechanism behind the event, from a core-collapse supernova to a distant, slow-moving comet – with correspondingly wide-ranging estimates of its apparent visual magnitude (−8 to +4). The recent Chandra results suggest that it was most likely a Type Ia supernova (a type with consistent absolute magnitude), and therefore similar to Tycho's Supernova (SN 1572), which had apparent magnitude −4 at a similar distance.

== Gallery ==
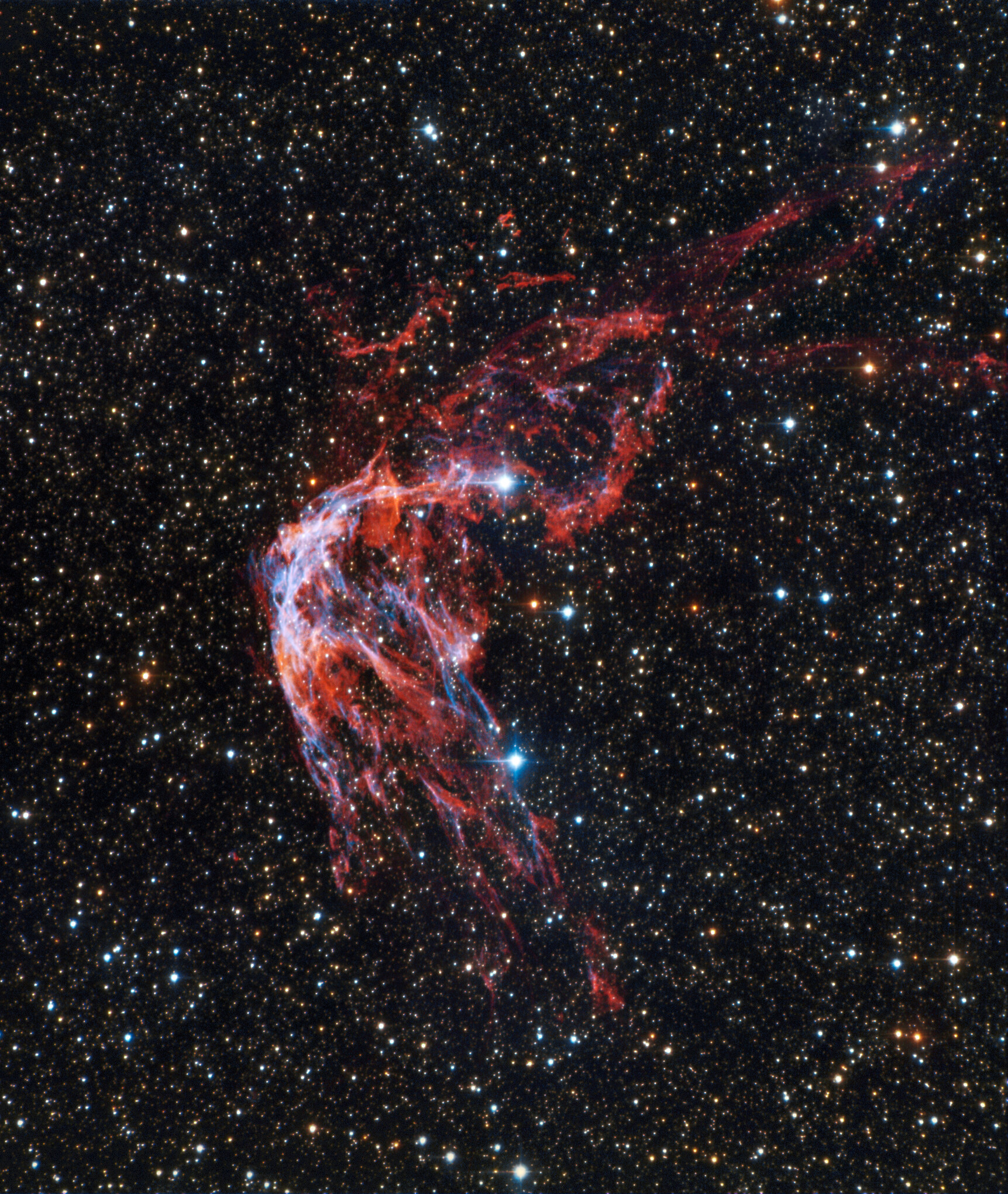
Image of the gaseous supernova remnant RCW 86, taken by the SMARTS 0.9-meter telescope at CTIO.

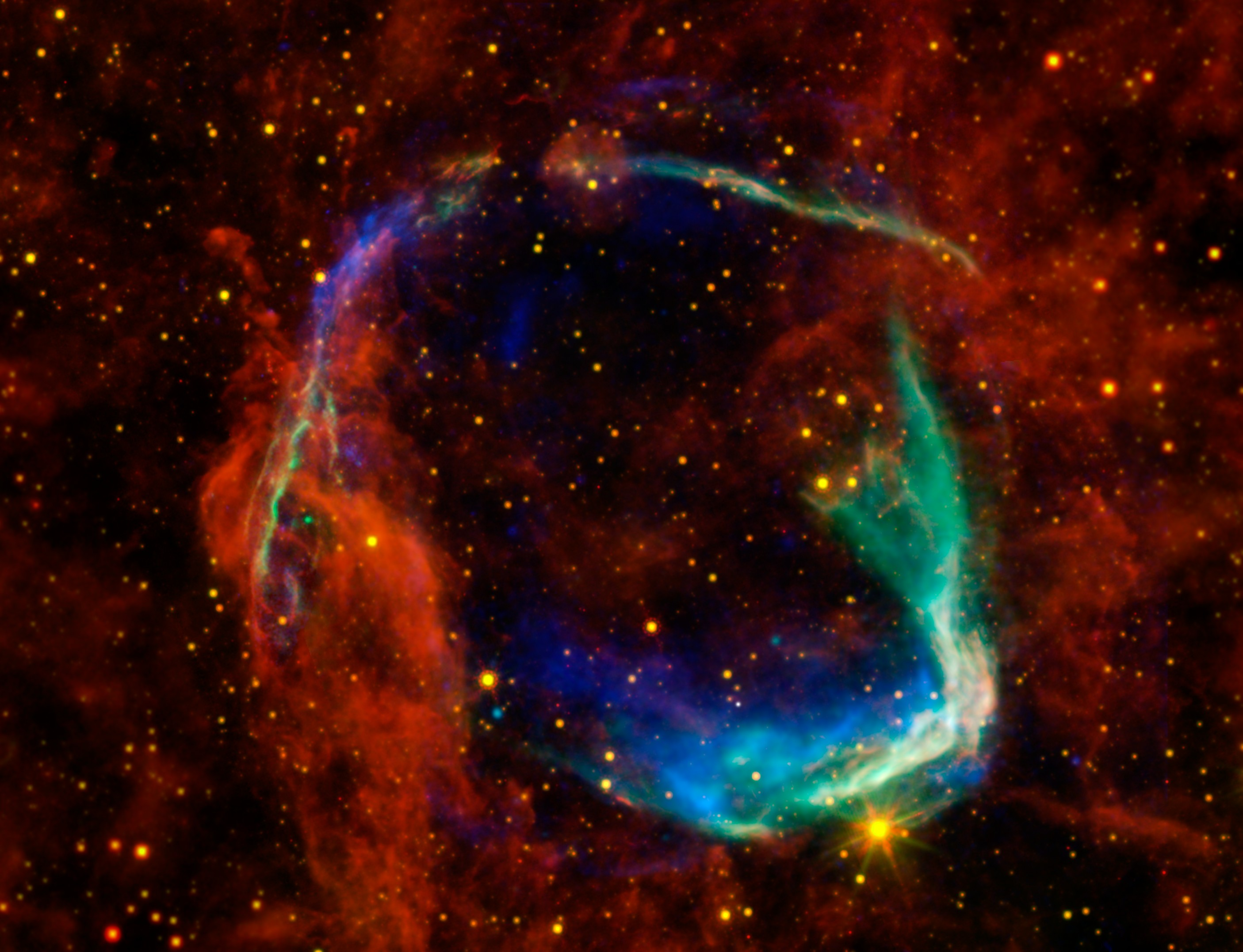
Infrared images from NASA's Spitzer Space Telescope and WISE are combined with X-ray data from the Chandra X-ray Observatory and ESA's XMM-Newton Observatory in this image of RCW 86.

== See also ==
- List of supernovae
- History of supernova observation
- List of supernova remnants
- List of supernova candidates
