= SN 386 =

Supernova in the constellation Sagittarius

Supernova SN 386
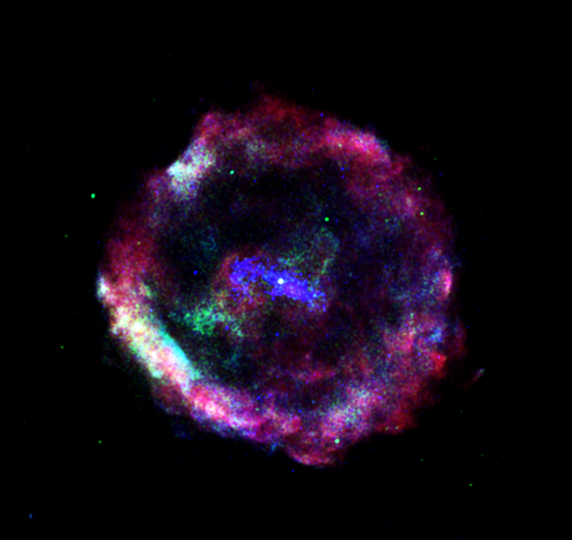
- Event type: Supernova, supernova remnant
- Type II
- Discovered: April/May 386
- Constellation: Sagittarius
- Right ascension: 18^{h} 11.5^{m}
- Declination: −19° 25′
- Distance: 14000-23000 LY
- Remnant: Shell
- Host: Milky Way
- Other designations: SN 386
- Preceded by: SN 185
- Followed by: SN 393
- Related media on Commons

SN 386 is a probable transient astronomical event in the constellation Sagittarius, which appeared as a "guest star" that was reported by Chinese astronomers in 386 CE.

== Record ==
"Emperor Xiaowu of Jin, 11th year of the Taiyuan reign period, third month. There was a guest star in Nandou [LM8] that lasted until the 6th month (Jul 13 to Aug 10), when it disappeared" (Jin shu, Tianwen zhi, ch. 13; Song shu, Tianwen zhi, ch. 25 according to Xu, Pankenier, Jiang 2000).

Nandou, the Southern Dipper, is part of the constellation of Sagittarius. The only historical information is: Something flared up there and was visible for ~3 months. As this asterism is in or close to the bulge of the Milky Way, the object should have been bright (at least 2 mag) to be recognized against bright background of the clouds of the Milky Way.

== Suggested as supernova ==
Due to the given duration of the appearance, this record was suggested to report a supernova. Since 1976 several SNR in the relatively crowded field have been suggested as counterpart:

Suggested SNR counterparts for 386
| Designation | Source | Comments |
|---|---|---|
| G011.2–01.1 | Stephenson & Green (2002), p. 182 | First guess from radio data (see below) |
| G011.2–00.3 | Stephenson & Green (2002), p. 182 | |
| G007.7–03.7 | Zhou et al. (2018) | Possible after X-ray observations |
| G008.7–05.0 | | Also small and at appropriate position |

These remnants are valid suggestions but the supernova is supposed to be a "low luminosity SN" because it lasted only for three months. Thus, a classical nova would also be possible.

== Suggested as classical nova ==
The decline time of classical novae is measured typically as the duration of decline by 3 mag from peak. This so-called t_{3} time ranges from typical 25–30 days (a month or two) for fast novae up to ten months for the slowest known classical novae (and even longer for diffusion induced novae). Thus, this historical transient could easily have been caused by a (fast or moderately fast) classical nova: postulating a peak brightness of (at least) 2 mag for the historical sighting and vanishing to invisibility (>5 mag) within 3 months, it could be a moderately fast nova. The brighter the peak, the faster the nova: if the peak was −1 mag (like Sirius) or −4 (like Venus) and declined to >5 mag within three months (6 mag or more in three months) it likely refers to a really fast nova. Possible (and certainly not the only) candidates in the Chinese constellation of Nandou are according to:

Suggested classical nova counterparts for 386
| Designation | Comments |
|---|---|
| V1223 Sgr | Intermediate polar |
| V3890 Sgr | Known recurrent nova |
| Four further symbiotic binaries | |

== Supernova remnant: SNR G11.2-0.3 ==
Although SN 386 was generally considered to be associated with the symmetrically 4 arcmin circular shell of a supernova remnant, SNR G11.2-0.3, this theory is now thought not to be true. Its stellar progenitor was likely a Supernova Type II event. Recent studies give the more precise type as core-collapsed Type cIIb/Ibc.

A measured mean expansion rate of this remnant shell is 0.0277±0.0180% per year, whose true diameter is now about 3.0 pc (9.8 ly), suggesting its age is 1900±500 years. Quoted distances estimated SNR G11.2–0.3 to be about 4,900 pc (16,000 ly) away from Earth, but more recent radio observation now range between 4,400–7,000 pc (14,000–23,000 ly).

Rejection of SNR G11.2–0.3's association with SN 386 is by the significant very high absorption of light (A_{V}) between the source and Earth, which is estimated from infrared observations as about 16 magnitudes. This suggests the star would not have been visible to the naked-eye.

== Pulsar: PSR J1811-1926 ==
At the centre of G11.2–0.3 is a fast rotating 65 ms neutron star observed in radio frequencies as pulsar PSR J1811-1926 or as X-ray source AX J1811-1926, which has also generated a small inner 10 to 15 arcsec pulsar wind nebula (PWN). This pulsar and its surrounding debris field was observed by the Chandra X-ray Observatory, when it was suggested SN 386 could have been created around the same time as the Chinese observations, but more modern observed measured rotational velocities, spin down rate, and radio observations of PSR J1811-1926, indicate a much older 20,000 to 23,000 years. If true, this clearly discounts the conclusion that the pulsar is associated with SN 386. The clear contradiction comparing this with the age determined by the expansion rate of the supernova remnant seems yet to be ascertained.

The distance of the pulsar was estimated in 2003 as 5,000 pc (16,000 ly).
