= SN 2006gy =

2006 hypernova in constellation Perseus

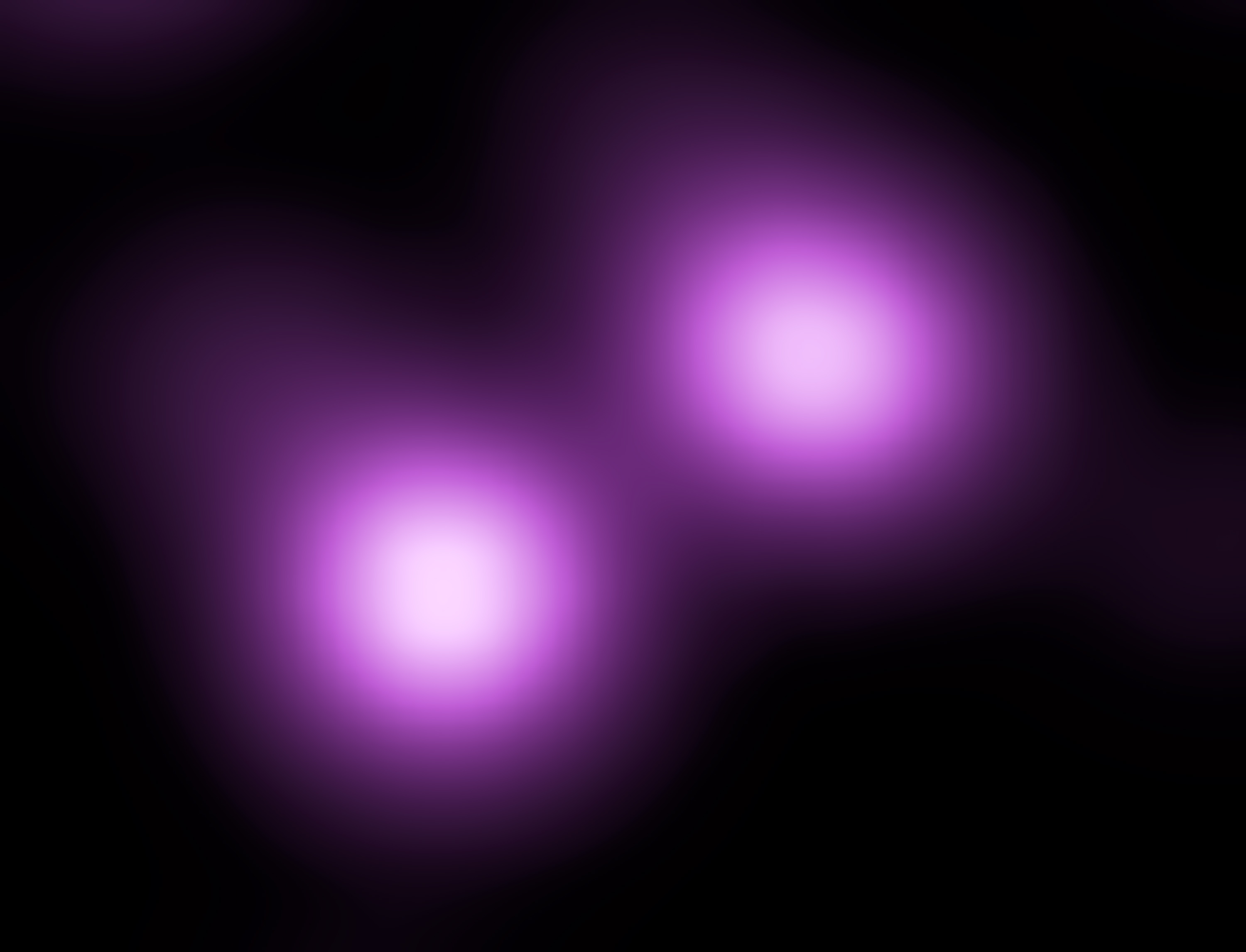
- SN 2006gy and the core of its home galaxy, NGC 1260, viewed in x-ray light from the Chandra X-ray Observatory. The NGC 1260 galactic core is on the lower left and SN 2006gy is on the upper right.
- Event type: Hypernova
- IIn
- Date: c. 238 million years ago (discovered 18 September 2006 by Robert Quimby and P. Mondol)
- Constellation: Perseus
- Right ascension: 03^{h} 17^{m} 27.10^{s}
- Declination: +41° 24′ 19.50″
- Epoch: J2000
- Galactic coordinates: 150.2568 -13.5916
- Distance: c. 238 million ly
- Host: NGC 1260
- Progenitor: Hypergiant
- Notable features: is located 2.0" W and 0.4" N of the center of NGC 1260
- Peak apparent magnitude: +14.2
- Other designations: SN 2006gy
- Related media on Commons

SN 2006gy was an extremely energetic supernova, also referred to as a hypernova, that was discovered on September 18, 2006. It was first observed by Robert Quimby and P. Mondol, and then studied by several teams of astronomers using facilities that included the Chandra, Lick, and Keck Observatories. In May 2007, NASA and several of the astronomers announced the first detailed analyses of the supernova, describing it as the "brightest stellar explosion ever recorded". In October 2007, Quimby announced that SN 2005ap had broken SN 2006gy's record as the brightest-ever recorded supernova, and several subsequent discoveries are brighter still. Time magazine listed the discovery of SN 2006gy as third in its Top 10 Scientific Discoveries for 2007.

== Characteristics ==
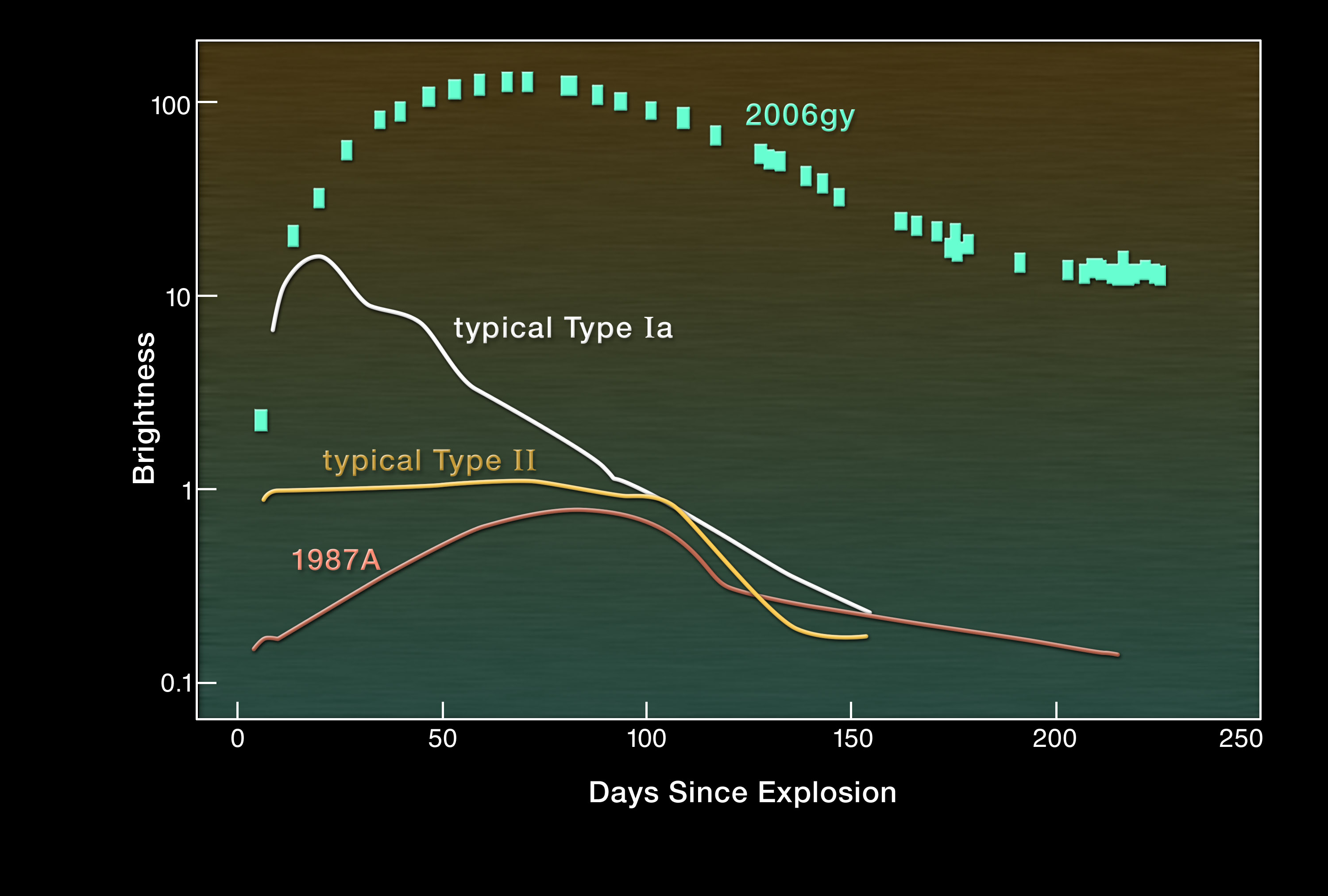
Light curve of SN 2006gy (uppermost intermittent squares) compared with other types of supernovae

SN 2006gy occurred in the galaxy NGC 1260, approximately 238 million light-years (73 megaparsecs) away. The energy radiated by the explosion has been estimated at 10^{51} ergs (10^{44} J), making it a hundred times more powerful than the typical supernova explosion which radiates 10^{49} ergs (10^{42} J) of energy. Although at its peak the SN 2006gy supernova was intrinsically 400 times as luminous as SN 1987A, which was bright enough to be seen by the naked eye, SN 2006gy was more than 1,400 times as far away as SN 1987A, and thus too far away to be seen without a telescope.

SN 2006gy is classified as a Type II supernova because it showed lines of hydrogen in its spectrum, although the extreme brightness indicates that it is different from the typical Type II supernova. Several possible mechanisms have been proposed for such a violent explosion. One promising explanation involves the efficient conversion of explosive kinetic energy to radiation by interaction with a massive circumstellar shell, similar to a Type IIn supernova but on a larger scale. Such a scenario might occur following mass loss of 10 or more M_{☉} in a luminous blue variable eruption, through pulsational pair instability ejections, or a common envelope event. Denis Leahy and Rachid Ouyed, Canadian scientists from the University of Calgary, have proposed that SN 2006gy was a quark-nova, heralding the birth of a quark star.

== Similarity to Eta Carinae ==
Eta Carinae (η Carinae or η Car) is a highly luminous hypergiant star located approximately 7,500 light-years from Earth in the Milky Way galaxy. Since Eta Carinae is 32,000 times closer than SN 2006gy, the light from it will be about a billion-fold brighter. It is estimated to be similar in size to the star which became SN 2006gy. Dave Pooley, one of the discoverers of SN 2006gy, says that if Eta Carinae exploded in a similar fashion, it would be bright enough that one could read by its light on Earth at night, and would even be visible during the daytime. SN 2006gy's apparent magnitude (m) was 15, so a similar event at Eta Carinae will have an m of about −7.5. According to astrophysicist Mario Livio, this could happen at any time, but the risk to life on Earth would be low.

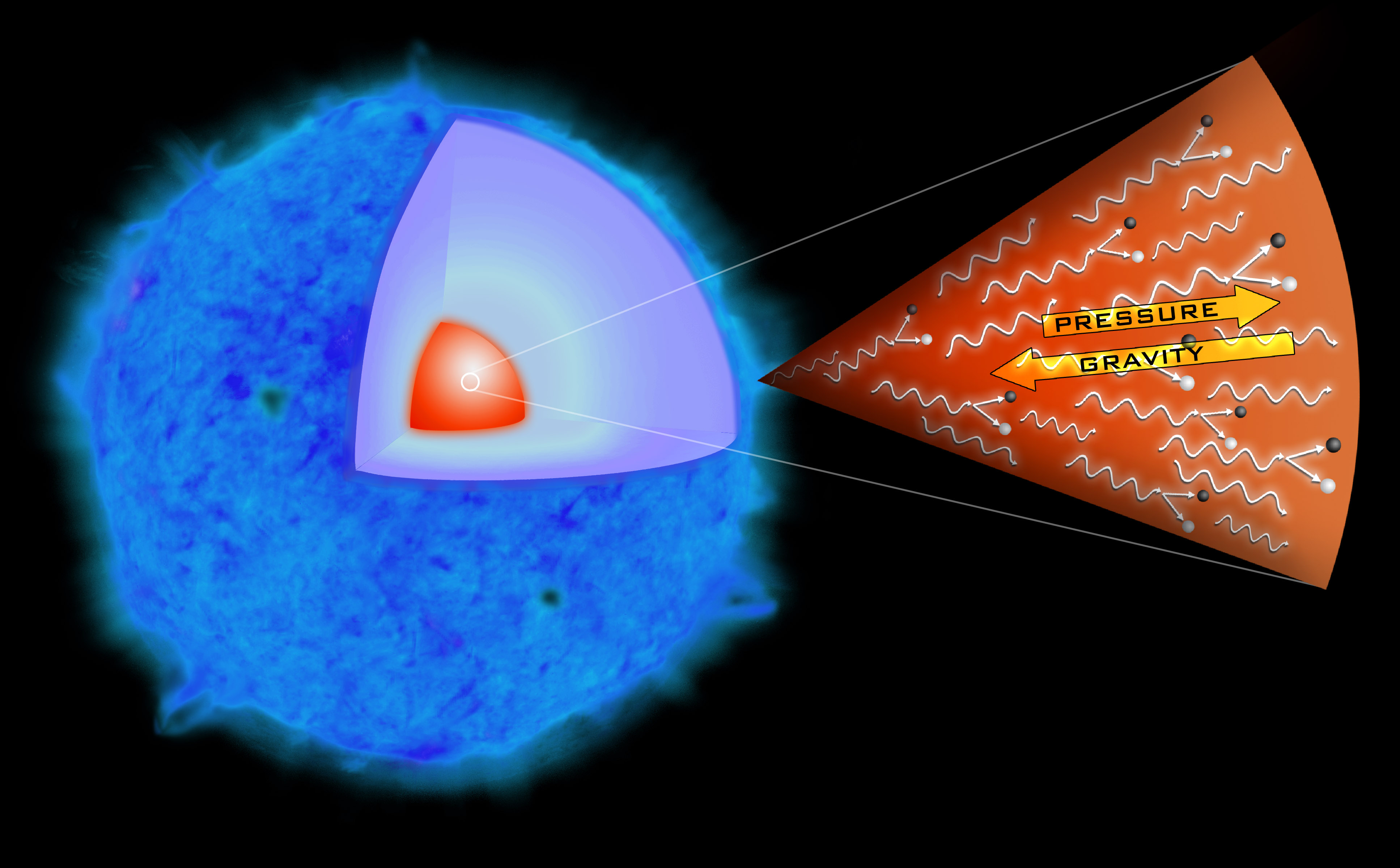
This diagram illustrates the pair-instability process that astronomers think triggered the explosion in SN 2006gy. A sufficiently massive star can produce gamma rays of such high energy that some of the photons convert into pairs of electrons and positrons causing a runaway reaction which destroys the star.

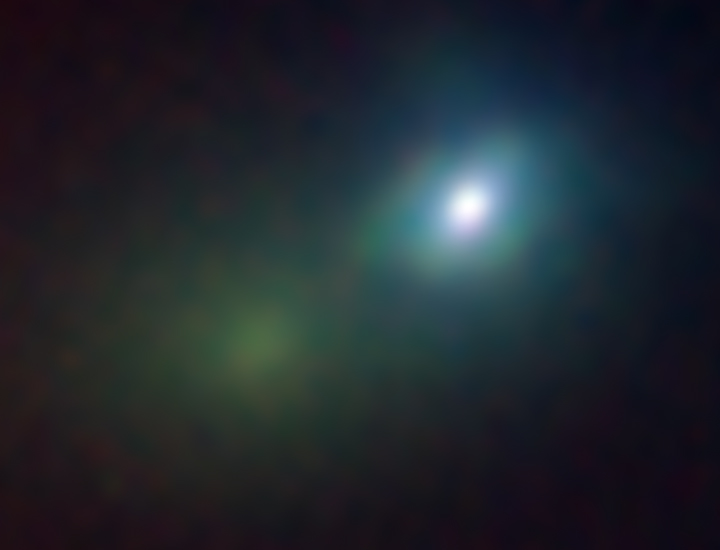
SN2006gy (top right) in infrared

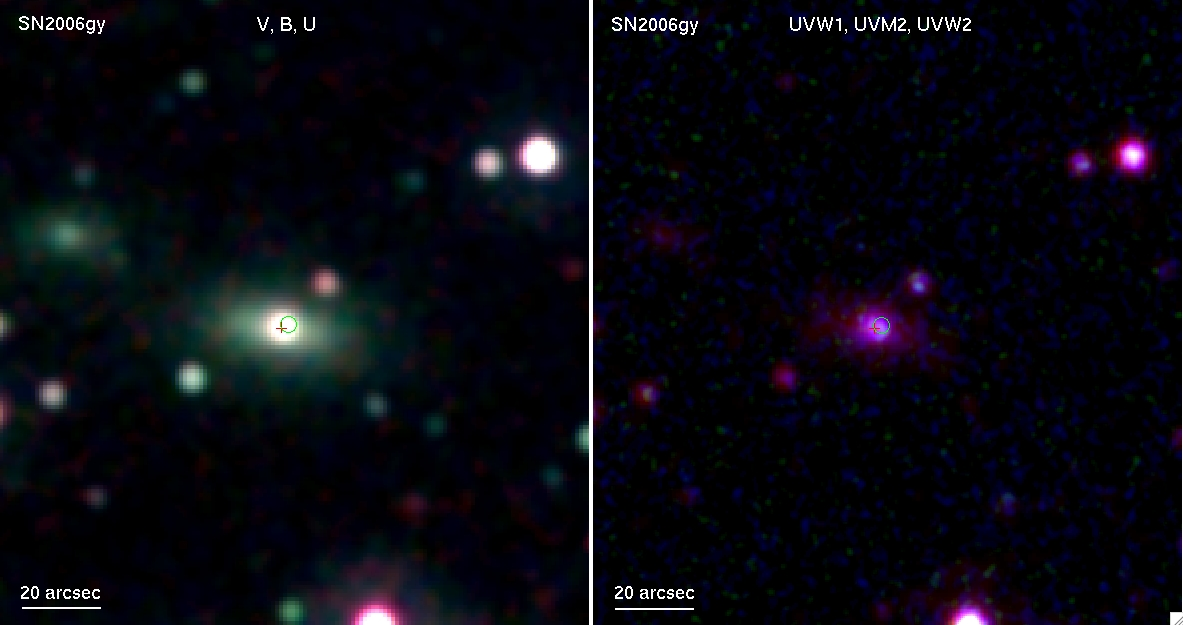
SN2006gy (top right) in ultraviolet

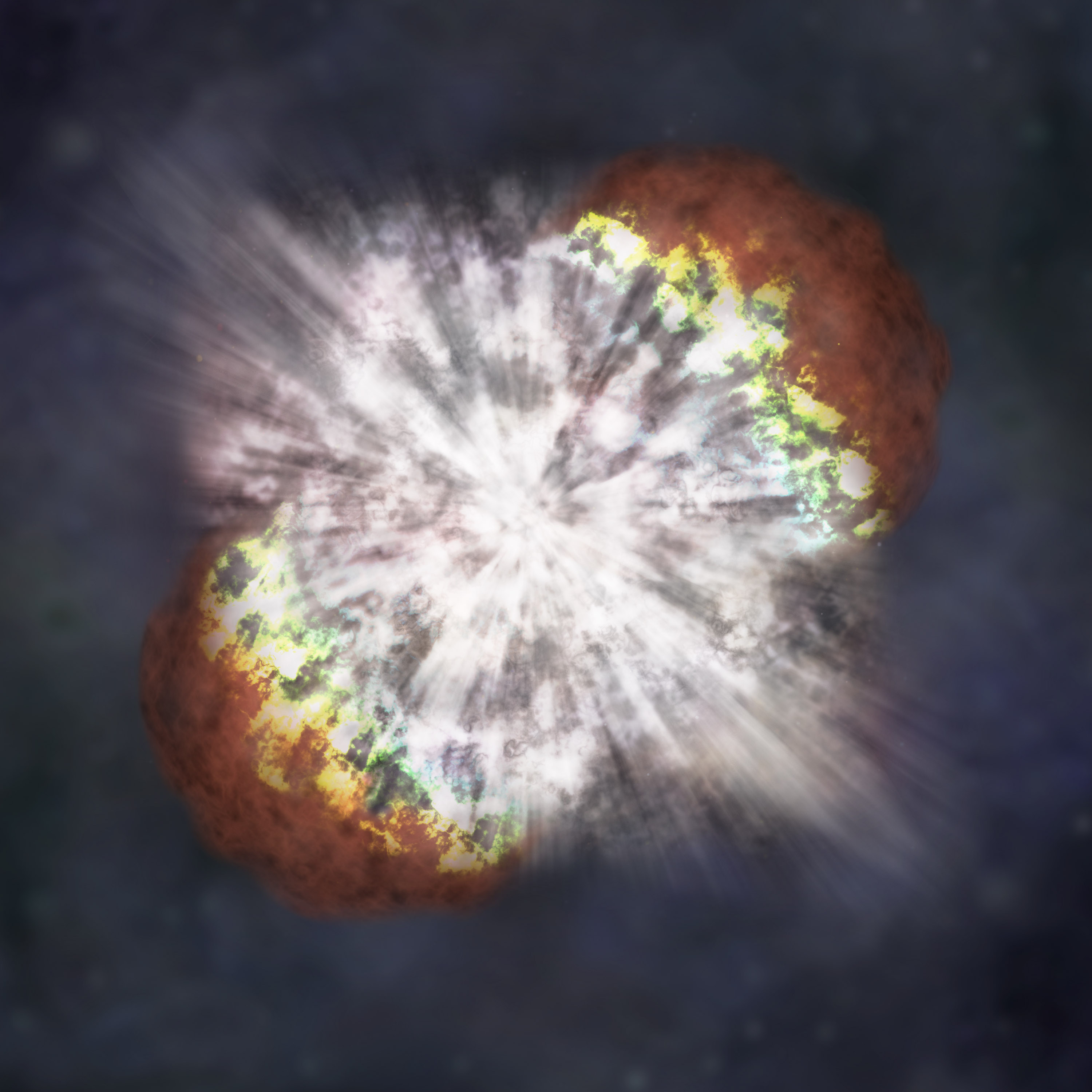
NASA artist's impression of the explosion of SN 2006gy
