= IC 755 =

Galaxy in the constellation Coma Berenices

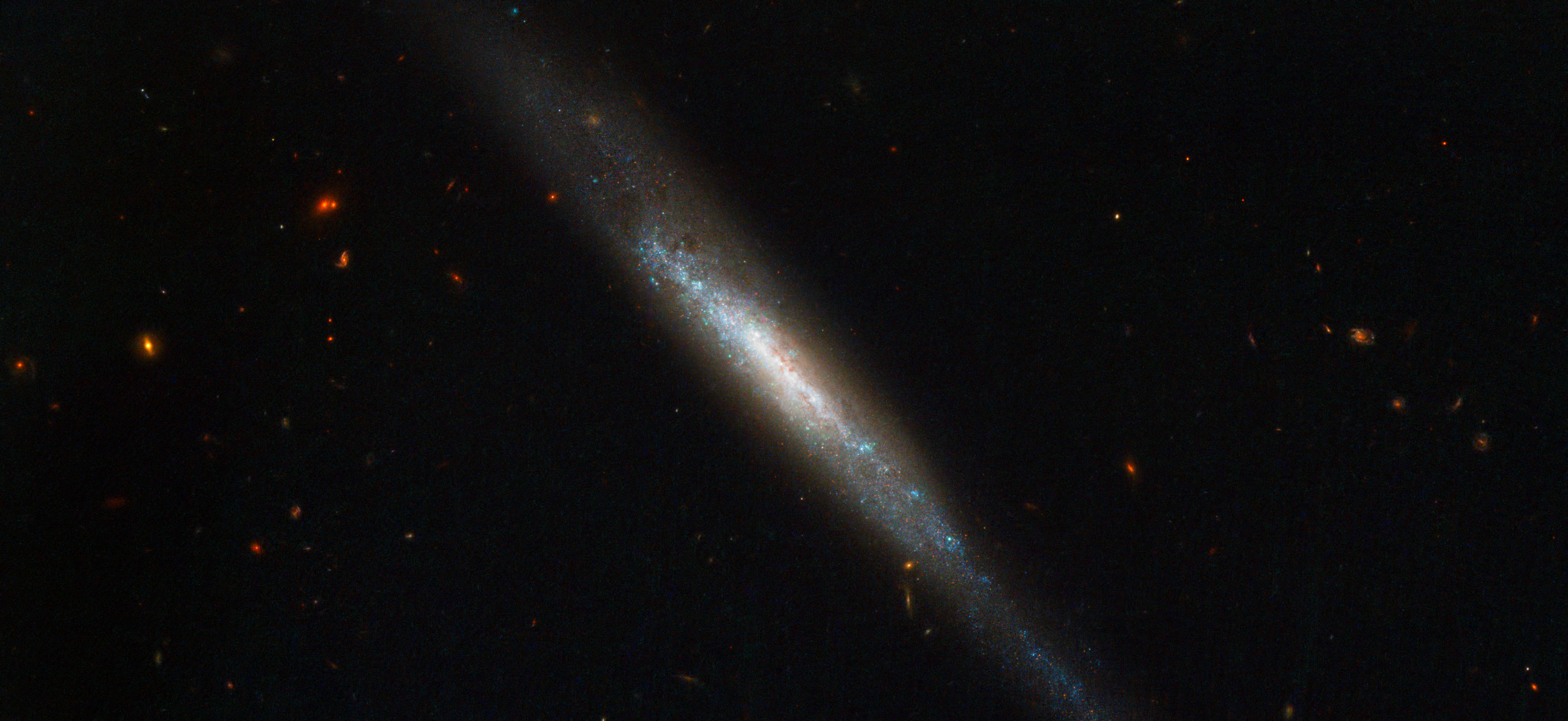
- IC 755 captured by Hubble's Wide Field Camera

Observation data (J2000 epoch)
- Constellation: Coma Berenices
- Right ascension: 12^{h} 01^{m} 10.382^{s}
- Declination: +14° 06′ 16.25″
- Redshift: 0.00511
- Heliocentric radial velocity: 1528 km/s
- Distance: 60.3 ± 4.9 Mly (18.5 ± 1.5 Mpc)
- Group or cluster: Virgo Cluster
- Apparent magnitude (B): 13.9

Characteristics
- Type: SBb? edge-on

Other designations
- NGC 4019, UGC 7001, MCG +02-31-014, PGC 37912

IC 755, also known as NGC 4019, is a barred spiral galaxy. It lies about 60 million light-years away (18 Megaparsecs) in the northern constellation of Coma Berenices. It is a member of the Virgo Cluster.

In 1999 a star within IC 755 was seen to explode as a supernova and named SN 1999an. Supernovae like SN 1999an are classified as Type II and they are dramatic events that mark the end of the lives of massive stars. The supernova was discovered by the Beijing Astronomical Observatory Supernova Survey.
