= SCP 06F6 =

Astronomical object discovered in 2006

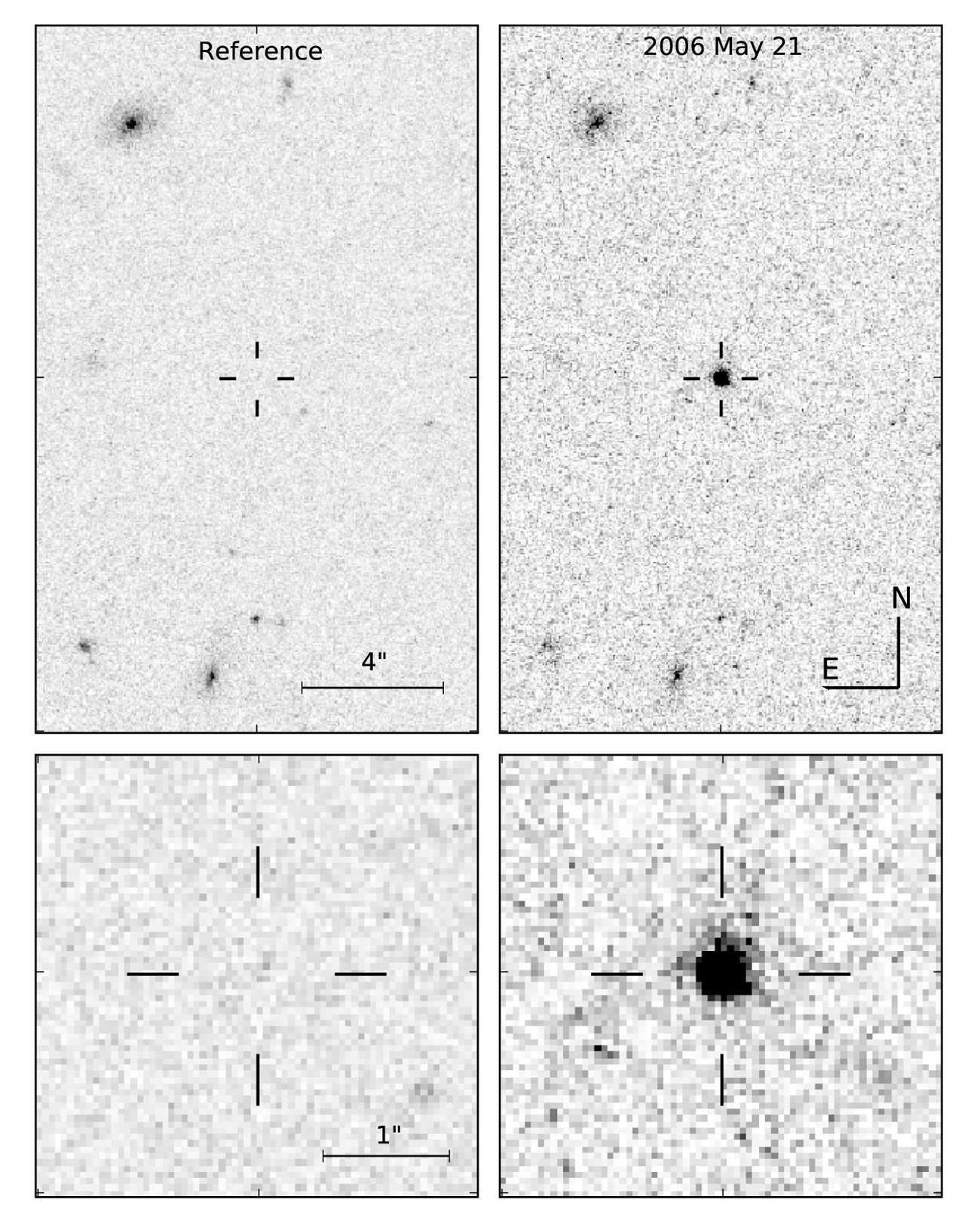
- The sudden appearance of the transient "mystery object" SCP 06F6 in Hubble Space Telescope's field of view. The lower image quadrant represents a zoomed in view.
- Event type: Supernova
- SNIc, SLSNIc
- Constellation: Boötes
- Other designations: SCP 06F6
- Related media on Commons

SCP 06F6 is (or was) an astronomical object of unknown type, discovered on 21 February 2006 in the constellation Boötes during a survey of galaxy cluster CL 1432.5+3332.8 with the Hubble Space Telescope's Advanced Camera for Surveys Wide Field Channel.

According to research authored by Kyle Barbary of the Supernova Cosmology Project, the object brightened over a period of roughly 100 days, reaching a peak intensity of magnitude 21; it then faded over a similar period.

Barbary and colleagues report that the spectrum of light emitted from the object does not match known supernova types, and is dissimilar to any known phenomenon in the Sloan Digital Sky Survey database. The light in the blue region shows broad line features, while the red region shows continuous emission. The spectrum shows a handful of spectral lines, but when astronomers try to trace any one of them to an element the other lines fail to match up with any other known elements.

Because of its uncommon spectrum, the team was not able to determine the distance to the object using standard redshift techniques; it is not even known whether the object is within or outside the Milky Way. Furthermore, no Milky Way star or external galaxy has been detected at this location, meaning any source is very faint.

The European X-ray satellite XMM Newton made an observation in early August 2006 which appears to show an X-ray glow around SCP 06F6, two orders of magnitude more luminous than that of supernovae.

Observations from the Palomar Transient Factory, reported in 2009, indicate a redshift z = 1.189 and a peak magnitude of −23.5 absolute (comparable to SN2005ap), making SCP 06F6 one of the most luminous transient phenomena known as of that date.

== Possible causes ==
Supernovae reach their maximum brightness in only 20 days, and then take much longer to fade away. Researchers had initially conjectured that SCP 06F6 might be an extremely remote supernova; relativistic time dilation might have caused a 20-day event to stretch out over a period of 100 days. But this explanation now seems unlikely. Other conjectures that have been advanced involve a collision between a white dwarf and an asteroid, or the collision of a white dwarf with a black hole.

An analysis by a team from the University of Warwick (Boris Gänsicke et al.) suggests that the light spectrum is "consistent with emission from a cool, carbon-rich atmosphere at a redshift of z~0.14", possibly representing the core collapse and explosion of a carbon star. Gänsicke's group concurs with Barbary and colleagues that SCP 06F6 may represent "a new class" of celestial object.

The analysis of Israeli astronomers of Technion suggests four alternative explanations for SCP 06F6, in plausibility order: the tidal destruction of a carbon-oxygen white dwarf by an intermediate-mass black hole, a Type Ia supernova exploding inside the dense stellar wind of a carbon star, an asteroid that was swallowed up by a white dwarf or, least likely, a core-collapse supernova.

Observations in 2009 indicate that it may be a pair-instability supernova.

The event was similar to SN 2005ap, and other unusually bright supernova suggesting that it was a new type of supernova.
