= NGC 1260 =

Galaxy in the constellation Perseus

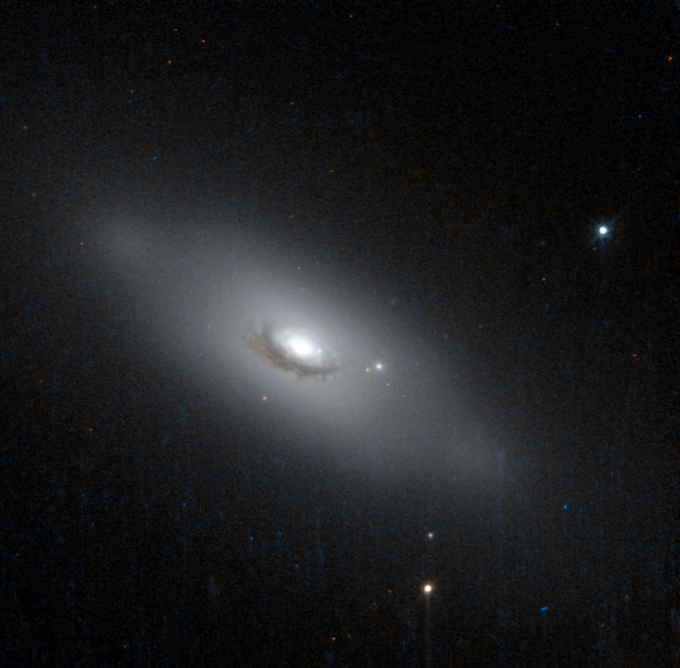
- NGC 1260 imaged by the Hubble Space Telescope

Observation data (J2000 epoch)
- Constellation: Perseus
- Right ascension: 03^{h} 17^{m} 27.2^{s}
- Declination: +41° 24′ 19″
- Redshift: 0.01919
- Heliocentric radial velocity: 5753 ± 14 km/s
- Distance: 250 ± 1.6 Mly (76.7 ± 0.5 Mpc)
- Apparent magnitude (V): 14.3

Characteristics
- Type: S0/a
- Apparent size (V): 1.1′ × 0.5′

Other designations
- UGC 02634, PGC 012219, MCG +07-07-047

NGC 1260 is a spiral or lenticular galaxy located 250 million light years away from earth in the constellation Perseus. It was discovered by French astronomer Guillaume Bigourdan on 19 October 1884. NGC 1260 is a member of the Perseus Cluster and forms a tight pair with the galaxy PGC 12230. This galaxy is dominated by a population of many old stars.

== Supernova ==
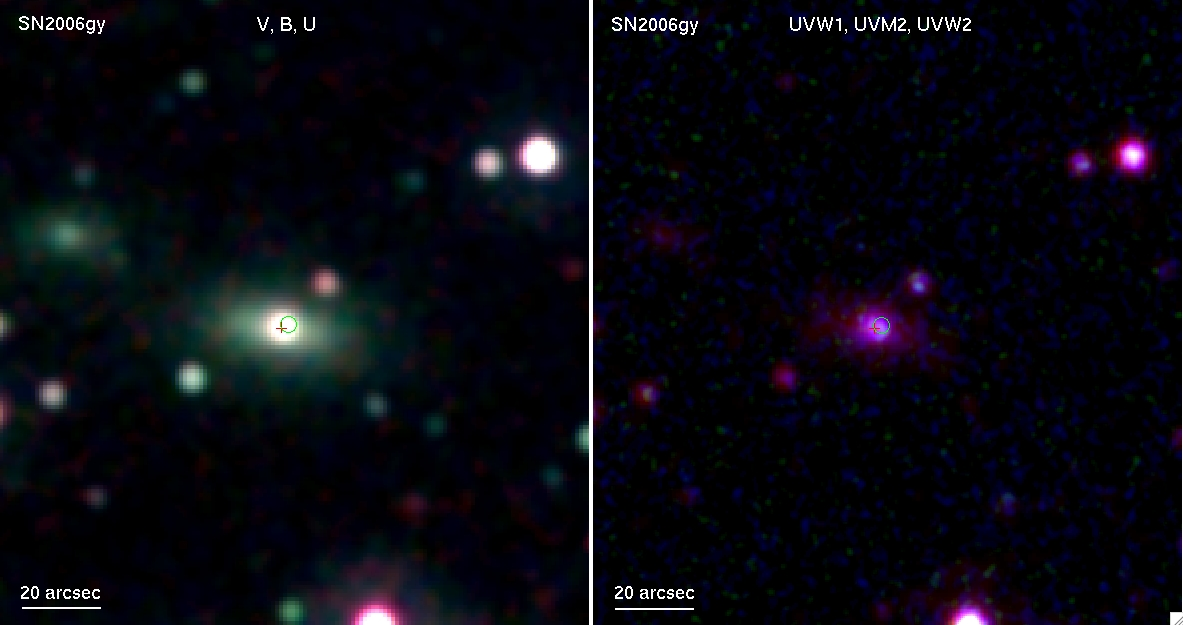
Supernova 2006gy imaged by the Swift spacecraft

One supernova has been observed in NGC 1260. SN 2006gy (Type IIn, mag. 15) was discovered by Robert Quimby and P. Mondol on 18 September 2006. It was the brightest and most energetic supernova known at the time of its discovery.
