= SN 2005ap =

Energetic supernova event of 2005 in constellation Coma Berenices

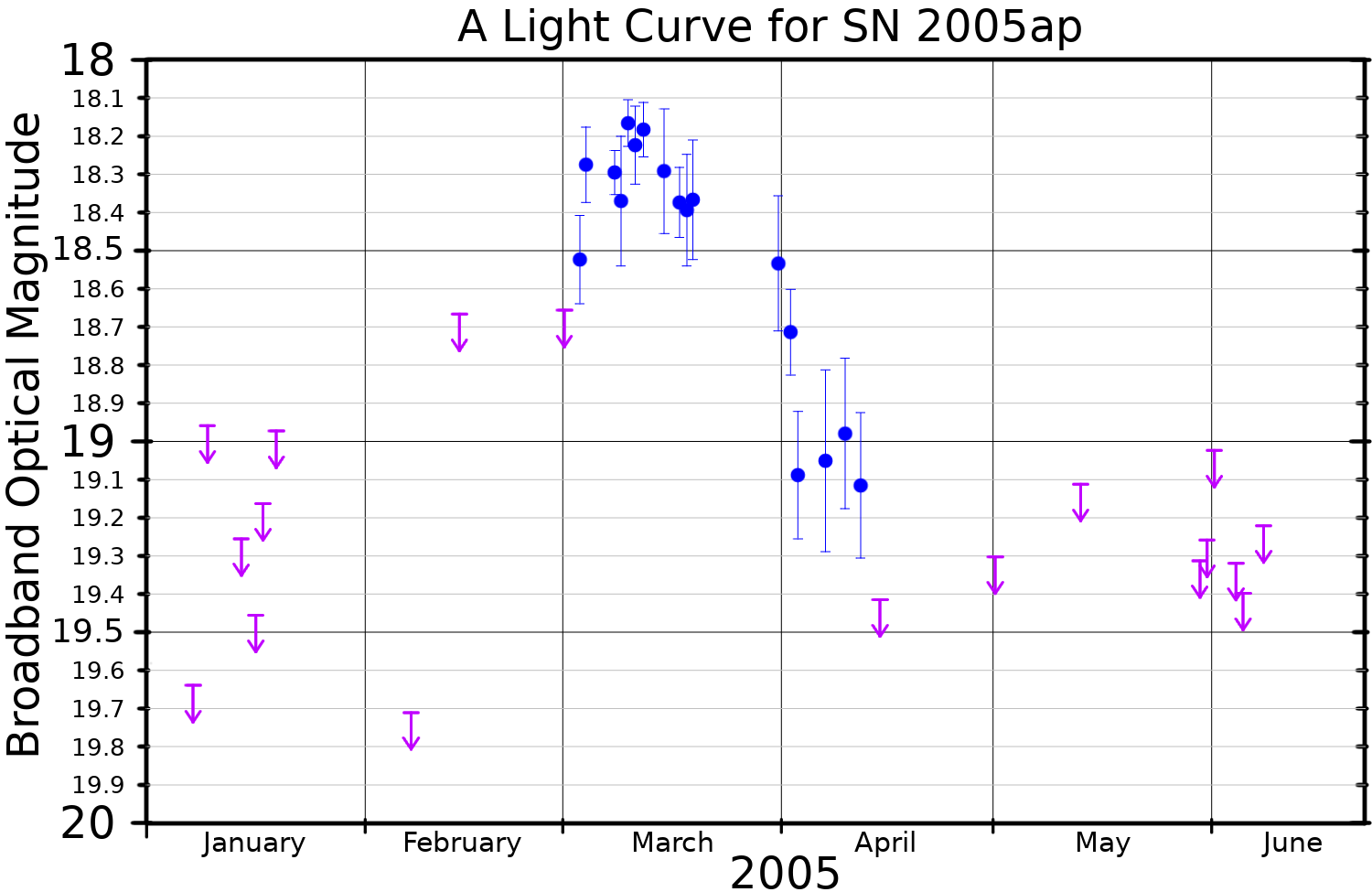
- A light curve for SN 2005ap, adapted from Quimby et al. (2007). The purple arrows mark the upper limits for nondetections.
- Event type: Hypernova
- Ic
- Date: by Robert Quimby; Texas Supernova Search
- Constellation: Coma Berenices
- Right ascension: 13^{h} 01^{m} 14.84^{s}
- Declination: +27° 43′ 31.4″
- Epoch: J2000.0
- Galactic coordinates: 048.8351 +87.7429
- Distance: 4.7 billion light years (1.441 billion pc )
- Host: SDSS J130114+2743
- Notable features: located 3.5" W and 3.4" N of the center of host galaxy
- Other designations: SN 2005ap

SN 2005ap was an extremely energetic Type Ic supernova in the galaxy SDSS J130115.12+274327.5. With a peak absolute magnitude of around −22.7, it is the second-brightest superluminous supernova yet recorded, twice as bright as the previous record holder, SN 2006gy, though SN 2005ap was eventually surpassed by ASASSN-15lh. It was initially classified as Type II-L, but later revised to Type Ic. It was discovered on 3 March 2005, on unfiltered optical images taken with the 0.45 m ROTSE-IIIb (Robotic Optical Transient Search Experiment) telescope, which is located at the McDonald Observatory in West Texas, by Robert Quimby, as part of the Texas Supernova Search that also discovered SN 2006gy. Although it was discovered before SN 2006gy, it was not recognized as being brighter until October 2007. As it occurred 4.7 billion light years from Earth, it was not visible to the naked eye.

Although SN 2005ap was twice as bright at its peak than SN 2006gy, it was not as energetic overall, as the former brightened and dimmed in a typical period of a few days whereas the latter remained very bright for many months. SN 2005ap was about 300 times brighter than normal for a Type II supernova. It has been speculated that this hypernova involved the formation of a quark star. Quimby has suggested that the hypernova is of a new type distinct from the standard Type II supernova, and his research group have identified five other supernovae similar to SN 2005ap and SCP 06F6, all of which were extremely bright and lacking in hydrogen.
