= Robert Quimby =

American astronomer

Robert M. Quimby (born September 9, 1976) is an American astronomer who received his Ph.D. in astronomy from the University of Texas at Austin. Prior to pursuing a career in astronomy, Robert Quimby was a member of the ska band Reel Big Fish, serving as a second trombonist.

As a lead member of the Texas Supernova Search (TSS), Quimby and his team used the relatively small 18-inch ROTSE-IIIb robotic telescope on McDonald Observatory's Mount Fowlkes, along with a program he designed to track supernovae. In 2005, Quimby discovered SN 2005ap, at this writing the brightest explosion ever recorded. Quimby measured the burst at 100 billion times the luminosity of the Sun, at a distance of 4.7 billion light-years. As a comparison, this supernova occurred about 160 million years before the formation of the Earth. Quimby continues his research at the California Institute of Technology in Pasadena, California.

He is currently Professor of Astronomy at San Diego State University and the director of Mount Laguna Observatory.
