= List of NGC objects (2001–3000) =

This is a list of NGC objects 2001–3000 from the New General Catalogue (NGC). The astronomical catalogue is composed mainly of star clusters, nebulae, and galaxies. Other objects in the catalogue can be found in the other subpages of the list of NGC objects.

The constellation information in these tables is taken from The Complete New General Catalogue and Index Catalogue of Nebulae and Star Clusters by J. L. E. Dreyer, which was accessed using the "VizieR Service". Galaxy types are identified using the NASA/IPAC Extragalactic Database. The other data of these tables are from the SIMBAD Astronomical Database unless otherwise stated.

== 2001–2100 ==
NGC number	Other names	Object type	Constellation	Right ascension (J2000)	Declination (J2000)	Apparent magnitude
2001		Association of stars	Dorado	05^{h} 29^{m} 02^{s}	−68° 46′ 18″	
2002		Open cluster	Dorado	05^{h} 30^{m} 20.4^{s}	−66° 53′ 03″	10.8
2003		Open cluster	Dorado	05^{h} 30^{m} 54^{s}	−66° 28′	11.3
2004		Open cluster	Dorado	05^{h} 30^{m} 40^{s}	−67° 17′ 18″	9.6
2005		Open cluster	Dorado	05^{h} 30^{m} 09^{s}	−69° 45′	11.6
2006		Open cluster	Dorado	05^{h} 31^{m} 19^{s}	−66° 58′ 24″	10.9
2007		Barred spiral galaxy	Pictor	05^{h} 34^{m} 59^{s}	−50° 55′ 18″	
2008		Spiral galaxy	Pictor	05^{h} 35^{m} 04^{s}	−50° 58′	
2009		Open cluster	Dorado	05^{h} 30^{m} 59^{s}	−69° 10′ 48″	11.0
2010		Open cluster	Mensa	05^{h} 30^{m} 35^{s}	−70° 49′ 06″	11.7
2011		Open cluster	Dorado	05^{h} 32^{m} 19^{s}	−67° 31′ 24″	10.6
2012		Unbarred lenticular galaxy	Mensa	05^{h} 22^{m} 35^{s}	−79° 51′ 06″	10.58
2013		Open cluster	Auriga	05^{h} 44^{m} 01^{s}	+55° 47′ 36″	
2014		Emission nebula	Dorado	05^{h} 32^{m} 24^{s}	−67° 41′	9.0
2015		Association of stars	Dorado	05^{h} 32^{m} 06^{s}	−69° 14′ 36″	10.4
2016		Open cluster	Mensa	05^{h} 31^{m} 38^{s}	−69° 56′ 48″	
2017		Open cluster	Lepus	05^{h} 39^{m} 16^{s}	−17° 50′ 58″	
2018		Association of stars	Mensa	05^{h} 31^{m} 21^{s}	−71° 4′ 11″	10.9
2019		Globular cluster	Mensa	05^{h} 31^{m} 56^{s}	−70° 9′ 36″	10.9
2020		Diffuse nebula	Dorado	05^{h} 33^{m} 12^{s}	−67° 43′	
2021		Association of stars	Dorado	05^{h} 33^{m} 30^{s}	−67° 27′	12.1
2022		Planetary nebula	Orion	05^{h} 42^{m} 06.2^{s}	+09° 05′ 11″	14.2
2023		Diffuse nebula	Orion	05^{h} 41^{m} 37.9^{s}	−02° 15′ 52″	
2024	Flame Nebula	Emission nebula	Orion	05^{h} 41^{m} 43^{s}	−01° 51′	
2025		Open cluster	Mensa	05^{h} 32^{m} 33^{s}	−71° 43′	10.9
2026		Star cluster candidate	Taurus	05^{h} 43^{m} 12^{s}	+20° 07′ 60″	
2027		Star cluster	Dorado	05^{h} 35^{m}	−66° 55′	11.0
2028		Open cluster	Mensa	05^{h} 33^{m} 49^{s}	−69° 57′ 06″	12.9
2029		Emission nebula	Dorado	05^{h} 35^{m} 38^{s}	−66° 02′	12.3
2030	(Part of the Seagull Nebula)	Emission nebula	Dorado	05^{h} 35^{m} 01^{s}	−67° 33′ 18″	
2031		Globular cluster	Mensa	05^{h} 33^{m} 41^{s}	−70° 59′ 12″	10.8
2032	Seagull Nebula	Emission nebula	Dorado	05^{h} 35^{m} 20^{s}	−67° 34′ 37″	
2033		Association of stars	Dorado	05^{h} 34^{m} 31^{s}	−69° 46′ 48″	11.6
2034		Association of stars	Dorado	05^{h} 35^{m} 32^{s}	−66° 54′ 12″	
2035	(Part of the Seagull Nebula)	Emission nebula	Dorado	05^{h} 35^{m} 31^{s}	−67° 35′ 03″	11.0
2036		Open cluster	Mensa	05^{h} 34^{m} 31^{s}	−70° 04′	12.8
2037		Interstellar matter	Dorado	05^{h} 35^{m}	−69° 43′ 54″	10.3
2038		Open cluster	Mensa	05^{h} 34^{m} 41^{s}	−70° 33′ 42″	11.9
2039		Star cluster	Orion	05^{h} 44^{m}	+08° 41′ 30″	
2040	(Located in the Seagull Nebula)	Open cluster	Dorado	05^{h} 36^{m} 06^{s}	−67° 34′ 01″	11.5
2041		Open cluster	Dorado	05^{h} 36^{m} 28^{s}	−66° 59′ 24″	10.4
2042		Star cluster candidate	Dorado	05^{h} 36^{m} 10^{s}	−68° 55′ 24″	9.6
2043		Open cluster	Mensa	05^{h} 35^{m} 56.7^{s}	−70° 04′ 23″	
2044		Association of stars	Dorado	05^{h} 36^{m} 06^{s}	−69° 11′ 55″	10.6
2045		Interstellar matter	Taurus	05^{h} 45^{m}	+12° 54′	
2046		Open cluster	Mensa	05^{h} 35^{m} 38^{s}	−70° 14′ 30″	12.6
2047		Open cluster	Mensa	05^{h} 35^{m} 53^{s}	−70° 11′ 42″	13.2
2048		Emission nebula	Dorado	05^{h} 35^{m} 55^{s}	−69° 39′	12.2
2049		Unbarred spiral galaxy	Columba	05^{h} 43^{m} 15^{s}	−30° 04′ 42″	
2050		Association of stars	Dorado	05^{h} 36^{m} 39^{s}	−69° 23′	9.3
2051		Open cluster	Mensa	05^{h} 36^{m} 07^{s}	−71° 00′ 41″	11.7
2052		Emission nebula	Dorado	05^{h} 37^{m} 11^{s}	−69° 46′ 27″	
2053		Open cluster	Dorado	05^{h} 37^{m} 40^{s}	−67° 24′ 47″	12.2
2054		Asterism of four stars, mistaken for a galaxy	Orion	05^{h} 45^{m} 15^{s}	−10° 04′ 59″	
2055		Association of stars	Dorado	05^{h} 36^{m} 45^{s}	−69° 29′ 55″	8.4
2056		Star cluster	Mensa	05^{h} 36^{m} 34^{s}	−70° 40′ 07″	11.8
2057		Star cluster	Mensa	05^{h} 36^{m} 55^{s}	−70° 16′ 05″	12.2
2058		Star cluster	Mensa	05^{h} 36^{m} 59^{s}	−70° 09′ 45″	11.9
2059		Star cluster	Mensa	05^{h} 37^{m} 02^{s}	−70° 07′ 55″	
2060	(Located in the Tarantula Nebula)	Star cluster	Dorado	05^{h} 37^{m} 51^{s}	−69° 10′ 24″	9.6
2061		Asterism, mistaken for an open cluster	Columba	05^{h} 42^{m} 42^{s}	−34° 00′ 36″	
2062		Star cluster	Dorado	05^{h} 40^{m} 04^{s}	−66° 52′ 34″	12.7
2063		Unknown, possibly an asterism	Orion	05^{h} 46^{m} 43^{s}	+08° 46′ 54″	
2064		Reflection nebula	Orion	05^{h} 46^{m} 36^{s}	+00° 03′ 24″	8.2
2065		Star cluster	Mensa	05^{h} 37^{m} 38^{s}	−70° 14′ 11″	
2066		Star cluster	Mensa	05^{h} 37^{m} 42^{s}	−70° 09′ 54″	13.1
2067		Reflection nebula	Orion	05^{h} 46^{m} 36^{s}	+00° 07′ 00″	
2068	Messier 78	Diffuse nebula	Orion	05^{h} 46^{m} 46.7^{s}	+00° 00′ 50″	8.0
2069	(Part of the Tarantula Nebula)	Interstellar matter	Dorado	05^{h} 38^{m} 42^{s}	−69° 00′ 30″	10.1
2070	30 Doradus (located in Tarantula Nebula)	Open cluster	Dorado	05^{h} 38^{m} 42^{s}	−69° 06′	7.3
2071		Reflection nebula	Orion	05^{h} 47^{m} 07.2^{s}	+00° 17′ 39″	
2072		Star cluster	Mensa	05^{h} 38^{m} 24^{s}	−70° 13′ 52″	13.2
2073		Lenticular galaxy	Lepus	05^{h} 45^{m} 54^{s}	−21° 59′ 57″	
2074	GC 1272, JH 2942	Emission nebula	Dorado	05^{h} 39^{m} 03.0^{s}	−69° 29′ 54″	~8
2075		Star cluster	Mensa	05^{h} 38^{m} 21^{s}	−70° 41′ 06″	11.5
2076		Lenticular galaxy	Lepus	05^{h} 46^{m} 47^{s}	−16° 46′ 57″	
2077	(Located in the Ghost Head Nebula)	Star cluster	Dorado	05^{h} 39^{m} 35^{s}	−69° 39′ 19″	11.7
2078		Emission nebula	Dorado	05^{h} 39^{m} 54^{s}	−69° 44′ 54″	10.9
2079		Star cluster	Dorado	05^{h} 39^{m} 39^{s}	−69° 46′ 24″	
2080	Ghost Head Nebula	Emission nebula	Dorado	05^{h} 39^{m} 44^{s}	−69° 38′ 50″	10.4
2081		Emission nebula	Dorado	05^{h} 39^{m} 11^{s}	−69° 30′ 16″	
2082		Intermediate spiral galaxy	Dorado	05^{h} 41^{m} 51^{s}	−64° 18′ 04″	12.62
2083		Star cluster	Dorado	05^{h} 39^{m} 59^{s}	−69° 44′ 06″	10.8
2084		Star cluster	Dorado	05^{h} 40^{m} 17^{s}	−69° 45′ 24″	
2085		Star cluster	Dorado	05^{h} 40^{m} 08^{s}	−69° 40′ 20″	12.1
2086		Star cluster	Dorado	05^{h} 40^{m} 24^{s}	−69° 40′ 17″	12.0
2087		Barred spiral galaxy	Pictor	05^{h} 44^{m} 16^{s}	−55° 31′ 57″	
2088		Star cluster	Dorado	05^{h} 41^{m} 00^{s}	−68° 27′ 55″	12.5
2089		Intermediate lenticular galaxy	Lepus	05^{h} 47^{m} 51^{s}	−17° 36′ 09″	
2090		Spiral galaxy	Columba	05^{h} 47^{m} 02.3^{s}	−34° 15′ 05″	11.9
2091		Star cluster	Dorado	05^{h} 40^{m} 59^{s}	−69° 26′ 14″	12.1
2092		Star cluster	Dorado	05^{h} 41^{m} 23^{s}	−69° 13′ 31″	
2093		Association of stars	Dorado	05^{h} 41^{m} 51^{s}	−68° 54′ 58″	11.6
2094		Star cluster	Dorado	05^{h} 42^{m} 12^{s}	−68° 55′ 00″	
2095		Star cluster	Dorado	05^{h} 42^{m} 51^{s}	−67° 19′ 18″	13.1
2096		Star cluster	Dorado	05^{h} 42^{m} 16^{s}	−68° 27′ 35″	11.3
2097		Star cluster	Dorado	05^{h} 44^{m} 07^{s}	−62° 47′ 01″	13.7
2098		Star cluster	Dorado	05^{h} 42^{m} 30^{s}	−68° 16′ 26″	10.7
2099	Messier 37	Open cluster	Auriga	05^{h} 52^{m} 19^{s}	+32° 33′	6.2
2100		Open cluster	Dorado	05^{h} 42^{m} 09^{s}	−69° 12′ 43″	9.6

== 2101–2200 ==
NGC number	Other names	Object type	Constellation	Right ascension (J2000)	Declination (J2000)	Apparent magnitude
2101		Barred irregular galaxy	Pictor	05^{h} 46^{m} 23^{s}	−52° 05′ 21″	
2102		Star cluster	Dorado	05^{h} 42^{m} 25^{s}	−69° 29′ 30″	11.4
2103		Association of stars	Mensa	05^{h} 41^{m} 38^{s}	−71° 19′ 49″	10.8
2104		Barred Magellanic spiral galaxy	Pictor	05^{h} 47^{m} 05^{s}	−51° 33′ 11″	
2105		Star cluster	Dorado	05^{h} 44^{m} 19^{s}	−66° 55′ 02″	12.2
2106		Unbarred lenticular galaxy	Lepus	05^{h} 50^{m} 47^{s}	−21° 34′ 02″	
2107		Star cluster	Mensa	05^{h} 43^{m} 12^{s}	−70° 38′ 27″	11.5
2108		Globular cluster	Dorado	05^{h} 43^{m} 56^{s}	−69° 10′ 54″	12.3
2109		Star cluster	Dorado	05^{h} 44^{m} 23^{s}	−68° 32′ 49″	12.2
2110		Intermediate lenticular Seyfert galaxy	Orion	05^{h} 52^{m} 11^{s}	−07° 27′ 23″	13.5
2111		Star cluster	Mensa	05^{h} 44^{m} 36^{s}	−70° 59′ 45″	12.5
2112		Open cluster	Orion	05^{h} 53^{m} 49^{s}	+00° 24′ 11″	9.1
2113		Star cluster	Dorado	05^{h} 45^{m} 22^{s}	−69° 46′ 24″	
2114		Open cluster	Dorado	05^{h} 46^{m} 12^{s}	−68° 02′ 53″	12.5
2115		Lenticular galaxy	Pictor	05^{h} 51^{m} 20^{s}	−50° 34′ 58″	14.15
2116		Open cluster	Dorado	05^{h} 47^{m} 15^{s}	−68° 30′ 29″	12.9
2117		Open cluster	Dorado	05^{h} 47^{m} 47^{s}	−67° 27′ 05″	11.7
2118		Star cluster	Dorado	05^{h} 47^{m} 39^{s}	−69° 07′ 53″	13.4
2119		Elliptical galaxy	Orion	05^{h} 57^{m} 27^{s}	+11° 56′ 57″	13.6
2120		Star cluster	Dorado	05^{h} 50^{m} 35^{s}	−63° 40′ 32″	12.7
2121		Star cluster	Mensa	05^{h} 48^{m} 13^{s}	−71° 28′ 52″	12.4
2122		Association of stars	Mensa	05^{h} 48^{m} 55^{s}	−70° 04′ 06″	10.4
2123		Star cluster	Dorado	05^{h} 51^{m} 43^{s}	−65° 19′ 14″	12.6
2124		Unbarred spiral galaxy	Lepus	05^{h} 57^{m} 52^{s}	−20° 05′ 04″	
2125		Star cluster	Dorado	05^{h} 50^{m} 53^{s}	−69° 28′ 41″	
2126		Open cluster	Auriga	06^{h} 02^{m} 38^{s}	+49° 52′ 59″	10
2127		Star cluster	Dorado	05^{h} 51^{m} 22^{s}	−69° 21′ 34″	11.6
2128		Lenticular galaxy	Camelopardalis	06^{h} 04^{m} 34^{s}	+57° 37′ 40″	
2129		Open cluster	Gemini	06^{h} 01^{m} 06^{s}	+23° 19′ 20″	6.7
2130		Globular cluster	Dorado	05^{h} 52^{m} 24^{s}	−67° 20′ 03″	12.0
2131		Barred Magellanic irregular galaxy	Lepus	05^{h} 58^{m} 48^{s}	−26° 39′ 11″	
2132		Open cluster	Pictor	05^{h} 55^{m} 19^{s}	−59° 55′ 12″	
2133		Star cluster	Mensa	05^{h} 51^{m} 29^{s}	−71° 10′ 26″	
2134		Star cluster	Mensa	05^{h} 51^{m} 56^{s}	−71° 05′ 54″	
2135		Open cluster	Dorado	05^{h} 53^{m} 33^{s}	−67° 25′ 37″	12.1
2136		Star cluster	Dorado	05^{h} 53^{m} 02^{s}	−69° 29′ 24″	10.7
2137		Star cluster	Dorado	05^{h} 53^{m} 12^{s}	−69° 29′ 00″	12.7
2138		Star cluster	Dorado	05^{h} 54^{m} 49^{s}	−65° 50′ 13″	13.8
2139	IC 2154	Intermediate spiral galaxy	Lepus	06^{h} 01^{m} 08^{s}	−23° 40′ 20″	11.7
2140		Open cluster	Dorado	05^{h} 54^{m} 17^{s}	−68° 36′ 00″	12.4
2141		Open cluster	Orion	06^{h} 02^{m} 56^{s}	+10° 27′ 04″	
2142	Likely 3 Monocerotis	Binary star	Monoceros	06^{h} 01^{m} 53^{s}	−10° 36′ 03″	4.92
2143		Open cluster	Orion	06^{h} 03^{m} 06^{s}	+05° 46′ 00″	
2144		Unbarred spiral galaxy	Mensa	05^{h} 40^{m} 57^{s}	−82° 07′ 10″	
2145		Star cluster	Mensa	05^{h} 54^{m} 23^{s}	−70° 54′ 08″	12.1
2146		Barred spiral galaxy	Camelopardalis	06^{h} 18^{m} 38^{s}	+78° 21′ 21″	11.1
2147		Star cluster	Dorado	05^{h} 55^{m} 46^{s}	−68° 12′ 07″	12.9
2148		Unbarred spiral galaxy	Pictor	05^{h} 58^{m} 46^{s}	−59° 07′ 33″	
2149		Reflection nebula	Monoceros	06^{h} 03^{m} 28^{s}	−09° 43′ 57″	
2150		Intermediate spiral galaxy	Dorado	05^{h} 55^{m} 46^{s}	−69° 33′ 39″	14.3
2151		Star cluster	Dorado	05^{h} 56^{m} 21^{s}	−69° 01′ 06″	
2152		Barred spiral galaxy	Pictor	06^{h} 00^{m} 55^{s}	−50° 44′ 27″	
2153		Star cluster	Dorado	05^{h} 57^{m} 52^{s}	−66° 24′ 02″	13.1
2154		Star cluster	Dorado	05^{h} 57^{m} 38^{s}	−67° 15′ 42″	11.8
2155		Star cluster	Dorado	05^{h} 58^{m} 32^{s}	−65° 28′ 39″	12.6
2156		Globular cluster	Dorado	05^{h} 57^{m} 45^{s}	−68° 27′ 36″	11.4
2157		Star cluster	Dorado	05^{h} 57^{m} 35^{s}	−69° 11′ 49″	10.2
2158		Open cluster	Gemini	06^{h} 07^{m} 25^{s}	+24° 05′ 56″	9.5
2159		Globular cluster	Dorado	05^{h} 57^{m} 57^{s}	−68° 37′ 24″	11.4
2160		Open cluster	Dorado	05^{h} 58^{m} 13^{s}	−68° 17′ 24″	12.2
2161		Star cluster	Mensa	05^{h} 55^{m} 43^{s}	−74° 21′ 14″	13.0
2162		Globular cluster	Dorado	06^{h} 00^{m} 30^{s}	−63° 43′ 18″	12.7
2163		Reflection nebula	Orion	06^{h} 07^{m} 50^{s}	+18° 39′ 27″	
2164	ESO 57-SC62	Open cluster	Dorado	05^{h} 58^{m} 54^{s}	−68° 31′ 00″	10.5
2165		Open cluster	Auriga	06^{h} 11^{m} 04^{s}	+51° 40′ 36″	
2166		Open cluster	Dorado	05^{h} 59^{m} 34^{s}	−67° 56′ 31″	12.9
2167	Likely HD 41794	Star	Monoceros	06^{h} 06^{m} 55^{s}	−06° 12′ 14″	6.6
2168	Messier 35	Open cluster	Gemini	06^{h} 09^{m} 05^{s}	+24° 20′ 10″	5.3
2169		Open cluster	Orion	06^{h} 08^{m} 33^{s}	+13° 57′ 57″	6.0
2170		Diffuse nebula	Monoceros	06^{h} 07^{m} 48^{s}	−06° 23′ 06″	
2171		Open cluster	Mensa	05^{h} 58^{m} 26^{s}	−70° 39′ 15″	
2172		Open cluster	Dorado	06^{h} 00^{m} 05^{s}	−68° 38′ 11″	11.9
2173		Globular cluster	Mensa	05^{h} 57^{m} 40^{s}	−72° 58′ 41″	12.7
2174		Diffuse nebula	Orion	06^{h} 09^{m} 42^{s}	+20° 30′ 00″	6.8
2175	(Located in NGC 2174)	Open cluster	Orion	06^{h} 09^{m} 39^{s}	+20° 29′ 12″	6.8
2176		Star cluster	Dorado	06^{h} 01^{m} 20^{s}	−66° 51′ 15″	
2177		Open cluster	Dorado	06^{h} 01^{m} 16^{s}	−67° 44′ 02″	12.8
2178		Elliptical galaxy	Pictor	06^{h} 02^{m} 48^{s}	−63° 45′ 49″	
2179		Unbarred spiral galaxy	Lepus	06^{h} 08^{m} 02^{s}	−21° 44′ 48″	12.5
2180		Open cluster	Orion	06^{h} 09^{m} 48^{s}	+04° 48′ 24″	
2181		Star cluster	Dorado	06^{h} 02^{m} 43^{s}	−65° 15′ 54″	13.6
2182		Reflection nebula	Monoceros	06^{h} 09^{m} 30^{s}	−06° 19′ 40″	
2183		Reflection nebula	Monoceros	06^{h} 10^{m} 47^{s}	−06° 12′ 45″	
2184		Open cluster	Orion	06^{h} 06^{m} 46^{s}	−02° 00′ 00″	
2185		Reflection nebula	Monoceros	06^{h} 11^{m} 00^{s}	−06° 13′ 36″	
2186		Open cluster	Orion	06^{h} 12^{m} 07^{s}	+05° 27′ 11″	8.7
2187		Lenticular galaxy pair	Dorado	06^{h} 03^{m} 48^{s}	−69° 34′ 59″	
2188		Barred Magellanic spiral galaxy	Columba	06^{h} 10^{m} 10^{s}	−34° 06′ 22″	11.8
2189		Open cluster	Orion	06^{h} 12^{m} 07^{s}	+01° 03′ 18″	
2190		Globular cluster	Mensa	06^{h} 01^{m} 02^{s}	−74° 43′ 36″	12.9
2191		Barred lenticular galaxy	Carina	06^{h} 08^{m} 24^{s}	−52° 30′ 44″	
2192		Open cluster	Auriga	06^{h} 15^{m} 17^{s}	+39° 50′ 46″	10.9
2193		Star cluster	Dorado	06^{h} 06^{m} 17^{s}	−65° 05′ 56″	13.4
2194		Open cluster	Orion	06^{h} 13^{m} 42^{s}	+12° 48′ 06″	9.0
2195		Interstellar matter	Orion	06^{h} 14^{m} 24^{s}	+17° 39′ 00″	
2196		Unbarred spiral galaxy	Lepus	06^{h} 12^{m} 10^{s}	−21° 48′ 22″	10.9
2197		Open cluster	Dorado	06^{h} 06^{m} 07^{s}	−67° 05′ 54″	13.5
2198		Unknown	Orion	06^{h} 13^{m} 54^{s}	+00° 59′ 31″	
2199		Unbarred spiral galaxy	Mensa	06^{h} 04^{m} 45^{s}	−73° 23′ 59″	
2200		Barred spiral galaxy	Puppis	06^{h} 13^{m} 18^{s}	−43° 39′ 47″	

== 2201–2300 ==
NGC number	Other names	Object type	Constellation	Right ascension (J2000)	Declination (J2000)	Apparent magnitude
2201		Intermediate spiral galaxy	Puppis	06^{h} 13^{m} 32^{s}	−43° 42′ 17″	
2202		Open cluster	Orion	06^{h} 16^{m} 54^{s}	+06° 00′ 00″	
2203		Star cluster	Mensa	06^{h} 04^{m} 42^{s}	−75° 26′ 18″	11.3
2204		Open cluster	Canis Major	06^{h} 15^{m} 32^{s}	−18° 40′ 12″	8.6
2205		Intermediate lenticular galaxy	Pictor	06^{h} 10^{m} 33^{s}	−62° 32′ 18″	
2206		Intermediate spiral galaxy	Canis Major	06^{h} 16^{m} 00^{s}	−26° 45′ 56″	
2207		Interacting galaxy	Canis Major	06^{h} 16^{m} 22^{s}	−21° 22′ 22″	10.7
2208		Lenticular galaxy	Auriga	06^{h} 22^{m} 35^{s}	+51° 54′ 35″	12.6
2209		Globular cluster	Mensa	06^{h} 08^{m} 34^{s}	−73° 50′ 30″	13.2
2210		Globular cluster	Dorado	06^{h} 11^{m} 31^{s}	−69° 07′ 17″	10.9
2211	Adjacent to NGC 2212	Barred lenticular galaxy	Canis Major	06^{h} 18^{m} 30^{s}	−18° 32′ 14″	
2212	Adjacent to NGC 2211	Barred lenticular galaxy	Canis Major	06^{h} 18^{m} 36^{s}	−18° 31′ 11″	
2213		Star cluster	Mensa	06^{h} 10^{m} 42^{s}	−71° 31′ 44″	
2214		Open cluster	Dorado	06^{h} 12^{m} 57^{s}	−68° 15′ 36″	10.9
2215		Open cluster	Monoceros	06^{h} 20^{m} 48^{s}	−07° 16′ 37″	8.5
2216		Intermediate spiral galaxy	Canis Major	06^{h} 21^{m} 31^{s}	−22° 05′ 15″	
2217		Barred lenticular LINER galaxy	Canis Major	06^{h} 21^{m} 40^{s}	−27° 14′ 02″	11.9
2218		Unknown	Gemini	06^{h} 24^{m} 41^{s}	+19° 20′ 08″	
2219		Open cluster	Monoceros	06^{h} 23^{m} 44^{s}	−04° 41′ 42″	
2220		Open cluster	Puppis	06^{h} 20^{m} 35^{s}	−44° 40′ 42″	
2221	Adjacent to NGC 2222	Unbarred spiral galaxy	Pictor	06^{h} 20^{m} 16^{s}	−57° 34′ 42″	
2222	Adjacent to NGC 2221	Barred spiral galaxy	Pictor	06^{h} 20^{m} 17^{s}	−57° 32′ 04″	
2223		Intermediate spiral galaxy	Canis Major	06^{h} 24^{m} 36^{s}	−22° 50′ 18″	
2224		Open cluster	Gemini	06^{h} 27^{m} 32^{s}	+12° 39′ 20″	
2225	Adjacent to NGC 2226	Open cluster	Monoceros	06^{h} 26^{m} 37^{s}	−09° 38′ 35″	
2226	Adjacent to NGC 2225	Unknown	Monoceros	06^{h} 26^{m} 41^{s}	−09° 38′ 57″	
2227		Barred spiral galaxy	Canis Major	06^{h} 25^{m} 58^{s}	−22° 00′ 17″	12.15
2228		Unbarred lenticular galaxy	Dorado	06^{h} 21^{m} 16^{s}	−64° 27′ 32″	
2229	Adjacent to NGC 2230	Intermediate lenticular galaxy	Dorado	06^{h} 21^{m} 24^{s}	−64° 57′ 24″	
2230	Abell 3389, adjacent to NGC 2229	Barred lenticular galaxy	Dorado	06^{h} 21^{m} 28^{s}	−64° 59′ 34″	
2231		Globular cluster	Dorado	06^{h} 20^{m} 43^{s}	−67° 31′ 07″	13.2
2232		Open cluster	Monoceros	06^{h} 27^{m} 33^{s}	−04° 44′ 56″	3.9
2233		Lenticular galaxy	Dorado	06^{h} 21^{m} 40^{s}	−65° 02′ 00″	
2234		Open cluster	Gemini	06^{h} 29^{m} 20^{s}	+16° 45′ 32″	
2235		Elliptical galaxy	Dorado	06^{h} 22^{m} 22^{s}	−64° 56′ 03″	
2236		Open cluster	Monoceros	06^{h} 29^{m} 40^{s}	+06° 50′ 02″	8.5
2237	(Part of the Rosette Nebula)	Diffuse nebula	Monoceros	06^{h} 30^{m} 36^{s}	+04° 58′ 51″	9
2238	(Part of the Rosette Nebula)	Diffuse nebula	Monoceros	06^{h} 30^{m} 30^{s}	+05° 03′ 00″	9
2239	(Located in Rosette Nebula)	Open cluster	Monoceros	06^{h} 30^{m} 56^{s}	+04° 56′ 54″	5.3
2240		Open cluster	Auriga	06^{h} 33^{m} 10^{s}	+35° 15′ 00″	
2241		Star cluster	Dorado	06^{h} 22^{m} 53^{s}	−68° 55′ 30″	13.3
2242		Planetary nebula	Auriga	06^{h} 34^{m} 07^{s}	+44° 46′ 38″	
2243		Open cluster	Canis Major	06^{h} 29^{m} 35^{s}	−31° 16′ 55″	9.4
2244	Satellite Cluster (located in Rosette Nebula)	Open cluster	Monoceros	06^{h} 32^{m} 11^{s}	+04° 54′ 50″	5.3
2245		Reflection nebula	Monoceros	06^{h} 32^{m} 41^{s}	+10° 09′ 34″	
2246	(Part of the Rosette Nebula)	Diffuse nebula	Monoceros	06^{h} 32^{m}	+05° 07′	9
2247		Reflection nebula	Monoceros	06^{h} 33^{m} 04^{s}	+10° 19′ 21″	
2248		Star cluster	Gemini	06^{h} 34^{m} 35^{s}	+26° 18′ 16″	
2249		Globular cluster	Dorado	06^{h} 25^{m} 49^{s}	−68° 55′ 12″	12.23
2250		Open cluster	Monoceros	06^{h} 33^{m} 41^{s}	−05° 04′ 48″	8.9
2251		Open cluster	Monoceros	06^{h} 34^{m} 43^{s}	+08° 20′ 13″	7.3
2252		Open cluster	Monoceros	06^{h} 35^{m} 01^{s}	+05° 25′ 13″	7.7
2253		Active galactic nucleus	Camelopardalis	06^{h} 43^{m} 15^{s}	+65° 40′ 39″	
2254		Open cluster	Monoceros	06^{h} 35^{m} 48^{s}	+07° 40′ 16″	9.1
2255		Intermediate spiral galaxy	Columba	06^{h} 33^{m} 59^{s}	−34° 48′ 45″	
2256		Intermediate lenticular galaxy	Camelopardalis	06^{h} 47^{m} 14^{s}	+74° 14′ 12″	
2257		Globular cluster	Dorado	06^{h} 30^{m} 13^{s}	−64° 19′ 40″	12.62
2258		Unbarred lenticular galaxy	Camelopardalis	06^{h} 47^{m} 46^{s}	+74° 28′ 55″	
2259		Open cluster	Monoceros	06^{h} 38^{m} 32^{s}	+10° 53′ 06″	10.8
2260		Open cluster	Monoceros	06^{h} 38^{m} 03^{s}	−01° 28′ 24″	
2261	Hubble's Variable Nebula	Diffuse nebula	Monoceros	06^{h} 39^{m} 10^{s}	+08° 44′ 09″	9.0
2262		Open cluster	Monoceros	06^{h} 39^{m} 37^{s}	+01° 08′ 49″	
2263		Barred spiral galaxy	Canis Major	06^{h} 38^{m} 29^{s}	−24° 50′ 55″	
2264	Christmas Tree Cluster, Snowflake Cluster and the Fox Fur Nebula.	Open cluster	Monoceros	06^{h} 40^{m} 52^{s}	+09° 52′ 37″	3.9
2265		Open cluster	Gemini	06^{h} 41^{m} 41^{s}	+11° 54′ 18″	
2266		Open cluster	Gemini	06^{h} 43^{m} 20^{s}	+26° 58′ 34″	9.5
2267		Barred lenticular galaxy	Canis Major	06^{h} 40^{m} 52^{s}	−32° 28′ 56″	
2268		Intermediate spiral galaxy	Camelopardalis	07^{h} 14^{m} 17^{s}	+84° 22′ 56″	
2269		Open cluster	Monoceros	06^{h} 43^{m} 16^{s}	+04° 37′ 41″	10.0
2270		Open cluster	Monoceros	06^{h} 43^{m} 57^{s}	+03° 28′ 42″	
2271		Intermediate lenticular galaxy	Canis Major	06^{h} 42^{m} 53^{s}	−23° 28′ 34″	
2272		Intermediate lenticular galaxy	Canis Major	06^{h} 42^{m} 41^{s}	−27° 27′ 34″	11.88
2273		Barred spiral galaxy	Lynx	06^{h} 50^{m} 09^{s}	+60° 50′ 45″	11.6
2274	Adjacent to NGC 2275	Elliptical galaxy	Gemini	06^{h} 47^{m} 17^{s}	+33° 34′ 02″	
2275	Adjacent to NGC 2274	spiral galaxy	Gemini	06^{h} 47^{m} 18^{s}	+33° 35′ 57″	
2276		Intermediate spiral galaxy	Cepheus	07^{h} 27^{m} 15^{s}	+85° 45′ 16″	11.8
2277		Asterism	Gemini	06^{h} 47^{m} 51^{s}	+33° 26′ 18″	
2278	Adjacent to NGC 2279	Double star	Gemini	06^{h} 48^{m} 21^{s}	+33° 24′ 17″	
2279	Adjacent to NGC 2278	Asterism?	Gemini	06^{h} 48^{m} 27^{s}	+33° 24′ 17″	
2280		Unbarred spiral galaxy	Canis Major	06^{h} 44^{m} 49^{s}	−27° 38′ 19″	10.5
2281	Broken Heart Cluster	Open cluster	Auriga	06^{h} 48^{m} 22^{s}	+41° 03′ 36″	5.4
2282		Reflection nebula	Monoceros	06^{h} 46^{m} 51^{s}	+01° 18′ 54″	
2283		Barred spiral galaxy	Canis Major	06^{h} 45^{m} 52.6905^{s}	−18° 12′ 37.22″	11.5
2284		Asterism?	Gemini	06^{h} 49^{m} 08^{s}	+33° 13′ 15″	
2285		Double star	Gemini	06^{h} 49^{m} 26^{s}	+33° 21′ 15″	
2286		Open cluster	Monoceros	06^{h} 47^{m} 40^{s}	−03° 10′ 01″	7.5
2287	Messier 41	Open cluster	Canis Major	06^{h} 46^{m} 00^{s}	−20° 42′ 58″	4.5
2288	Adjacent to NGCs 2289, 2290, 2291, 2294	Galaxy	Gemini	06^{h} 50^{m} 52^{s}	+33° 27′ 45″	
2289	Adjacent to NGCs 2288, 2290, 2291, 2294	Lenticular galaxy	Gemini	06^{h} 50^{m} 54^{s}	+33° 28′ 44″	
2290	Adjacent to NGCs 2288, 2289, 2291, 2294	Unbarred spiral galaxy	Gemini	06^{h} 50^{m} 57^{s}	+33° 26′ 15″	
2291	Adjacent to NGCs 2288, 2289, 2290, 2294	Unbarred lenticular galaxy	Gemini	06^{h} 50^{m} 59^{s}	+33° 31′ 31″	13
2292	Adjacent to NGCs 2293, 2295	Intermediate lenticular galaxy	Canis Major	06^{h} 47^{m} 40^{s}	−26° 44′ 47″	
2293	Adjacent to NGCs 2292, 2295	Intermediate lenticular galaxy	Canis Major	06^{h} 47^{m} 43^{s}	−26° 45′ 16″	11.2
2294	Adjacent to NGCs 2288, 2289, 2290, 2291	Elliptical galaxy	Gemini	06^{h} 51^{m} 11^{s}	+33° 31′ 37″	14
2295	Adjacent to NGCs 2292, 2293	Spiral galaxy	Canis Major	06^{h} 47^{m} 23^{s}	−26° 44′ 11″	
2296		Reflection nebula	Canis Major	06^{h} 48^{m} 39^{s}	−16° 54′ 06″	
2297		Intermediate spiral galaxy	Pictor	06^{h} 44^{m} 25^{s}	−63° 43′ 02″	13.37
2298		Globular cluster	Puppis	06^{h} 48^{m} 59^{s}	−36° 00′ 19″	8.9
2299		Open cluster	Monoceros	06^{h} 51^{m}	−07° 00′	
2300		Lenticular galaxy	Cepheus	07^{h} 32^{m} 20^{s}	+85° 42′ 32″	10.76

== 2301–2400 ==
NGC number	Other names	Object type	Constellation	Right ascension (J2000)	Declination (J2000)	Apparent magnitude
2305		Elliptical galaxy	Volans	06^{h} 37^{m} 37.3714^{s}	−64° 16′ 23.523″	11.7
2315		Lenticular galaxy	Lynx (constellation)	07^{h} 02^{m} 33.0779^{s}	+50° 35′ 25.930″	14.57
2320		Elliptical galaxy	Lynx (constellation)	07^{h} 05^{m} 42.0193^{s}	+50° 34′ 51.648″	12.9
2323	Messier 50	Open cluster	Monoceros	07^{h} 02^{m} 48^{s}	−08° 23′	6.3
2325		Elliptical galaxy	Canis Major	07^{h} 02^{m} 40.4030^{s}	−28° 41′ 50.048″	12.38
2326		Barred spiral galaxy	Lynx	07^{h} 08^{m} 11.0037^{s}	+50° 40′ 54.994″	13.2
2327	IC 2177	Emission nebula	Monoceros	07^{h} 04^{m} 25^{s}	−10° 27′ 18″	15.23
2328		Lenticular galaxy	Puppis	07^{h} 02^{m} 36.193^{s}	−42° 04′ 06.88″	12.55
2336		Spiral galaxy	Camelopardalis	07^{h} 27^{m} 03.7^{s}	+80° 10′ 42″	13.5
2340		Elliptical galaxy	Lynx	07^{h} 11^{m} 10.7950^{s}	+50° 10′ 29.075″	12.7
2342		Spiral galaxy	Gemini	07^{h} 09^{m} 18.08^{s}	+20° 38′ 09.5″	12.6
2346		Planetary nebula	Monoceros	07^{h} 09^{m} 22.5^{s}	−00° 48′ 24″	10.8
2349		Open cluster	Monoceros	07^{h} 11^{m}	−08° 36′	
2353		Open cluster	Monoceros	07^{h} 14^{m} 30.0^{s}	−10° 16′ 00″	7.1
2354		Open cluster	Canis Major	07^{h} 14^{m} 10^{s}	−25° 41.4′	6.5
2355	NGC 2356	Open cluster	Gemini	07^{h} 17.0^{m}	+13° 47′	9.7
2356	(Duplicate of NGC 2355)	Open cluster	Gemini	07^{h} 17.0^{m}	+13° 47′	9.7
2357		Spiral galaxy	Gemini	07^{h} 17^{m} 41^{s}	+23° 21′ 24″	14.0
2359	Thor's Helmet, Gum 4, NGC 2361	Diffuse nebula	Canis Major	07^{h} 18^{m} 30^{s}	−13° 14′	
2360	Caroline's Cluster	Open cluster	Canis Major	07^{h} 18^{m}	−15° 38′	7.6
2361	(Duplicate of NGC 2359)	Diffuse nebula	Canis Major	07^{h} 18^{m} 30^{s}	−13° 14′	
2362	Tau Canis Majoris Cluster	Open cluster	Canis Major	07^{h} 19^{m}	−24° 59′	4.1
2363	(Located within NGC 2366)	Diffuse nebula	Camelopardalis	07^{h} 28^{m} 29.8^{s}	+69° 11′ 33″	15.5
2366		Barred irregular galaxy	Camelopardalis	07^{h} 28^{m} 51.9^{s}	+69° 12′ 31″	11.4
2371	(Duplicate of NGC 2372; also called NGC 2371-2)	Planetary nebula	Gemini	07^{h} 25^{m} 34.7^{s}	+29° 29′ 26″	14.5
2372	(Duplicate of NGC 2371; also called NGC 2371-2)	Open cluster	Gemini	07^{h} 25^{m} 34.7^{s}	+29° 29′ 26″	14.5
2374		Open cluster	Canis Major	07^{h} 25^{m} 54.0^{s}	−13° 16′ 0.0″	8.0
2392		Planetary nebula	Gemini	07^{h} 29^{m} 10.8^{s}	+20° 54′ 42″	10.3
2397		Flocculent spiral galaxy	Volans	07^{h} 21^{m} 19.89194^{s}	−69° 00′ 05.0140″	12.68

== 2401–2500 ==
NGC number	Other names	Object type	Constellation	Right ascension (J2000)	Declination (J2000)	Apparent magnitude
2403		Spiral galaxy	Camelopardalis	07^{h} 36^{m} 50.6^{s}	+65° 36′ 10″	8.9
2404	(Located within NGC 2403)	H II region	Camelopardalis	07^{h} 36^{m} 51.4^{s}	+65° 36′ 09″	16.9
2409		Open cluster	Puppis	07^{h} 32^{m}	−17° 11′	7.5
2415		Irregular galaxy	Gemini	07^{h} 36^{m} 56.7796^{s}	+35° 14′ 30.789″	12.3B
2419		Globular cluster	Lynx	07^{h} 38^{m} 08.5^{s}	+38° 52′ 55″	9.06
2420		Open cluster	Gemini	07^{h} 38^{m} 25^{s}	+21° 34′ 20″	8.3
2422	Messier 47	Open cluster	Puppis	07^{h} 37^{m}	−14° 29′	4.4
2427		Barred spiral galaxy	Puppis	07^{h} 36^{m} 28.035^{s}	−47° 38′ 11.05″	11.6
2437	Messier 46	Open cluster	Puppis	07^{h} 42^{m}	−14° 49′	6.3
2438		Planetary nebula	Puppis	07^{h} 41^{m} 51.4^{s}	−14° 43′ 55″	10.8
2439		Open cluster	Puppis	07^{h} 40^{m} 45.0^{s}	31° 41′ 36″	6.9
2440		Planetary nebula	Puppis	07^{h} 41^{m} 54.9^{s}	−18° 12′ 30″	18.9
2442		Spiral galaxy	Volans	07^{h} 36^{m} 23.9^{s}	−69° 31′ 47″	11.2
2443	(Duplicate of NGC 2442)	Spiral galaxy	Volans	07^{h} 36^{m} 23.9^{s}	−69° 31′ 47″	11.2
2444		Interacting galaxy	Lynx	07^{h} 46^{m} 53.0^{s}	39° 01′ 55″	12.9
2445		Interacting galaxy	Lynx	07^{h} 46^{m} 55.1^{s}	39° 00′ 55″	13.0
2446		Spiral galaxy	Lynx	07^{h} 48^{m} 39.2173^{s}	+54° 36′ 42.570″	13.73
2447	Messier 93	Open cluster	Puppis	07^{h} 45^{m}	−23° 52′	6.6
2451		Open cluster	Puppis	07^{h} 45^{m}	−37° 58′	10.0
2452		Planetary nebula	Puppis	07^{h} 47^{m} 26.27^{s}	−27° 20′ 06.6″	17.9B
2460		Spiral galaxy	Camelopardalis	07^{h} 56^{m} 52.4^{s}	+60° 20′ 57″	12.5
2466		Spiral galaxy	Volans	07^{h} 45^{m} 16.05^{s}	−71° 24′ 37.5″	13.0
2467	Skull and Crossbones Nebula	Star-forming region	Puppis	07^{h} 52^{m} 24.22^{s}	−26° 24′ 58.40″	
2477		Open cluster	Puppis	07^{h} 52^{m}	−38° 32′	6.6
2478	Messier 47	Open cluster	Puppis	07^{h} 36.6^{m}	−14° 30′	4.4
2484		Lenticular galaxy	Lynx	07^{h} 58^{m} 28.1081^{s}	+37° 47′ 11.808″	14.9
2485		Spiral galaxy	Canis Minor	07^{h} 56^{m} 48.662^{s}	+07° 28′ 40.55″	13.3
2491		Spiral galaxy	Canis Minor	07^{h} 58^{m} 27.4^{s}	+07° 59′ 02″	15.6
2494		Barred lenticular galaxy	Monoceros	07^{h} 59^{m} 07.1188^{s}	−00° 38′ 16.626″	13.4
2500		Spiral galaxy	Lynx	08^{h} 01^{m} 53.2^{s}	+50° 44′ 13″	12.3

== 2501–2600 ==
NGC number	Other names	Object type	Constellation	Right ascension (J2000)	Declination (J2000)	Apparent magnitude
2503		Spiral galaxy	Cancer	08^{h} 00^{m} 36.7^{s}	22° 24′ 00″	14.4
2506	Caldwell 54	Open cluster	Monoceros	08^{h} 00^{m} 01.0^{s}	−10° 46′ 12″	7.6
2509		Open cluster	Puppis	08^{h} 00^{m} 48^{s}	−19° 03′ 06″	9.3
2516		Open cluster	Carina	07^{h} 58^{m}	−60° 45′	3.8
2520	(Duplicate of NGC 2527)	Open cluster	Puppis	08^{h} 04^{m} 58^{s}	−28° 08′ 48″	6.5
2523		Barred spiral galaxy	Camelopardalis	08^{h} 15^{m} 00.193^{s}	+73° 34′ 44.167″	10.2
2525		Barred spiral galaxy	Puppis	08^{h} 05^{m} 38^{s}	−11° 25′ 37″	11.6
2527	NGC 2520	Open cluster	Puppis	08^{h} 04^{m} 58^{s}	−28° 08′ 48″	6.5
2528		Intermediate spiral galaxy	Lynx	08^{h} 07^{m} 24.8334^{s}	+39° 11′ 40.097″	12.6
2532		Barred spiral galaxy	Lynx	08^{h} 10^{m} 15.1840^{s}	+33° 57′ 23.757″	13.5g
2535		Spiral galaxy	Cancer	08^{h} 11^{m} 13.6^{s}	+25° 12′ 24″	13.0
2536		Spiral galaxy	Cancer	08^{h} 11^{m} 16.1^{s}	+25° 10′ 45″	14.5
2537	Bear's Paw Galaxy	Irregular galaxy	Lynx	08^{h} 13^{m} 14.6^{s}	+45° 59′ 30″	11.7
2539		Open cluster	Puppis	08^{h} 10^{m} 37^{s}	−12° 49′ 06″	6.5
2541		Spiral galaxy	Lynx	08^{h} 14^{m} 40.4^{s}	+49° 03′ 42″	13.0
2545		Barred spiral galaxy	Cancer	08^{h} 14^{m} 14.1505^{s}	+21° 21′ 19.658″	13.4g
2546		Open cluster	Puppis	08^{h} 12^{m}	−37° 37′	6.5
2547		Open cluster	Vela	08^{h} 10^{m} 25.7^{s}	−49° 10′ 03″	4.8
2548	Messier 48	Open cluster	Hydra	08^{h} 14^{m}	−05° 45′	6.1
2549		Lenticular galaxy	Lynx	08^{h} 18^{m} 58.4^{s}	+57° 48′ 10″	12.1
2550		Spiral galaxy	Camelopardalis	08^{h} 24^{m} 33.9^{s}	+74° 00′ 43″	13.1
2550A		Spiral galaxy	Camelopardalis	08^{h} 28^{m} 39.9646^{s}	+73° 44′ 53.423″	12.7
2551		Spiral galaxy	Camelopardalis	08^{h} 24^{m} 50.5^{s}	+73° 24′ 44″	12.7
2552		Irregular galaxy	Lynx	08^{h} 19^{m} 19.6^{s}	+50° 00′ 28″	13.5
2556		Lenticular galaxy	Cancer	08^{h} 19^{m} 00^{s}	+20° 56′ 13″	15.1
2558		Spiral galaxy	Cancer	08^{h} 19^{m} 12.7681^{s}	+20° 30′ 38.337″	13
2560		Lenticular galaxy	Cancer	08^{h} 19^{m} 51.893^{s}	+20° 56′ 5.94″	14.9
2563		Lenticular galaxy	Cancer	08^{h} 20^{m} 35.6916^{s}	+21° 04′ 4.185″	12.39
2565		Barred spiral galaxy	Cancer	08^{h} 19^{m} 48.3092^{s}	+22° 01′ 53.087″	12.6
2566		Barred spiral galaxy	Puppis	08^{h} 18^{m} 45.6034^{s}	−25° 29′ 58.053″	11.0
2573	Polarissima Australis	Barred spiral galaxy	Octans	01^{h} 41^{m} 38.0019^{s}	−89° 20′ 04.2723″	13.25 ± 0.09
2595		Spiral galaxy	Cancer	08^{h} 27^{m} 42.0377^{s}	+21° 28′ 44.812″	13.7
2599		Spiral galaxy	Cancer	08^{h} 32^{m} 11.3248^{s}	+22° 33′ 37.967″	13.08

== 2601–2700 ==
NGC number	Other names	Object type	Constellation	Right ascension (J2000)	Declination (J2000)	Apparent magnitude
2603		Spiral galaxy	Ursa Major	08^{h} 34^{m} 31.1937^{s}	+52° 50′ 24.771″	15.67
2606		Spiral galaxy	Ursa Major	08^{h} 35^{m} 34.5^{s}	+52° 47′ 20″	17.02
2608		Barred spiral galaxy	Cancer	08^{h} 17^{m} 0.3^{s}	+28° 28′ 22″	13.01
2613		Spiral galaxy	Pyxis	08^{h} 33^{m} 22.841^{s}	−22° 58′ 25.21″	11.6
2617		Spiral galaxy	Hydra	08^{h} 35^{m} 38.798^{s}	−04° 05′ 17.9″	12.66
2623		Interacting galaxy	Cancer	08^{h} 38^{m} 24.1^{s}	+25° 45′ 01.0″	13.36
2626		Reflection nebula; emission nebula; absorption nebula	Vela	08^{h} 35^{m} 32^{s}	−40° 40′ 18″	
2627		Open cluster	Pyxis	08^{h} 37^{m} 14.2^{s}	−29° 57′ 07″	8.4
2632	Messier 44; Beehive Cluster; Praesepe Cluster	Open cluster	Cancer	08^{h} 40^{m}	+19° 41′	3.2
2642		Barred spiral galaxy	Hydra	08^{h} 44^{m} 37.0^{s}	−04° 07′ 18.2″	12.6
2648		Unbarred spiral galaxy	Cancer	08^{h} 42^{m} 39^{s}	+14° 17′ 08″	11.82
2652	(Duplicate of NGC 2974)	Lenticular galaxy	Sextans	09^{h} 42^{m} 33^{s}	−03° 41′ 57″	10.9
2655		Lenticular galaxy	Camelopardalis	08^{h} 55^{m} 37.7^{s}	+78° 13′ 03″	10.1
2659		Open cluster	Vela	08^{h} 42^{m} 36^{s}	−44° 59′ 00″	8.6
2663	PGC 24590	Elliptical galaxy	Pyxis	08^{h} 45^{m} 08.144^{s}	−33° 47′ 41.06″	12.33
2672	Arp 167	Elliptical galaxy	Cancer	08^{h} 49^{m} 21.8884^{s}	+19° 04′ 29.947″	11.7
2681		Lenticular galaxy	Ursa Major	08^{h} 52^{m} 32.7^{s}	51° 18′ 49″	11.1
2682	Messier 67; King Cobra Cluster; Golden Eye Cluster	Open cluster	Cancer	08^{h} 51.3^{m}	+11° 49′	6.1
2683		Spiral galaxy	Lynx	8^{h} 52^{m} 41.7^{s}	+33° 25′ 10″	9.7
2685	Helix Galaxy	Polar ring Seyfert galaxy	Ursa Major	08^{h} 55^{m} 34.7287^{s}	+58° 44′ 03.908″	11.3
2688		Spiral galaxy	Ursa Major	08^{h} 55^{m} 11.606^{s}	+49° 07′ 21.46″	15.8
2692		Spiral galaxy	Ursa Major	08^{h} 56^{m} 58.20^{s}	+52° 03′ 55.0″	13.3
2697		Lenticular galaxy	Hydra	08^{h} 54^{m} 59.4027^{s}	−02° 59′ 15.016″	12.6

== 2701–2800 ==
NGC number	Other names	Object type	Constellation	Right ascension (J2000)	Declination (J2000)	Apparent magnitude
2708	NGC 2727	Spiral galaxy	Hydra	08^{h} 56^{m} 08.05^{s}	−03° 21′ 36.4″	12.0
2715		Spiral galaxy	Camelopardalis	09^{h} 08^{m} 06.1^{s}	+78° 05′ 07″	11.9
2719	Arp 202	Irregular galaxy	Lynx	09^{h} 00^{m} 15.4773^{s}	+35° 43′ 40.594″	13.1
2721		Barred spiral galaxy	Hydra	08^{h} 58^{m} 56.5367^{s}	−04° 54′ 06.677″	12.5
2736	Pencil Nebula	Diffuse nebula	Vela	09^{h} 00^{m}	−45° 57′	+12.0?
2748		Spiral galaxy	Camelopardalis	09^{h} 13^{m} 43.037^{s}	+76° 28′ 31.23″	11.7
2758		Spiral galaxy	Hydra	09^{h} 05^{m} 31.2317^{s}	−19° 02′ 33.632″	13.4
2768		Lenticular galaxy	Ursa Major	09^{h} 11^{m} 37.5^{s}	60° 02′ 14″	9.9
2770	Supernova Factory	Spiral galaxy	Lynx	09^{h} 09^{m} 33.7^{s}	+33° 07′ 25″	12.0
2775		Spiral galaxy	Cancer	09^{h} 10^{m} 20.1^{s}	+07° 02′ 18″	11.4
2782		Peculiar spiral galaxy	Lynx	08^{h} 53^{m} 32.7^{s}	51° 18′ 49″	12.3
2787		Lenticular galaxy	Ursa Major	09^{h} 19^{m} 18.9^{s}	+69° 12′ 12″	11.7
2797		Intermediate spiral galaxy	Cancer	09^{h} 16^{m} 21.6700^{s}	+17° 43′ 37.965″	14.6g
2798		Spiral galaxy	Lynx	09^{h} 17^{m} 23.0^{s}	+41° 59′ 58″	13.2
2792		Planetary nebula	Vela	09^{h} 12^{m} 26^{s}	−42° 25′ 39″	11.6
2798		Barred spiral galaxy	Lynx	09^{h} 17^{m} 22^{s}	+41° 59′ 58″	12.32
2799		Irregular galaxy	Lynx	09^{h} 17^{m} 31.2^{s}	+41° 59′ 36″	14.4
2800		Elliptical galaxy	Ursa Major	09^{h} 18^{m} 35.164^{s}	+52° 30′ 52.49″	

== 2801–2900 ==
NGC number	Other names	Object type	Constellation	Right ascension (J2000)	Declination (J2000)	Apparent magnitude
2801		Unbarred spiral galaxy	Cancer	09^{h} 16^{m} 44.2063^{s}	+19° 56′ 08.535″	
2803		Elliptical or lenticular galaxy	Cancer	09^{h} 16^{m} 43.86892^{s}	+18° 57′ 16.4866″	15.16
2804	IC 2455	Lenticular galaxy	Cancer	09^{h} 16^{m} 50.0119^{s}	+20° 11′ 54.611″	12.8
2805		Intermediate spiral galaxy	Ursa Major	09^{h} 20^{m} 20.41^{s}	+64° 06′ 10.0″	11.0
2808		Globular cluster	Carina	09^{h} 12^{m} 02.6^{s}	−64° 51′ 46″	7.8
2809		Lenticular galaxy	Cancer	9^{h} 18^{m} 33^{s}	+19° 57′ 43″	
2812		Lenticular galaxy/Spiral galaxy	Cancer	09^{h} 17^{m} 40.8^{s}	+19° 55′ 08″	15.7
2813		Lenticular galaxy	Cancer	09^{h} 17^{m} 45.4^{s}	+19° 54′ 24″	12.4
2814		Spiral galaxy	Ursa Major	09^{h} 21^{m} 11.4079^{s}	+64° 15′ 12.499″	13.7
2818		Planetary nebula	Pyxis	09^{h} 16^{m} 01.7^{s}	−36° 37′ 39″	12.5
2818a		Open cluster	Pyxis			
2830		Lenticular galaxy	Lynx	09^{h} 19^{m} 41.3932^{s}	+33° 44′ 16.962″	13.9
2832		Elliptical galaxy	Lynx	09^{h} 19^{m} 46.9^{s}	+33° 44′ 59″	11.8
2835		Intermediate spiral galaxy	Hydra	09^{h} 17^{m} 52.7877^{s}	−22° 21′ 16.130″	10.3
2841		Spiral galaxy	Ursa Major	09^{h} 22^{m} 02.0^{s}	+50° 58′ 40″	9.9
2847	(Duplicate of NGC 2848)	Intermediate spiral galaxy	Hydra	09^{h} 20^{m} 09.83^{s}	−16° 31′ 33.8″	11.8
2848	NGC 2847	Intermediate spiral galaxy	Hydra	09^{h} 20^{m} 09.83^{s}	−16° 31′ 33.8″	11.8
2857	Arp 1	Spiral galaxy	Ursa Major	09^{h} 24^{m} 37.698^{s}	+49° 21′ 25.69″	12.27
2859		Lenticular galaxy	Leo Minor	09^{h} 24^{m} 18.7^{s}	+34° 30′ 49″	11.8
2865		Elliptical galaxy	Hydra	09^{h} 23^{m} 30^{s}	−23° 09′ 41″	11.43
2867		Planetary nebula	Carina	09^{h} 21^{m} 25.4^{s}	−58° 18′ 401″	12.0
2890		Lenticular galaxy	Hydra	09^{h} 26^{m} 29.84^{s}	−14° 31′ 43.3″	14.5
2899		Planetary nebula	Vela	09^{h} 27^{m} 03.2^{s}	−56° 06′ 21.1″	12.0

== 2901–3000 ==
NGC number	Other names	Object type	Constellation	Right ascension (J2000)	Declination (J2000)	Apparent magnitude
2903	NGC 2905	Spiral galaxy	Leo	09^{h} 32^{m} 09.7^{s}	+21° 30′ 03″	9.8
2905	(Duplicate of NGC 2903)	Spiral galaxy	Leo	09^{h} 32^{m} 09.7^{s}	+21° 30′ 03″	9.8
2906		Spiral galaxy	Leo	09^{h} 32^{m} 06.2^{s}	+08° 26′ 30″	12.5
2911		Peculiar lenticular galaxy	Leo	09^{h} 33^{m} 46.1^{s}	+10° 09′ 09″	11.5
2915		Irregular galaxy	Chamaeleon	09^{h} 26^{m} 11.5^{s}	−76° 37′ 35″	13.2
2927		Barred spiral galaxy	Leo	09^{h} 37^{m} 15.1961^{s}	+23° 35′ 26.199″	12.9
2930		Spiral galaxy	Leo	09^{h} 37^{m} 32.7600^{s}	+23° 12′ 10.000″	15.10
2935		Spiral galaxy	Hydra	09^{h} 36^{m} 44.6^{s}	−21° 07′ 41″	10.9
2936		Interacting galaxy	Hydra	09^{h} 37^{m} 44.148^{s}	+02° 45′ 38.95″	12.85
2937		Elliptical galaxy	Hydra	09^{h} 37^{m} 45^{s}	+02° 44′ 50″	13.66
2939		Spiral galaxy	Leo	09^{h} 38^{m} 08.0700^{s}	+09° 31′ 17.500″	13.15
2950		Lenticular galaxy	Ursa Major	09^{h} 42^{m} 35.116^{s}	58° 51′ 04.39″	
2959		Spiral galaxy	Ursa Major	09^{h} 45^{m} 8.969^{s}	+68° 35′ 40.48″	12.8
2962		Lenticular galaxy	Hydra	09^{h} 40^{m} 53.9396^{s}	+05° 09′ 57.025″	12.0
2964		Spiral galaxy	Leo	09^{h} 42^{m} 54.2^{s}	+31° 50′ 49″	12.0
2967		Spiral galaxy	Sextans	09^{h} 42^{m} 03.3401^{s}	+00° 20′ 10.837″	12.30
2968		Irregular galaxy	Leo	09^{h} 43^{m} 12.1^{s}	+31° 55′ 42″	13.1
2972		Open cluster	Vela	09^{h} 40^{m} 28.5^{s}	−50° 20′ 10″	10.7
2974	NGC 2652	Lenticular galaxy	Sextans	09^{h} 42^{m} 33^{s}	−03° 41′ 57″	10.9
2976		Spiral galaxy	Ursa Major	09^{h} 47^{m} 15.5^{s}	+67° 55′ 03″	10.9
2980		Intermediate spiral galaxy	Sextans	09^{h} 43^{m} 11.9880^{s}	−09° 36′ 44.820″	13.6
2985		Spiral galaxy	Ursa Major	09^{h} 50^{m} 22.2^{s}	+72° 16′ 43″	10.4
2986		Elliptical galaxy	Hydra	09^{h} 44^{m} 16.0188^{s}	−21° 16′ 40.924″	11.72
2992		Seyfert galaxy	Hydra	09^{h} 45^{m} 42.045^{s}	−14° 19′ 34.90″	12.2
2997		Spiral galaxy	Antlia	09^{h} 45^{m} 38.7^{s}	−31° 11′ 25″	10.3
2998		Spiral galaxy	Ursa Major	09^{h} 48^{m} 43.6^{s}	+44° 04′ 51″	13.3
2999	(Duplicate of NGC 2972)	Open cluster	Vela	09^{h} 40^{m} 28.5^{s}	−50° 20′ 10″	10.7
3000		Double star	Ursa Major	09^{h} 49^{m}	+44° 08′	10.88

== See also ==
- Lists of astronomical objects
