= NGC 2603 =

Compact galaxy located in the constellation Ursa Major

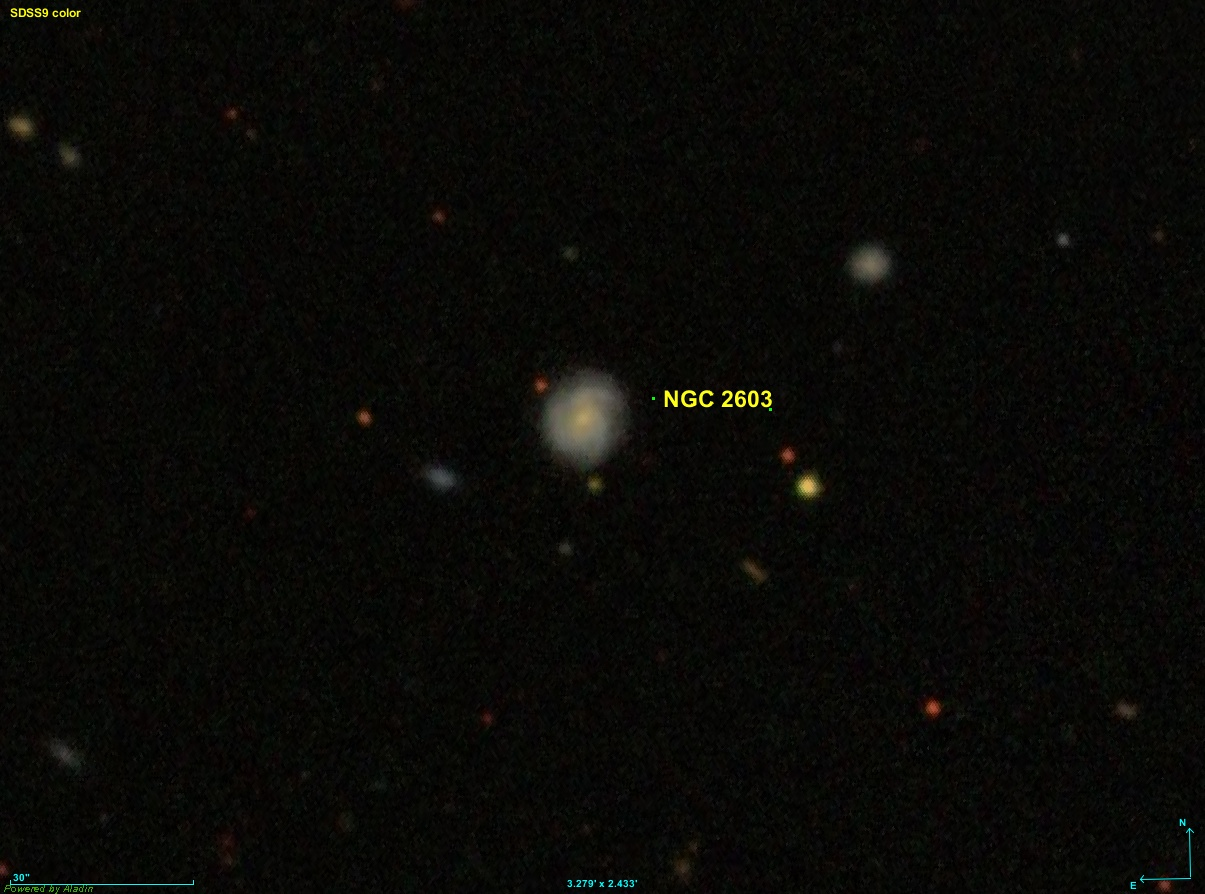

Observation data (J2000 epoch)
- Constellation: Ursa Major
- Right ascension: 08^{h} 34^{m} 31.2217^{s}
- Declination: +52° 50′ 24.728″
- Redshift: 0.057074
- Distance: 787 Mly (241 Mpc)

Characteristics
- Type: Sb
- Size: 81,000 ly

Other designations
- PGC 3133653, SDSS J083431.19+525024.8

NGC 2603 is a small compact spiral galaxy located 787 million light-years away in the constellation of Ursa Major from the Solar System. It was discovered by George Johnstone Stoney, an Irish astronomer, on February 9, 1850. NGC 2603 has an estimated diameter of 81,000 light-years. It contains a narrow-line active galactic nucleus. The Hyperleda database associates NGC 2603 and NGC 2606 as one single galaxy. NASA/IPAC database on the other hand, classifies NGC 2603 as galaxy PGC 3133653.
