= NGC 2202 =

Open cluster in the constellation Orion

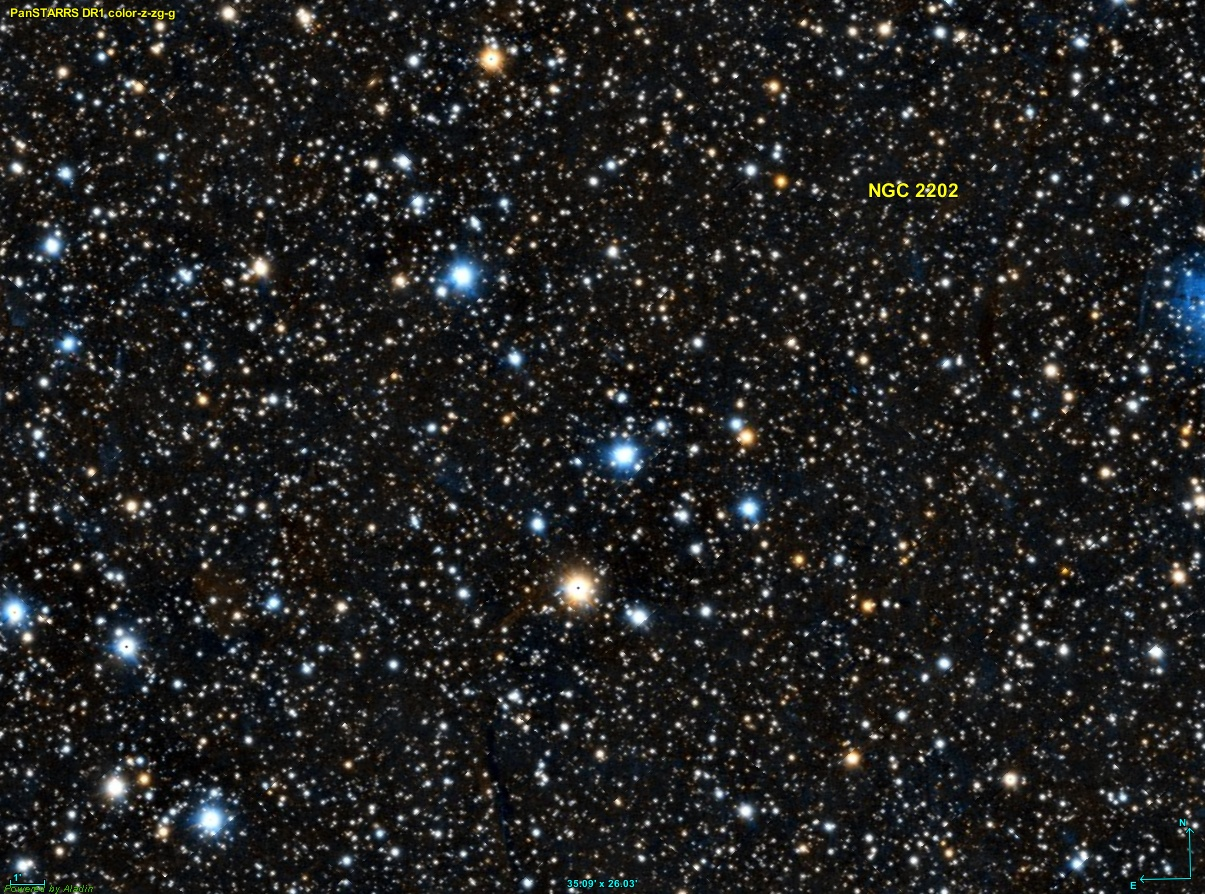
- NGC 2202 (Pan-STARRS)

Observation data (J2000 epoch)
- Right ascension: 06^{h} 16^{m} 54.0^{s}
- Declination: +06° 00′ 00″
- Distance: 2,900 ly (900 pc)
- Apparent dimensions (V): 7.2′

Physical characteristics

Associations
- Constellation: Orion

NGC 2202 is an open cluster in the constellation Orion. The object was discovered in 1825 by the German-Russian astronomer Friedrich Georg Wilhelm von Struve.

== See also ==
- List of NGC objects (2001–3000)
