= NGC 2291 =

Lenticular galaxy in the constellation Gemini

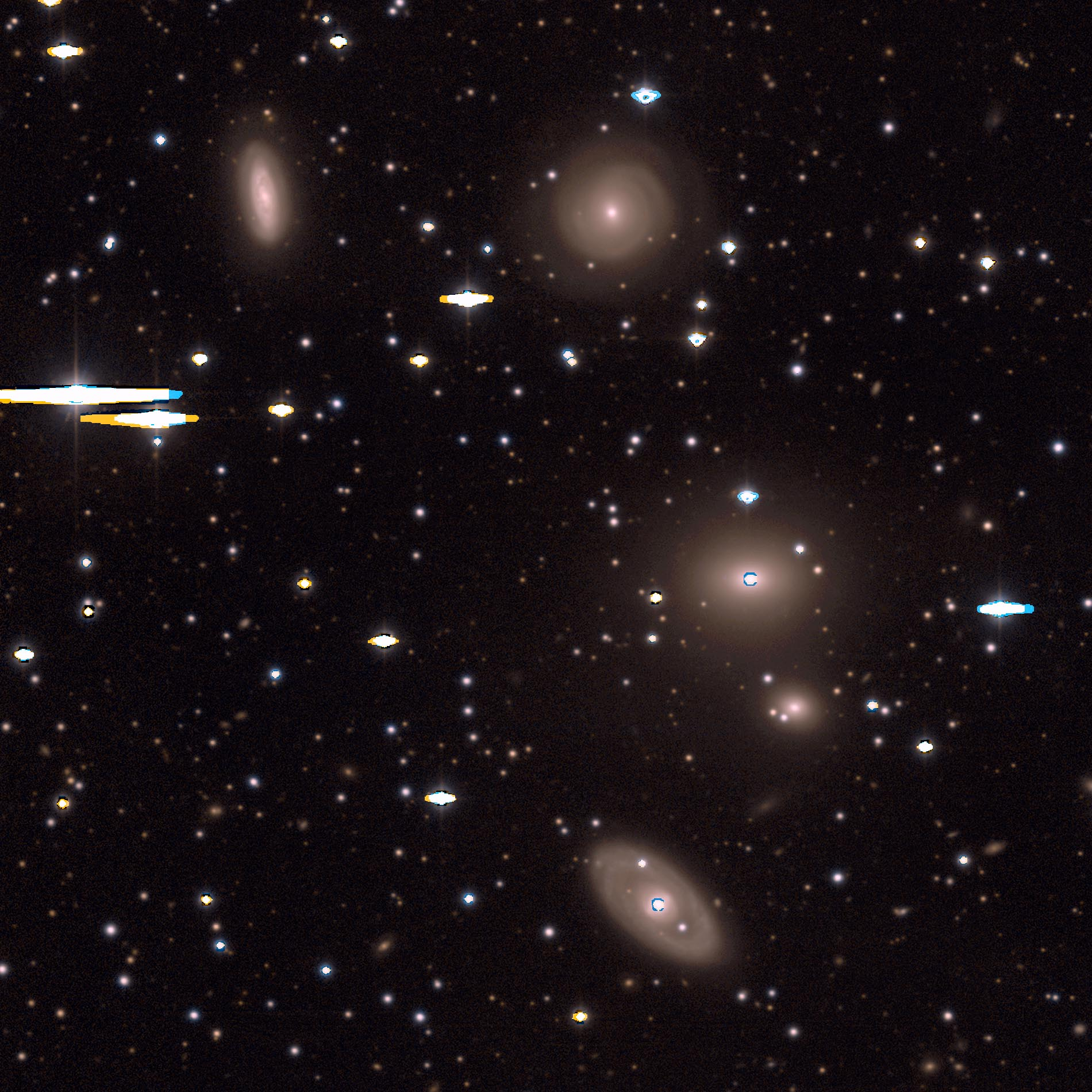
- NGC 2291 is at the top middle of the image. Also in this image: NGC 2288, NGC 2289, NGC 2290 and NGC 2294. Image is from the legacy surveys

Observation data (J2000 epoch)
- Constellation: Gemini
- Right ascension: 06^{h} 50^{m} 58.6^{s}
- Declination: 33° 31′ 30″
- Redshift: 0.017362
- Heliocentric radial velocity: 5205 km/s

Characteristics
- Type: SA0^{0}

Other designations
- MCG +06-15-013, PGC 19719

NGC 2291 is an unbarred lenticular galaxy in the constellation Gemini. It was discovered by John Herschel on January 22, 1827. The visual magnitude is 13, and the apparent size is 1.0 by 0.8 arc minutes.
