= NGC 2263 =

Galaxy located in the constellation Canis Major

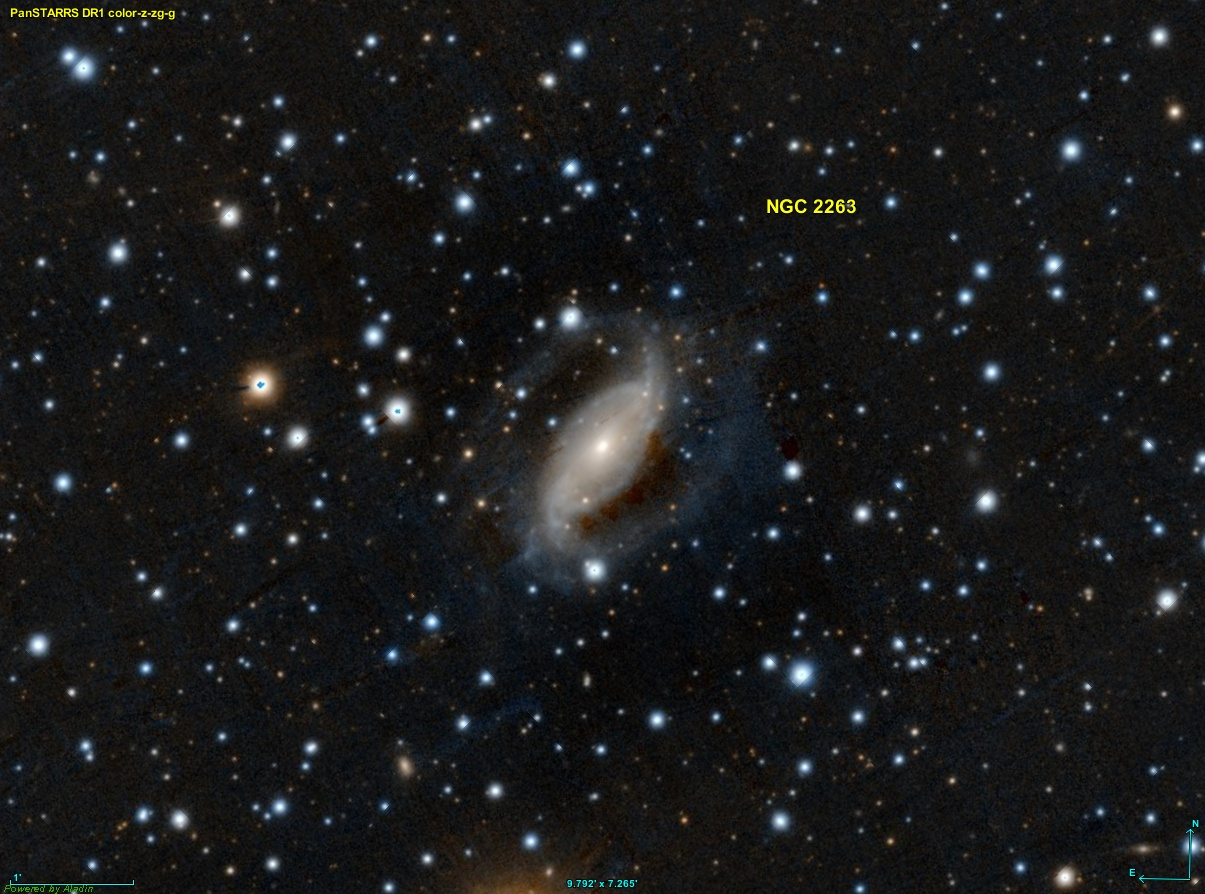
- NGC 2263 captured by Pan-STARRS

Observation data
- Constellation: Canis Major
- Right ascension: 06^{h} 38^{m} 28.8^{s}
- Declination: −24° 50′ 55″
- Apparent magnitude (V): 12.1

Characteristics
- Type: (R)SB(r)ab
- Apparent size (V): 2′.6 × 1′.6

Other designations
- ESO 490-25, MCG -04-16-015, PGC 19339

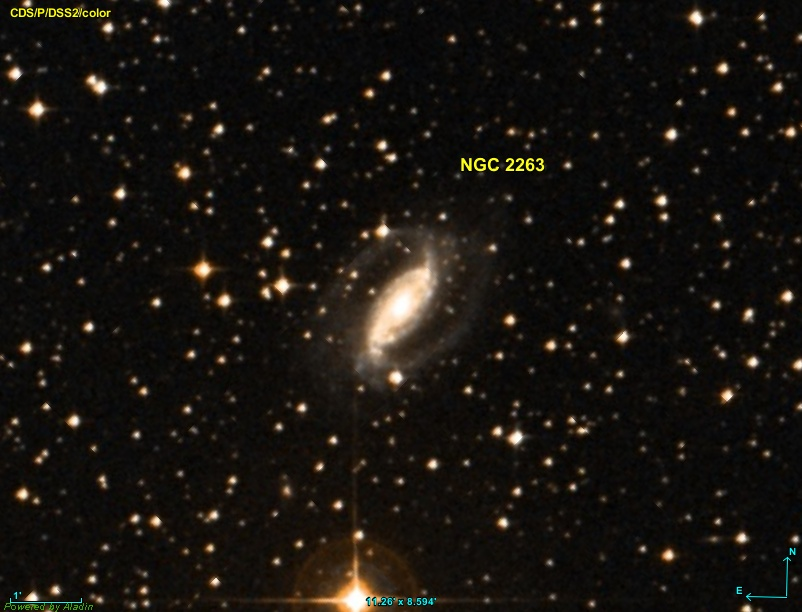
An image of the barred spiral galaxy NGC 2263.

NGC 2263 is a barred spiral galaxy located in the constellation Canis Major. It was discovered by the British astronomer John Herschel on January 20, 1835.
