= NGC 2800 =

Elliptical galaxy in the constellation Ursa Major

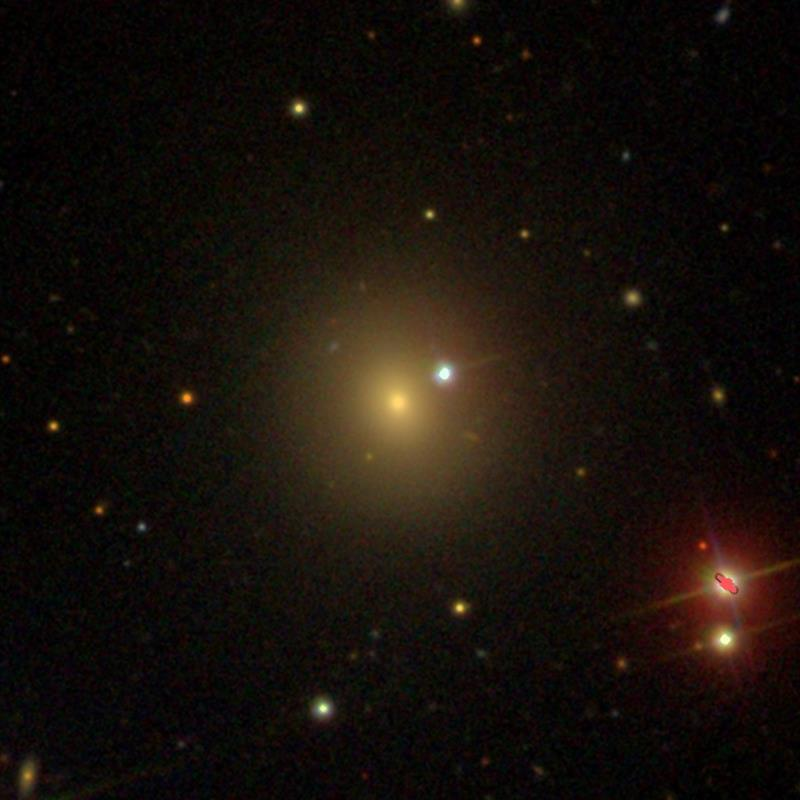
- SDSS image of NGC 2800

Observation data (J2000 epoch)
- Constellation: Ursa Major
- Right ascension: 09^{h} 18^{m} 35.164^{s}
- Declination: +52° 30′ 52.49″
- Redshift: 0.025338
- Heliocentric radial velocity: 7500 km/s
- Distance: 374.4 ± 26.3 Mly (114.80 ± 8.05 Mpc)
- Apparent magnitude (B): 14.0

Characteristics
- Type: E

Other designations
- UGC 4920, MCG +09-15-117, PGC 26302

NGC 2800, also known as PGC 26302, is an elliptical galaxy in the constellation Ursa Major. It was discovered February 17, 1831 by William Herschel.
