= NGC 2108 =

Globular cluster in the constellation Dorado

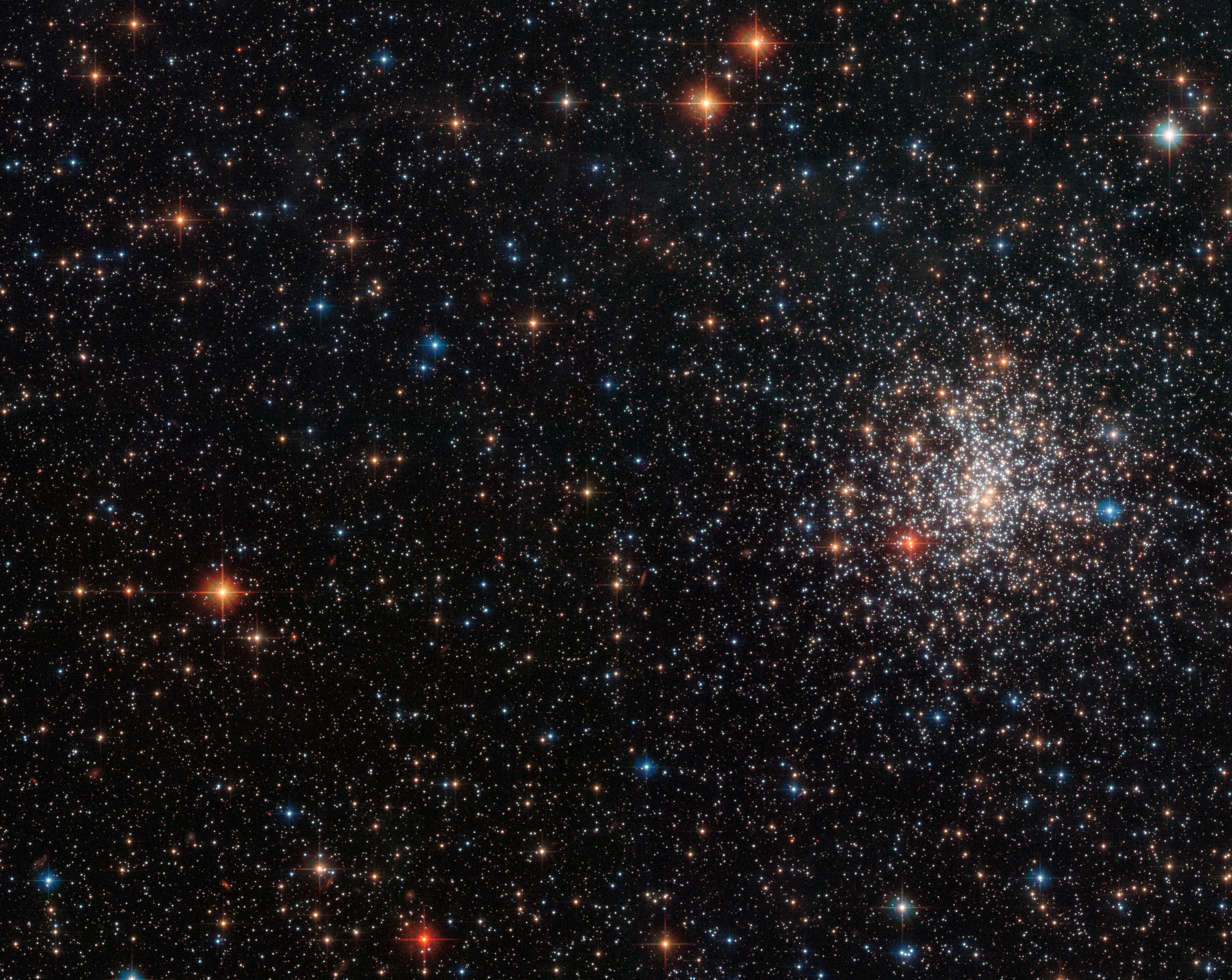
- NGC 2108 taken by Hubble Space Telescope.

Observation data (J2000 epoch)
- Constellation: Dorado
- Right ascension: 05^{h} 43^{m} 56.270^{s}
- Declination: −69° 10′ 54.37″
- Distance: 150,000 light years
- Apparent magnitude (V): 12.32

Physical characteristics
- Other designations: ESO 57-33, KMHK 1304, [SL63] 686

NGC 2108 is a globular cluster located in the constellation of Dorado. NGC 2108 was discovered in 1835 by John Herschel.

== See also ==
- Globular Cluster
