= NGC 2010 =

Star cluster in the constellation Mensa

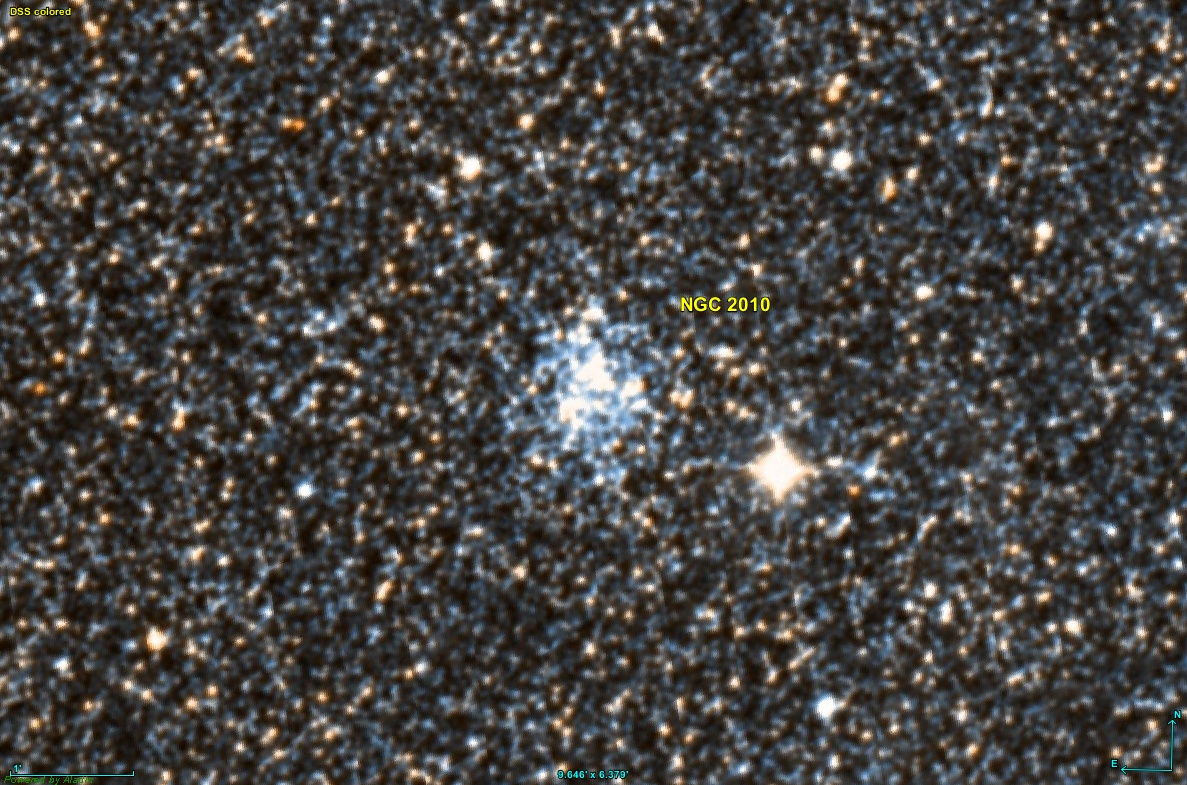
- The open cluster NGC 2010

Observation data (J2000 epoch)
- Right ascension: 05^{h} 30^{m} 16^{s}
- Declination: −70° 48′ 05″
- Apparent magnitude (V): 11.7

Physical characteristics

Associations
- Constellation: Mensa

NGC 2010 (also known as ESO 056-SC319) is a small open cluster located in the constellation Mensa. It was discovered by British astronomer John Herschel on November 12, 1836 and has a visual magnitude of 11.7, being visible with a telescope having an aperture of 8 inches (200mm) or more. It is located in the Large Magellanic Cloud and is estimated to be between 75 and 80 light years across.
