= NGC 2025 =

Star cluster in the constellation Mensa

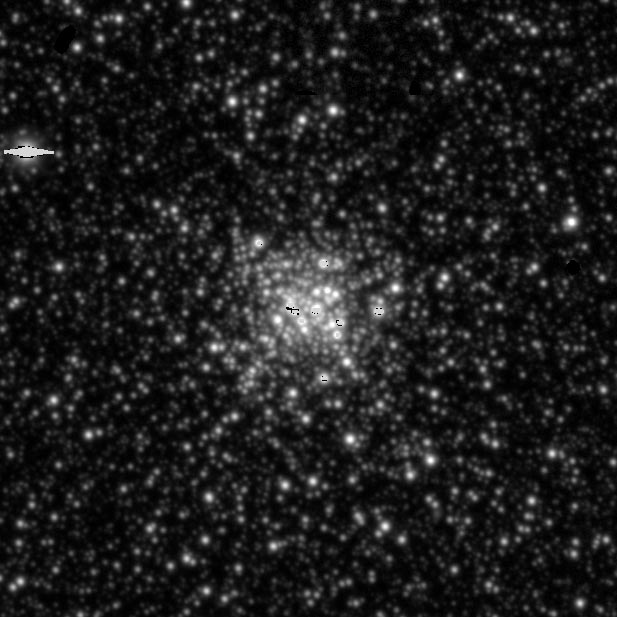
- The open cluster NGC 2025

Observation data (J2000 epoch)
- Right ascension: 05^{h} 32^{m} 33.64^{s}
- Declination: −71° 42′ 55.80″
- Apparent magnitude (V): 10.94

Physical characteristics

Associations
- Constellation: Mensa

NGC 2025 (also known as ESO 56-149) is a small open cluster located in the constellation Mensa. It was discovered by British astronomer John Herschel on February 8, 1836. NGC 2025 is situated south of the celestial equator and, as such, is more easily visible from the southern hemisphere with a visual magnitude of 10.94. NGC 2025 is visible with the help of a telescope having an aperture of 6 inches (150mm) or more and is located in the Large Magellanic Cloud with an angular size of 1.90 arcminutes.
