= NGC 2302 =

Open cluster in the constellation Monoceros

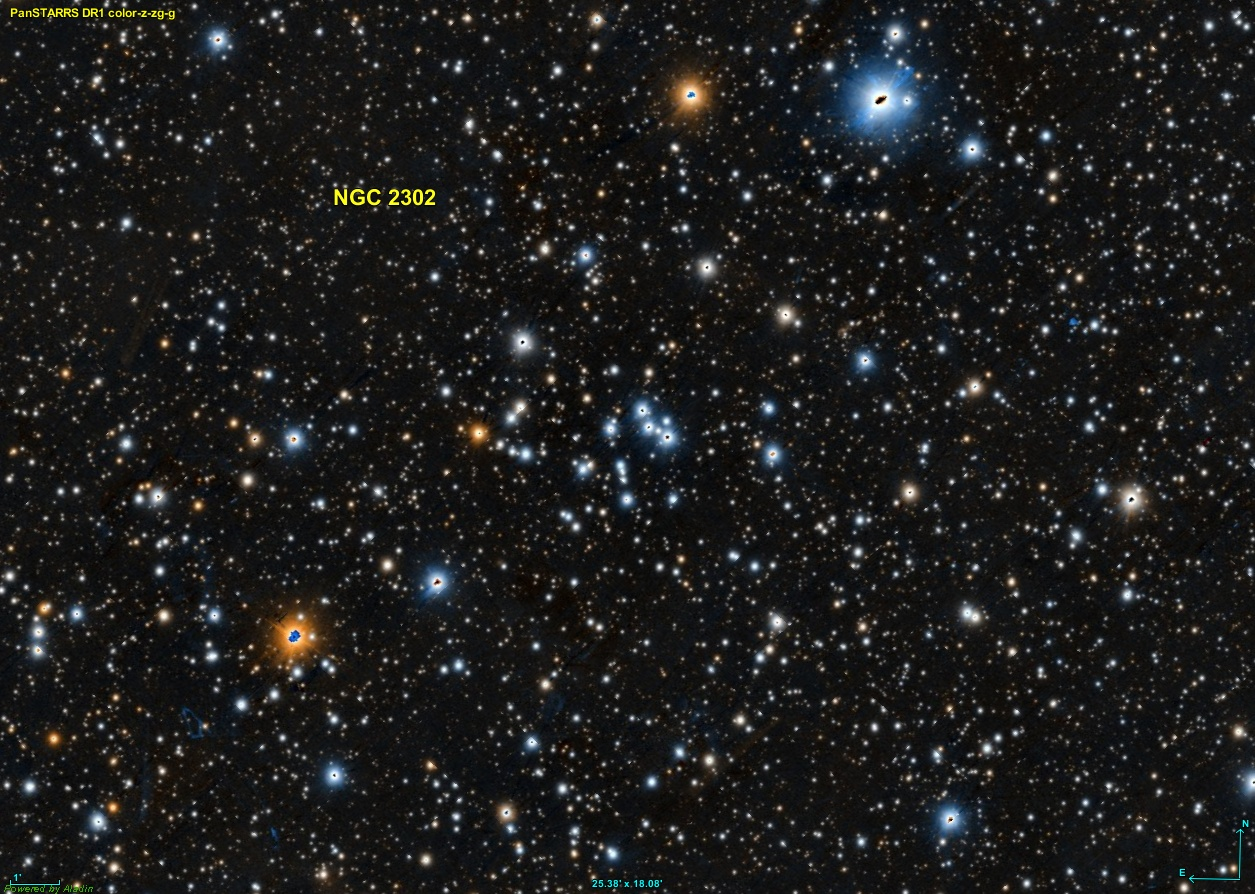
- NGC 2302 imaged by Pan-STARRS

Observation data
- Right ascension: 06^{h} 51^{m} 53.67^{s}
- Declination: −07° 04′ 54.8″
- Distance: 3.78 ± 0.26 kly (1.16 ± 0.08 kpc)
- Apparent dimensions (V): 30′

Physical characteristics
- Mass: 333±48 M_{☉}
- Radius: 17 ly (5.1 pc)
- Estimated age: 80 ± 20 Myr

Associations
- Constellation: Monoceros

NGC 2302 (also called NGC 2299) is an open cluster in the constellation Monoceros. It was discovered on March 4, 1785, by William Herschel (and later listed as NGC 2302) and separately on January 19, 1828 by John Herschel (and later listed as NGC 2299).

A low-mass open cluster, NGC 2302 has a stellar mass of about 333 times that of the Sun. NGC 2302 is about 80 million years old. Based on Gaia parallaxes, NGC 2302 is about 3,800 light-years (1,160 parsecs) away from the Sun. With an apparent radius of 15′, this corresponds to a physical radius of about 17 light-years (5.1 parsecs).
