= NGC 2812 =

Galaxy in the constellation Cancer

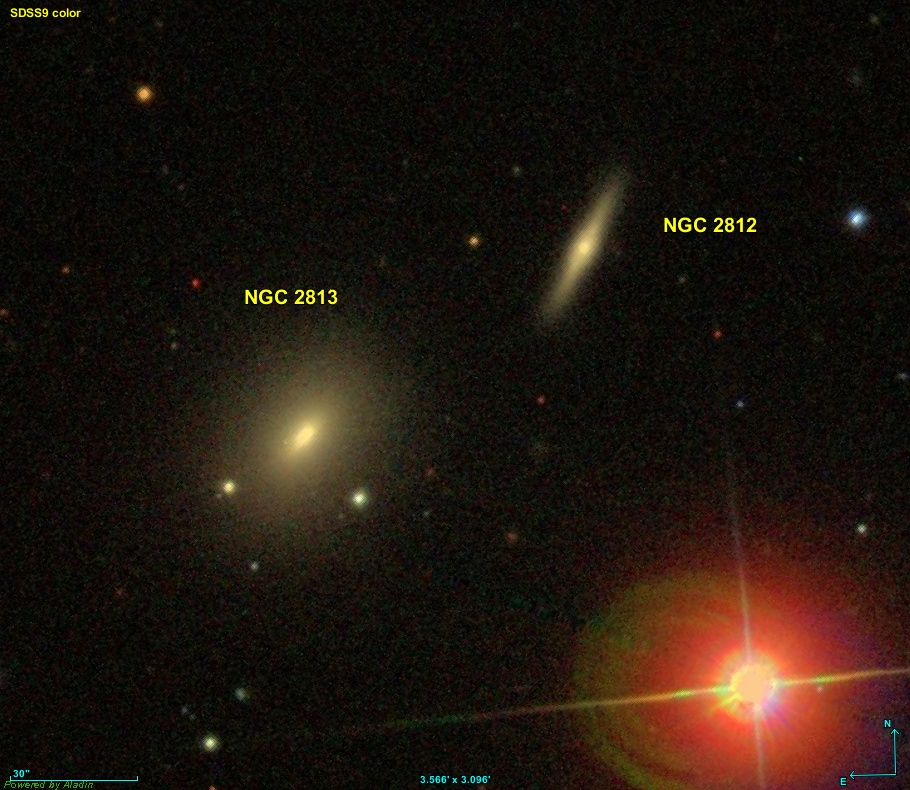
- SDSS image of NGC 2812 (upper right), NGC 2813 can be seen to the left

Observation data (J2000 epoch)
- Constellation: Cancer
- Right ascension: 09^{h} 17^{m} 40.8^{s}
- Declination: +19° 55′ 08″
- Redshift: 9070 ± 20 km/s
- Apparent magnitude (V): 15.7

Characteristics
- Type: S0/Sb
- Apparent size (V): 0.5′ × 0.3′

Other designations
- PGC 26242

NGC 2812 is a lenticular galaxy in the constellation Cancer. It was discovered by Albert Marth on February 17, 1865.
