= NGC 2240 =

Open cluster in the constellation Auriga

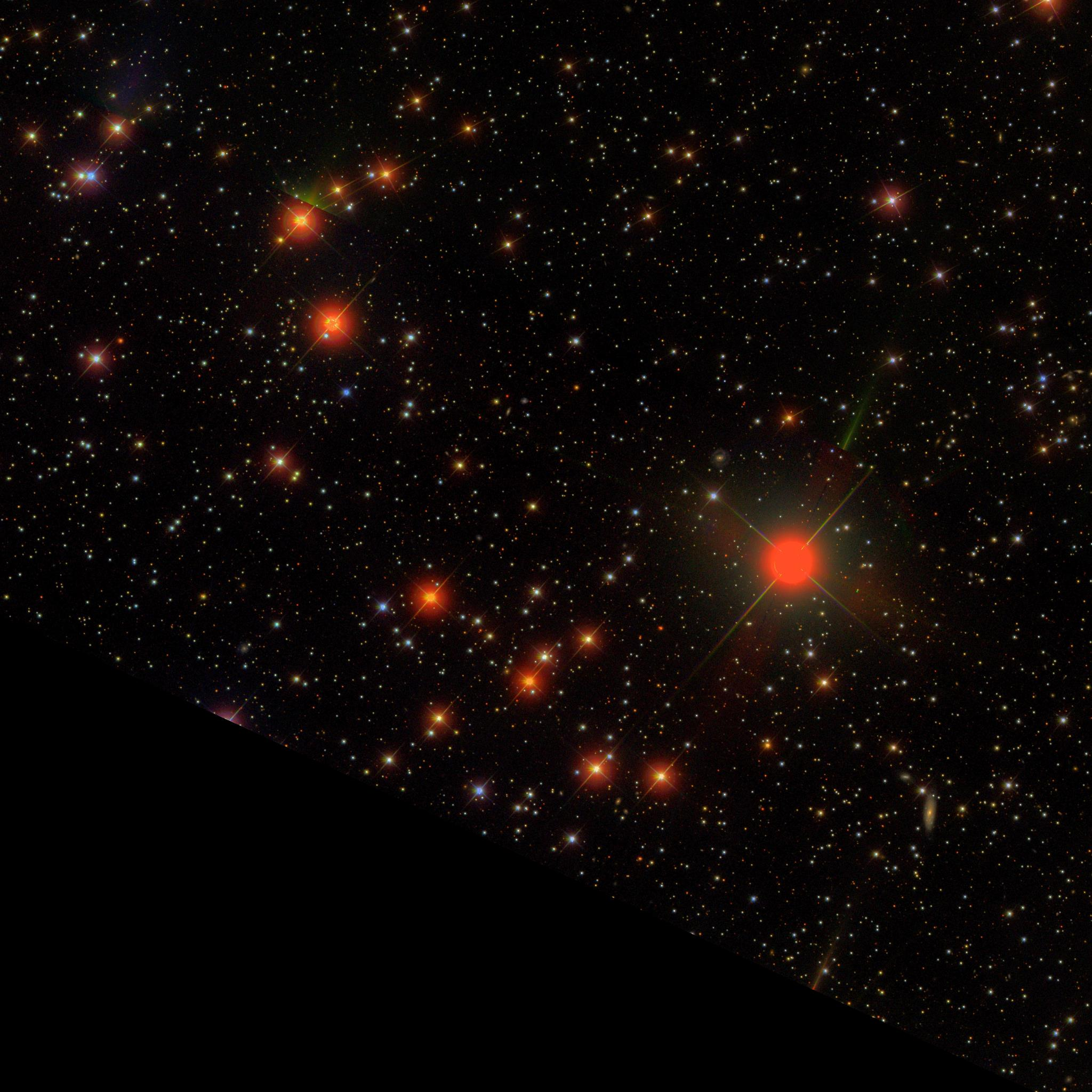
- SDSS

Observation data (J2000 epoch)
- Right ascension: 06^{h} 33^{m} 10.5^{s}
- Declination: +35° 15′ 02″
- Apparent dimensions (V): 11'

Physical characteristics

Associations
- Constellation: Auriga

NGC 2240 is an open cluster in the constellation Auriga. It was discovered by William Herschel on January 3, 1786, and is located about 5.1 thousand light-years away.
