= NGC 2758 =

Spiral galaxy in the Hydra constellation

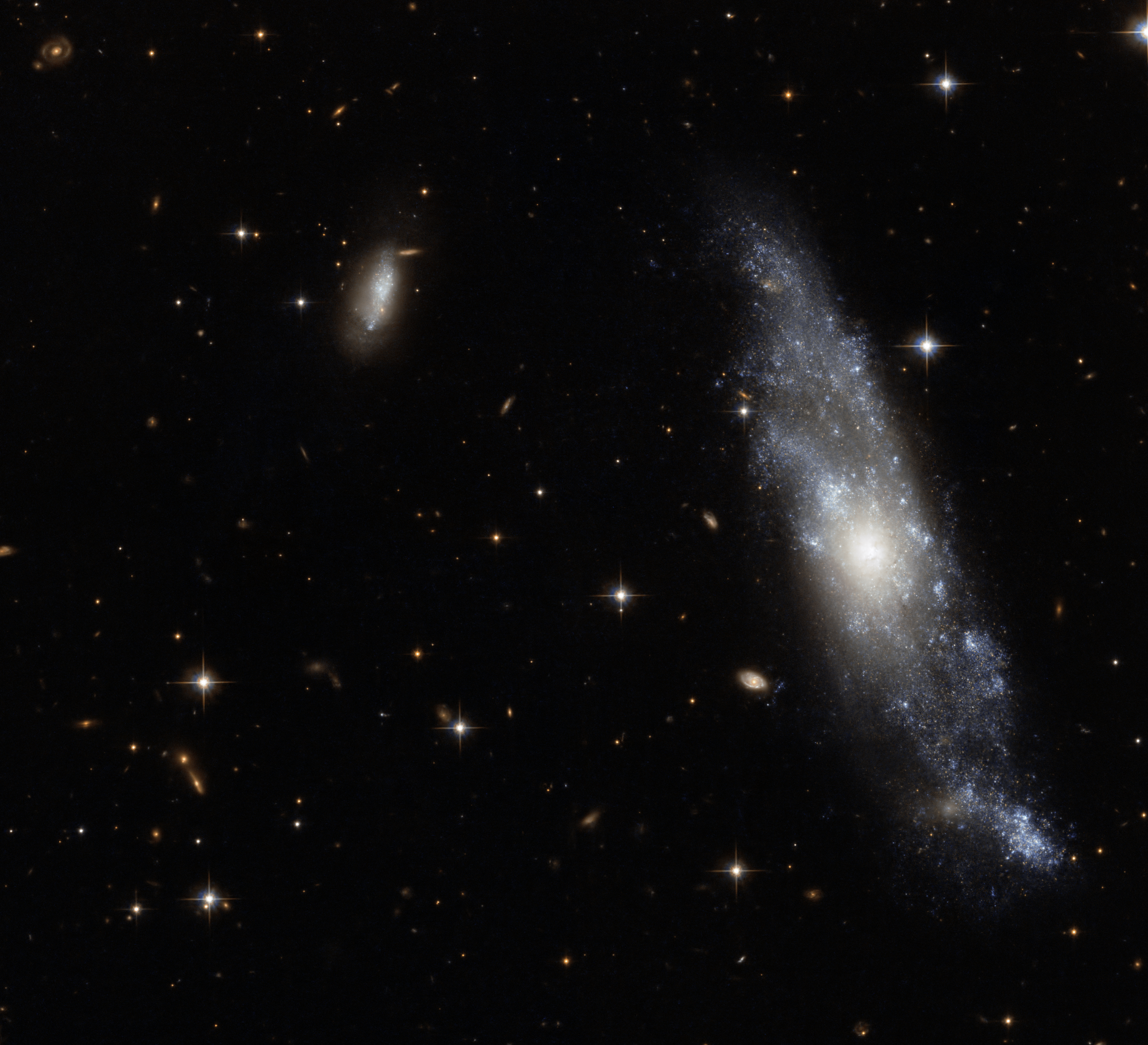
- NGC 2758 image by Hubble Space Telescope

Observation data (J2000 epoch)
- Constellation: Hydra
- Right ascension: 09^{h} 05^{m} 31.2317^{s}
- Declination: −19° 02′ 33.632″
- Distance: 109 Mly
- Apparent magnitude (V): 13.4

Characteristics
- Type: (R')SBbc pec?

Other designations
- NGC 2758, ESO 564- G 020, ESO 090313-1850.6, MCG -03-23-019, WISEA J090531.23-190233.6

NGC 2758 is a spiral galaxy located in the constellation Hydra. NGC 2758 was discovered by the American astronomer Frank Muller in 1886.
