= NGC 2009 =

Star cluster in the constellation Dorado

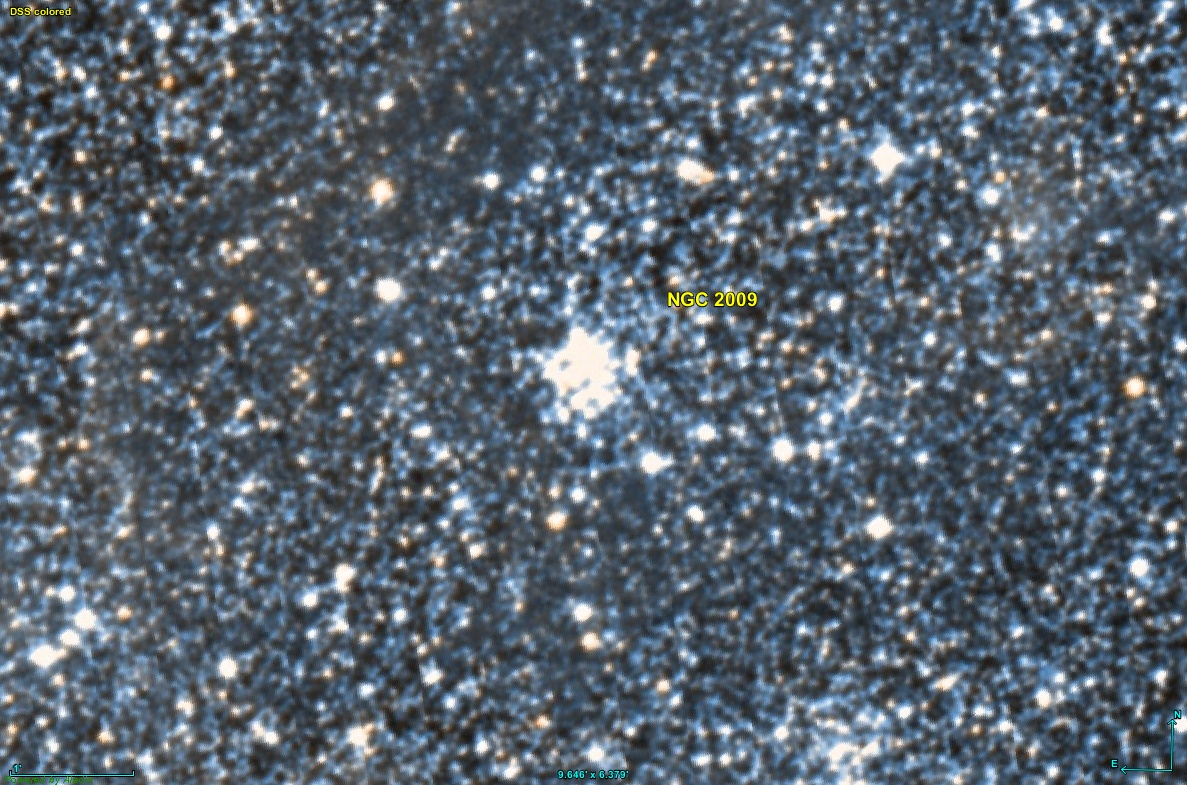
- The open cluster NGC 2009

Observation data (J2000 epoch)
- Right ascension: 05^{h} 30^{m} 48^{s}
- Declination: −69° 09′ 49″
- Distance: 160,000 ly (49,000 pc)
- Apparent magnitude (V): 11

Physical characteristics

Associations
- Constellation: Dorado

NGC 2009 (also known as ESO 56-140) is a small open cluster located in the constellation Dorado. It was discovered by British astronomer John Herschel on November 3, 1834 with a visual magnitude of 11.02, being visible with a telescope having an aperture of 6 inches (150mm) or more. It is located in the Large Magellanic Cloud and is estimated to be between 45 and 50 light years across.
