= NGC 2692 =

Galaxy in the constellation Ursa Major

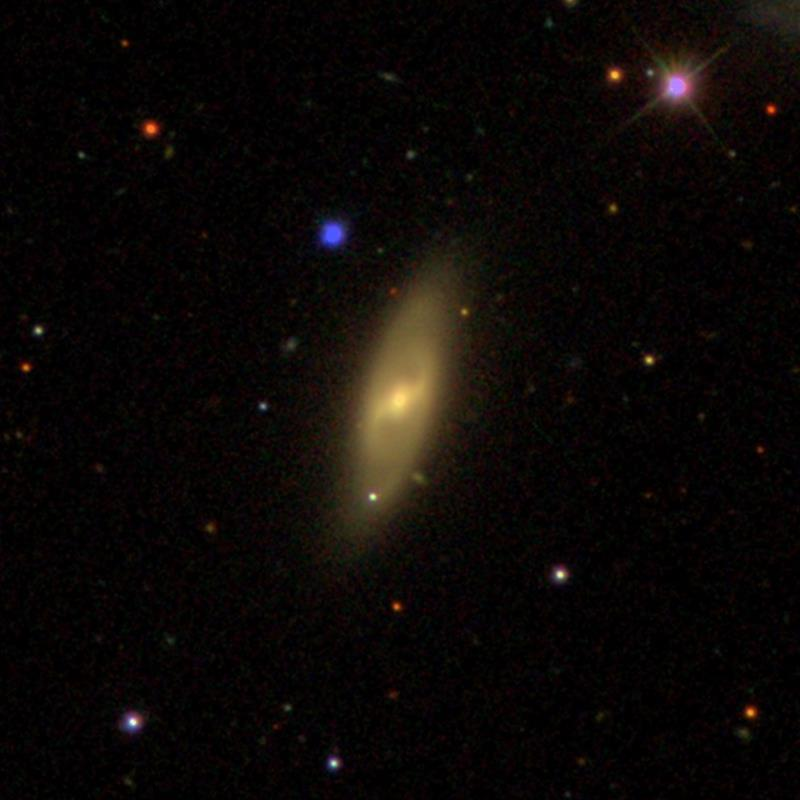
- A Sloan Digital Sky Survey (SDSS) image of NGC 2692

Observation data (J2000 epoch)
- Constellation: Ursa Major
- Right ascension: 08^{h} 56^{m} 58.20^{s}
- Declination: +52° 03′ 55.0″
- Redshift: 0.012585 ± 6.67e-6
- Distance: 188 Mly (57.90 Mpc)
- Apparent magnitude (V): 13.3

Characteristics
- Type: SBab
- Size: 46,000 ly
- Apparent size (V): 1.259′ × 0.468′
- Notable features: Very faint, small, round, pretty suddenly brighter middle

Other designations
- UGC 04675, CGCG 264-036, CGCG 0853.3+5216, MCG +09-15-057

NGC 2692 is a spiral galaxy located around 188 million light-years away in the constellation Ursa Major. It was discovered on March 17, 1790, by astronomer William Herschel, and it has a diameter around 46,000 light-years. NGC 2692 is not known to have lots of star-formation, and it is not known to have an active galactic nucleus.
