= NGC 2178 =

Elliptical galaxy

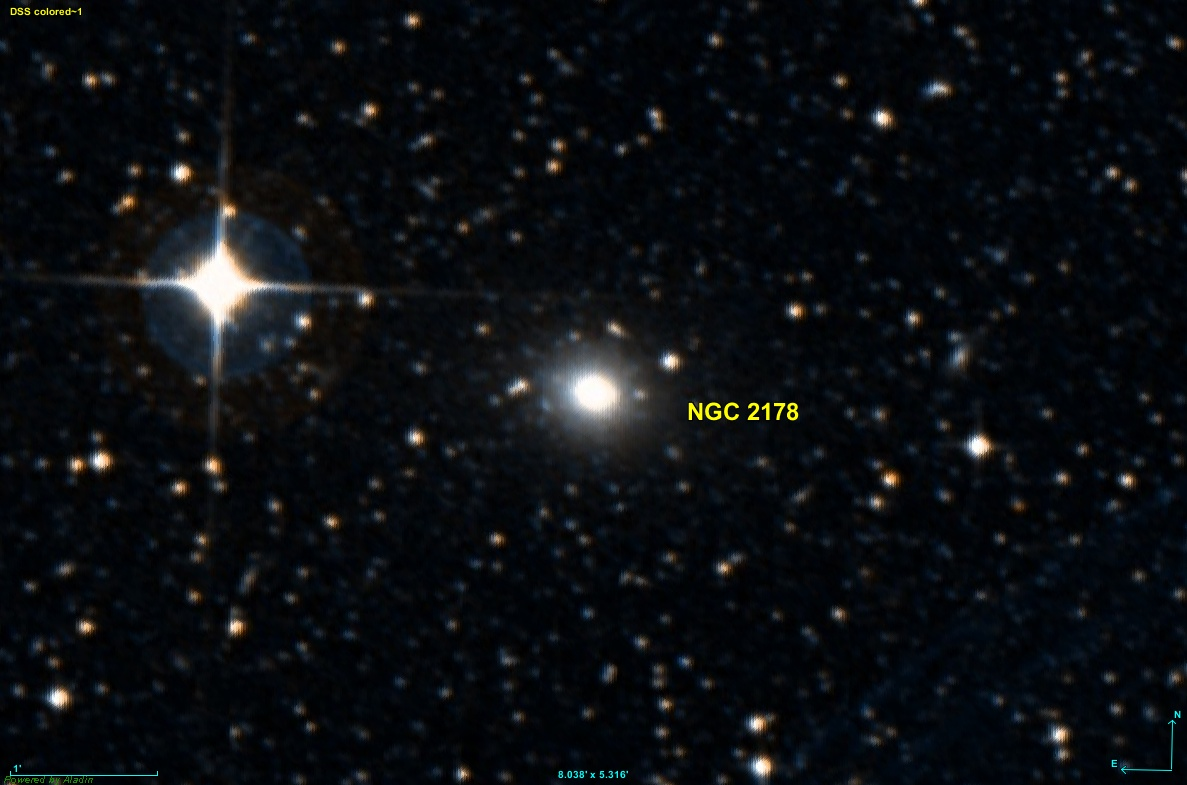

Observation data (J2000.0 epoch)
- Constellation: Pictor
- Right ascension: 06^{h} 02^{m} 47,5^{s}
- Declination: −63° 45′ 50″
- Distance: 370 million LY
- Apparent magnitude (V): 13.65

NGC 2178 is an elliptical galaxy in the constellation Pictor. The galaxy was first discovered in 1835 by astronomer John Herschel.
