= NGC 2197 =

Open cluster in the constellation Dorado

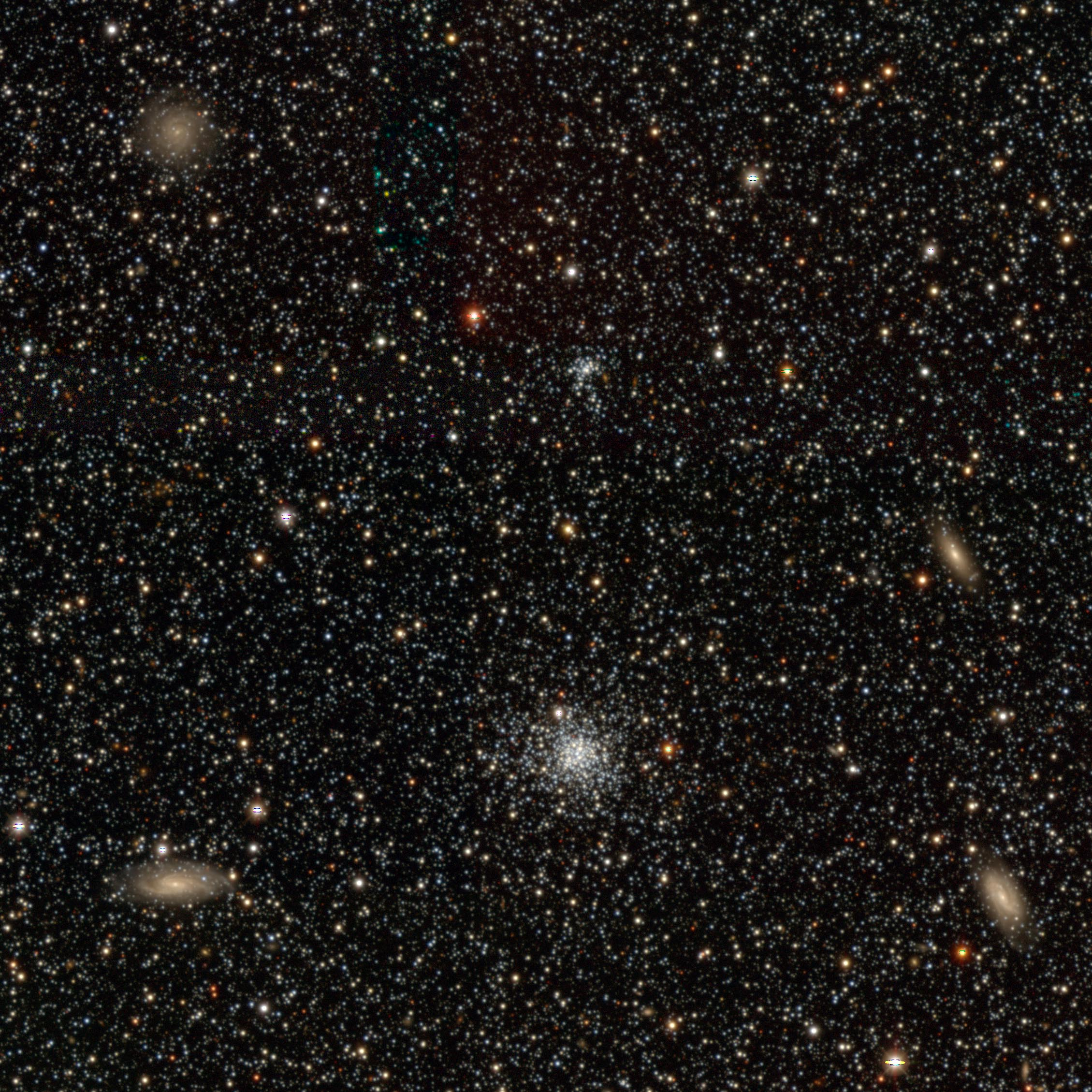
- NGC 2197 and surrounding galaxies, including ESO 86-59 on the lower left (legacy surveys)

Observation data (J2000.0 epoch)
- Right ascension: 06^{h} 06^{m} 87^{s}
- Declination: −67° 05′ 51″

Physical characteristics
- Other designations: ESO 86-SC58

Associations
- Constellation: Dorado

NGC 2197 is an centrally condensed open cluster within the Large Magellanic Cloud, in the constellation Dorado. It is estimated to be 400 million years old.
