= NGC 2241 =

Open cluster in the constellation Dorado

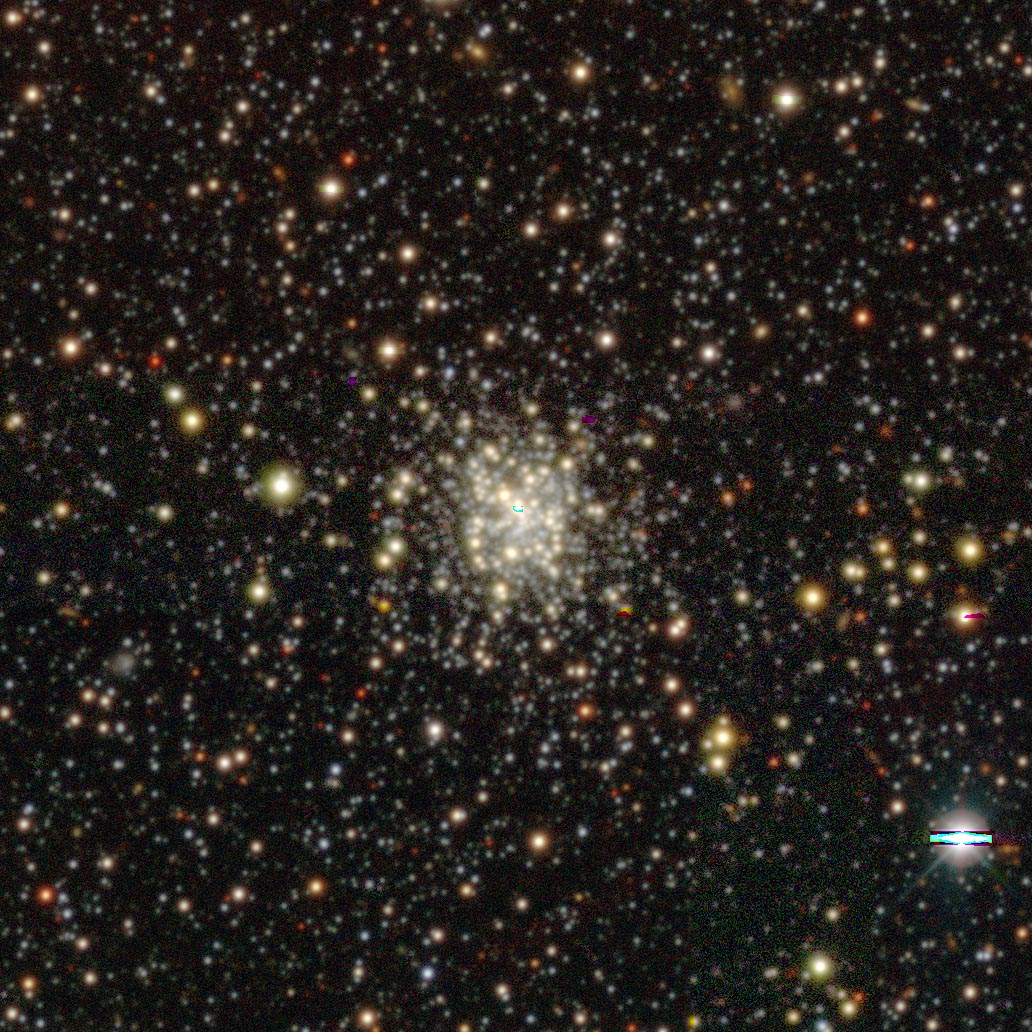
- NGC 2241 with the legacy surveys

Observation data (J2000 epoch)
- Right ascension: 06^{h} 22^{m} 53.0^{s}
- Declination: −68° 55′ 30″

Physical characteristics
- Other designations: ESO 57-SC79, NGC 2241

Associations
- Constellation: Dorado

NGC 2241 is an open cluster in the constellation Dorado. Located in the Large Magellanic Cloud, it was discovered by English astronomer John Herschel on January 31, 1835. This cluster spans an angular diameter of 1.60′.

Based on the cluster's color-magnitude diagram, it has an estimated age of three to four million years.
