= NGC 2041 =

Star cluster in the constellation Dorado

NGC 2041 is a globular cluster situated in the constellation Dorado. The visual magnitude of this cluster is 10.36, and that means NGC 2041 is visible with an 80 mm binocular aperture or a small telescope. This cluster was found by James Dunlop in 1826 with help of 22.86 cm (9 inch) reflector discovered.
