= NGC 2100 =

Open cluster in the constellation Dorado

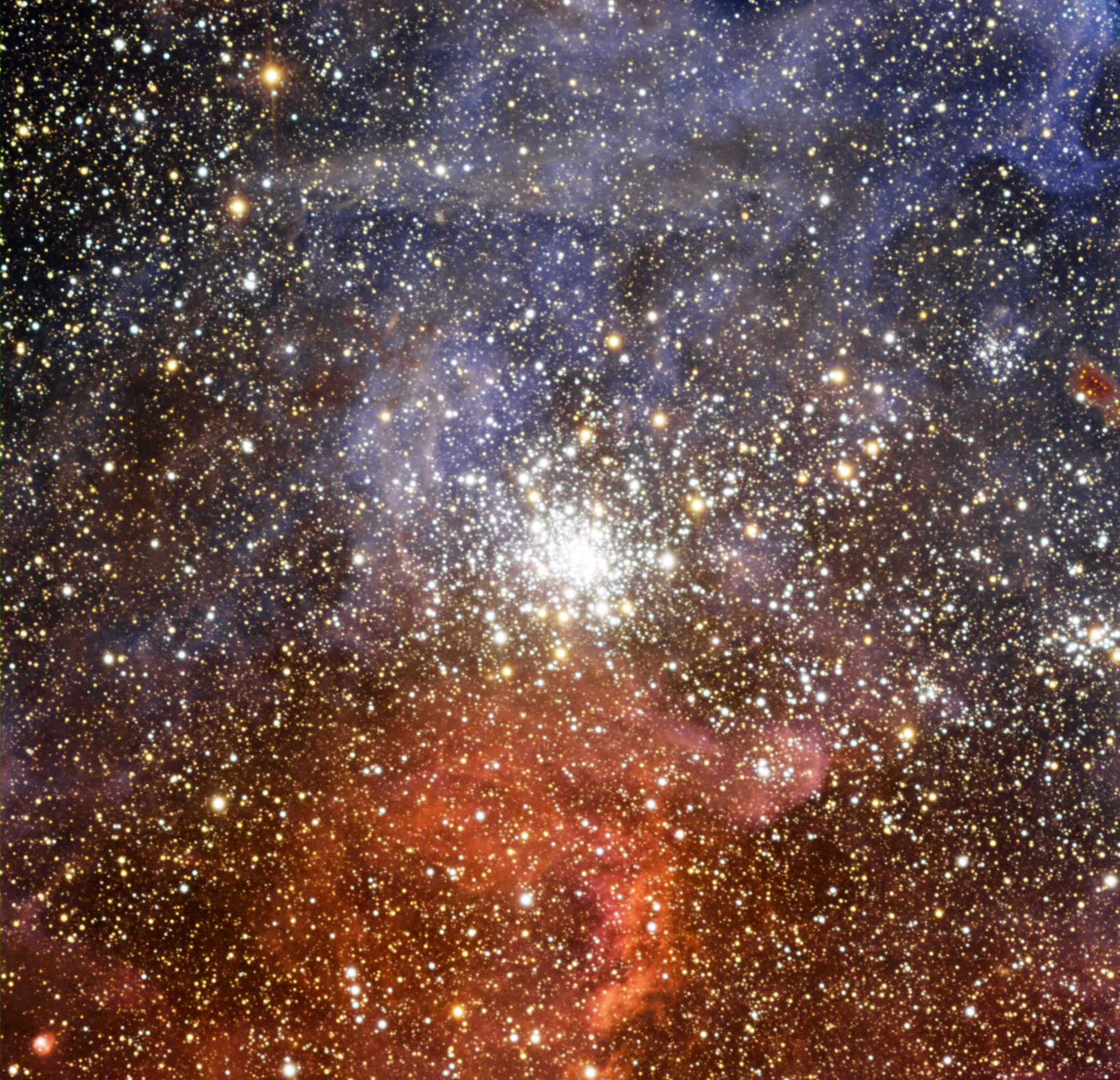
- Star cluster NGC 2100 in the Large Magellanic Cloud. Image taken at La Silla observatory. Credit: ESO

Observation data (J2000 epoch)
- Right ascension: 05^{h} 42^{m} 08^{s}
- Declination: −69° 12.7′

Physical characteristics
- Estimated age: 15 million years old
- Other designations: NGC 2100, KMHK 1257, [SL63] 662

Associations
- Constellation: Dorado

NGC 2100 is an open cluster in the Large Magellanic Cloud, a small satellite galaxy of the Milky Way. These clusters have a lifespan measured in tens or hundreds of millions of years, as they eventually disperse through gravitational interaction with other bodies. As its format is approximately round, it is sometimes mistaken as a globular cluster.
