= NGC 2210 =

Globular star cluster

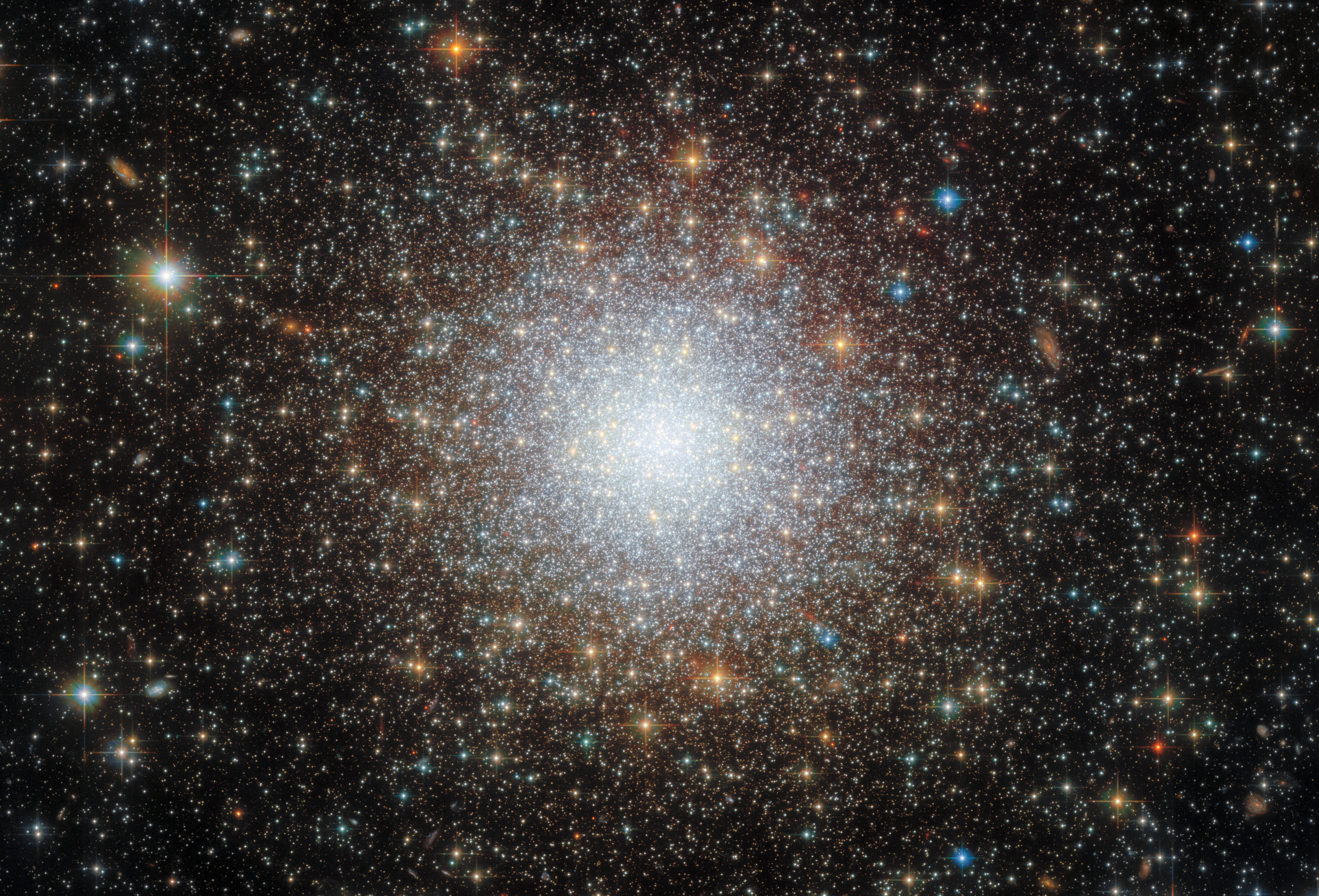
- NGC 2210 as imaged by the Hubble Space Telescope

Observation data (J2000 epoch)
- Constellation: Dorado
- Right ascension: 06^{h} 11^{m} 31.296^{s}
- Declination: −69° 07′ 17.04″
- Apparent dimensions (V): 1.007′ × 0.886′ (NIR)

Physical characteristics
- Metallicity: [Fe/H] = −1.74 dex
- Estimated age: 11.6 Gyr
- Other designations: ESO 57-71, HD 272034, 2MASX J06113129-6907170

NGC 2210 is a globular cluster located in the Large Magellanic Cloud, in the constellation Dorado. It is situated south of the celestial equator and, as such, it is more easily visible from the southern hemisphere. It was first discovered by astronomer John Herschel on January 31, 1835. In 2017, Rachel Wagner-Kaiser and a group of researchers from the University of Florida discovered that NGC 2210, as well as five other globular clusters located in the Large Magellanic Cloud were of roughly the same age as some star clusters found in the Milky Way, and that NGC 2210 is roughly 11.6 billion years old. It was first imaged by the Hubble Space Telescope in 2023.
