= NGC 2003 =

Open cluster in the constellation Dorado

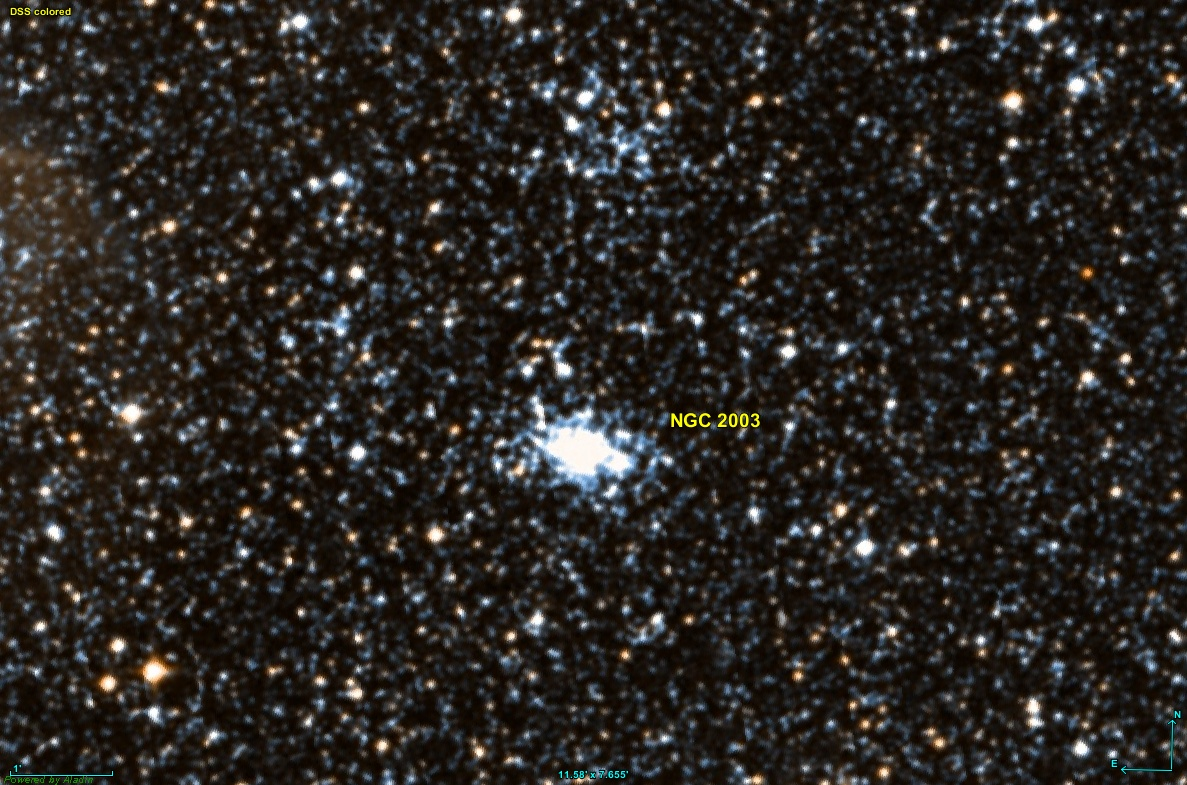
- Image of NGC 2003

Observation data (J2000 epoch)
- Constellation: Dorado
- Right ascension: 05^{h} 30^{m} 55.040^{s}
- Declination: −66° 30′ 05.00″
- Distance: 163,000

Physical characteristics
- Other designations: "PGC 3518064" also known as ESO 086-SC006 and SL 526

NGC 2003 (also known as PGC 3518064, ESO 086-SC006 and SL 526) is a globular cluster located in the constellation Dorado and is part of the Large Magellanic Cloud.

== Background ==
It is not visible to the naked eye and requires a telescope to observe. The cluster is located at a distance of approximately 163,000 light-years from Earth. It was first discovered by John Herschel on 23 November 1834. Its apparent size is about 1.75 by 0.9 arc minutes.
