= NGC 2328 =

Low luminosity lenticular galaxy in the constellation Puppis

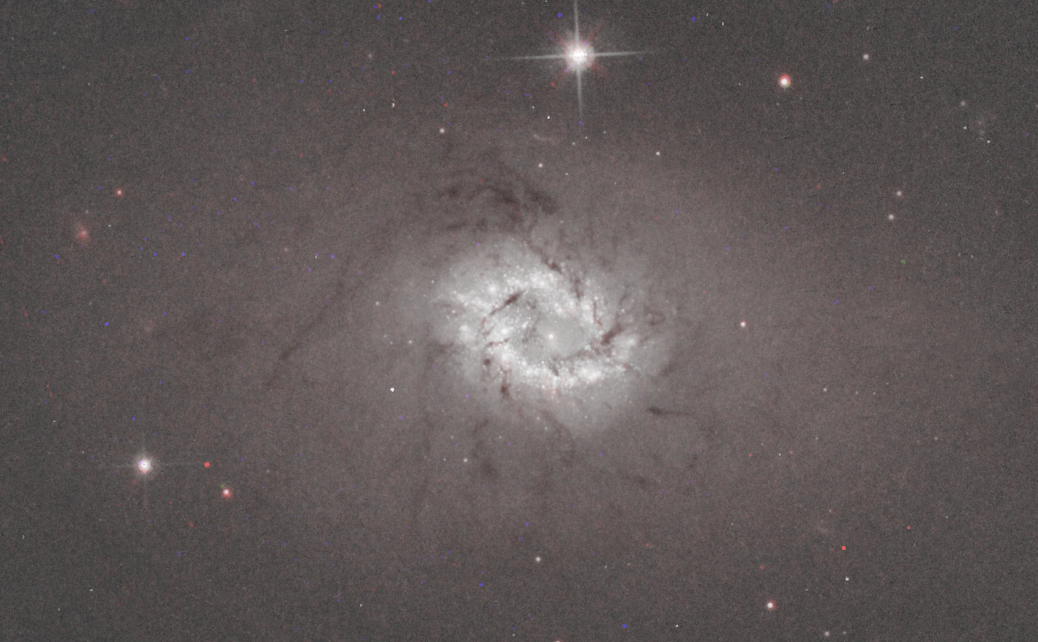
- HST image of NGC 2328

Observation data (J2000 epoch)
- Constellation: Puppis
- Right ascension: 07^{h} 02^{m} 36.193^{s}
- Declination: −42° 04′ 06.88″
- Redshift: 0.003930
- Heliocentric radial velocity: 1176.0 km/s
- Distance: 59 Mly (18 Mpc)
- Apparent magnitude (V): 12.55
- Apparent magnitude (B): 13.16
- Absolute magnitude (V): −18.5

Characteristics
- Type: (R')SAB0^{−}?

Other designations
- MCG -07-15-002, PGC 20046

NGC 2328 is a low-luminosity, early-type (lenticular) galaxy. It is located in the constellation Puppis. NGC 2328 is its New General Catalogue designation. It is located about 59 million light-years (18 Megaparsecs) away from the Sun.

NGC 2328 was imaged by the Hubble Space Telescope, revealing a ring of star clusters near the center of the galaxy. These star clusters are massive, and are consequently quite young as well.
