= NGC 2906 =

Spiral galaxy in the constellation Leo

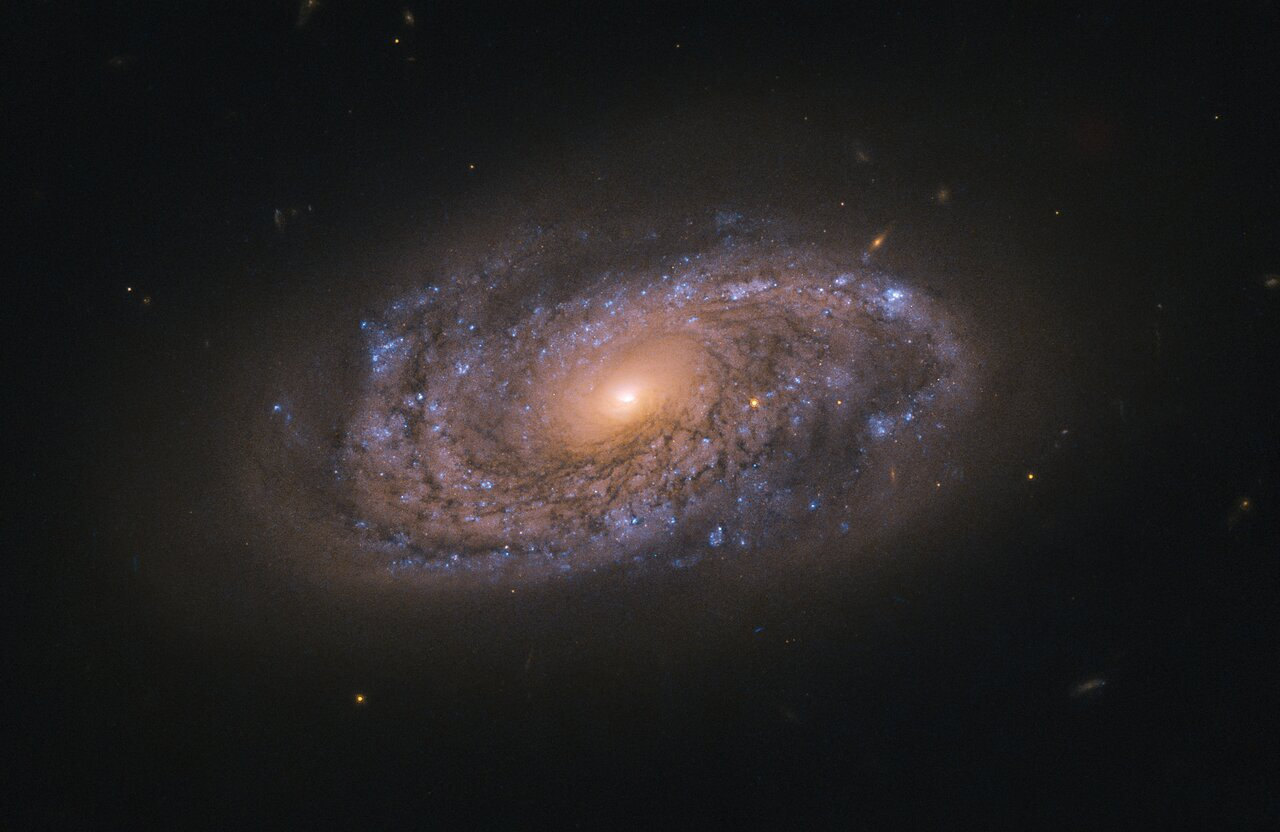
- NGC 2906 by Hubble Space Telescope

Observation data (J2000 epoch)
- Constellation: Leo
- Right ascension: 09^{h} 32^{m} 06.2^{s}
- Declination: +08° 26′ 30″
- Redshift: 0.007138 ± 0.000020
- Heliocentric radial velocity: 2,140 ± 6 km/s
- Distance: 126 ± 24 Mly (38.8 ± 7.2 Mpc)
- Apparent magnitude (V): 12.5

Characteristics
- Type: Scd
- Apparent size (V): 2.1′ × 1.0′

Other designations
- UGC 5081, CGCG 063-001, MCG +02-25-001, PGC 27074

NGC 2906 is a spiral galaxy in the constellation Leo. It is circa 120 million light years from Earth, which, given its apparent dimensions, means that NGC 2906 is about 75,000 light years across. It was discovered by William Herschel on December 28, 1785.

The galaxy is characterised by a normal star formation rate, which has been calculated to be 0.8 M_{☉} per year. The total mass of the galaxy is estimated to be 4×10^{10} M_{☉}. A total of 241 HII regions have been identified in the galaxy.

One supernova has been observed in NGC 2906, SN 2005ip. The supernova was discovered by T. Boles on November 6, 2005, with a 0.35m refractor, with an estimated apparent magnitude 15.5 and was identified as a type II supernova, probably within a few weeks past explosion. As the supernova declined in brightness, it reached a plateau that lasted for a bit more than two years and its spectrum became dominated by narrow lines (IIn), an unusual feature of supernovae, that was attributed to the interaction of the supernova with dust located around it. It is also possible that the supernova created dust.

NGC 2906 is member of a group of galaxies, the NGC 2894 group. Other galaxies identified as members of the cluster are NGC 2882, NGC 2894, and IC 450.
