= NGC 2606 =

Galaxy in the constellation Ursa Major

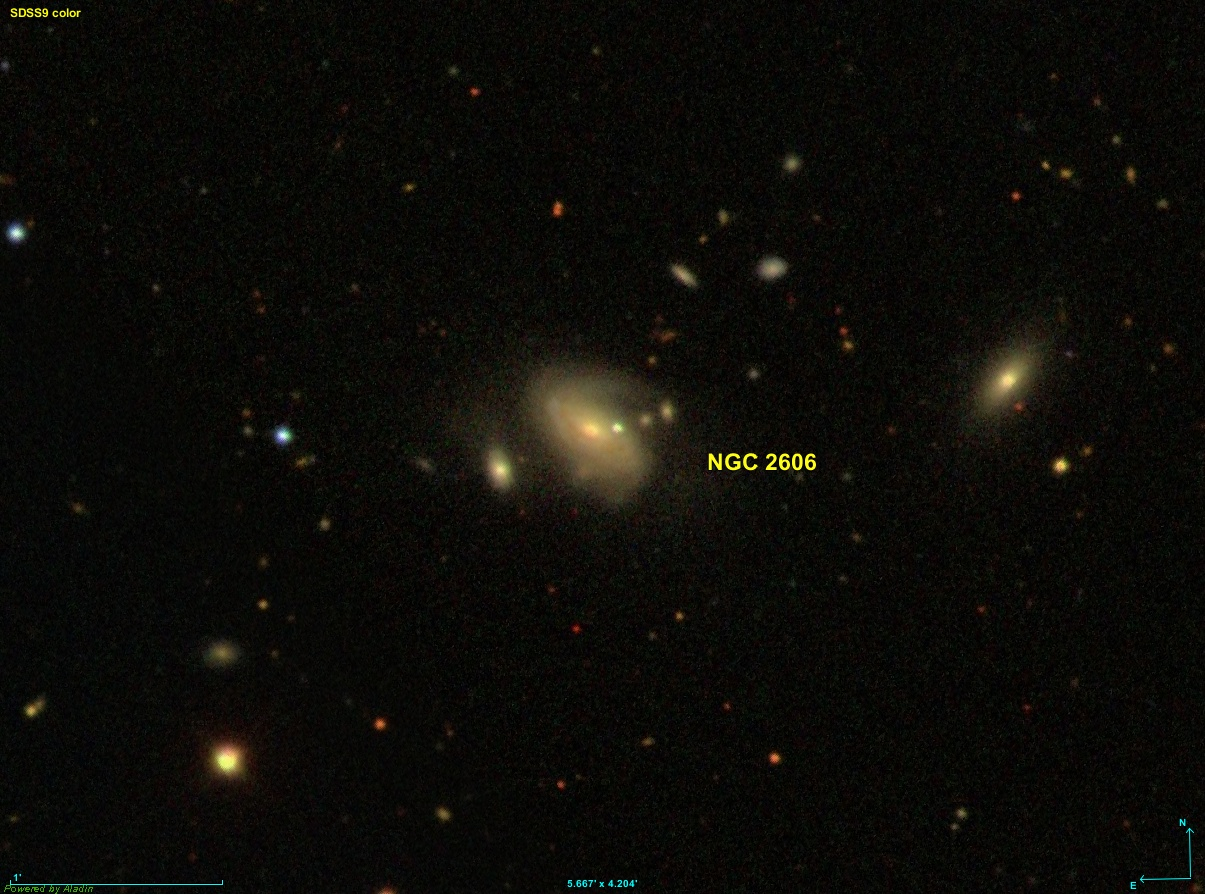
- A Sloan Digital Sky Survey (SDSS) image of NGC 2606

Observation data (J2000 epoch)
- Constellation: Ursa Major
- Right ascension: 08^{h} 35^{m} 34.5^{s}
- Declination: +52° 47′ 20″
- Redshift: 0.044341 ± 1.28e-5
- Distance: 646 Mly (198.08 Mpc)
- Apparent magnitude (V): 17.02

Characteristics
- Type: Sab
- Size: 232,000 ly
- Apparent size (V): 0.661′ × 0.339′
- Notable features: Type II Seyfert galaxy

Other designations
- PGC 24117, MCG+09-14-072, Z 263-59, LEDA 24117

NGC 2606 is a spiral galaxy located around 646 million light-years away in the constellation Ursa Major. NGC 2606 was discovered on February 16, 1831 by the astronomer John Herschel, and it has a diameter around 232,000 light-years. NGC 2606 is known to have some star-formation, and it is known to have an active galactic nucleus, specifically a Type II Seyfert galaxy.
