= Upsilon Cancri =

The Bayer designation Upsilon Cancri (υ Cnc / υ Cancri) is shared by two stars, in the constellation Cancer:

- υ^{1} Cancri
- υ^{2} Cancri

They are separated by 0.34° on the sky.

In Johann Bode’s Uranographia, the designation Rho Cancri is applied to five different stars:

- υ^{1} Cancri is 24 Cancri
- υ^{2} Cancri is 28 Cancri
- υ^{3} Cancri is 30 Cancri
- υ^{4} Cancri is 32 Cancri

Bode’s superscripted letters are now rarely used though, so the designations have been reverted to the original 2 stars.
