= Omicron Cancri =

The Bayer designation Omicron Cancri (ο Cnc / ο Cancri) is shared by two stars in the constellation Cancer:

- ο^{1} Cancri
- ο^{2} Cancri

They are separated by 0.27° on the sky. With a physical separation of 0.2163 parsec (0.705 light-year), the stars most likely form a co-moving pair.
