= Mu Cancri =

Mu Cancri (μ Cancri, μ Cnc, Mu Cnc) is a Bayer designation that could refer to two stars in the constellation Cancer:

- Mu^{2} Cancri (10 Cancri)
- Mu^{1} Cancri (BL Cancri, 9 Cancri)

Mu Cancri also sometimes just means Mu^{2} Cancri.
