= QSO B0839+187 =

Quasar in the constellation Cancer

Observation data (Epoch J2000)
- Constellation: Cancer
- Right ascension: 08^{h} 42^{m} 05.0942^{s}
- Declination: +18° 35′ 40.991″
- Redshift: 1.27
- Distance: 8.4 billion light-years (Light travel time)
- Type: Rad
- Apparent magnitude (V): 16.36

Other designations
- LEDA 2825583, PKS J0842+1835, PKS 0839+187, 2MASS J08420509+1835411, QSO B0839+1846

QSO B0839+187 (PKS 0839+187) is a quasar that was used for a VLBI experiment conducted by Edward Fomalont and Sergei Kopeikin in September 2002. They claimed to measure the speed of gravity, but this is disputed.
