= NGC 2503 =

Galaxy in the constellation Cancer

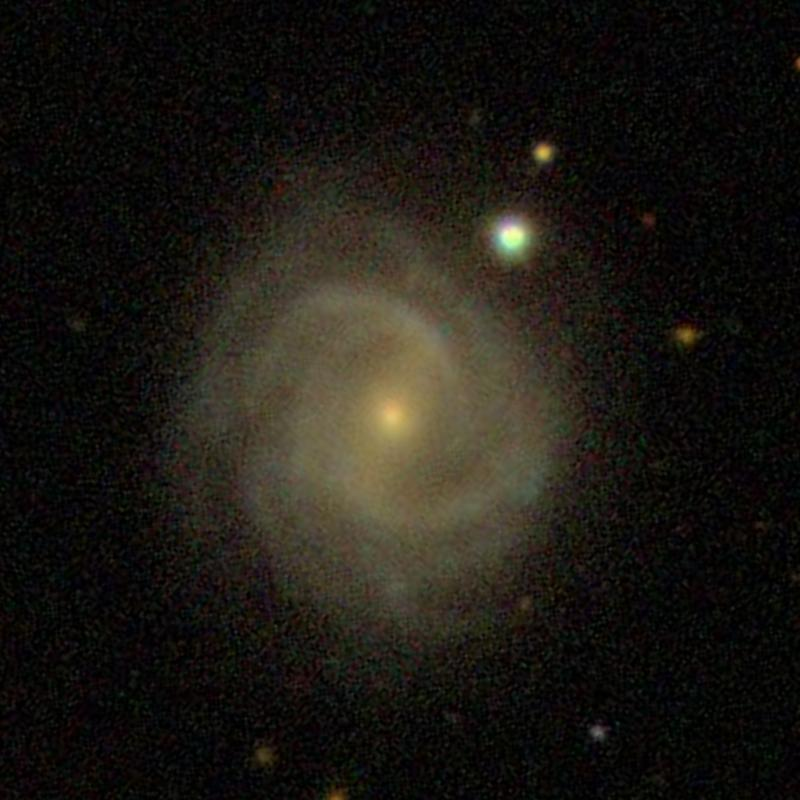
- Spiral galaxy NGC 2503

Observation data (J2000 epoch)
- Constellation: Cancer
- Right ascension: 8^{h} 00^{m} 36.7^{s}
- Declination: 22° 24′ 00″
- Redshift: 0.018366/5506 km/s
- Distance: 254,300,000 ly
- Apparent magnitude (V): 14.4

Characteristics
- Type: SAB(rs)bc
- Size: ~87,630 ly (estimated)
- Apparent size (V): 1.07 × 0.98

Other designations
- CGCG 118-41, KARA 222, MCG 4-19-19, PGC 22453, UGC 4158

NGC 2503 is an isolated spiral galaxy approximately 254 million light-years away in the constellation Cancer. The galaxy was discovered on February 17, 1865 by astronomer Albert Marth.

== See also ==
- List of NGC objects (2001–3000)
