= NGC 2648 =

Spiral galaxy in the constellation Cancer

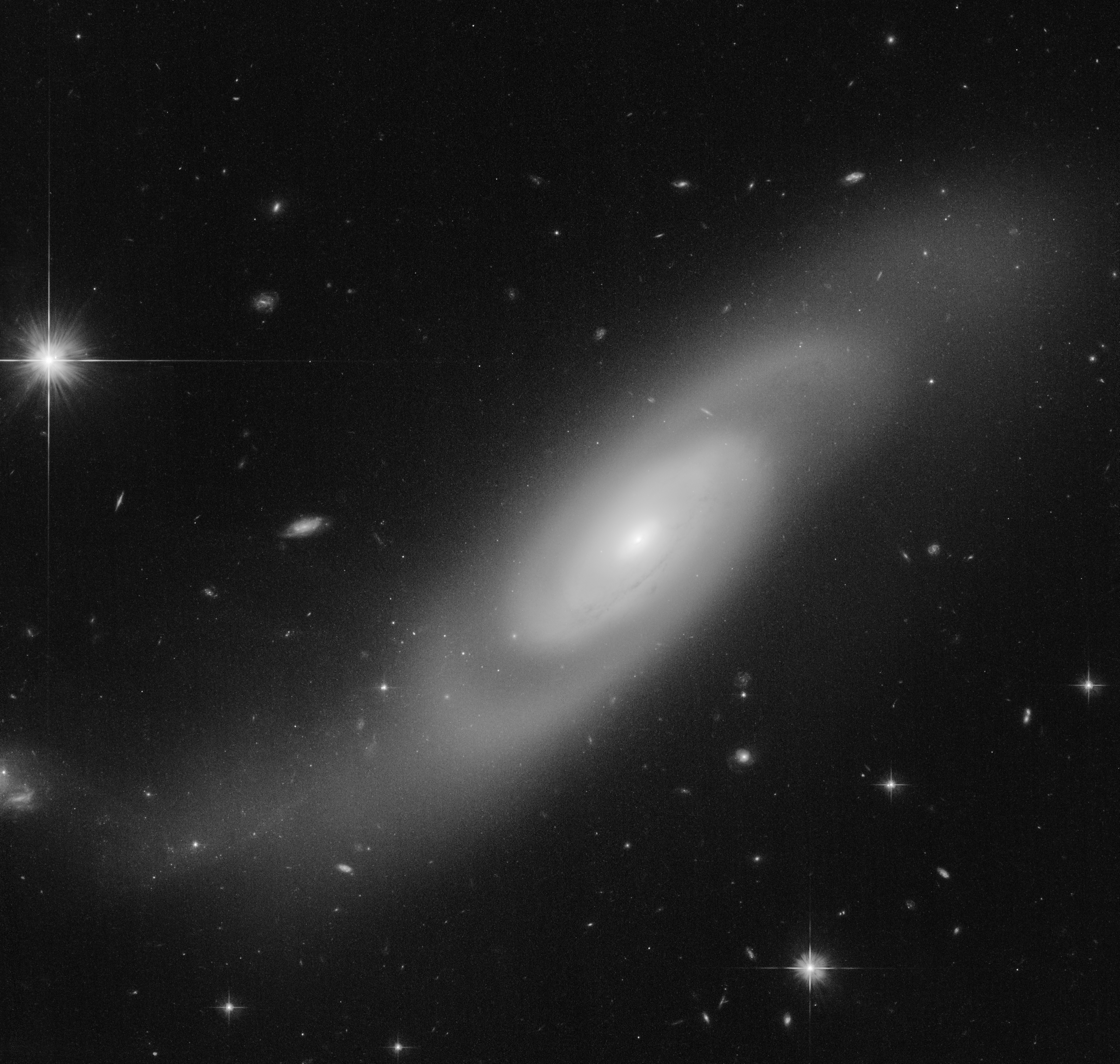
- NGC 2648 as seen during the SDSS

Observation data (J2000 epoch)
- Constellation: Cancer
- Right ascension: 08^{h} 42^{m} 39^{s}
- Declination: +14° 17′ 08″
- Apparent magnitude (V): 11.82
- Apparent magnitude (B): 12.8
- Surface brightness: 23.61 mag/arcsec^{2}

Characteristics
- Type: SAa

Other designations
- PGC 24464, ARP 89, UGC 4541, MCG 2-22-5, CGCG 60-35, KCPG 168A

NGC 2648 is an unbarred spiral galaxy located in the constellation Cancer. Its speed relative to the cosmic microwave background is 2,451 ± 19 km/s, which corresponds to a Hubble distance of 36.2 ± 2.6 Mpc (~118 million ly). NGC 2648 was discovered by German-British astronomer William Herschel in 1784.

The galaxies PGC 24469 and NGC 2648 are designated in Halton Arp's Atlas of Peculiar Galaxies as Arp 89.

The luminosity class of NGC 2648 is I and it has a broad HI line.

NGC 2648 is a retired galaxy, which is a galaxy in which star formation has practically ceased is said to be passive. However, some passive galaxies may still show faint emission lines similar to those of LINER galaxies. This is what a team of French and Brazilian astronomers discovered. It is from them that the name retired galaxy comes.

To date, three non-redshift measurements give a distance of 34.333 ± 0.231 Mpc (~112 million ly), which is within the Hubble distance values.

== See also ==
- List of NGC objects (2001–3000)
