= NGC 2556 =

Galaxy in the constellation Cancer

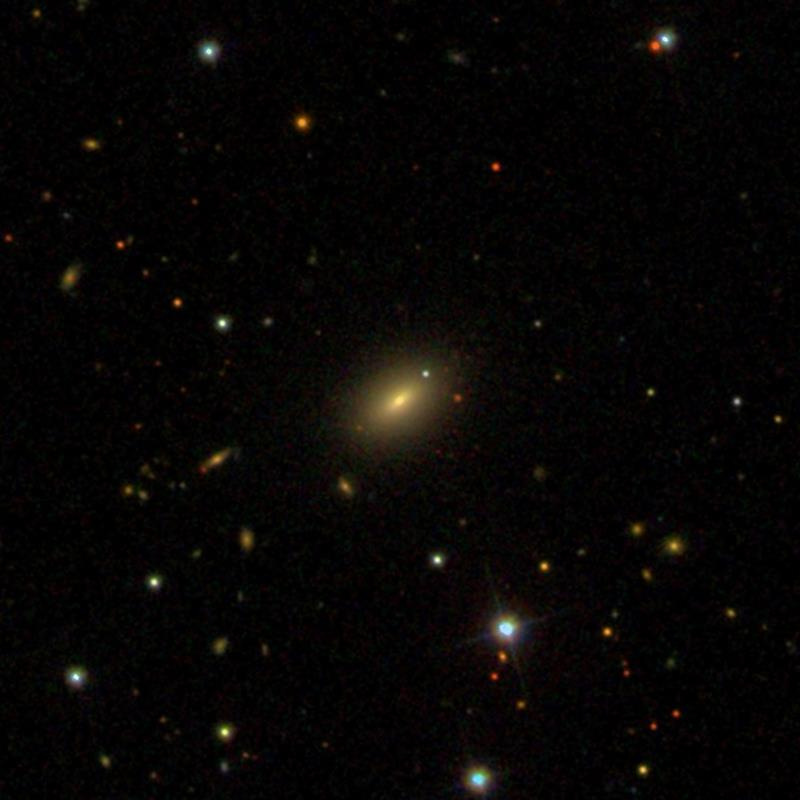
- A Sloan Digital Sky Survey (SDSS) Image of NGC 2556

Observation data (J2000 epoch)
- Constellation: Cancer
- Right ascension: 08^{h} 19^{m} 00^{s}
- Declination: +20° 56′ 13″
- Redshift: 0.015421±0.000033
- Distance: 232 Mly (71.31 Mpc)
- Apparent magnitude (V): 15.1

Characteristics
- Type: S0
- Size: 72,000 ly
- Apparent size (V): 0.617′ × 0.398′
- Notable features: Almost Edge-on(?)

Other designations
- PGC 23325, AGC 180195, Z 119-45, LEDA 23325

NGC 2556 is a lenticular galaxy located around 232 million light-years away in the constellation Cancer. NGC 2556 can be visible from both the Northern and Southern hemispheres since it is near the celestial equator. NGC 2556 was discovered on February 17, 1865 by the astronomer Albert Marth, and it is not known to have an active galactic nucleus.

== Galaxy group ==
NGC 2556 is a member of the LGG 158 galaxy group. Other members of the group include NGC 2558, NGC 2562, NGC 2557, NGC 2563, NGC 2560, and NGC 2569.

== See also ==
- List of NGC objects
- List of NGC objects (2001–3000)
