= NGC 2563 =

Lenticular galaxy in the constellation Cancer

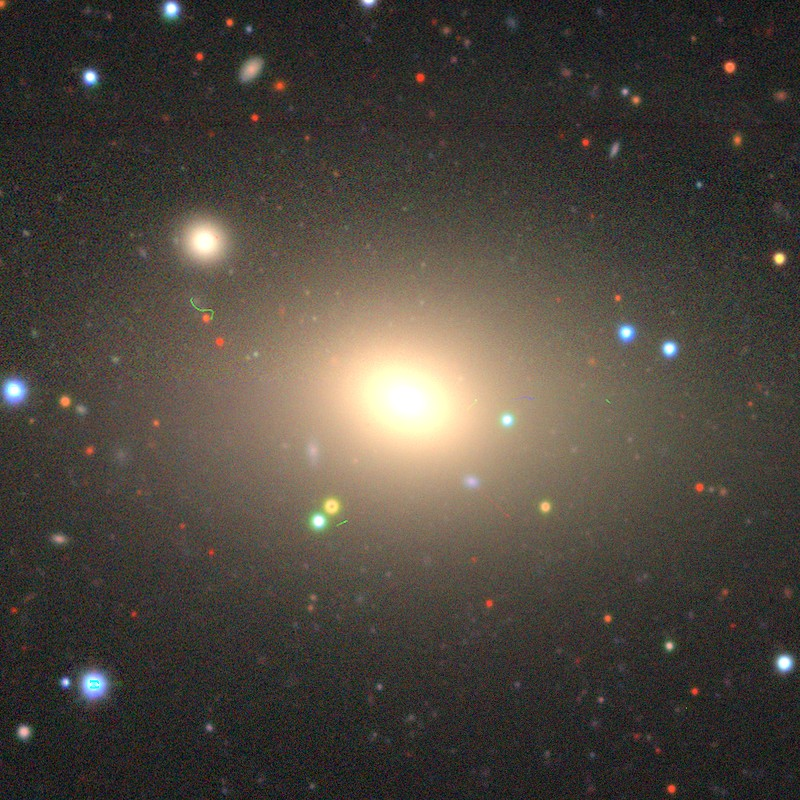

Observation data (J2000 epoch)
- Constellation: Cancer (constellation)
- Right ascension: 08^{h} 20^{m} 35.6916^{s}
- Declination: +21° 04′ 04.185″
- Distance: 210 Mly(64.6 Mpc)
- Group or cluster: NGC 2563 (LGG 158)
- Apparent magnitude (V): 12.39

Characteristics
- Type: S0

Other designations
- UGC 04347 CGCG 119-065 CGCG 0817.7+2114 MCG +04-20-033

NGC 2563 is a lenticular galaxy in constellation Cancer. It was discovered on February 13, 1787, by William Herschel.

== See also ==
- NGC 2563 group (LGG 158) :NGC 2556 NGC 2557 NGC 2558 NGC 2560 NGC 2562 NGC 2563 NGC 2569
- List of NGC objects (2001-3000)
