= NGC 2560 =

Galaxy in the constellation Cancer

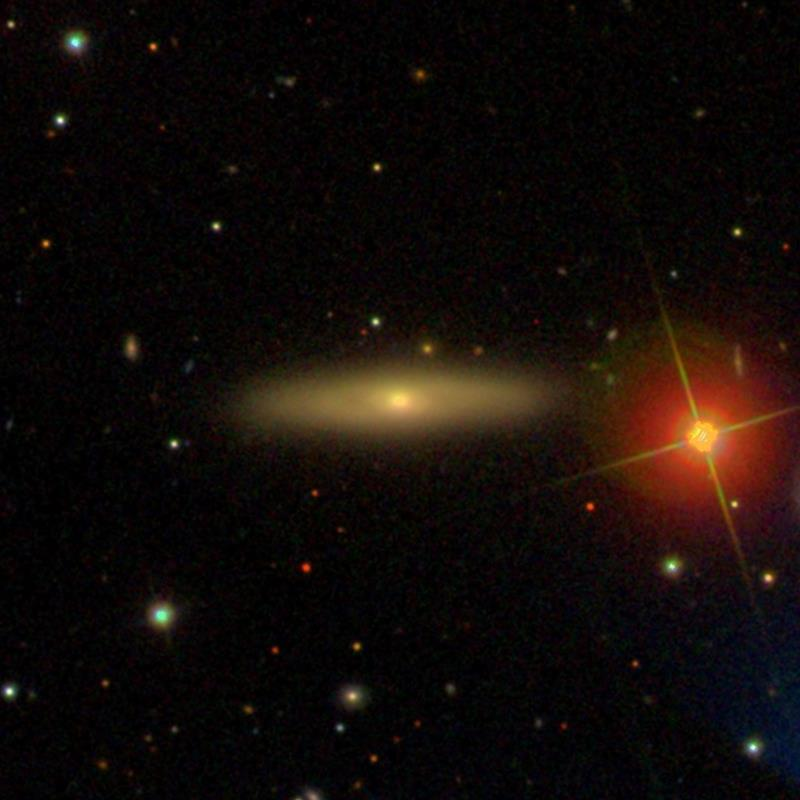
- A Sloan Digital Sky Survey (SDSS) Image of NGC 2560

Observation data
- Constellation: Cancer
- Right ascension: 08^{h} 19^{m} 51.893^{s}
- Declination: +20° 56′ 5.94″
- Redshift: 0.016288
- Distance: 230 Mly (70.77 Mpc)
- Group or cluster: NGC 2563 (LGG 158)
- Apparent magnitude (B): 14.9

Characteristics
- Type: S0-a

Other designations
- UGC 04337, CGCG 119-058, CGCG 0817.0+2108, MCG +04-20-027

NGC 2560 is a lenticular galaxy in the constellation Cancer. It was discovered on March 17 1862 by Heinrich d'Arrest.

== See also ==
- List of NGC objects (2001–3000)
- LGG 158 (Galaxy Group with 14 galaxies) : NGC 2556 NGC 2557 NGC 2558 NGC 2560 NGC 2562 NGC 2563 NGC 2569
- List of astronomical catalogues
