= NGC 2558 =

Galaxy in the constellation Cancer

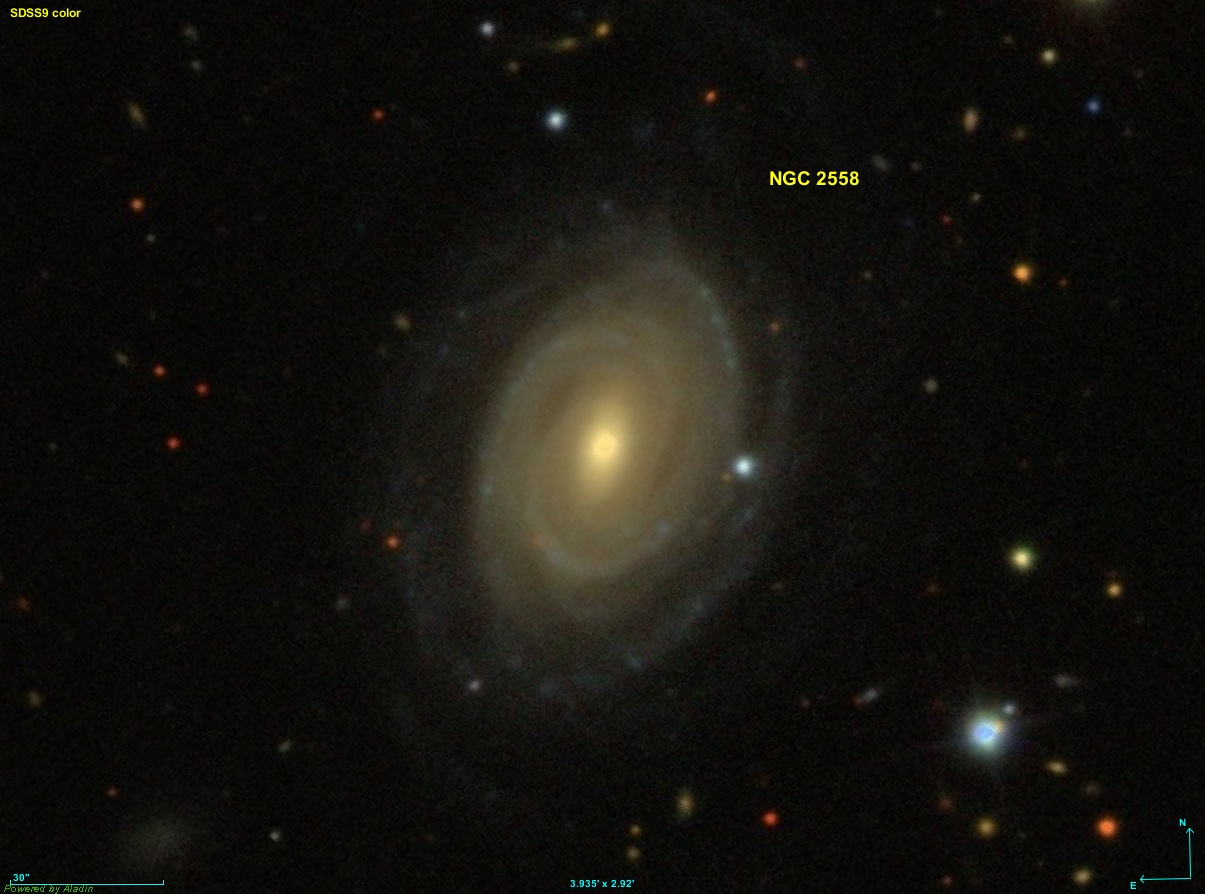
- A Sloan Digital Sky Survey (SDSS) Image of NGC 2558

Observation data (J2000 epoch)
- Constellation: Cancer
- Right ascension: 08^{h} 19^{m} 12.7681^{s}
- Declination: +20° 30′ 38.337″
- Distance: 316 Mly (96.83 Mpc)
- Group or cluster: NGC 2563 (LGG 158)
- Apparent magnitude (V): 13
- Apparent magnitude (B): 14.6

Other designations
- UGC 04331, CGCG 119-050, CGCG 0816.4+2040, MCG +04-20-022

NGC 2558 is a spiral galaxy in the constellation Cancer. It was discovered on February 13, 1787, by William Herschel.

== See also ==
- List of NGC objects (2001–3000)
- LGG 158 (Galaxy Group with 14 galaxies) : NGC 2556 NGC 2557 NGC 2558 NGC 2560 NGC 2562NGC 2563 NGC 2569
