= NGC 2545 =

Galaxy in the constellation Cancer

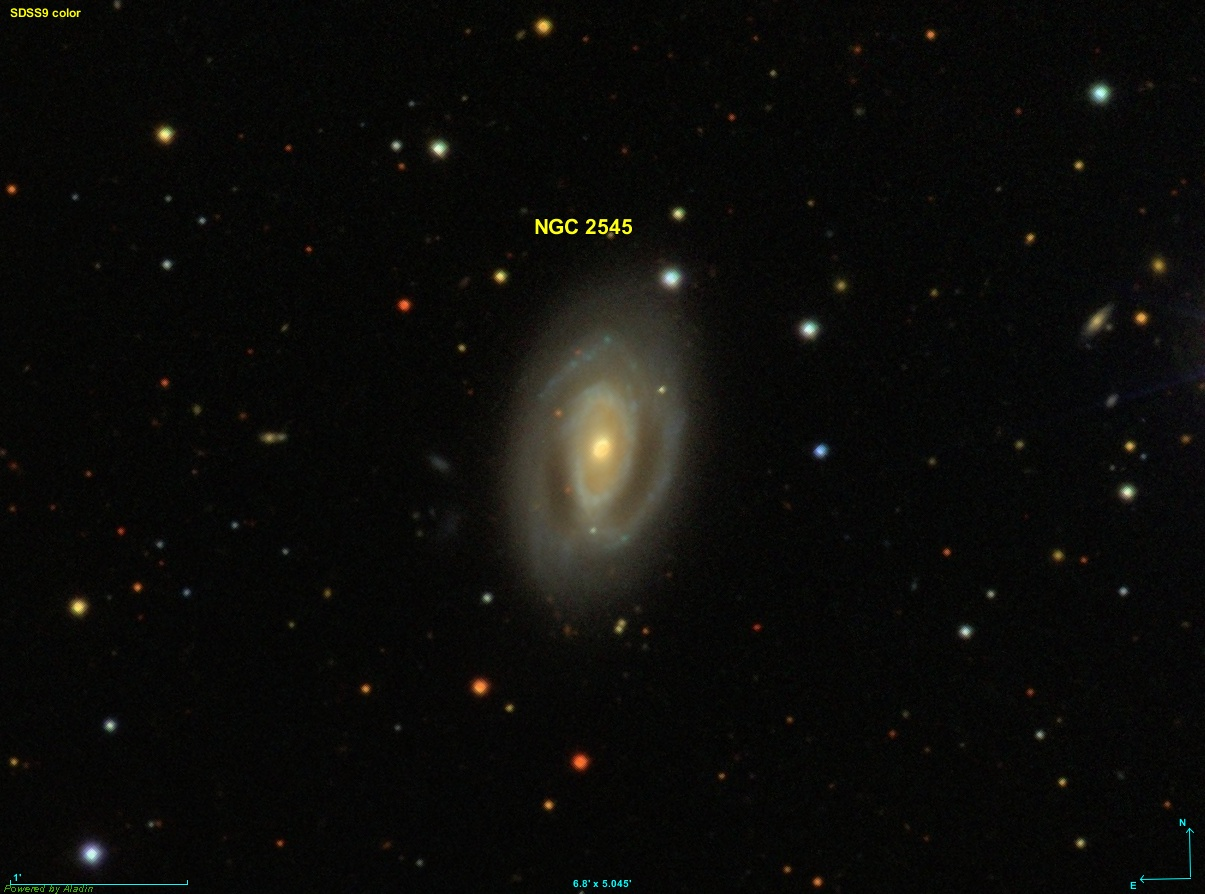
- NGC 2545 imaged by SDSS

Observation data (J2000 epoch)
- Constellation: Cancer
- Right ascension: 08^{h} 14^{m} 14.1505^{s}
- Declination: +21° 21′ 19.658″
- Redshift: 0.011291±0.00000900
- Heliocentric radial velocity: 3,385±3 km/s
- Distance: 158.97 ± 11.44 Mly (48.740 ± 3.507 Mpc)
- Group or cluster: NGC 2545 Group (LGG 156)
- Apparent magnitude (V): 13.4g

Characteristics
- Type: (R)SB(r)ab
- Size: ~115,600 ly (35.44 kpc) (estimated)
- Apparent size (V): 1.23′ × 1.09′

Other designations
- IRAS 08113+2130, 2MASX J08141413+2121198, UGC 4287, MCG +04-20-007, PGC 23086, CGCG 119-016

NGC 2545 is a barred spiral galaxy in the constellation of Cancer. Its velocity with respect to the cosmic microwave background is 3,613±16 km/s, which corresponds to a Hubble distance of 173.8 ± 12.2 Mly (53.29 ± 3.74 Mpc). Additionally, 15 non-redshift measurements give a closer distance of 158.97 ± 11.44 Mly (48.740 ± 3.507 Mpc). It was discovered by German-British astronomer William Herschel on 11 January 1787.

NGC 2545 has an active galactic nucleus, i.e. it has a compact region at the center of a galaxy that emits a significant amount of energy across the electromagnetic spectrum, with characteristics indicating that this luminosity is not produced by the stars. It is also a LINER galaxy, i.e. a galaxy whose nucleus has an emission spectrum characterized by broad lines of weakly ionized atoms.

== NGC 2545 group ==
NGC 2545 is a member of a group of galaxies named after it (also known as LGG 156). This group contains 5 galaxies, including NGC 2565, UGC 4308, CGCG 119-44, and CGCG 119-56.

== Supernova ==
One supernova has been observed in NGC 2545:

- SN 2008hn (Type Ic, mag. 18.4) was discovered by the Lick Observatory Supernova Search (LOSS) on 25 November 2008.

== See also ==
- List of NGC objects (2001–3000)
