= SDSS J0900+2234 FG =

Galaxy cluster

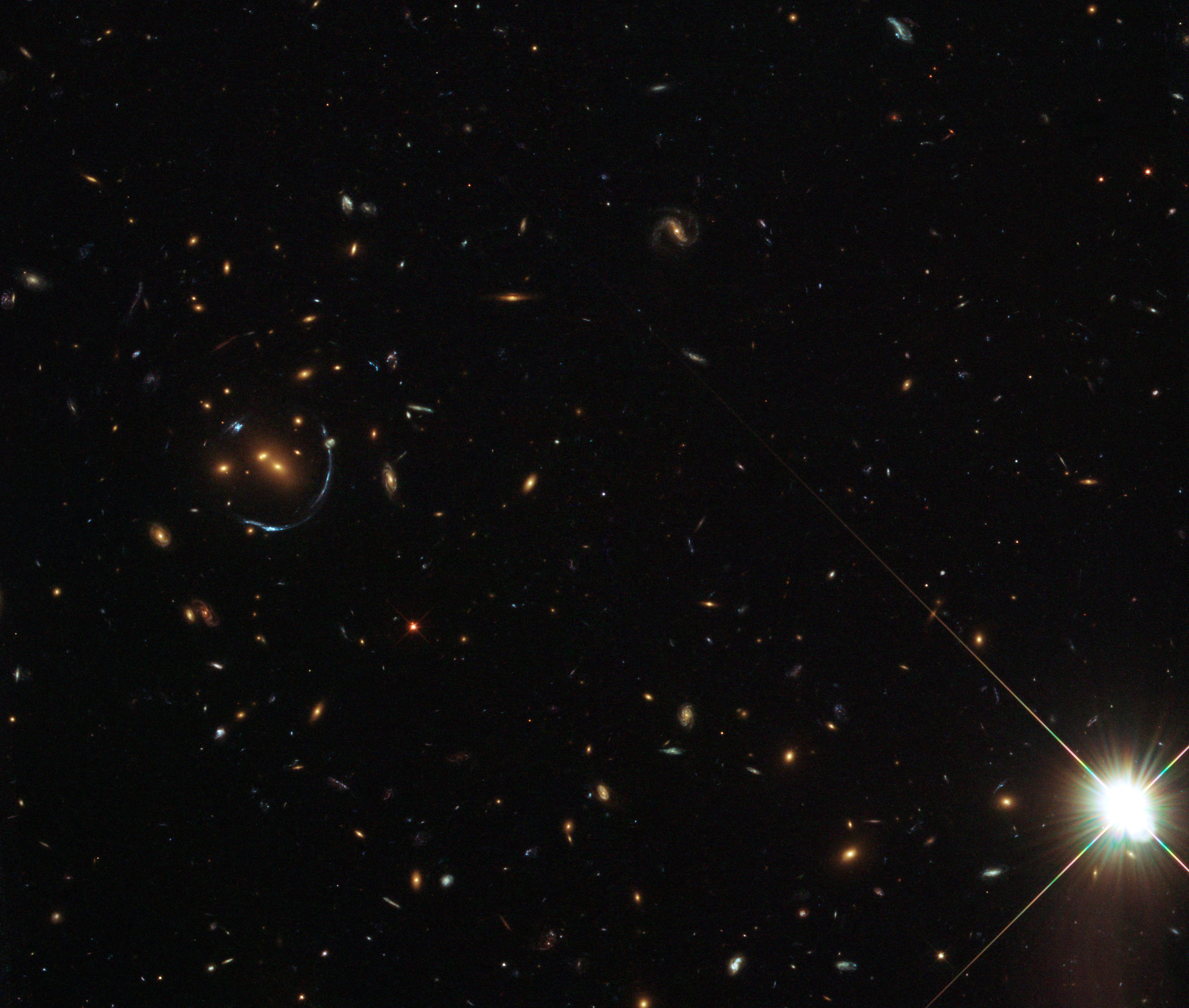
- SDSS J0900+2234 FG (Hubble Space Telescope)
- Object type: Galaxy cluster
- Other designations: [RRB2014] RM J090002.6+223410.5, GMBCG 135.01103+22.56803

Observation data (Epoch J2000)
- Constellation: Cancer
- Right ascension: 09^{h} 00^{m} 02.6^{s}
- Declination: +22° 34′ 04″
- Redshift: 0.4843

SDSS J0900+2234 FG is a galaxy cluster located in the direction of the constellation Cancer, at a distance of more than 4.7 billion light-years from Earth, corresponding to a comoving distance of 5.804 billion light-years.

The cluster is composed of 28 galaxies. The brightest member is SDSS J090002.64+223404.8, also known as LRG-4-606, where LRG stands for Luminous Red Galaxy, a class of galaxies cataloged by the Sloan Digital Sky Survey. These are typically massive elliptical galaxies composed predominantly of old stellar populations.

Around LRG-4-606, a gravitational lensing phenomenon is observed in the form of an incomplete ring, representing a distant background galaxy, SDSS J0900+2234 BG. The background galaxy has a redshift of z = 2.03, and is located at a light-travel distance of 10.088 billion light-years (comoving distance: 16.777 billion light-years). Its image is magnified and distorted by the gravitational field of the foreground cluster.

Images of this phenomenon were captured by the Hubble Space Telescope in 2011.

== See also ==
- Galaxy cluster
- Gravitational lens
