= NGC 2801 =

Galaxy in the constellation Cancer

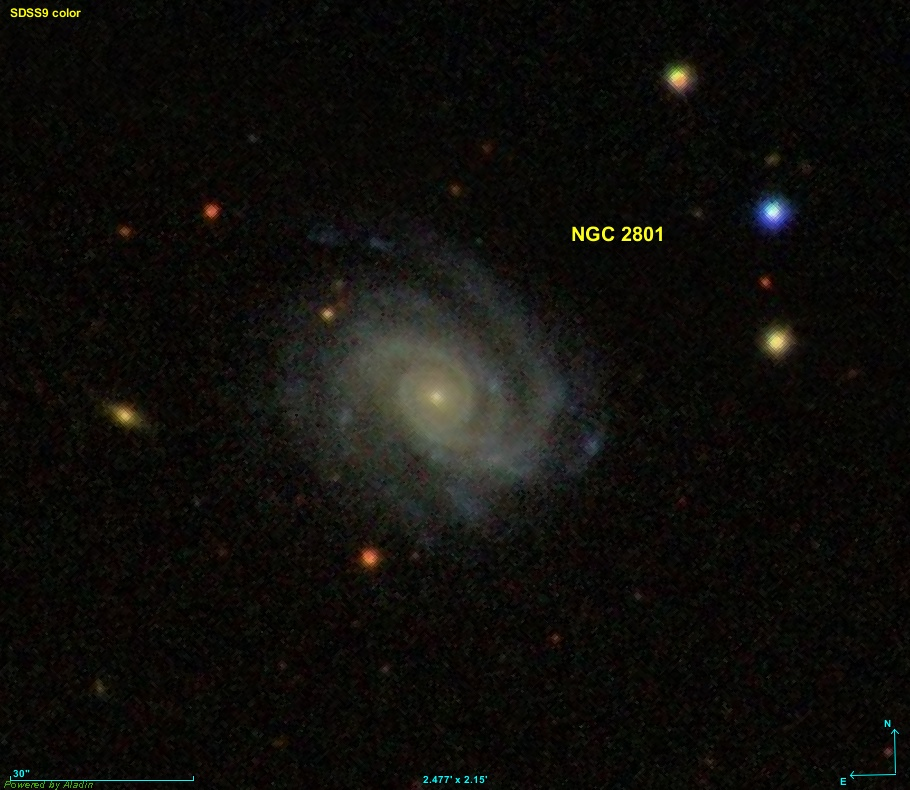
- SDSS image of NGC 2801

Observation data (J2000 epoch)
- Constellation: Cancer
- Right ascension: 09^{h} 16^{m} 44.2063^{s}
- Declination: +19° 56′ 08.535″
- Redshift: 0.025762
- Heliocentric radial velocity: 7723 ± 4
- Distance: 347.6 Mly (106.57 Mpc)
- Apparent magnitude (B): 15.30

Characteristics
- Type: SA(s)c
- Size: ~134,700 ly (41.30 kpc) (estimated)
- Apparent size (V): 1.1′ × 1.0′

Other designations
- UGC 4899, MCG +03-24-025, PGC 26183, CGCG 091-046

NGC 2801 is an unbarred spiral galaxy in the constellation Cancer. Its velocity with respect to the cosmic microwave background is 8011 ± 20 km/s, which corresponds to a Hubble distance of 385.4 ± 27.0 Mly (118.16 ± 8.28 Mpc). It was discovered February 17, 1865, by Albert Marth.

One supernova has been observed in NGC 2801: SN 2024vrr (type Ib, mag. 19.36).

== See also ==
- List of NGC objects (2001–3000)
