= NGC 2565 =

Galaxy in the constellation Cancer

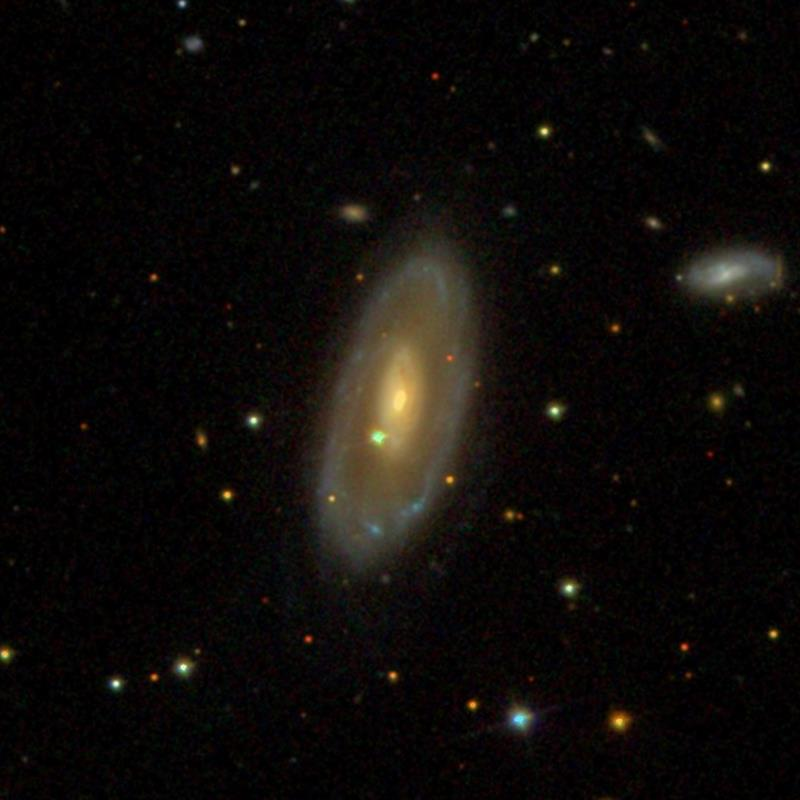
- NGC 2565 imaged by SDSS

Observation data (J2000 epoch)
- Constellation: Cancer
- Right ascension: 08^{h} 19^{m} 48.3092^{s}
- Declination: +22° 01′ 53.087″
- Redshift: 0.011948
- Heliocentric radial velocity: 3,582±1 km/s
- Distance: 183.5 ± 12.9 Mly (56.26 ± 3.95 Mpc)
- Group or cluster: NGC 2545 group (LGG 156)
- Apparent magnitude (V): 12.6

Characteristics
- Type: (R')SBbc?
- Size: ~106,600 ly (32.68 kpc) (estimated)
- Apparent size (V): 1.9′ × 0.9′

Other designations
- IRAS 08168+2211, UGC 4334, MCG +04-20-026, Mrk 386, PGC 23362, CGCG 119-057

NGC 2565 is a barred spiral galaxy in the constellation of Cancer. Its velocity with respect to the cosmic microwave background for is 3,814±16 km/s, which corresponds to a Hubble distance of 183.5 ± 12.9 Mly (56.26 ± 3.95 Mpc). Additionally, 34 non-redshift measurements give a distance of 169.79 ± 4.64 Mly (52.057 ± 1.422 Mpc). It was discovered by German-British astronomer J. Gerhard Lohse (bio-fr) in 1886.

NGC 2565 is a galaxy whose nucleus shines brightly in the ultraviolet. It is listed in the Markarian catalogue as Mrk 386.

NGC 2565 is surrounded by a ring, and is a starburst galaxy, as indicated by its entry in the NASA/IPAC Extragalactic Database.

== NGC 2545 Group ==
NGC 2565 is a member of the NGC 2545 group (also known as LGG 156). The other galaxies in the group are NGC 2545, UGC 4308, CGCG 119-044, and CGCG 119-56.

== Supernovae ==
Two supernovae have been observed in NGC 2565:

- SN 1960M (Type I, mag. 17) was discovered by Brazilian astronomer Alércio Moreira Gomes on 26 October 1960.
- SN 1992I (Type II, mag. 18) was discovered by French amateur astronomer Christian Buil on 29 February 1992.

== See also ==
- List of NGC objects (2001–3000)
