= NGC 2512 =

Spiral galaxy in the constellation Cancer

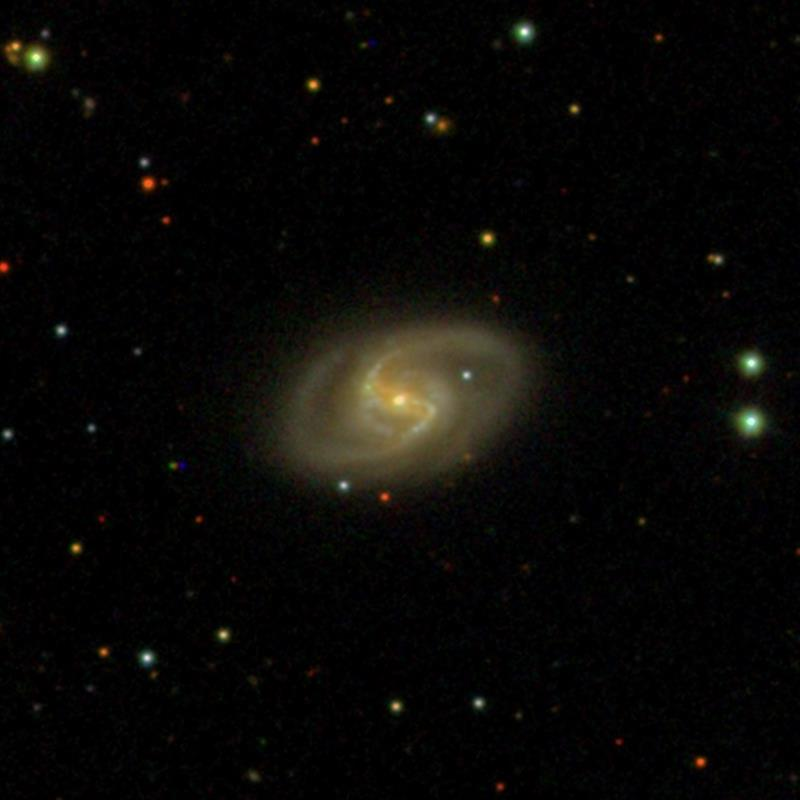

Observation data (J2000 epoch)
- Constellation: Cancer
- Right ascension: 08^{h} 03^{m} 07.8746^{s}
- Declination: +23° 23′ 30.559″
- Redshift: 0.015684
- Heliocentric radial velocity: 4702 ± 6 km/s
- Distance: 222.7 ± 15.5 Mly (68.30 ± 4.78 Mpc)
- Group or cluster: LDC 547
- Apparent magnitude (V): 13.1

Characteristics
- Type: SBb
- Apparent size (V): 1.75′ × 1.75′

Other designations
- UGC 04191, MRK 0384, CGCG 118-052, CGCG 0800.1+2332, PGC 22569

NGC 2512 is a spiral galaxy in the constellation of Cancer. It was discovered on February 10, 1787, by William Herschel.

== LDC 548 galaxy group ==
NGC 2512 is a member of the LDC 547 galaxy group, which contains a total of four member galaxies, including NGC 2486, NGC 2487, and NGC 2498.

== See also ==
- List of NGC objects (2001-3000)
- List of NGC objects
