= Paul Gerber =

German physicist

Paul Gerber (1854 Berlin, Germany – 13 August 1909 Freiburg im Breisgau, Germany) was a German physics teacher. He studied in Berlin from 1872 to 1875. In 1877 he became a teacher at the Realgymnasium (high school) in Stargard in Pommern. Gerber is known for his controversial work on the speed of gravity and the perihelion shift of Mercury's orbit.

== Gravitation ==
=== Basic concept ===
Based on the electrodynamic laws of Wilhelm Eduard Weber, Carl Friedrich Gauß, and Bernhard Riemann, between 1870 and 1900 many scientists tried to combine gravitation with a finite propagation speed and tried to derive the correct value for the perihelion shift of Mercury's orbit. (Note: Zenneck 1901, 46ff) (Note: Oppenheim 1920, 153ff) In 1890 Maurice Lévy succeeded in doing so by combining the laws of Weber and Riemann, whereby the speed of gravity is equal to the speed of light in his theory. (Note: Levy 1890) However, because the basic laws of Weber and others were wrong (for example, Weber's law was superseded by Maxwell's equations), those hypotheses were rejected.

A variation of those superseded theories (albeit not directly based on Weber's theory) was the one of Gerber, which he developed in 1898 and 1902. (Note: Gerber 1898, 1902) By assuming a finite speed of gravity, he developed the following expression for the gravitational potential:

$$V=\frac {\mu} {r \left(1- \frac {1} {c} \frac {dr} {dt} \right)^2}$$

Using the binomial theorem to second order it follows:

$$V=\frac {\mu} {r} \left[1+\frac {2} {c} \frac {dr} {dt} + \frac {3} {c^2} \left(\frac {dr} {dt} \right)^2 \right]$$

According to Gerber, the relation of the speed of gravity (c) and the perihelion shift (Ψ) is:

$$c^2=\frac {6\pi\mu} {a(1-\epsilon^2)\Psi}$$

where

$\mu=\frac {4\pi^2a^3} {\tau^2}$, ε = Eccentricity, a = Semi-major axis, τ = Orbital period.

So Gerber was able to calculate a speed of gravity of ca. 305 000 km/s, slightly more than the speed of light. (Note: Zenneck 1901, 49ff) (Note: Oppenheim 1920, 156f)

=== Controversy ===
Gerber's formula gives for the perihelion shift:

$$\Psi=24\pi^3\frac {a^2} {\tau^2 c^2(1-\epsilon^2)}$$

It was noted by the Einstein- and relativity critic Ernst Gehrcke in 1916, (Note: Gehrcke (1916)) that this formula is mathematically identical to Albert Einstein's formula (1915) for general relativity. (Note: Einstein (1915 and (1916), 822)

$\epsilon=24\pi^3\frac {a^2} {T^2c^2(1-e^2)}$, where e = Eccentricity, a = Semi-major axis, T = Orbital period.

So Gehrcke initiated a reprint of Gerber's 1902-paper in the Annalen der Physik in 1917, where he questioned the priority of Einstein and tried to prove a possible plagiarism by him. (Note: Gerber 1917) However, according to Albrecht Fölsing, (Note: Fölsing 1993, Chap. 5) Klaus Hentschel (Note: Hentschel 1990, pp.150ff.) and Roseveare, (Note: Roseveare 1982, Chap. 6) those claims were rejected, because soon after Gerber's paper was reprinted, scientists like Hugo von Seeliger, (Note: Seeliger (1917)) Max von Laue (Note: Laue (1917, 1920)) published some papers, where it was claimed that Gerber's theory is inconsistent and his formula is not the consequence of his premises. And Einstein wrote in 1920: (Note: Einstein 1920)

Mr. Gehrcke wants to make us believe that the perihelion shift of Mercury can be explained without the theory of relativity. So there are two possibilities. Either you invent special interplanetary masses. [...] Or you rely on a work by Gerber, who already gave the right formula for the perihelion shift of Mercury before me. The experts are not only in agreement that Gerber’s derivation is wrong through and through, but the formula cannot be obtained as a consequence of the main assumption made by Gerber. Mr. Gerber’s work is therefore completely useless, an unsuccessful and erroneous theoretical attempt. I maintain that the theory of general relativity has provided the first real explanation of the perihelion motion of Mercury. I did not mention the work by Gerber initially, because I did not know about it when I wrote my work on the perihelion motion of Mercury; even if I had been aware of it, I would not have had any reason to mention it. (Note: German: Herr Gehrcke will glauben machen, daß die Perihelbewegung des Merkur auch ohne Relativitätstheorie zu erklären sei. Es gibt da zwei Möglichkeiten. Entweder man erfindet besondere interplanetare Massen. [...] Oder aber man beruft sich auf eine Arbeit von Gerber, der die richtige Formel für die Perihelbewegung des Merkur bereits vor mir angegeben hat. Aber die Fachleute sind nicht nur darüber einig, daß Gerbers Ableitung durch und durch unrichtig ist, sondern die Formel ist als Konsequenz der von Gerber an die Spitze gestellten Annahmen überhaupt nicht zu gewinnen. Herrn Gerbers Arbeit ist daher völlig wertlos, ein mißglückter und irreparabler theoretischer Versuch. Ich konstatiere, daß die allgemeine Relativitätstheorie die erste wirkliche Erklärung für die Perihelbewegung des Merkur geliefert hat. Ich habe die Gerbersche Arbeit ursprünglich schon deshalb nicht erwähnt, weil ich sie nicht kannte, als ich meine Arbeit über die Perihelbewegung des Merkur schrieb; ich hätte aber auch keinen Anlaß gehabt, sie zu erwähnen, wenn ich von ihr Kenntnis gehabt hätte.)

In the recent past, Roseveare argued that Gerber's derivation is unclear, however, he claimed to have found the way by which Gerber possibly found his result (although Roseveare's derivation was criticized as well (Note: MathPages: Gerber's Gravity, Gerber’s Light Deflection)). More importantly, Roseveare showed that Gerber's theory is in conflict with experience: the value for the deflection of light in the gravitational field of the sun is too high in Gerber's theory, and if the relativistic mass is considered, also Gerber's prediction for the perihelion advance is wrong.
