= NGC 2803 =

Elliptical or lenticular galaxy in the constellation Cancer

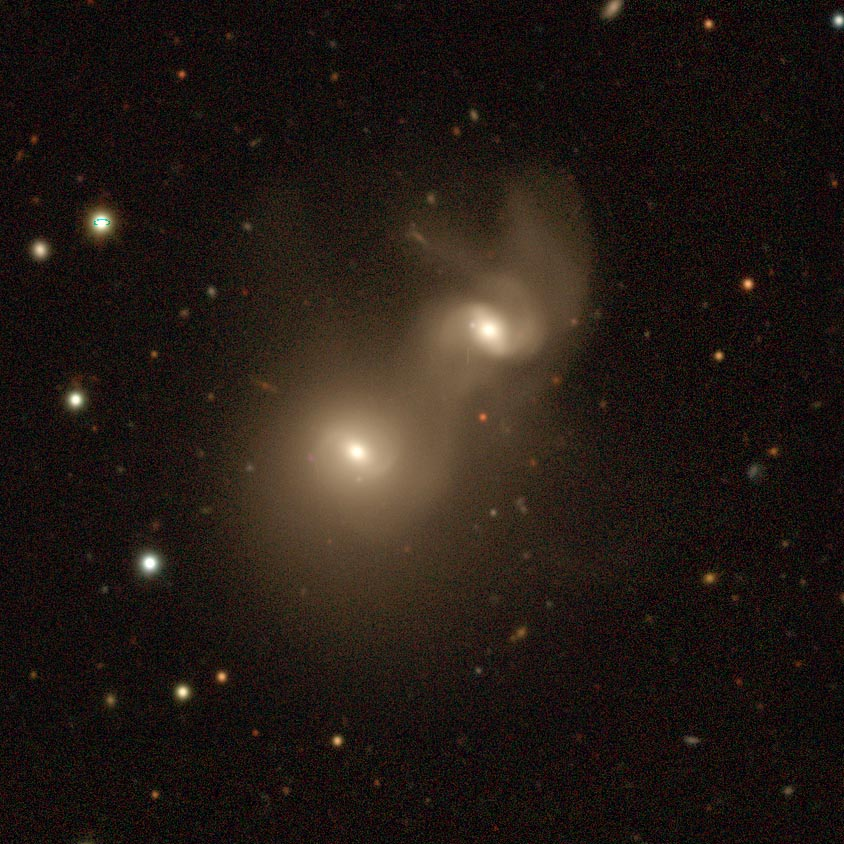
- NGC 2803 (lower left) and NGC 2802 (upper right) imaged by Legacy Surveys

Observation data (J2000 epoch)
- Constellation: Cancer
- Right ascension: 09^{h} 16^{m} 43.86892^{s}
- Declination: +18° 57′ 16.4866″
- Redshift: 0.030158
- Heliocentric radial velocity: 8905 km/s
- Distance: 411.1 Mly (126.04 Mpc)
- Apparent magnitude (V): 15.16

Characteristics
- Type: E-SB0

Other designations
- UGC 4898, MCG +03-24-027, PGC 26181

NGC 2803, also known as PCG 26181, is an elliptical or lenticular galaxy in the zodiac constellation Cancer. It was discovered by German-British astronomer William Herschel 21 March 1784. It is interacting with NGC 2802.

== Supernova ==
Two supernovae have been observed in NGC 2803:

- SN 2017ilf (Type Ia, mag. 18) was discovered by ASAS-SN on 22 November 2017.
- SN 2026afcx (Type Ia-91bg-like, mag. 17.73) was discovered by Ziyang Mai, Hongzhi Liang, and Zhenghan Xiong on 10 October 2026.
