= NGC 2797 =

Galaxy in the constellation Cancer

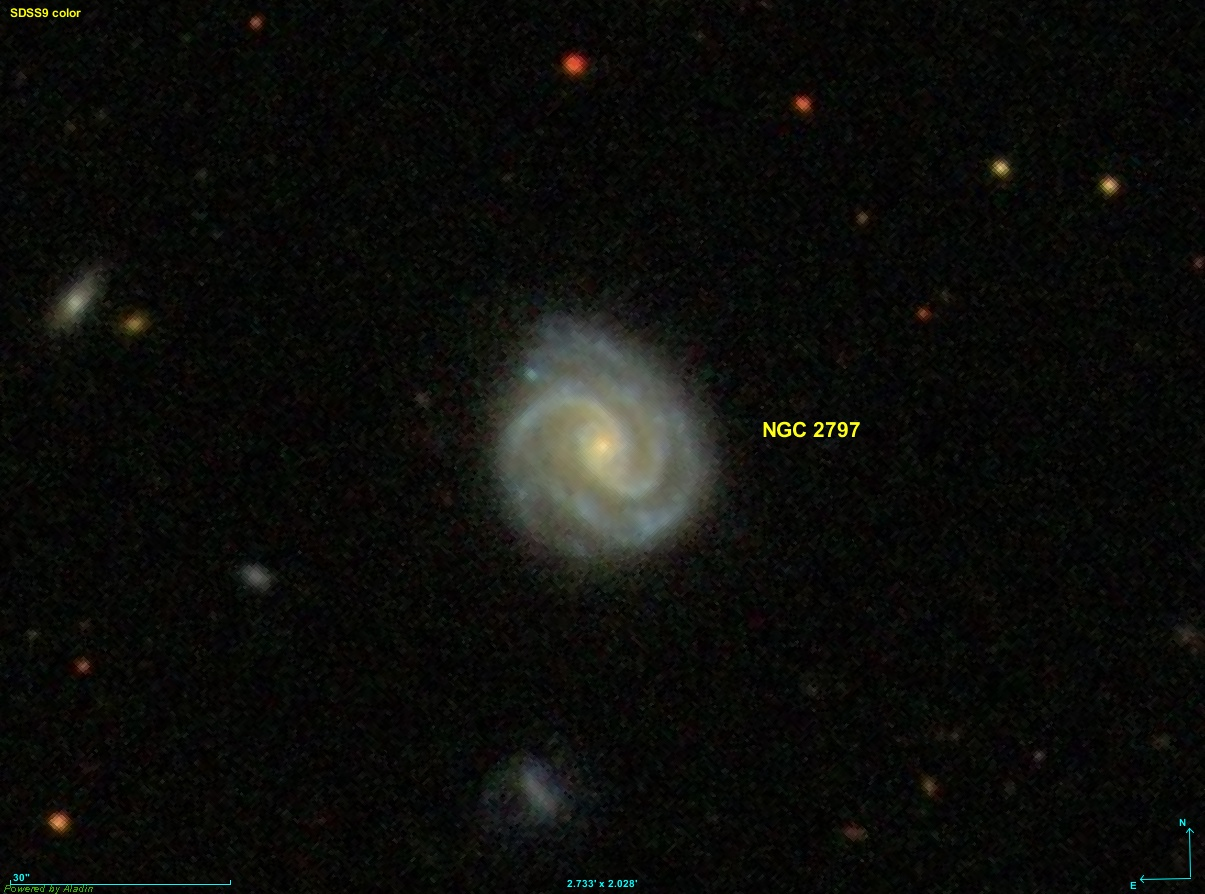
- NGC 2797 imaged by SDSS

Observation data (J2000 epoch)
- Constellation: Cancer
- Right ascension: 09^{h} 16^{m} 21.6700^{s}
- Declination: +17° 43′ 37.965″
- Redshift: 0.025961±0.0000111
- Heliocentric radial velocity: 7,783±3 km/s
- Distance: 388.5 ± 27.2 Mly (119.12 ± 8.34 Mpc)
- Apparent magnitude (V): 14.6g

Characteristics
- Type: SAB(rs)b
- Size: ~114,300 ly (35.03 kpc) (estimated)
- Apparent size (V): 0.68′ × 0.57′

Other designations
- IRAS 09135+1756, 2MASX J09162170+1743380, UGC 4891, MCG +03-24-023, PGC 26160, CGCG 091-042

NGC 2797 is an intermediate spiral galaxy in the constellation of Cancer. Its velocity with respect to the cosmic microwave background is 8,076±21 km/s, which corresponds to a Hubble distance of 388.5 ± 27.2 Mly (119.12 ± 8.34 Mpc). It was discovered by German astronomer Heinrich Louis d'Arrest on 15 March 1866.

== Supernovae ==
Two supernovae have been observed in NGC 2797.

- SN 2010Z (Type II, mag. 16.7) was discovered independently by the Lick Observatory Supernova Search (LOSS) on 3 February 2010, and by Simone Leonini on 8 February 2010.
- SN 2021aasl (Type Ia-91T, mag. 17.906) was discovered by ATLAS on 6 October 2021.

== See also ==
- List of NGC objects (2001–3000)
