= Mu1 Cancri =

Red giant star in the constellation Cancer

Mu^{1} Cancri
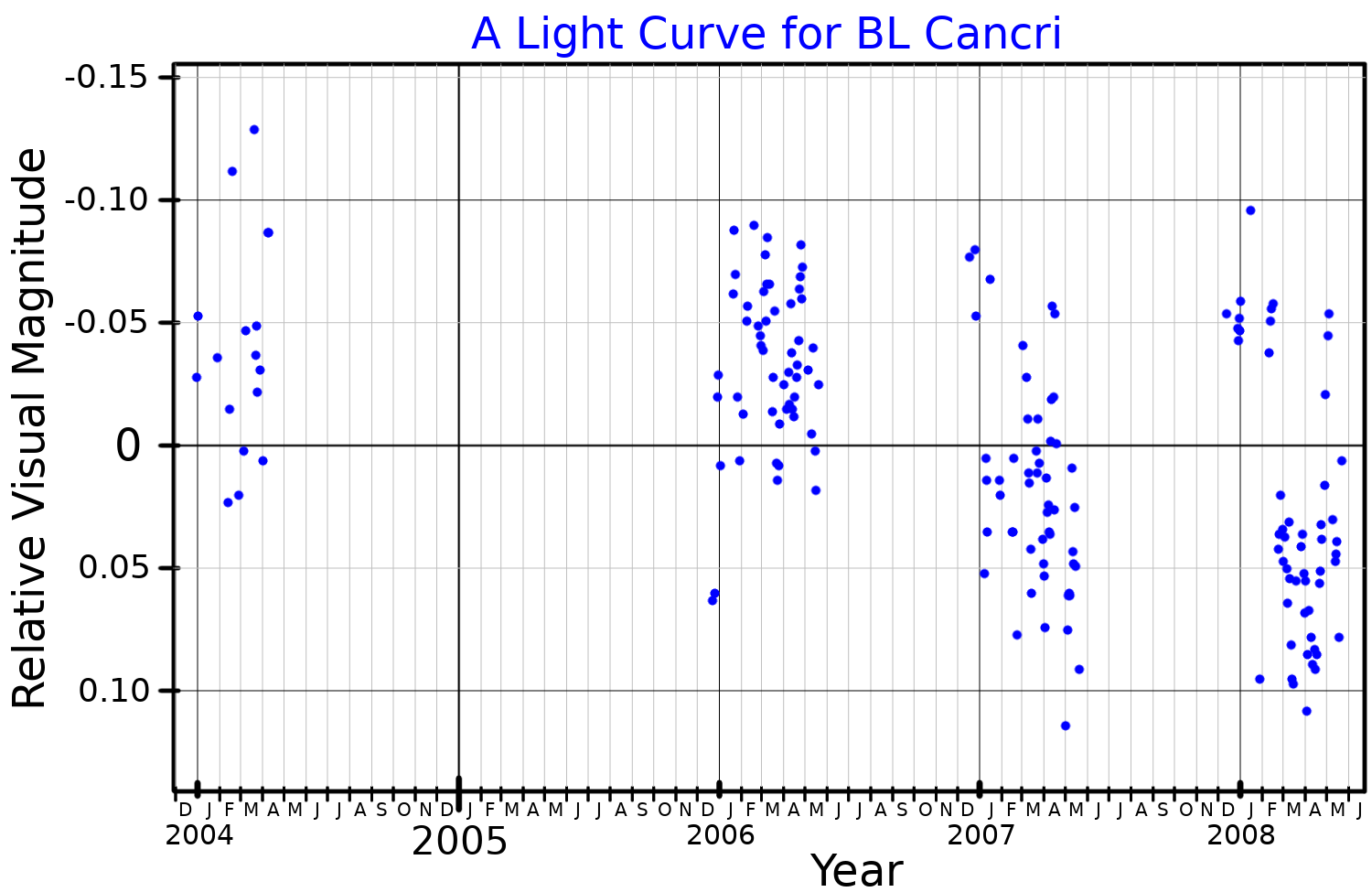
- A visual band light curve for BL Cancri, plotted from data presented by Tabur et al. (2009)

Observation data Epoch J2000.0 Equinox J2000.0 (ICRS)
- Constellation: Cancer
- Right ascension: 08^{h} 06^{m} 18.396^{s}
- Declination: +22° 38′ 07.76″
- Apparent magnitude (V): +5.99 (5.87–6.07)

Characteristics
- Evolutionary stage: Asymptotic giant branch
- Spectral type: M3 III
- B−V color index: +1.66
- Variable type: Lb

Astrometry
Radial velocity (R_{v})	+29.61±0.57 km/s
Proper motion (μ)	RA: −5.831 mas/yr Dec.: −9.488 mas/yr
Parallax (π)	5.4293±0.1351 mas
Distance	600 ± 10 ly (184 ± 5 pc)
Absolute magnitude (M_{V})	−0.79

Details
Radius	56.5+4.8 −5.2 R_{☉}
Luminosity	565±21 L_{☉}
Surface gravity (log g)	0.441 cgs
Temperature	3,744+186 −150 K

Other designations
- μ^{1} Cnc, 9 Cancri, BL Cancri, BD+23°1887, HD 66875, HIP 39659, HR 3169, SAO 79940

Database references
SIMBAD	data

Mu^{1} Cancri, Latinised from μ^{1} Cancri, is a variable star in the zodiac constellation of Cancer. Its name is a Bayer designation that is Latinized from μ^{1} Cancri, and abbreviated Mu^{1} Cnc or μ^{1} Cnc. The "1" in the name is because (from Earth) it appears to be close to 10 Cancri, or Mu^{2} Cancri. It is also known by the variable star designation BL Cancri, or BL Cnc. This star is dimly visible to the naked eye with an apparent visual magnitude that ranges from 5.87 down to 6.07. The position of the star near the ecliptic means it is subject to lunar occultations.

Parallax measurements put this star at about 600 light-years (184 parsecs) from the Sun. At that distance, the visual magnitude is diminished by an extinction factor of 0.28 due to interstellar dust. It is drifting further away with a line of sight velocity of +30 km/s.

The star Mu^{1} Cancri is an evolved red giant currently on the asymptotic giant branch with a stellar classification of M3 III. The lack of technetium-99 in the spectrum indicates it has not yet gone through third dredge-up. The star has expanded to 57 times the radius of the Sun and it is radiating 565 times the Sun's luminosity from its enlarged photosphere at an effective temperature of 3,774 K.

In 1967, Olin J. Eggen announced his discovery that Mu^{1} Cancri is a variable star. It was given its variable star designation in 1972. It is a slow irregular variable with thermal pulsation periods of 22.6, 37.8 and 203.7 days.
