= Omicron2 Cancri =

Star in the constellation Cancer

Omicron^{2} Cancri
- Image of the debris disk with the REASONS survey

Observation data Epoch J2000.0 Equinox J2000.0 (ICRS)
- Constellation: Cancer
- Right ascension: 08^{h} 57^{m} 35.200^{s}
- Declination: +15° 34′ 52.63″
- Apparent magnitude (V): +5.67

Characteristics
- Evolutionary stage: main sequence
- Spectral type: F0 IV
- B−V color index: +0.204

Astrometry
Radial velocity (R_{v})	−1.71±0.18 km/s
Proper motion (μ)	RA: +60.077 mas/yr Dec.: +20.781 mas/yr
Parallax (π)	20.4546±0.0523 mas
Distance	159.5 ± 0.4 ly (48.9 ± 0.1 pc)
Absolute magnitude (M_{V})	+2.58

Details
Mass	1.72±0.01 M_{☉}
Radius	1.62±0.08 R_{☉}
Luminosity	10.30±0.43 L_{☉}
Surface gravity (log g)	4.25 cgs
Temperature	7,868 K
Metallicity [Fe/H]	+0.2 dex
Rotational velocity (v sin i)	90.5±4.5 km/s
Age	300 Myr

Other designations
- ο^{2} Cnc, 63 Cancri, BD+16°1864, GC 12380, HD 76582, HIP 44001, HR 3565, SAO 98250

Database references
SIMBAD	data

Omicron^{2} Cancri is a solitary, yellow-white-hued star in the zodiac constellation of Cancer. Its name is a Bayer designation that is Latinized from ο^{2} Cancri, and abbreviated Omicron^{2} Cnc or ο^{2} Cnc. With an apparent visual magnitude of +5.67, it is dimly visible to the naked eye on a dark night. Based upon an annual parallax shift of 20.45 mas as seen from Earth, this star is located around 150 light-years from the Sun. It most likely forms a co-moving pair with Omicron^{1} Cancri.

With a stellar classification of F0 IV, this presents as an F-type subgiant star that has left the main sequence and is evolving toward the giant stage. Other authors give it a spectral class of A7V and evolutionary models place it on the main sequence. It is estimated to be roughly 300 million years old with a relatively high rotation rate, as shown by a projected rotational velocity of around 90.5 km/s. With 1.72 times the mass of the Sun and 1.62 times the Sun's radius, it is radiating 10.3 times the solar luminosity from its photosphere at an effective temperature of 7,868 K.

The star has an infrared excess, suggesting it surrounded by a circumstellar debris disk. Modelling of this structure indicates there are three distinct components, consisting of belts orbiting at distances of about 20 AU, 80 AU and 270 AU from the central star. They are inclined at an angle of 64° to the line of sight along a position angle of 103°. The gaps between the belts are most likely maintained by orbiting planets.
