= 24 Cancri =

Triple star system in the constellation Cancer

Observation data Epoch J2000 Equinox ICRS
- Constellation: Cancer
- 24 Cnc A
- Right ascension: 08^{h} 26^{m} 39.791^{s}
- Declination: +24° 32′ 03.02″
- Apparent magnitude (V): 6.89
- 24 Cnc BC
- Right ascension: 08^{h} 26^{m} 40.068^{s}
- Declination: +24° 32′ 05.33″
- Apparent magnitude (V): 7.47

Characteristics
- Spectral type: F0V / F7V
- U−B color index: +0.06
- B−V color index: +0.30

Astrometry
Radial velocity (R_{v})	15.4±3.0 km/s

24 Cnc A
Proper motion (μ)	RA: −43.008 mas/yr Dec.: −78.521 mas/yr
Parallax (π)	14.4288±0.0238 mas
Distance	226.0 ± 0.4 ly (69.3 ± 0.1 pc)

Orbit
Period (P)	21.78±0.20 yr
Semi-major axis (a)	0.149±0.001″
Eccentricity (e)	0.079±0.009
Inclination (i)	19.1±1.0°
Longitude of the node (Ω)	153.6±5.0°
Periastron epoch (T)	B 1998.42±0.30
Argument of periastron (ω) (secondary)	51.0±10.0°

Details

24 Cnc A
Mass	1.5 M_{☉}
Radius	1.6 R_{☉}
Luminosity	6.3 L_{☉}
Surface gravity (log g)	4.17 cgs
Temperature	7,331 K
Metallicity [Fe/H]	−0.49 dex
Age	770 Myr

Other designations
- 24 Cnc, BD+25°1920, HIP 41389, ADS 6811 AB, CCDM J08267+2432AB
- 24 Cnc A: HD 71152, HR 3312, SAO 80184
- 24 Cnc B: HD 71153, HR 3313, SAO 80185

Database references
SIMBAD	24 Cnc
- 24 Cnc A
- 24 Cnc B

24 Cancri (abbreviated to 24 Cnc) is a triple star system in the constellation Cancer. The system is located about 226 light-years (69 parsecs) away, based on its parallax. The system has a combined apparent magnitude of 6.5, and the two components A and B are separated by 5.7″.

The primary component in the star system is designated 24 Cancri A. It is a F-type main sequence star.

The secondary component, designated 24 Cancri B, is also a F-type main-sequence star and is itself a binary with an orbital period of about 22 years. The stars are identical, with apparent magnitudes of 8.6 and masses of 1.1 M_{☉}, and they are separated by 0.15″.
