= Omicron1 Cancri =

Star in the constellation Cancer

Omicron^{1} Cancri
Observation data Epoch J2000.0 Equinox J2000.0 (ICRS)
- Constellation: Cancer
- Right ascension: 08^{h} 57^{m} 14.950^{s}
- Declination: +15° 19′ 21.96″
- Apparent magnitude (V): +5.20

Characteristics
- Evolutionary stage: main sequence
- Spectral type: A5 III
- B−V color index: +0.1540

Astrometry
Radial velocity (R_{v})	−4.6±2.8 km/s
Proper motion (μ)	RA: +60.732 mas/yr Dec.: +20.396 mas/yr
Parallax (π)	20.3294±0.0891 mas
Distance	160.4 ± 0.7 ly (49.2 ± 0.2 pc)
Absolute magnitude (M_{V})	+1.92

Details
Mass	2.02 M_{☉}
Radius	1.86 R_{☉}
Luminosity	13.4 L_{☉}
Surface gravity (log g)	3.982^{+0.008}_{−0.005} cgs
Temperature	8,145±3 K
Metallicity [Fe/H]	−0.85^{+0.09}_{−0.04} dex
Rotational velocity (v sin i)	90 km/s
Age	598 Myr

Other designations
- ο^{1} Cnc, 62 Cancri, BD+15°1945, HD 76543, HIP 43970, HR 3561, SAO 98247

Database references
SIMBAD	data

Omicron^{1} Cancri is a solitary, white-hued star in the zodiac constellation of Cancer. Its name is a Bayer designation that is Latinized from ο^{1} Cancri, and abbreviated Omicron^{1} Cancri or ο^{1} Cnc. This star is faintly visible to the naked eye with an apparent visual magnitude of +5.20. Based upon an annual parallax shift of 20.33 mas as seen from Earth, it is located 160 light-years (49 pc) away from the Sun. It most likely forms a co-moving pair with Omicron^{2} Cancri.

With a stellar classification of A5 III, this presents as an evolved, A-type giant star. At the age of about 600 million years, it has double the mass of the Sun and 1.86 times the Sun's radius. Omicron^{1} Cancri is radiating 13.4 times the solar luminosity from its photosphere at an effective temperature of about 8,145 K. It has a high rate of spin, showing a projected rotational velocity of 90 km/s.

Omicron^{1} Cancri has an infrared excess, indicating it surrounded by a circumstellar debris disk. The signature matches a two-component disk with the spatially separated belts having temperatures of 146 K and 81 K.
