= Retarded position =

Aspect in general relativity

Einstein's equations admit gravity wave-like solutions. In the case of a moving point-like mass and in the linearized limit of a weak-gravity approximation these solutions of the Einstein equations are known as the Liénard–Wiechert gravitational potentials. Wave-like solutions (variations) in gravitational field at any point of space at some instant of time t are generated by the mass taken in the preceding (or retarded) instant of time s < t on its world-line at a vertex of the null cone connecting the mass and the field point. The position of the mass that generates the field is called the retarded position and the Liénard–Wiechert potentials are called the retarded potentials. Gravitational waves caused by acceleration of a mass appear to come from the position and direction of the mass at the time it was accelerated (the retarded time and position). The retarded time and the retarded position of the mass are a direct consequence of the finite value of the speed of gravity, the speed with which gravitational waves propagate in space.

As in the case of the Liénard–Wiechert potentials for electromagnetic effects and waves, the static potentials from a moving gravitational mass (i.e., its simple gravitational field, also known as gravitostatic field) are "updated," so that they point to the mass's actual position at constant velocity, with no retardation effects. This happens also for static electric and magnetic effects and is required by Lorentz symmetry, since any mass or charge moving with constant velocity at a great distance, could be replaced by a moving observer at the same distance, with the object now at "rest." In this latter case, the static gravitational field seen by the observer would be required to point to the same position, which is the non-retarded position of the object (mass). Only gravitational waves, caused by acceleration of a mass, and which cannot be removed by a change in a distant observer's inertial frame, must be subject to aberration, and thus originate from a retarded position and direction, due to their finite velocity of travel from their source. Such waves correspond to electromagnetic waves radiated from an accelerated charge.

Note that for gravitational masses moving past each other in straight lines (or for that matter for electromagnetically charged objects), there is little or no retardation effect on the effect from them, which is mediated by "static" components of the fields. So long as no radiation is emitted, conservation of momentum requires that forces between objects (either electromagnetic or gravitational forces) point at objects' instantaneous and up-to-date positions, and not in the direction of their speed-of-light-delayed (retarded) positions. However, since no information can be transmitted from such an interaction, such influences (which seem to exceed that of the influence of light), cannot be used to violate principles of relativity.

== See also ==
- Faster than light
- Liénard–Wiechert potential
