= Speed of gravity =

Physical constant equal to the speed of light

Exact values
- metres per second: 299792458

Approximate values (to three significant digits)
- kilometres per hour: 1080000000
- miles per second: 186000
- miles per hour: 671000000
- astronomical units per day: 173 (Note: Exact value: (299792458 × 60 × 60 × 24 / 149597870700) AU/day)
- parsecs per year: 0.307 (Note: Exact value: (999992651π / 10246429500) pc/y)

Approximate light signal travel times
- Distance: Time
- one foot: 1.0 ns
- one metre: 3.3 ns
- from geostationary orbit to Earth: 119 ms
- the length of Earth's equator: 134 ms
- from Moon to Earth: 1.3 s
- from Sun to Earth (1 AU): 8.3 min
- one light year: 1.0 year
- one parsec: 3.26 years
- from nearest star to Sun (1.3 pc): 4.2 years
- from the nearest galaxy (the Canis Major Dwarf Galaxy) to Earth: 25000 years
- across the Milky Way: 100000 years
- from the Andromeda Galaxy to Earth: 2.5 million years

In classical theories of gravitation, the changes in a gravitational field propagate. A change in the distribution of energy and momentum of matter results in subsequent alteration, at a distance, of the gravitational field which it produces. In the relativistic sense, the "speed of gravity" refers to the speed of a gravitational wave, which, as predicted by general relativity and confirmed by observation of the GW170817 neutron star merger, is equal to the speed of light (c).

== Modern understanding ==
The speed of gravitational waves in the general theory of relativity is equal to the speed of light in vacuum, c. Within the theory of special relativity, the constant c is not only about light; instead it is the highest possible speed for any interaction in nature. Formally, c is a conversion factor for changing the unit of time to the unit of space. This makes it the only speed which does not depend either on the motion of an observer or a source of light and / or gravity. Thus, the speed of "light" is also the speed of gravitational waves, and further the speed of any massless particle. Such particles include the gluon (carrier of the strong force), the photons that make up light (hence carrier of electromagnetic force), and the hypothetical gravitons (which are the presumptive field particles associated with gravity; however, an understanding of the graviton, if it exists, requires an as-yet unavailable theory of quantum gravity).

== Static fields ==
The speed of physical changes in a gravitational or electromagnetic field should not be confused with "changes" in the behavior of static fields that are due to pure observer-effects. These changes in direction of a static field are, because of relativistic considerations, the same for an observer when a distant charge is moving, as when an observer (instead) decides to move with respect to a distant charge. Thus, constant motion of an observer with regard to a static charge and its extended static field (either a gravitational or electric field) does not change the field. For static fields, such as the electrostatic field connected with electric charge, or the gravitational field connected to a massive object, the field extends to infinity, and does not propagate. Motion of an observer does not cause the direction of such a field to change, and by symmetrical considerations, changing the observer frame so that the charge appears to be moving at a constant rate, also does not cause the direction of its field to change, but requires that it continues to "point" in the direction of the charge, at all distances from the charge.

The consequence of this is that static fields (either electric or gravitational) always point directly to the actual position of the bodies that they are connected to, without any delay that is due to any "signal" traveling (or propagating) from the charge, over a distance to an observer. This remains true if the charged bodies and their observers are made to "move" (or not), by simply changing reference frames. This fact sometimes causes confusion about the "speed" of such static fields, which sometimes appear to change infinitely quickly when the changes in the field are mere artifacts of the motion of the observer, or of observation.

In such cases, nothing actually changes infinitely quickly, save the point of view of an observer of the field. For example, when an observer begins to move with respect to a static field that already extends over light years, it appears as though "immediately" the entire field, along with its source, has begun moving at the speed of the observer. This, of course, includes the extended parts of the field. However, this "change" in the apparent behavior of the field source, along with its distant field, does not represent any sort of propagation that is faster than light.

== Historical views ==
=== Newtonian gravitation ===
Isaac Newton's formulation of a gravitational force law requires that each particle with mass respond instantaneously to every other particle with mass irrespective of the distance between them. In modern terms, Newtonian gravitation is described by the Poisson equation, according to which, when the mass distribution of a system changes, its gravitational field instantaneously adjusts. Therefore, the theory assumes the speed of gravity to be infinite. This assumption was adequate to account for all phenomena with the observational accuracy of that time. It was not until the 19th century that an anomaly in astronomical observations which could not be reconciled with the Newtonian gravitational model of instantaneous action was noted: the French astronomer Urbain Le Verrier determined in 1859 that the elliptical orbit of Mercury precesses at a significantly different rate from that predicted by Newtonian theory.

=== Laplace ===
The first attempt to combine a finite gravitational speed with Newton's theory was made by Pierre-Simon Laplace in 1805. Based on Newton's force law he considered a model in which the gravitational field is defined as a radiation field or fluid. Changes in the motion of the attracting body are transmitted by some sort of waves. Therefore, the movements of the celestial bodies should be modified in the order v/c, where v is the relative speed between the bodies and c is the speed of gravity. The effect of a finite speed of gravity goes to zero as c goes to infinity, but not as 1/c^{2} as it does in modern theories. This led Laplace to conclude that the speed of gravitational interactions is at least 7×10^{6} times the speed of light. This velocity was used by many in the 19th century to criticize any model based on a finite speed of gravity, like electrical or mechanical explanations of gravitation.

Figure 1. One possible consequence of combining Newtonian Mechanics with a finite speed of gravity. If we assume a Fatio/Le Sage mechanism for the origin of gravity, the Earth spirals outwards with violation of conservation of energy and of angular momentum. In 1776, Laplace considered a different mechanism whereby gravity is caused by "the impulse of a fluid directed towards the centre of the attracting body". In such a theory, a finite speed of gravity results in the Earth spiraling inwards towards the Sun.

From a modern point of view, Laplace's analysis is incorrect. Not knowing about Lorentz invariance of static fields, Laplace assumed that when an object like the Earth is moving around the Sun, the attraction of the Earth would not be toward the instantaneous position of the Sun, but toward where the Sun had been if its position was retarded using the relative velocity (this retardation actually does happen with the optical position of the Sun, and is called annual solar aberration). Putting the Sun immobile at the origin, when the Earth is moving in an orbit of radius R with velocity v presuming that the gravitational influence moves with velocity c, moves the Sun's true position ahead of its optical position, by an amount equal to vR/c, which is the travel time of gravity from the sun to the Earth times the relative velocity of the sun and the Earth. As seen in Fig. 1, the pull of gravity (if it behaved like a wave, such as light) would then always be displaced in the direction of the Earth's velocity, so that the Earth would always be pulled toward the optical position of the Sun, rather than its actual position. This would cause a pull ahead of the Earth, which would cause the orbit of the Earth to spiral outward. Such an outspiral would be suppressed by an amount v/c compared to the force which keeps the Earth in orbit; and since the Earth's orbit is observed to be stable, Laplace's c must be very large. As is now known, it may be considered to be infinite in the limit of straight-line motion, since as a static influence it is instantaneous at distance when seen by observers at constant transverse velocity. For orbits in which velocity (direction of speed) changes slowly, it is almost infinite.

The attraction toward an object moving with a steady velocity is towards its instantaneous position with no delay, for both gravity and electric charge. In a field equation consistent with special relativity (i.e., a Lorentz invariant equation), the attraction between static charges moving with constant relative velocity is always toward the instantaneous position of the charge (in this case, the "gravitational charge" of the Sun), not the time-retarded position of the Sun. When an object is moving in orbit at a steady speed but changing velocity v, the effect on the orbit is order v^{2}/c^{2}, and the effect preserves energy and angular momentum, so that orbits do not decay.

=== Electrodynamical analogies ===
At the end of the 19th century, there were many attempts to combine Newton's force law with the established laws of electrodynamics, like those of Wilhelm Eduard Weber, Carl Friedrich Gauss, Bernhard Riemann and James Clerk Maxwell. Those theories are not invalidated by Laplace's critique, because although they are based on finite propagation speeds, they contain additional terms which maintain the stability of the planetary system. Those models were used to explain the perihelion advance of Mercury, but they could not provide exact values. One exception was Maurice Lévy in 1890, who succeeded in doing so by combining the laws of Weber and Riemann, whereby the speed of gravity is equal to the speed of light. However, those hypotheses were rejected.

However, a more important variation of those attempts was the theory of Paul Gerber, who derived in 1898 the identical formula, which was also derived later by Einstein for the perihelion advance. Based on that formula, Gerber calculated a propagation speed for gravity of 305000 km/s, i.e. practically the speed of light. But Gerber's derivation of the formula was faulty, i.e., his conclusions did not follow from his premises, and therefore many (including Einstein) did not consider it to be a meaningful theoretical effort. Additionally, the value it predicted for the deflection of light in the gravitational field of the sun was too high by the factor 3/2.

=== Aether theories ===
In 1900, Hendrik Lorentz tried to explain gravity on the basis of his ether theory and the Maxwell's equations. After proposing (and rejecting) a Le Sage type model, he assumed like Ottaviano-Fabrizio Mossotti and Johann Karl Friedrich Zöllner that the attraction of opposite charged particles is stronger than the repulsion of equal charged particles. The resulting net force is exactly what is known as universal gravitation, in which the speed of gravity is that of light. This leads to a conflict with the law of gravitation by Isaac Newton, in which it was shown by Laplace that a finite speed of gravity leads to some sort of aberration and therefore makes the orbits unstable. However, Lorentz showed that the theory is not concerned by Laplace's critique, because due to the structure of the Maxwell equations only effects in the order v^{2}/c^{2} arise. But Lorentz calculated that the value for the perihelion advance of Mercury was much too low. He wrote:

The special form of these terms may perhaps be modified. Yet, what has been said is sufficient to show that gravitation may be attributed to actions which are propagated with no greater velocity than that of light.

In 1908, Henri Poincaré examined the gravitational theory of Lorentz and classified it as compatible with the relativity principle, but (like Lorentz) he criticized the inaccurate indication of the perihelion advance of Mercury.

Henri Poincaré argued in 1904 that a propagation speed of gravity which is greater than c would contradict the concept of local time (based on synchronization by light signals) and the principle of relativity. He wrote:

What would happen if we could communicate by signals other than those of light, the velocity of propagation of which differed from that of light? If, after having regulated our watches by the optimal method, we wished to verify the result by means of these new signals, we should observe discrepancies due to the common translatory motion of the two stations. And are such signals inconceivable, if we take the view of Laplace, that universal gravitation is transmitted with a velocity a million times as great as that of light?

However, in 1905 Poincaré calculated that changes in the gravitational field can propagate with the speed of light if it is presupposed that such a theory is based on the Lorentz transformation. He wrote:

Laplace showed in effect that the propagation is either instantaneous or much faster than that of light. However, Laplace examined the hypothesis of finite propagation velocity ceteris non mutatis [all other things being unchanged]; here, on the contrary, this hypothesis is conjoined with many others, and it may be that between them a more or less perfect compensation takes place. The application of the Lorentz transformation has already provided us with numerous examples of this.

Similar models were also proposed by Hermann Minkowski (1907) and Arnold Sommerfeld (1910). However, those attempts were quickly superseded by Einstein's theory of general relativity. Whitehead's theory of gravitation (1922) explains gravitational red shift, light bending, perihelion shift and Shapiro delay.

== General relativity ==
=== Background ===
General relativity predicts that gravitational radiation should exist and propagate as a wave at lightspeed: a slowly evolving and weak gravitational field will produce, according to general relativity (GR), effects like those of Newtonian gravitation (it does not depend on the existence of gravitons, mentioned above, or any similar force-carrying particles).

Suddenly displacing one of two gravitoelectrically interacting particles would, after a delay corresponding to lightspeed, cause the other to feel the displaced particle's absence: accelerations due to the change in quadrupole moment of star systems, like the Hulse–Taylor binary, have removed much energy (almost 2% of the energy of our own Sun's output) as gravitational waves, which would theoretically travel at the speed of light.

In GR, gravity is described by a tensor of degree two, which, in the weak gravity limit, can be described by the gravitoelectromagnetism approximation. In the following discussion the diagonal components of the tensor would be termed gravitoelectric components, and the other components will be termed gravitomagnetic.

Two gravitoelectrically interacting particle ensembles, e.g., two planets or stars moving at constant velocity with respect to each other, each feel a force toward the instantaneous position of the other body without a speed-of-light delay because Lorentz invariance demands that what a moving body in a static field sees and what a moving body that emits that field sees be symmetrical.

A moving body's seeing no aberration in a static field emanating from a "motionless body" therefore means Lorentz invariance requires that in the previously moving body's reference frame the (now moving) emitting body's field lines must not at a distance be retarded or aberred. Moving charged bodies (including bodies that emit static gravitational fields) exhibit static field lines that do not bend with distance and show no speed of light delay effects, as seen from bodies moving relative to them.

In other words, since the gravitoelectric field is, by definition, static and continuous, it does not propagate. If such a source of a static field is accelerated (for example stopped) with regard to its formerly constant velocity frame, its distant field continues to be updated as though the charged body continued with constant velocity. This effect causes the distant fields of unaccelerated moving charges to appear to be "updated" instantly for their constant velocity motion, as seen from distant positions, in the frame where the source-object is moving at constant velocity. However, as discussed, this is an effect which can be removed at any time, by transitioning to a new reference frame in which the distant charged body is now at rest.

The static and continuous gravitoelectric component of a gravitational field is not a gravitomagnetic component (gravitational radiation); see Petrov classification. The gravitoelectric field is a static field and therefore cannot superluminally transmit quantized (discrete) information, i.e., it could not constitute a well-ordered series of impulses carrying a well-defined meaning (this is the same for gravity and electromagnetism).

=== Aberration of field direction in general relativity, for a weakly accelerated observer ===
The finite speed of gravitational interaction in general relativity does not lead to the sorts of problems with the aberration of gravity that Newton was originally concerned with, because there is no such aberration in static field effects. Because the acceleration of the Earth with regard to the Sun is small (meaning, to a good approximation, the two bodies can be regarded as traveling in straight lines past each other with unchanging velocity), the orbital results calculated by general relativity are the same as those of Newtonian gravity with instantaneous action at a distance, because they are modelled by the behavior of a static field with constant-velocity relative motion, and no aberration for the forces involved. Although the calculations are considerably more complicated, one can show that a static field in general relativity does not suffer from aberration problems as seen by an unaccelerated observer (or a weakly accelerated observer, such as the Earth). Analogously, the "static term" in the electromagnetic Liénard–Wiechert potential theory of the fields from a moving charge does not suffer from either aberration or positional-retardation. Only the term corresponding to acceleration and electromagnetic emission in the Liénard–Wiechert potential shows a direction toward the time-retarded position of the emitter.

It is in fact not very easy to construct a self-consistent gravity theory in which gravitational interaction propagates at a speed other than the speed of light, which complicates discussion of this possibility.

=== Formulaic conventions ===
In general relativity the metric tensor symbolizes the gravitational potential, and Christoffel symbols of the spacetime manifold symbolize the gravitational force field. The tidal gravitational field is associated with the curvature of spacetime.

== Measurements ==
For the reader who desires a deeper background, a comprehensive review of the definition of the speed of gravity and its measurement with high-precision astrometric and other techniques appears in the textbook Relativistic Celestial Mechanics in the Solar System.

=== PSR 1913+16 orbital decay ===
The speed of gravity (more correctly, the speed of gravitational waves) can be calculated from observations of the orbital decay rate of binary pulsars PSR 1913+16 (the Hulse–Taylor binary system noted above) and PSR B1534+12. The orbits of these binary pulsars are decaying due to loss of energy in the form of gravitational radiation. The rate of this energy loss ("gravitational damping") can be measured, and since it depends on the speed of gravity, comparing the measured values to theory shows that the speed of gravity is equal to the speed of light to within 1%. However, according to parameterized post-Newtonian formalism setting, measuring the speed of gravity by comparing theoretical results with experimental results will depend on the theory; use of a theory other than that of general relativity could in principle show a different speed, although the existence of gravitational damping at all implies that the speed cannot be infinite.

=== Jovian occultation of QSO J0842+1835 (contested) ===
In September 2002, Sergei Kopeikin and Edward Fomalont announced that they had measured the speed of gravity indirectly, using their data from very-long-baseline interferometry measurement of the retarded position of Jupiter on its orbit during Jupiter's transit across the line-of-sight of the bright radio source quasar QSO J0842+1835. Kopeikin and Fomalont concluded that the speed of gravity is between 0.8 and 1.2 times the speed of light, which would be fully consistent with the theoretical prediction of general relativity that the speed of gravity is exactly the same as the speed of light.

Several physicists, including Clifford M. Will and Steve Carlip, have criticized these claims on the grounds that they have allegedly misinterpreted the results of their measurements. Notably, prior to the actual transit, Hideki Asada in a paper to the Astrophysical Journal Letters theorized that the proposed experiment was essentially a roundabout confirmation of the speed of light instead of the speed of gravity.

It is important to keep in mind that none of the debaters in this controversy are claiming that general relativity is "wrong". Rather, the debated issue is whether or not Kopeikin and Fomalont have really provided yet another verification of one of its fundamental predictions.

Kopeikin and Fomalont, however, continue to vigorously argue their case and the means of presenting their result at the press conference of the American Astronomical Society (AAS) that was offered after the results of the Jovian experiment had been peer-reviewed by the experts of the AAS scientific organizing committee. In a later publication by Kopeikin and Fomalont, which uses a bi-metric formalism that splits the space-time null cone in two — one for gravity and another one for light — the authors claimed that Asada's claim was theoretically unsound. The two null cones overlap in general relativity, which makes tracking the speed-of-gravity effects difficult and requires a special mathematical technique of gravitational retarded potentials, which was worked out by Kopeikin and co-authors but was never properly employed by Asada and/or the other critics.

Stuart Samuel also argued that the experiment did not actually measure the speed of gravity because the effects were too small to have been measured. A response by Kopeikin and Fomalont challenges this opinion.

=== GW170817 and the demise of two neutron stars ===
The detection of GW170817 in 2017, the finale of a neutron star inspiral observed through both gravitational waves and gamma rays, at a distance of 130 million light years, currently provides by far the best limit on the difference between the speed of light and that of gravity. Photons were detected 1.7 seconds after peak gravitational wave emission; assuming a delay of zero to 10 seconds, the difference between the speeds of gravitational and electromagnetic waves, v_{GW} − v_{EM}, is constrained to between −3×10^{−15} and +7×10^{−16} times the speed of light. However, this conclusion has been challenged by independent research suggesting that astronomical observations of supernova SN 1987A and distant galaxies JADES are inconsistent with the assumption that the speed of gravity equals the speed of light.

This also excluded some alternatives to general relativity, including variants of scalar–tensor theory, instances of Horndeski's theory, and Hořava–Lifshitz gravity.
