= X Cancri =

Variable star in the constellation Cancer

- Location of X Cancri (circled)

Observation data Epoch J2000 Equinox ICRS
- Constellation: Cancer
- Right ascension: 08^{h} 55^{m} 22.88194^{s}
- Declination: +17° 13′ 52.5830″
- Apparent magnitude (V): 5.52 – 7.50

Characteristics
- Evolutionary stage: AGB
- Spectral type: C-N4.5 C_{2}5.5 MS3
- B−V color index: +2.975±0.039
- Variable type: SRb

Astrometry
Radial velocity (R_{v})	−5.0±0.7 km/s
Proper motion (μ)	RA: −2.076 mas/yr Dec.: +6.457 mas/yr
Parallax (π)	1.7500±0.0356 mas
Distance	1,860 ± 40 ly (570 ± 10 pc)
Absolute magnitude (M_{V})	−4.96

Details
Radius	208 R_{☉}
Luminosity	4,646 L_{☉}
Surface gravity (log g)	−0.014 cgs
Temperature	3,239 K
Metallicity [Fe/H]	−0.3 dex

Other designations
- X Cnc, BD+17°1973, GC 12322, HD 76221, HIP 43811, HR 3541, SAO 98230

Database references
SIMBAD	data

X Cancri is a variable star in the northern constellation of Cancer. It has a red hue and is visible to the naked eye at its brightest. The distance to this object is approximately 1,860 light years based on parallax measurements, but is drifting closer with a radial velocity of −5 km/s. It lies very close to the ecliptic and so is subject to lunar occultations.

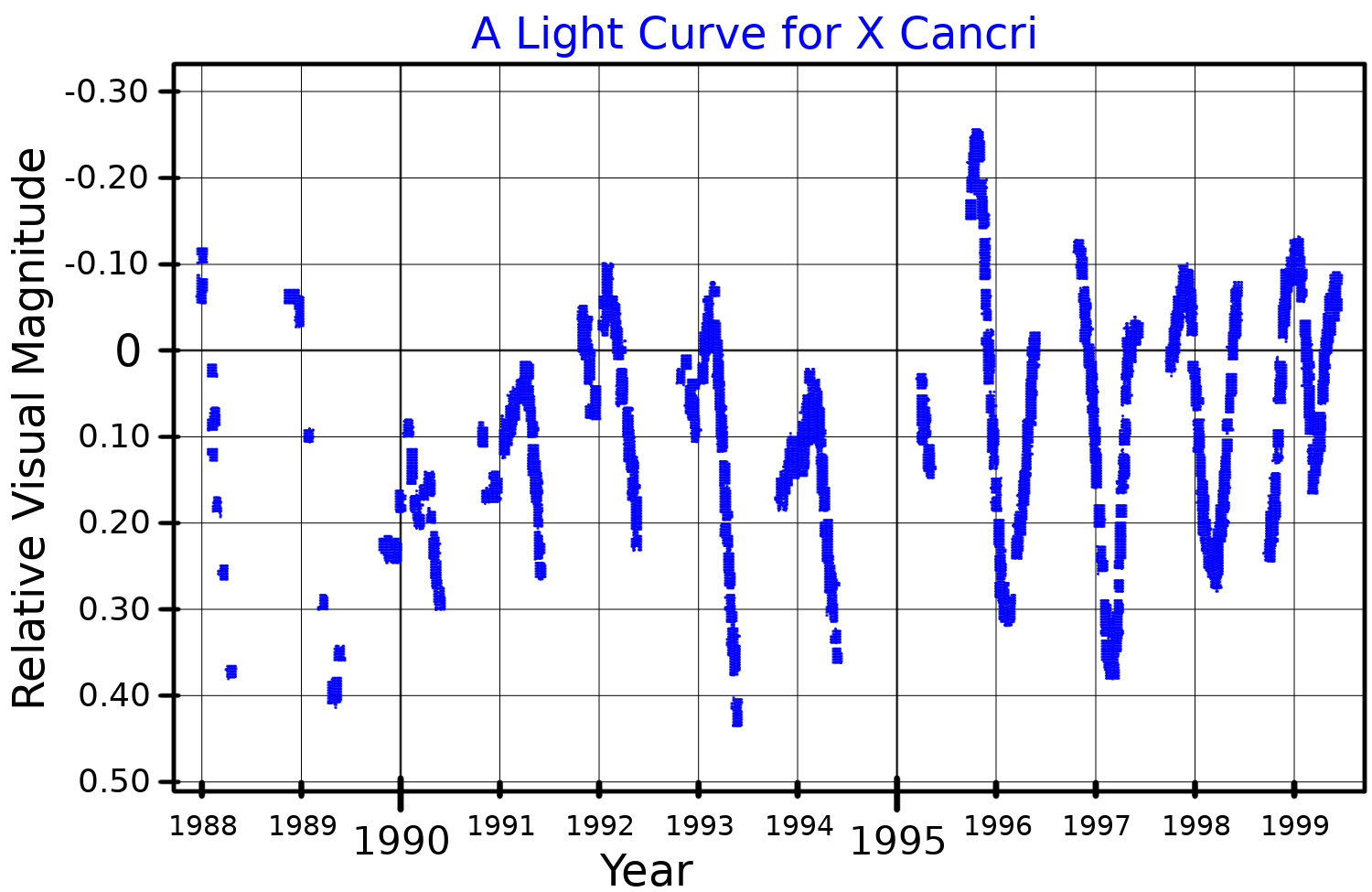
A visual band light curve for X Cancri, adapted from Percy et al. (2001)

John Birmingham reported that the star's brightness was probably variable, in 1871. In 1895, Thomas Espin confirmed that it is in fact a variable star. It was listed with its variable star designation, X Cancri, in Annie Jump Cannon's 1907 work Second Catalog of Variable Stars. This is a semiregular variable star of subtype SRb that ranges in brightness from visual magnitude 5.52 down to 7.50 with a period of 193 days. Fourier analysis has shown that the star also pulsates with periods of 350 and 1,870 days.

This object is a carbon star – an aging red giant star on the asymptotic giant branch that has a higher abundance of carbon than oxygen in its atmosphere – and is one of the brightest carbon stars in the sky. It has a carbon star spectral classification of C-N4.5 C_{2}5.5 MS3. The first C indicates that it is a carbon star, and the N5 that it is a fairly cool strongly red AGB star. The C_{2} index indicates the strength of the Swan bands on a scale of one to eight, which shows the relative abundance of carbon vs oxygen. The MS index, not to be confused with an MS spectral class, indicates the strength of the SiC_{2} bands on a scale of one to seven. These bands are thought to be very sensitive to temperature.

The angular diameter of X Cancri has been measured using both lunar occultations and very long baseline interferometry, both methods giving a diameter around 8 mas.
