= Upsilon2 Cancri =

Star in the constellation Cancer

Upsilon^{2} Cancri
Observation data Epoch J2000.0 Equinox J2000.0 (ICRS)
- Constellation: Cancer
- Right ascension: 08^{h} 33^{m} 00.104^{s}
- Declination: +24° 05′ 05.26″
- Apparent magnitude (V): +6.35

Characteristics
- Evolutionary stage: red giant branch
- Spectral type: G9 III
- U−B color index: +0.88
- B−V color index: +1.02

Astrometry
Radial velocity (R_{v})	+73.7±0.5 km/s
Proper motion (μ)	RA: −63.482 mas/yr Dec.: −46.082 mas/yr
Parallax (π)	5.251±0.025 mas
Distance	621 ± 3 ly (190.4 ± 0.9 pc)
Absolute magnitude (M_{V})	+1.13

Details
Mass	3.50±0.04 M_{☉}
Radius	15.18^{+0.31}_{−0.27} R_{☉}
Luminosity	110±1 L_{☉}
Surface gravity (log g)	2.43±0.11 cgs
Temperature	4,881±44 K
Metallicity [Fe/H]	0.00±0.05 dex
Rotational velocity (v sin i)	2.7 km/s
Age	250^{+24}_{−23} Myr

Other designations
- υ^{2} Cnc, 32 Cancri, BD+24°1946, HD 72324, HIP 41940, HR 3369, SAO 80245

Database references
SIMBAD	data

Upsilon^{2} Cancri is a yellow-hued star in the zodiac constellation of Cancer. Its name is a Bayer designation that is Latinized from υ^{2} Cancri, and abbreviated Upsilon^{2} Cnc or υ^{2} Cnc. This star is near the lower brightness limit of stars that can be viewed with the naked eye, having an apparent visual magnitude of +6.35. Based upon an annual parallax shift of 5.1325 mas as seen from Earth's orbit, this system is approximately 621 light-years (190 pc) away. It is drifting further from the Sun with a line of sight velocity of +74 km/s. The position of this star near the ecliptic means it is subject to lunar occultation.

At an age of 250 million years, this is an evolved G-type giant star with a stellar classification of G9 III. It has 3.5 times the mass of the Sun but has expanded to 15 times the Sun's radius. The star is radiating 110 times the Sun's luminosity from its swollen photosphere at an effective temperature of 4,881 K. It is spinning with a projected rotational velocity of 2.7 km/s. Upsilon^{2} Cancri is a member of the Epsilon Indi Moving Group of stars that share a common motion through space.
