= Upsilon1 Cancri =

Star in the constellation Cancer

Upsilon^{1} Cancri
Observation data Epoch J2000.0 Equinox J2000.0 (ICRS)
- Constellation: Cancer
- Right ascension: 08^{h} 31^{m} 30.519^{s}
- Declination: +24° 04′ 51.99″
- Apparent magnitude (V): +5.694

Characteristics
- Spectral type: F0 IIIn
- B−V color index: +0.309

Astrometry
Radial velocity (R_{v})	+19.0±4.3 km/s
Proper motion (μ)	RA: −80.791 mas/yr Dec.: −44.858 mas/yr
Parallax (π)	13.6180±0.0415 mas
Distance	239.5 ± 0.7 ly (73.4 ± 0.2 pc)
Absolute magnitude (M_{V})	+1.29

Details
Mass	1.47 M_{☉}
Radius	3.20±0.02 R_{☉}
Luminosity	25 L_{☉}
Surface gravity (log g)	3.51 cgs
Temperature	7,240±246 K
Rotational velocity (v sin i)	109.2 km/s
Age	570 Myr

Other designations
- υ^{1} Cnc, 30 Cancri, BD+24°1940, FK5 2666, HD 72041, HIP 41816, HR 3355, SAO 80229

Database references
SIMBAD	data

Upsilon^{1} Cancri is a solitary, yellow-white-hued star in the constellation Cancer. Its name is a Bayer designation that is Latinized from υ^{1} Cancri, and abbreviated Upsilon^{1} Cnc or υ^{1} Cnc. This star is faintly visible to the naked eye, having an apparent visual magnitude of +5.7. Based upon an annual parallax shift of 13.62 mas as seen from Earth, this system is 240 light-years (73 pc) distant from the Sun. It is drifting further away with a line of sight velocity of +19 km/s.

This object has a stellar classification of F0 IIIn, presenting as an F-type giant star. The 'n' suffix indicates "nebulous" absorption lines due to rapid rotation, and it shows a relatively high projected rotational velocity of 109.2 km/s. It is a variable star of unknown type that changes brightness with an amplitude of 0.05 magnitude. The star is about 570 million years old and is spinning rapidly with a projected rotational velocity of 109.2 km/s. It has an estimated mass of 1.47 times that of the Sun and 3.2 times the Sun's radius. On average, it is radiating 25 times the Sun's luminosity from its photosphere at an effective temperature of 7,240 K.
