= Edward Fomalont =

American astronomer

Edward Fomalont (born May 14, 1940) is an American scientist working at the National Radio Astronomy Observatory. He specializes in radio galaxies, X-ray binary systems, astrometry, and general relativity. He has published more than 330 papers in peer-reviewed journals and proceedings of scientific conferences.

In 1975, Fomalont and Richard Sramek made a first radio-interferometric occultation experiment to test the theory of general relativity by measuring the bending of microwave radiation in the gravitational field of the Sun. Fomalont and colleagues made the most precise VLBI test of general relativity in 2005 that had reached precision of few parts in 10,000.

In 2002, Fomalont and Sergei Kopeikin claimed to have measured the speed of gravity in the dedicated experiment by observing the tangential component in the gravitational bending of light of a quasar caused by the orbital motion of Jupiter with respect to the barycenter of the Solar System. This claim was disputed but vigorously defended by Kopeikin and Fomalont in a number of subsequent publications.

Fomalont is an active participant in many international radio interferometric projects including the VLBI Space Observatory Programme and Square Kilometre Array.

== Bibliometric information ==
As of March 2024, the NASA ADS database yields a h index of 77, with more than 22737 non-self citations. The tori index and riq index are 99.8 and 163, respectively.
