= Star Names =

Book by Richard Hinckley Allen

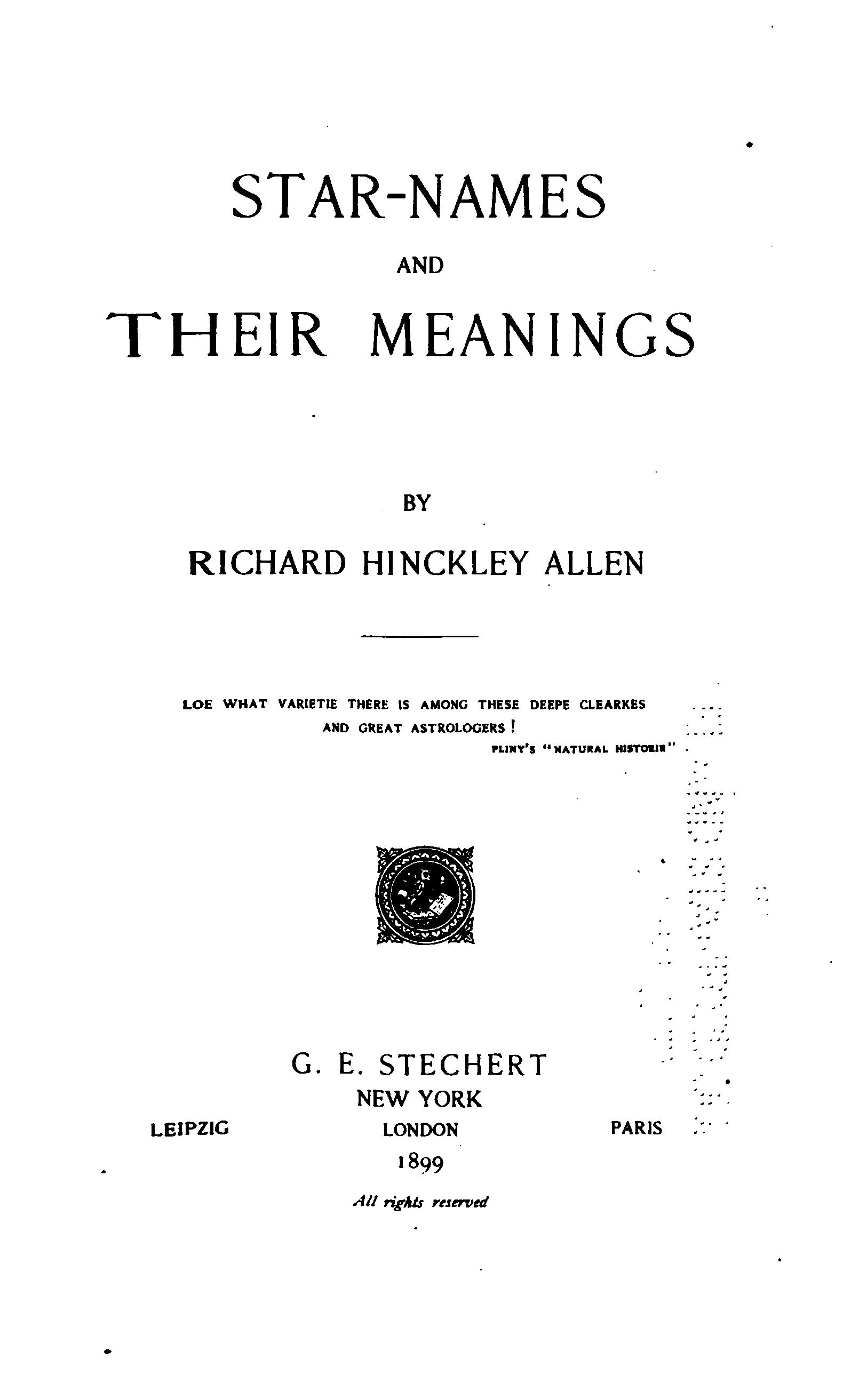
- First edition title page
- Author: Richard Hickney Allen
- Publisher: G. E. Stechert
- Publication date: 1899

Star-Names and Their Meanings (retitled Star Names: Their Lore and Meaning in some later reprints) is an 1899 book by Richard Hinckley Allen, that discusses the names of stars, constellations, and their histories.

== Background and authorship ==
Richard Hinckley Allen (1838, near Buffalo, New York – 1908, Northampton, Massachusetts) was a youthful polymath with interests in "nature, astronomy, ornithology, and literature" whom his classmates described as "the walking encyclopedia"; after a college year spent at Yale, a pursuit abandoned because of problems with his eyesight, he traveled and then "joined his father’s export trade business". Allen's interest in astronomy, and in star names in particular, may have been stimulated by his coming across such a name with which he was unfamiliar, after which "[h]e spent many years researching astronomical nomenclature... primarily for personal enjoyment". With the encouragement of professors from Yale and Princeton, and from personal friends, Allen proceeded to publish the information he had gathered—as Star-Names and Their Meanings in 1899.

The main-belt asteroid 20177 Richardallen was named after him in 2026.

== Content ==
First published in 1899 as Star-Names and Their Meanings, this work collected the origins of the names of stars and constellations from a panoply of sources, some primary but most secondary. It also briefly retells the various myths and folklore connected with stars in the Greco-Roman tradition, as well as in the Arabic, Babylonian, Indian and Chinese traditions (for which, however, some modern criticism having taken it to task, claiming it to be largely superseded).

The book also provides some cursory details about astronomy, at the knowledge level of the end of the 19th century. Similarly, astrology and its history are dealt with briefly in the introduction, and some other basic astrological references (although downplayed) are scattered throughout the book.

== Reception ==
Late historian of astronomy Paul Kunitzsch notes that the "book may be taken as a handbook summing up the state of knowledge arrived at by his time," but that to standards current to his 1979 publication, it was generally unreliable with regard to star names and their derivations. Science fiction writers/editors Algis Budrys and Frederik Pohl called Star Names "a fine book (but hardly 'hammock reading')", in a 1965 review. In an assessment by amateur classicist Bill Thayer, the book was presented as mostly accurate in its explanations of Greek and Latin star names, although containing minor historical errors, and overestimates of the age of some Greek temples. It was also criticised with regard to star names by Gary D. Thompson, an amateur astronomer who maintains its discussion of Arabic, Mesopotamian, and Egyptian constellations and star names are likewise especially unreliable.

== See also ==
- History of the constellations
