= Maurice Lévy =

French engineer (1838–1910)

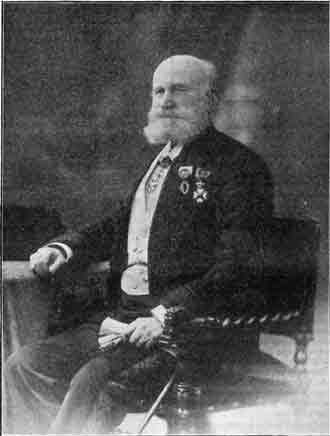
- Maurice Lévy
- Born: 28 February 1838; Ribeauvillé, Alsace
- Died: 30 September 1910 (aged 72); Paris, France
- Education: École Polytechnique
- Scientific career
- Fields: Engineering

Maurice Lévy (February 28, 1838, in Ribeauvillé – September 30, 1910, in Paris) was a French engineer and member of the Institut de France.

Lévy was born in Ribeauvillé in Alsace. Educated at the École Polytechnique, where he was a student of Adhémar Jean Claude Barré de Saint-Venant, and the École des Ponts et Chaussées, he became an engineer in 1863. During the Franco-Prussian War (1870–1871), he was entrusted by the Government of National Defense with the control of part of the artillery. During the next decade he held several educational positions, becoming professor at the École Centrale in 1875, member of the commission of the geodetic survey of France in 1879, and professor at the Collège de France in 1885.

== Total strain theory ==
Lévy changed the assumption, "the directions of principal strains coincide with those of the principal stresses", stated by Saint-Venant, to "the directions of increments of principal strains coincide with those of the principal stresses" and that was also the first attempt of using an incremental flow rule.

In 1888 Lévy inaugurated a system of boat-traction by means of overhead cables. A trial system was installed between Joinville-le-Pont and Saint-Maurice; it consisted of an endless cable which was kept in motion by powerful steam-engines and to which boats were attached and thus kept at a speed of four kilometers an hour. The system proved unsatisfactory, however.

== Selected works ==
Lévy is the author of several works, including:

- "La Statique Graphique et Ses Applications à l'Art des Constructions" (1874; 2d ed. 1887);
- "Sur le Principe d'Énergie" (1888);
- "Étude des Moyens de Traction des Bateaux: Le Halage Funiculaire" (with M. G. Pavie, 1894)

Lévy also wrote papers on kinematics, mechanics, physical mathematics, geometry, etc., in the "Comptes rendus de l'Académie des sciences", the "Journal de l'École Polytechnique", and the "Journal de Mathématiques Pures et Appliquées".

Lévy was an officer of the Legion of Honor and of public instruction, and a member of the Academy of Sciences and of the Royal Academy of Sciences of Rome.
