= Sergei Kopeikin =

Theoretical physicist and astronomer

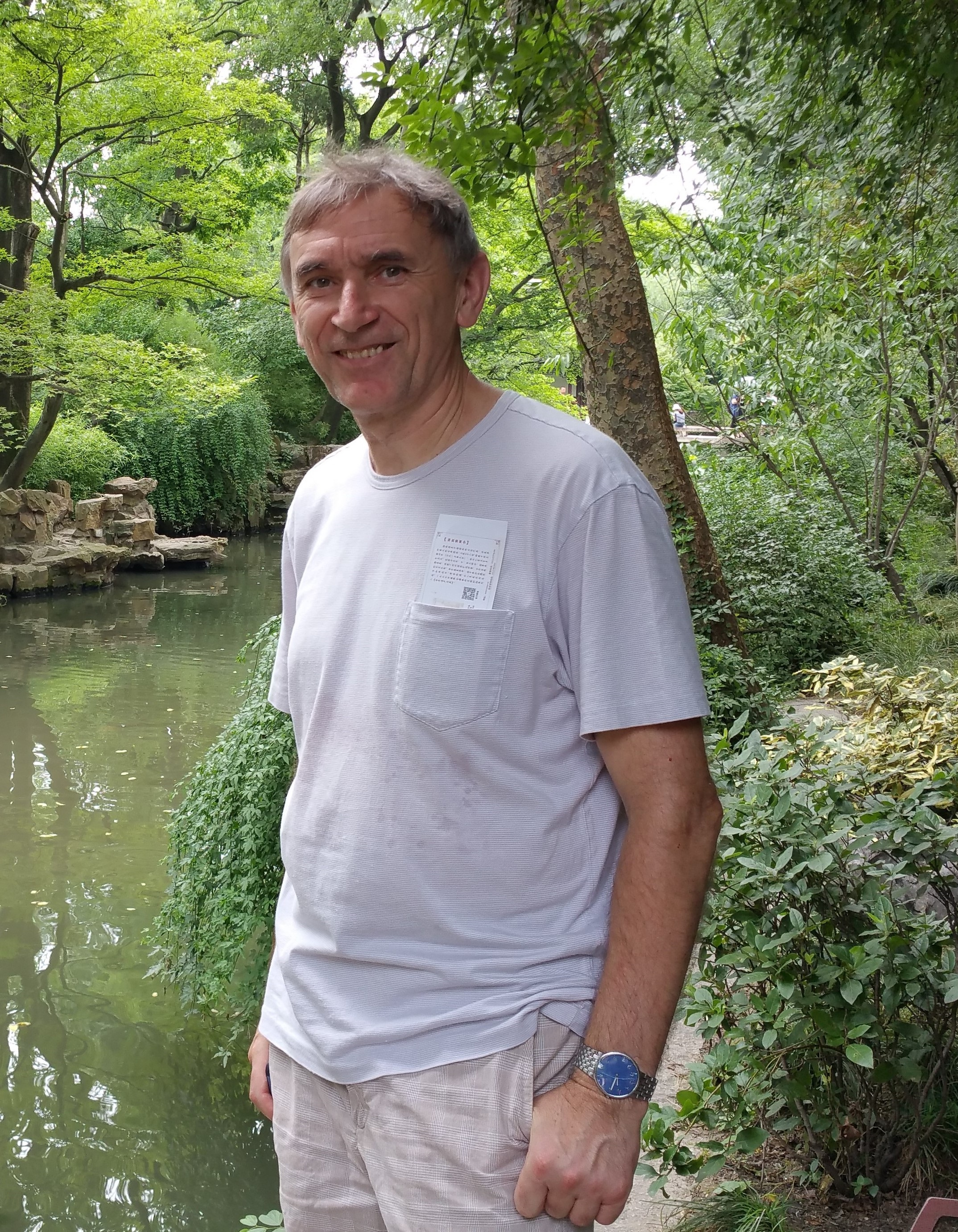
- Born: April 10, 1956 (age 70); Kashin, USSR
- Education: Moscow State University; Sternberg Astronomical Institute
- Known for: Research in Relativity and Gravitation and for Tests of General Relativity including the speed of gravity, pulsar timing, gravitomagnetism, cosmology, VLBI and relativistic geodesy
- Scientific career
- Fields: Theoretical Physics; General Relativity; Gravitational Waves; Cosmology; Astrophysics; Celestial Mechanics; Astrometry; Geodesy; Metrology
- Workplaces: University of Missouri-Columbia
- Thesis: General Relativistic Equations of Binary Motion for Extended Bodies with Conservative Corrections and Radiation Damping (1986)
- Doctoral advisors: Yakov Borisovich Zel'dovich Leonid Petrovich Grishchuk

Notes
- Associate Editor: Frontiers in Astrophysics and Space Sciences; Editorial Board Member: Geodesy and Geodynamics

Sergei Kopeikin (born April 10, 1956) is a USSR-born theoretical physicist and astronomer presently living and working in the United States, where he holds the position of Professor of Physics at the University of Missouri in Columbia, Missouri. He specializes in the theoretical and experimental study of gravity and general relativity. He is also an expert in the field of the astronomical reference frames and time metrology. His general relativistic theory of the Post-Newtonian reference frames which he had worked out along with Victor A. Brumberg, was adopted in 2000 by the resolutions of the International Astronomical Union as a standard for reduction of ground-based astronomical observation. A computer program Tempo2 used to analyze radio observations of pulsars, includes several effects predicted by S. Kopeikin that are important for measuring parameters of the binary pulsars, for testing general relativity, and for detection of gravitational waves of ultra-low frequency. Sergei Kopeikin has worked out a complete post-Newtonian theory of equations of motion of N extended bodies in scalar-tensor theory of gravity with all mass and spin multipole moments of arbitrary order and derived the Lagrangian of the relativistic N-body problem.

In September 2002, S. Kopeikin led a team which conducted a high-precision VLBI experiment to measure the fundamental speed of gravity, thus, confirming the Einstein's prediction on the relativistic nature of gravitational field and its finite speed of propagation.

He is also involved in studies concerning the capabilities of the Lunar Laser Ranging (LLR) technique to measure dynamical features of the General Theory of Relativity in the lunar motion. He has critically analyzed the claims of other scientists concerning the possibility of LLR to measure the gravitomagnetic interaction. Kopeikin organized and chaired three international workshops on the advanced theory and model of the Lunar Laser Ranging experiment. The LLR workshops were held in the International Space Science Institute (Bern, Switzerland) in 2010-2012.

Recently, S. Kopeikin has been actively involved in theoretical studies on relativistic geodesy and applications of atomic clocks for high-precision navigation and in geodetic datum. He has provided an exact relativistic definition of geoid, and worked out the post-Newtonian concepts of the Maclaurin spheroid and normal gravity formula. S. Kopeikin's workshop on spacetime metrology, clocks and relativistic geodesy is held in the International Space Science Institute (Bern, Switzerland).

Kopeikin was born in Kashin, a small town near Moscow in what was then the USSR. He graduated with excellence from Department of Astrophysics of Moscow State University in 1983 where he studied general relativity under Leonid Grishchuk. In 1986, he obtained a Ph.D. in relativistic astrophysics from the Space Research Institute in Moscow. His Ph.D. thesis was advised by Yakov Borisovich Zel'dovich and presented a first general-relativistic derivation of the conservative and radiation reaction forces in the Post-Newtonian expansion of the gravitational field of a binary system of two extended, massive bodies. In 1991, he obtained a Doctor of Science degree in Physics and Mathematics from Moscow State University and moved to Tokyo (Japan) in 1993 to teach astronomy in Hitotsubashi University. He was adjunct staff member in National Astronomical Observatory of Japan in 1993-1996 and a visiting professor in the same observatory in 1996-1997. Kopeikin moved to Germany in 1997 and worked in the Institute for Theoretical Physics of Friedrich Schiller University of Jena and in Max Planck Institute for Radio Astronomy until 1999. He had joined Department of Physics and Astronomy of the University of Missouri in February 2000 where he got tenure in 2004.

He has been married to Zoia Kopeikina (daughter of Solomon Borisovich Pikelner) since 1980, they have four daughters, four granddaughters and three grandsons. As of December 2019 the family lives in Columbia, Missouri, Texas, Colorado and Minnesota.

== Bibliometric information ==
Kopeikin has published 207 scientific papers and 2 books. He was an editor of two other books on advances in relativistic celestial mechanics. According to Google Scholar Citations program, the h-index of S.M. Kopeikin is 43, his i10-index is 101, while the total number of citations is 6552. As of August 2025, NASA ADS returns for him an h-index of 33, while his tori and riq indices are 56.8 and 175, respectively.
