= NGC 3593 =

Galaxy in the constellation Leo

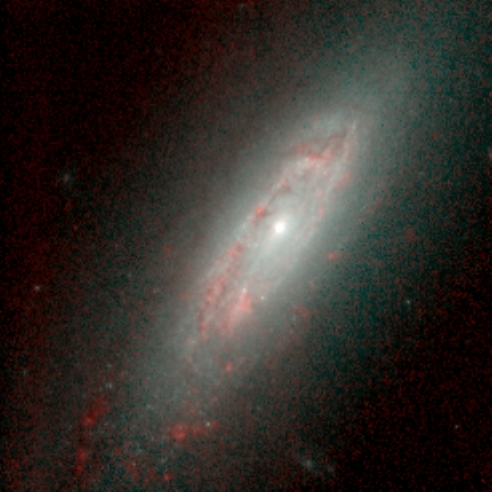
- An infrared Hubble Space Telescope (HST) image of NGC 3593.

Observation data (J2000 epoch)
- Constellation: Leo
- Right ascension: 11^{h} 14^{m} 37.002^{s}
- Declination: +12° 49′ 04.87″
- Redshift: 627 km/s
- Distance: 20.5 Mly (6.28 Mpc)
- Apparent magnitude (V): 11.0

Characteristics
- Type: SA(s)0/a
- Apparent size (V): 5.2′ × 1.9′

Other designations
- NGC 3593, UGC 6272, PGC 34257

NGC 3593 is a lenticular galaxy located in the equatorial constellation of Leo. It has a morphological classification of SA(s)0/a, which indicates it is a lenticular galaxy of the pure spiral type. Despite this, it has a large amount of hydrogen, both in its molecular (H_{2}) and atomic (H) form. It is a starburst galaxy, which means it is forming new stars at a high rate. This is occurring in a band of gas surrounding the central nucleus. There is a single arm, which spirals outward from this ring. It is frequently but not consistently identified as a member of the Leo Triplet group.

This galaxy is known to contain two counter-rotating populations of stars—that is, one set of stars is rotating in the opposite direction with respect to the other. One means for this to occur is by acquiring gas from an external source, which then undergoes star formation. An alternative is by a merger with a second galaxy. Neither scenario has been ruled out. The age of the lower mass, counter-rotating population is younger by about 1.6 ± 0.8 Gyr than the primary star population of the galaxy.

A dynamical study found that there is likely a supermassive black hole (SMBH) at the center of NGC 3593. The mass of the SMBH is between 3.0×10^{5} and 4.3×10^{6} solar masses.

== See also ==
- Messier 65 – spiral galaxy in Leo Triplet
- Messier 66 – barred spiral galaxy in Leo Triplet
- NGC 3628 – spiral galaxy in Leo Triplet
