= NGC 818 =

Galaxy in the constellation Andromeda

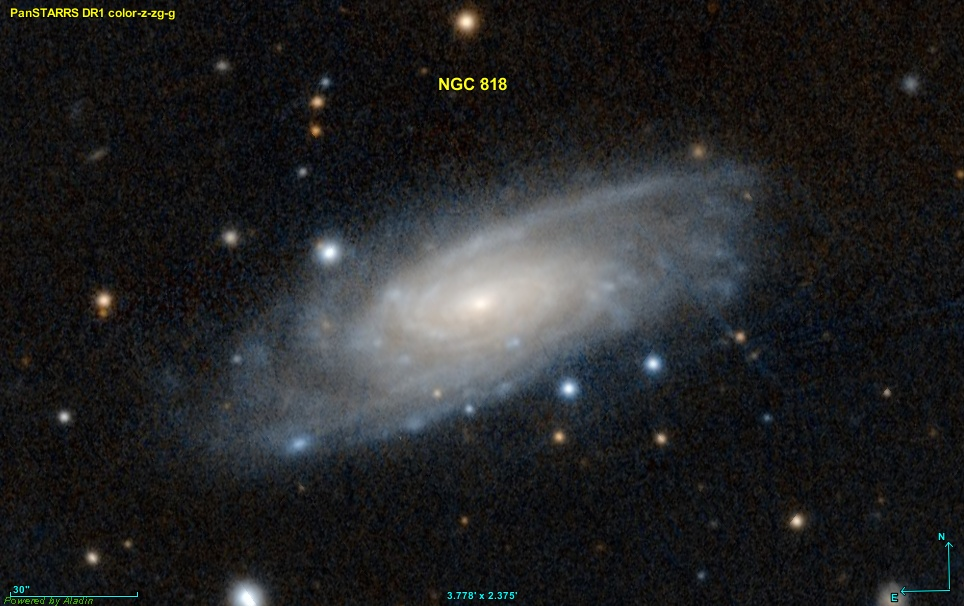
- NGC 818 imaged by Pan-STARRS

Observation data (J2000 epoch)
- Constellation: Andromeda
- Right ascension: 02^{h} 08^{m} 44.5464^{s}
- Declination: +38° 46′ 37.596″
- Redshift: 0.014156±0.0000130
- Heliocentric radial velocity: 4,244±4 km/s
- Distance: 168.62 ± 8.37 Mly (51.700 ± 2.565 Mpc)
- Group or cluster: [CHM2007] LDC 148
- Apparent magnitude (V): 13.20

Characteristics
- Type: SABc
- Size: ~171,700 ly (52.64 kpc) (estimated)
- Apparent size (V): 3.0′ × 1.3′

Other designations
- IRAS 02057+3832, 2MASX J02084451+3846381, UGC 1633, MCG +06-05-086, PGC 8185, CGCG 522-116

NGC 818 is an intermediate spiral galaxy in the constellation of Andromeda. Its velocity with respect to the cosmic microwave background is 4,010±17 km/s, which corresponds to a Hubble distance of 192.9 ± 13.5 Mly (59.14 ± 4.15 Mpc). Additionally, 14 non-redshift measurements give a closer mean distance of 168.62 ± 8.37 Mly (51.700 ± 2.565 Mpc). It was discovered by German-British astronomer William Herschel on 18 October 1786.

NGC 818 has a possible active galactic nucleus, i.e. it has a compact region at the center of a galaxy that emits a significant amount of energy across the electromagnetic spectrum, with characteristics indicating that this luminosity is not produced by the stars.

== Galaxy group ==
NGC 818 is a member of a galaxy group known as [CHM2007] LDC 148. The other galaxies in the group are NGC 834, NGC 841, NGC 845, UGC 1673, and UGC 1721.

== Supermassive black hole ==
According to a paper based on measurements of the near-infrared K-band luminosity of the galaxy's bulge, NGC 818 has a supermassive black hole with a mass of 1×10^{7.1}M_{☉} (13 million solar masses).

== Supernova ==
One supernova has been observed in NGC 818:

- SN 1992az (Type II, mag. 18) was discovered by Christian Pollas on 27 September 1992.

== See also ==
- List of NGC objects (1–1000)
