= NGC 2959 =

Galaxy in the constellation Ursa Major

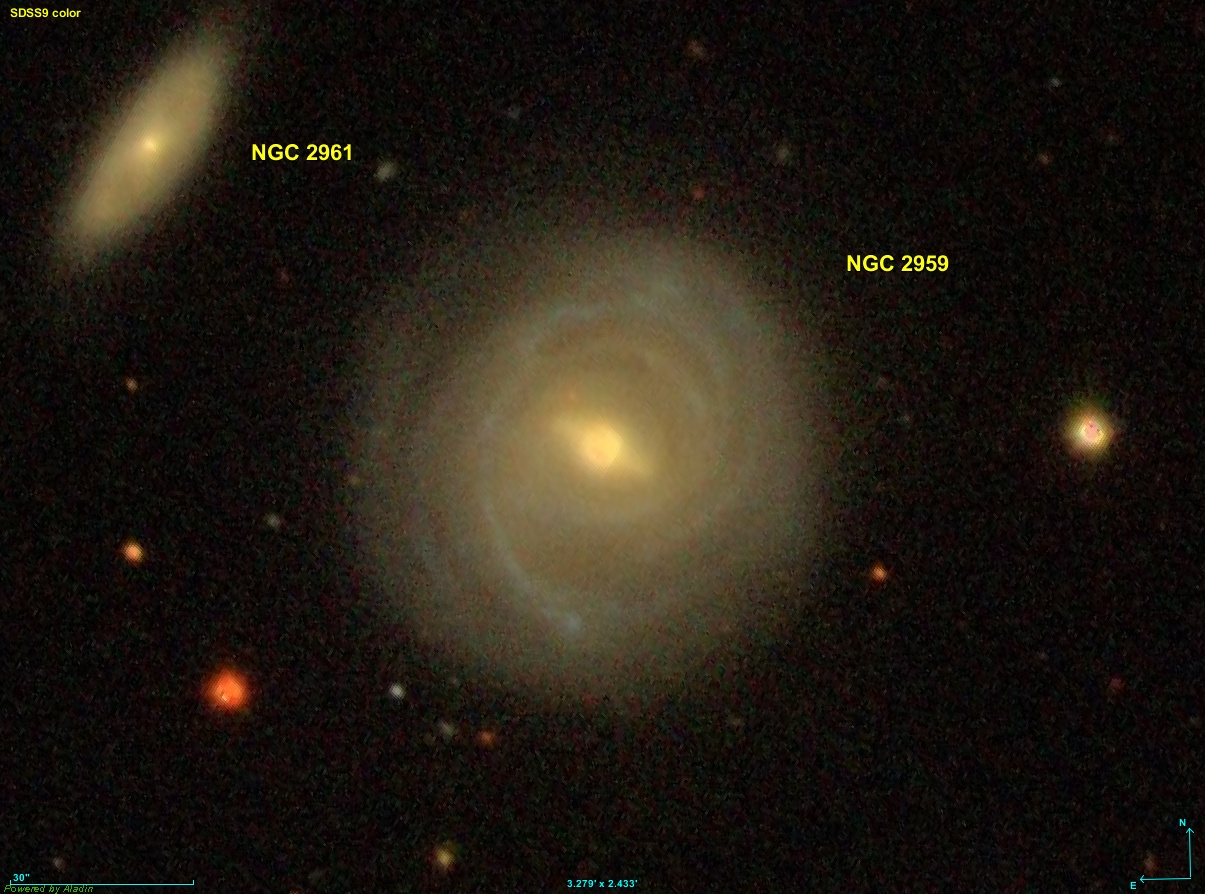
- NGC 2959 imaged by SDSS

Observation data (J2000 epoch)
- Constellation: Ursa Major
- Right ascension: 09^{h} 45^{m} 08.9714^{s}
- Declination: +68° 35′ 40.507″
- Redshift: 0.014817
- Heliocentric radial velocity: 4442 ± 3 km/s
- Distance: 217.7 ± 15.2 Mly (66.74 ± 4.67 Mpc)
- Apparent magnitude (V): 12.8

Characteristics
- Type: (R')SAB(rs)ab pec?
- Size: ~131,400 ly (40.28 kpc) (estimated)
- Apparent size (V): 1.4′ × 1.4′

Other designations
- IRAS 09409+6849, UGC 5202, MCG +12-09-062, PGC 27939, CGCG 332-061

NGC 2959 is an intermediate spiral galaxy in the constellation Ursa Major. Its velocity relative to the cosmic microwave background is 4,525 ± 6 km/s, which corresponds to a Hubble distance of 66.7 ± 4.7 Mpc (~218 million light years.). NGC 2959 was discovered by British astronomer John Herschel on 28 October 1831.

NGC 2959 has a luminosity class of I-II and a broad H I line.

According to the Simbad database, NGC 2959 is a LINER galaxy, i.e. a galaxy whose nucleus has an emission spectrum characterized by broad lines of weakly ionized atoms.

== Supernovae ==
Two supernovae have been observed in NGC 2959:

- SN 2021bbm (Type II, mag. 17.412) was discovered by ATLAS on 24 January 2021.
- SN 2023vog (Type II, mag. 18.5768) was discovered by the Automatic Learning for the Rapid Classification of Events (ALeRCE) on 21 October 2023.

== See also ==
- List of NGC objects (2001–3000)
