= NGC 2848 =

Galaxy in the constellation Hydra)

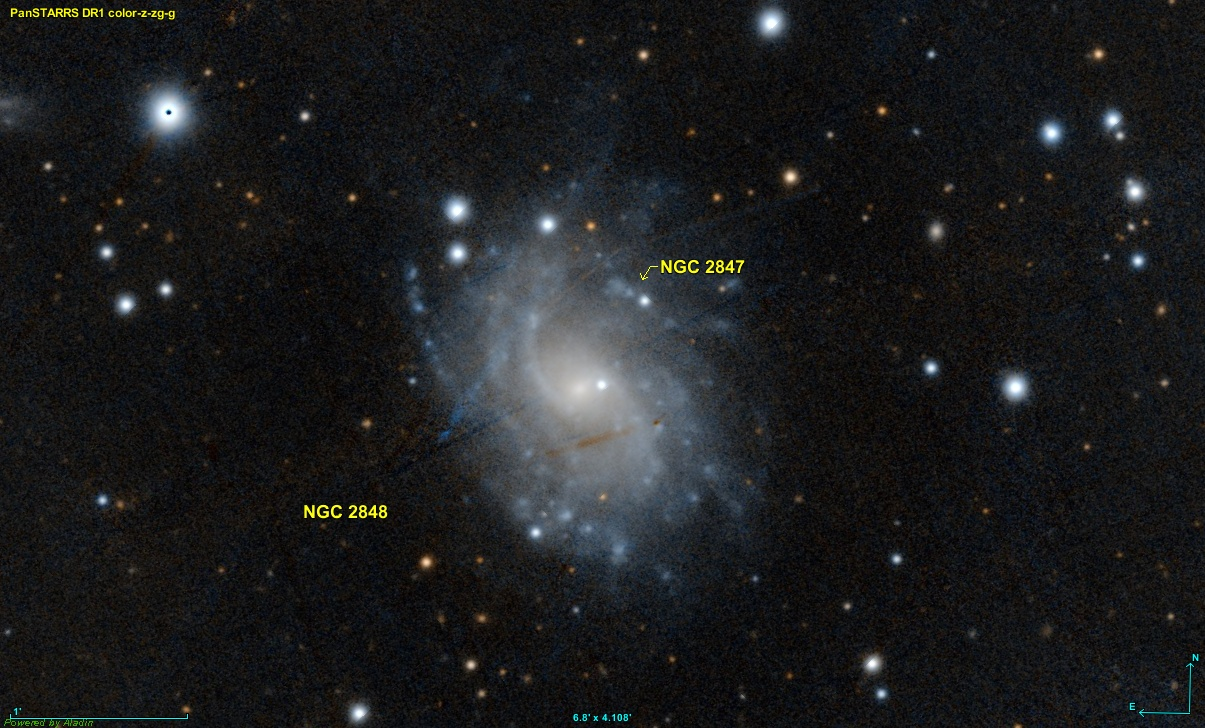
- NGC 2848 imaged by Pan-STARRS

Observation data (J2000 epoch)
- Constellation: Hydra
- Right ascension: 09^{h} 20^{m} 09.8143^{s}
- Declination: −16° 31′ 33.012″
- Redshift: 0.006791
- Heliocentric radial velocity: 2036 ± 4 km/s
- Distance: 61.62 ± 5.77 Mly (18.892 ± 1.769 Mpc)
- Apparent magnitude (V): 11.8

Characteristics
- Type: SAB(s)c?
- Size: ~52,600 ly (16.13 kpc) (estimated)
- Apparent size (V): 2.5′ × 1.5′

Other designations
- HOLM 128A, IRAS 09178-1618, 2MASX J09200989-1631334, UGCA 160, MCG -03-24-007, PGC 26404

NGC 2848 is an intermediate spiral galaxy in the constellation of Hydra. Its velocity with respect to the cosmic microwave background is 2,361 ± 23 km/s, which corresponds to a Hubble distance of 34.82 ± 2.46 Mpc (~114 million light-years). It was discovered by German-British astronomer William Herschel on 31 December 1785.

To date, 13 non-redshift measurements give a distance of 18.892 ± 6.377 Mpc (~61.6 million light-years), which is outside the Hubble distance values. Since this galaxy is relatively close to the Local Group, it is likely that this value is closer to the true distance of NGC 2848. It is with the average value of independent measurements, when they exist, that the NASA/IPAC database calculates the diameter of a galaxy.

== Supernovae ==
Two supernovae have been observed in NGC 2848:

- SN 1994L (Type II, mag. 14.7) was discovered by Nicholas Brown on 8 April 1994.
- SN 2023usp (Type II, mag. 18.262) was discovered by ATLAS on 12 October 2023.

== See also ==
- List of NGC objects (2001–3000)
