= NGC 5529 =

Spiral galaxy in the constellation Boötes

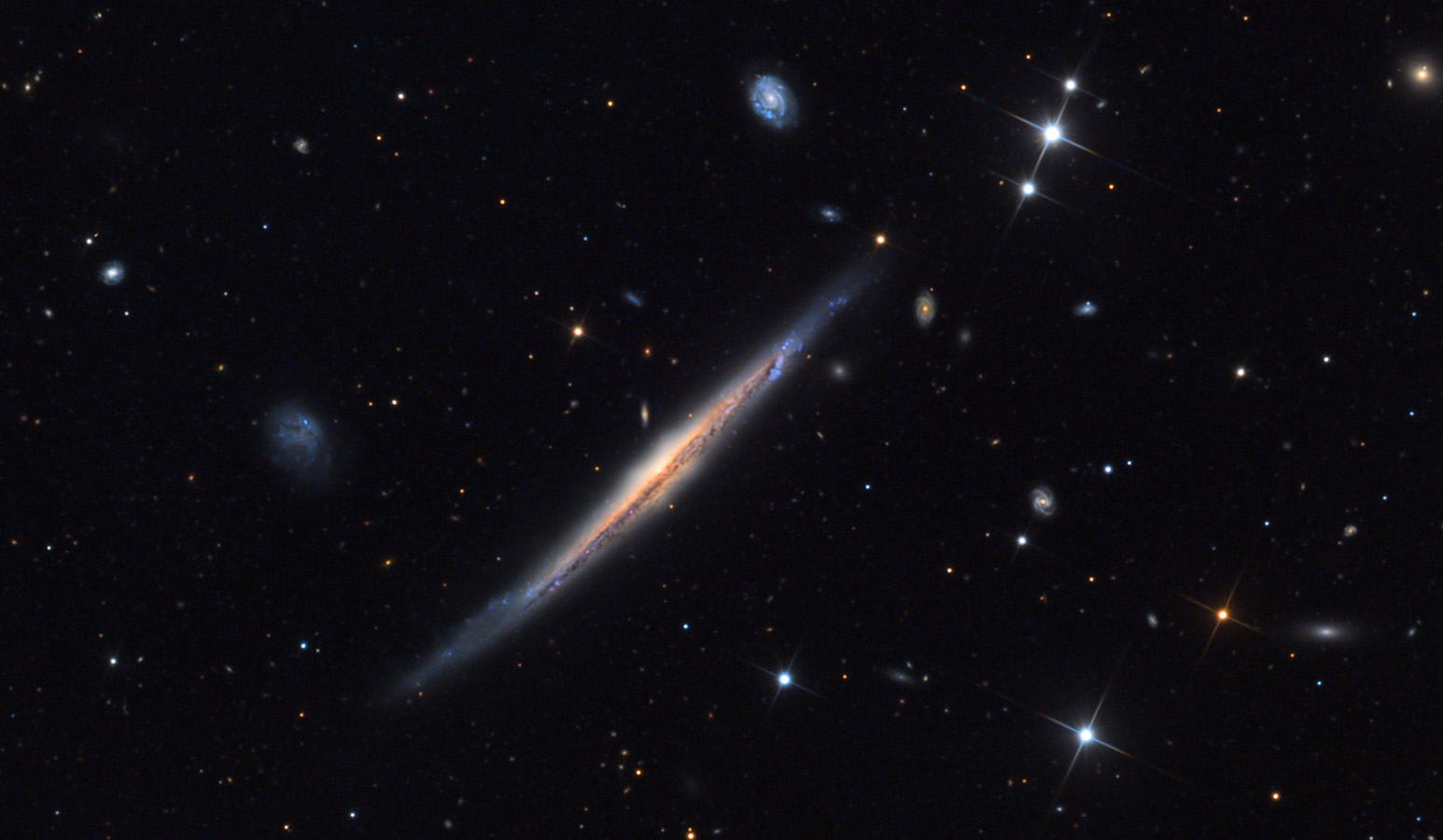
- NGC 5529 (center) as taken from Mount Lemmon SkyCenter

Observation data (J2000 epoch)
- Constellation: Boötes
- Right ascension: 14^{h} 15^{m} 34^{s}
- Declination: +36° 13′ 36″
- Redshift: 0.00986
- Heliocentric radial velocity: 2942 km/s
- Distance: 144 ± 23 Mly (44 ± 7 Mpc)
- Apparent magnitude (V): 12.8

Characteristics
- Type: SABbc
- Size: 252,500 ly (77.42 kpc) (estimated)
- Apparent size (V): 6.2 x 0.8

Other designations
- NGC 5529, UGC 9127, MCG +06-31-085, PGC 50942

NGC 5529 is an edge-on intermediate spiral galaxy in the constellation Boötes. It is located approximately 144 million light-years (44 megaparsecs) away and was discovered by William Herschel on May 1, 1785.

NGC 5529 is an edge-on intermediate galaxy. It is located near dwarf galaxies PGC 50952, and PGC 50925.

Polycyclic aromatic hydrocarbons (PAHs) have been detected in the mid-infrared spectrum of NGC 5529. PAHs have been shown to only appear in galaxies with recent star formation.
