= Supernova impostor =

Stellar explosions that appear to be supernovae

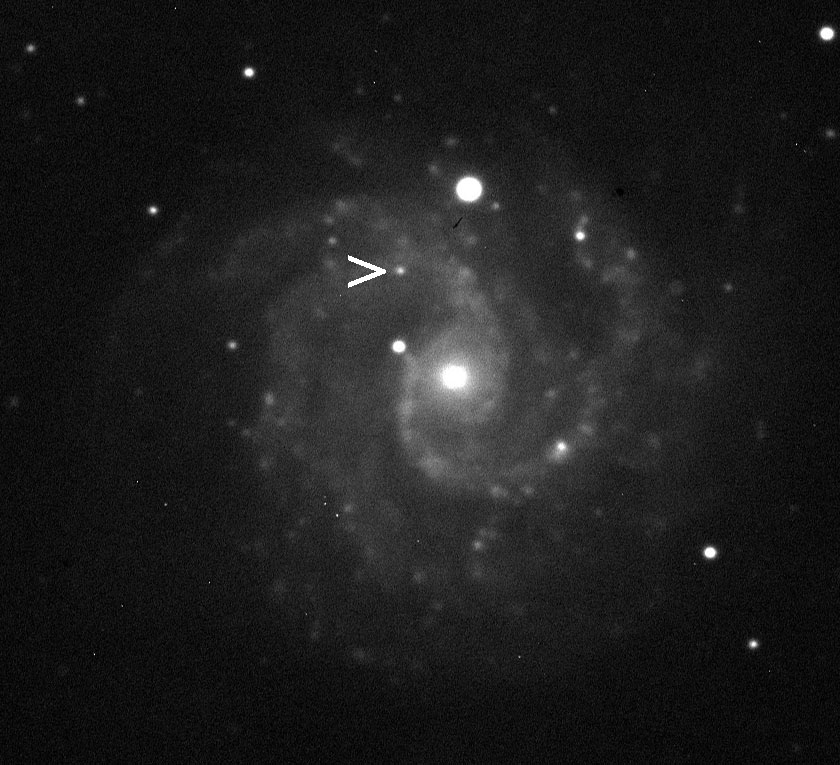
NGC 3184 showing SN impostor SN 2010dn.

Supernova impostors are stellar explosions that appear at first to be a supernova but do not destroy their progenitor stars. As such, they are a class of extra-powerful novae. They are also known as Type V supernovae, Eta Carinae analogs, and giant eruptions of luminous blue variables (LBV).

== Appearance, origin and mass loss ==
Supernova impostors appear as remarkably faint supernovae of spectral type IIn—which have hydrogen in their spectrum and narrow spectral lines that indicate relatively low gas speeds. These impostors exceed their pre-outburst states by several magnitudes, with typical peak absolute visual magnitudes of −11 to −14, making these outbursts as bright as the most luminous stars. The trigger mechanism of these outbursts remains unexplained, though it is thought to be caused by violating the classical Eddington luminosity limit, initiating severe mass loss. If the ratio of radiated energy to kinetic energy is near unity, as in Eta Carinae, then we might expect an ejected mass of about 0.16 solar masses.

== Examples ==
Possible examples of supernova impostors include the Great Eruption of Eta Carinae, P Cygni, SN 1961V, SN 1954J, SN 1997bs, SN 2008S, and SN 2010dn where detections of the surviving progenitor stars are claimed.

One supernova impostor that made news after the fact was the one observed on October 20, 2004, in the galaxy UGC 4904 by Japanese amateur astronomer Kōichi Itagaki. This LBV star exploded just two years later, on October 11, 2006, as supernova SN 2006jc.

== See also ==
- Failed supernova
