= NGC 5674 =

Galaxy in the constellation Virgo

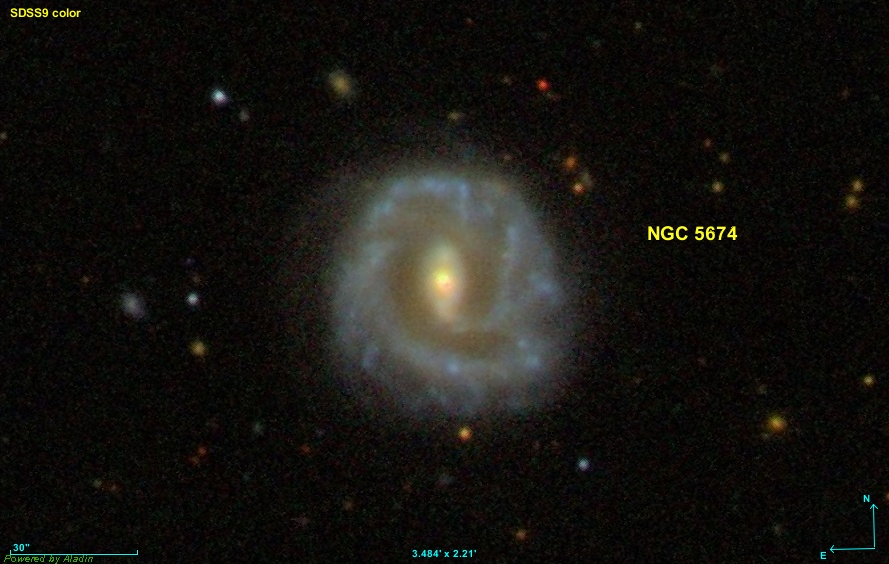
- NGC 5674 imaged by SDSS

Observation data (J2000 epoch)
- Constellation: Virgo
- Right ascension: 14^{h} 33^{m} 52.2782^{s}
- Declination: +05° 27′ 30.121″
- Redshift: 0.024931±0.0000300
- Heliocentric radial velocity: 7,474±9 km/s
- Distance: 240.70 ± 4.90 Mly (73.800 ± 1.501 Mpc)
- Apparent magnitude (V): 13.70

Characteristics
- Type: SABc
- Size: ~134,000 ly (41.07 kpc) (estimated)
- Apparent size (V): 1.1′ × 1.0′

Other designations
- IRAS 14313+0540, 2MASX J14335228+0527298, UGC 9369, MCG +01-37-031, PGC 52042, CGCG 047-096

NGC 5674 is an intermediate spiral galaxy in the constellation of Virgo. Its velocity with respect to the cosmic microwave background is 7,703±18 km/s, which corresponds to a Hubble distance of 370.6 ± 26.0 Mly (113.62 ± 7.96 Mpc). However, three non-redshift measurements give a much closer mean distance of 240.70 ± 4.90 Mly (73.800 ± 1.501 Mpc). It was discovered by German-British astronomer William Herschel on 12 May 1793.

NGC 5674 is a Seyfert II galaxy, i.e. it has a quasar-like nucleus with very high surface brightnesses whose spectra reveal strong, high-ionisation emission lines, but unlike quasars, the host galaxy is clearly detectable.

According to Abraham Mahtessian, NGC 5674 and NGC 5652 form a pair of galaxies.

== Supernova ==
One supernova has been observed in NGC 5674:

- SN 2025ajnc (Type Ia, mag. 19.4685) was discovered by the Zwicky Transient Facility on 28 December 2025.

== Image gallery ==
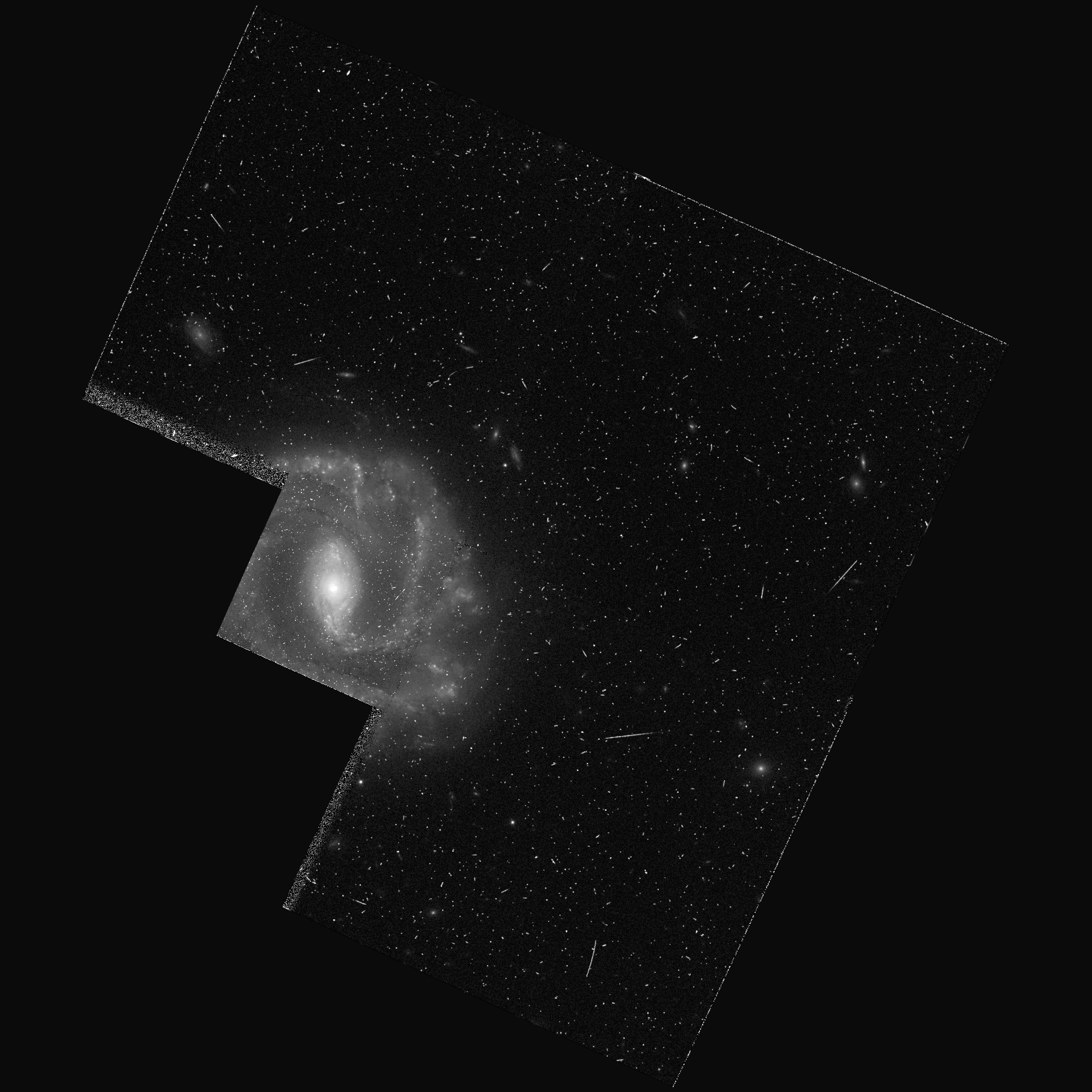
NGC 5674 imaged by the Hubble Space Telescope

== See also ==
- List of NGC objects (5001–6000)
