= NGC 1168 =

Spiral galaxy in the constellation Aries

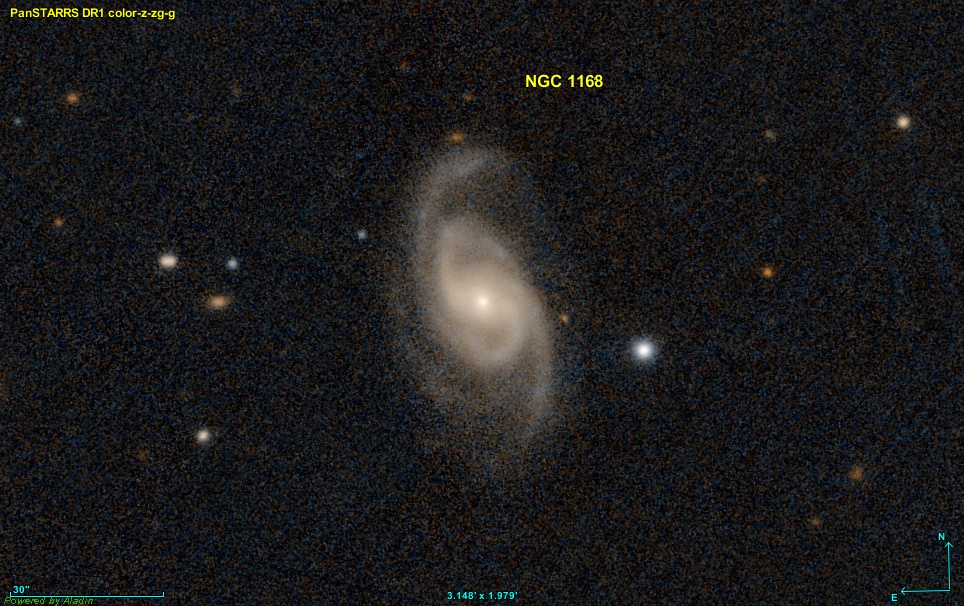
- NGC 1168 in the constellation Aries

Observation data (J2000 epoch)
- Constellation: Aries
- Redshift: 0.025778
- Heliocentric radial velocity: 7,728 km/s
- Apparent magnitude (B): 15.4

Characteristics
- Type: SABb (Intermediate Spiral Galaxy)
- Apparent size (V): 0.98 × 0.38 arcmin

Other designations
- UGC 2476, PGC 11378, MCG 02-08-047, KCPG 85B

NGC 1168 is an intermediate spiral galaxy located in the constellation Aries. It was discovered by the astronomer Albert Marth on October 1, 1864.

== Characteristics ==
NGC 1168 is classified as an SABb, indicating it has features between barred and unbarred spiral galaxies. It has an apparent magnitude of 15.4 in the B-band, making it relatively faint and requiring a telescope with at least a 20-inch (500 mm) aperture for observation. The galaxy spans approximately 0.98 × 0.38 arcminutes in the sky.

== Observation ==
Due to its faintness, NGC 1168 is not visible to the naked eye and requires specialized equipment for observation. It is receding from the Milky Way at a velocity of about 7,728 km/s.

== See also ==
- List of NGC objects
- Intermediate spiral galaxy
- Aries (constellation)
