= NGC 4653 =

Galaxy in the constellation Virgo

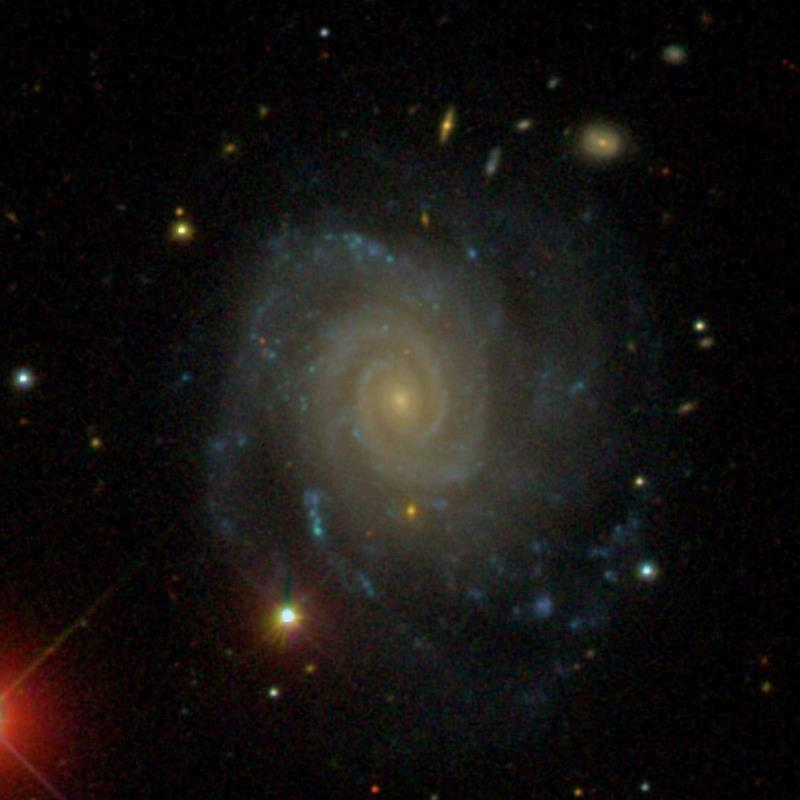
- NGC 4653 imaged by SDSS

Observation data (J2000 epoch)
- Constellation: Virgo
- Right ascension: 12^{h} 43^{m} 50.9247^{s}
- Declination: −00° 33′ 40.241″
- Redshift: 0.008742±0.000013
- Heliocentric radial velocity: 2,621±4 km/s
- Distance: 131.11 ± 3.59 Mly (40.200 ± 1.100 Mpc)
- Group or cluster: NGC 4642 Group (LDC 913)
- Apparent magnitude (V): 13.4

Characteristics
- Type: SAB(rs)cd
- Size: ~117,800 ly (36.13 kpc) (estimated)
- Apparent size (V): 1.77′ × 1.38′

Other designations
- IRAS 12412-0017, UGC 7900, MCG +00-33-006, PGC 42847, CGCG 015-009

NGC 4653 is an intermediate spiral galaxy in the constellation of Virgo. Its velocity with respect to the cosmic microwave background is 2,960±24 km/s, which corresponds to a Hubble distance of 142.4 ± 10.0 Mly (43.66 ± 3.08 Mpc). However, two non-redshift measurements give a closer distance of 131.11 ± 3.59 Mly (40.200 ± 1.100 Mpc). It was discovered by German-British astronomer William Herschel on 11 April 1787.

== NGC 4642 Group ==
NGC 4653 is a member of the NGC 4642 Group (also known as LDC 913). This trio of galaxies includes NGC 4642 and NGC 4690. A study published in 2022 claims that NGC 4653 and NGC 4642 form a physical pair, separated by about 50 kpc, and that there is a high probability of a merger in the near future.

== Supernovae ==
Three supernovae have been observed in NGC 4653:

- SN 1999gk (Type II, mag. 15.7) was discovered by Perry Berlind on 15 December 1999.
- SN 2009ik (Type Ia, mag. 15.3) was discovered by Berto Monard on 22 August 2009.
- SN 2025mqc (Type Ib, mag. 18.78) was discovered by ATLAS on 31 May 2025.

== See also ==
- List of NGC objects (4001-5000)
