= NGC 5235 =

Galaxy in the constellation Virgo

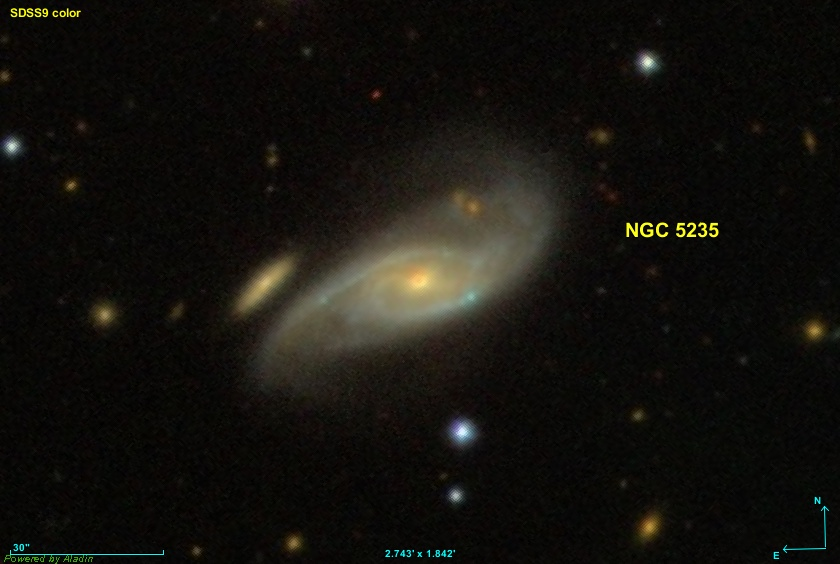
- NGC 5235 imaged by SDSS

Observation data (J2000 epoch)
- Constellation: Virgo
- Right ascension: 13^{h} 36^{m} 01.4062^{s}
- Declination: +06° 35′ 07.342″
- Redshift: 0.021949
- Heliocentric radial velocity: 6580 ± 10 km/s
- Distance: 330.5 ± 23.2 Mly (101.34 ± 7.10 Mpc)
- Apparent magnitude (V): 14.2

Characteristics
- Type: SB
- Size: ~109,100 ly (33.45 kpc) (estimated)
- Apparent size (V): 1.2′ × 0.5′

Other designations
- IRAS 13335+0650, 2MASX J13360139+0635076, UGC 8582, MCG +01-35-012, PGC 47984, CGCG 045-036

NGC 5235 is an intermediate spiral galaxy in the constellation of Virgo. Its velocity with respect to the cosmic microwave background is 6871 ± 23 km/s, which corresponds to a Hubble distance of 101.34 ± 7.10 Mpc (~330 million light-years). It was discovered by German-British astronomer William Herschel on 13 April 1784.

In the same area of the sky are the galaxies NGC 5210, NGC 5224, and NGC 5239, among others.

== Supernova ==
One supernova has been observed in NGC 5235: SN 2024grb (Type Ia, mag. 18.333) was discovered by ATLAS on 16 April 2024.

== See also ==
- List of NGC objects (5001–6000)
