= Sarah Williams (poet) =

English poet

- Born: December 1837; Marylebone, London, UK
- Died: 25 April 1868 (aged 30); Kentish Town, London, UK
- Education: Queen's College, London
- Occupation: Poet
- Writing career
- Pen name: Sadie, S.A.D.I.
- Language: English
- Years active: 1866–68
- Period: Victorian
- Notable work: "The Old Astronomer"

Sarah Williams (December 1837 (Note: Contemporary birth records and publications at Williams' death indicate that she was born in December 1837. Later sources and modern databases give the date incorrectly as 1841, based on The Poets and the Poetry of the Nineteenth Century (published in 1898).) – 25 April 1868) was an English poet and novelist, most famous as the author of the poem "The Old Astronomer". She published short works and one collection of poetry during her lifetime under the pseudonyms Sadie and S.A.D.I., the former of which she considered her name rather than a nom de plume. Her posthumously published second poetry collection and novel appeared under her given name.

== Biography ==
Williams was born in December 1837 in Marylebone, London, to Welsh father Robert Williams (c. 1807–1868) and English mother Louisa Ware (c. 1811–1886). She was very close to her father and considered her "bardic" interests to come from him. As a young child unable to pronounce 'Sarah', she inadvertently gave herself the nickname 'Sadie'. An only child, she was educated first by her doting parents and later governesses. She attended Queen's College, London.

Although Williams was only half Welsh by birth and never lived outside London, she incorporated Welsh phrases and themes in her poems and Sadie was considered a Welsh poet.

Robert Williams died in January 1868 of a sudden illness. Already suffering from cancer and devastated by the loss of her father, Sarah's condition deteriorated. After three additional months of hiding the cancer from her friend and mother, she agreed to surgery despite knowing it might kill her. She died in Kentish Town, London during surgery on 25 April 1868.

Her second book of poetry, Twilight Hours: A Legacy of Verse, was published in late 1868. The collection included "The Old Astronomer" (also known as "The Old Astronomer to His Pupil", as it was titled in a 1936 U.S. reprint), now the most famous of her poems. The second half of the fourth stanza is the best known:

Though my soul may set in darkness, it will rise in perfect light;
I have loved the stars too truly (Note: Some republications, including the 1936 version, replace "truly" with "fondly".) to be fearful of the night.

The poem is written from the perspective of an aged astronomer on his deathbed bidding his student to continue his humble research. The lines have been chosen by a number of professional and amateur astronomers as their epitaphs.

== Legacy ==
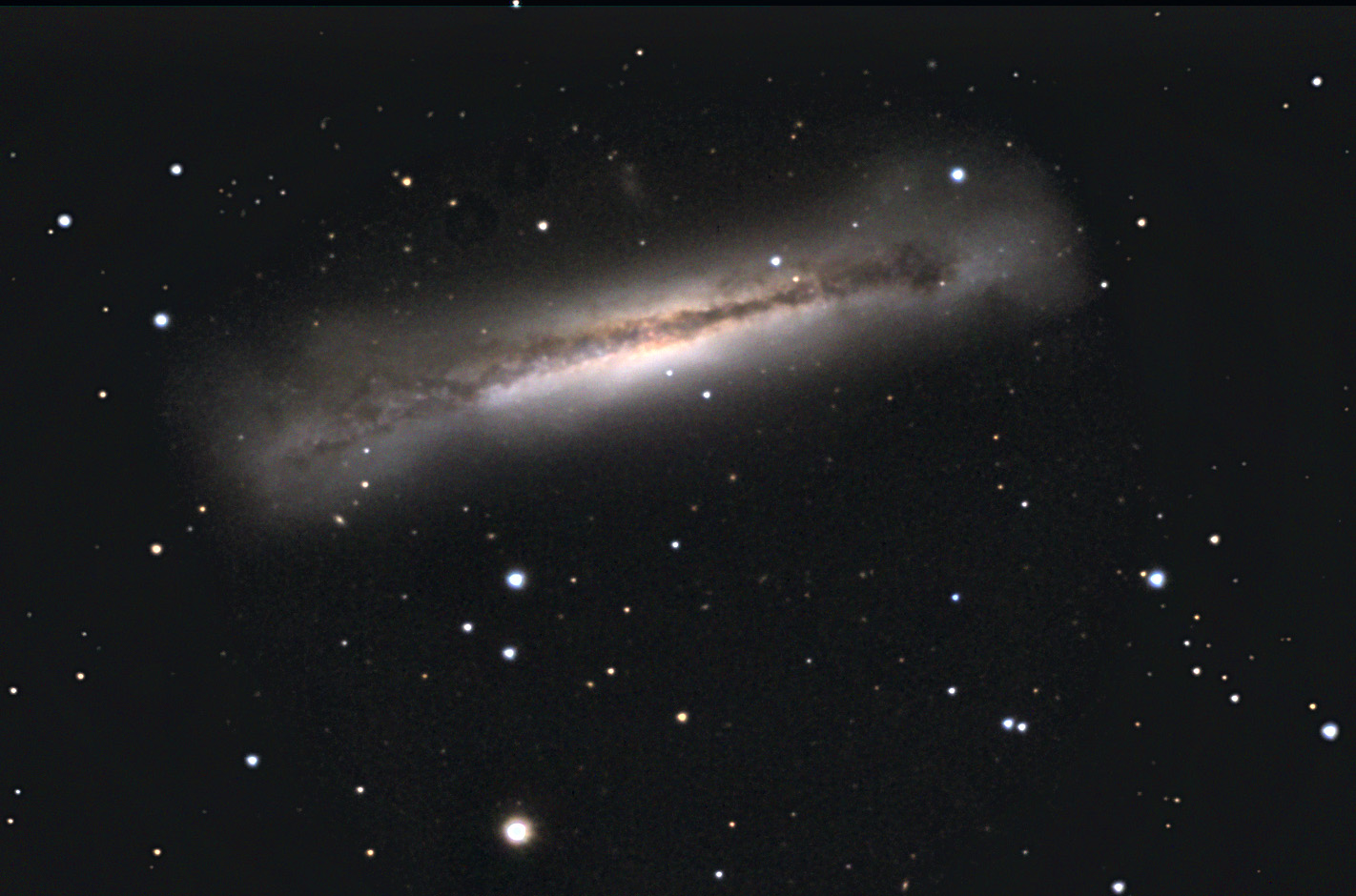
NGC 3628 ("Sarah's Galaxy")

Ian Rankin titled his Inspector Rebus novel Set in Darkness after The Old Astronomer and quoted the lines in the introduction. In an interview, Rankin linked the quote to the rise of a restored Scottish Parliament and the redemption of the Inspector in the novel.

The galaxy NGC 3628 is nicknamed "Sarah's Galaxy" in tribute to Williams.

In Star Trek: Discovery, a starship's dedication plaque quotes from "The Old Astronomer".
