= UGC 4904 =

Galaxy in the constellation Lynx

- UGC 4904, imaged by the Sloan Digital Sky Survey

Observation data (J2000 epoch)
- Constellation: Lynx
- Right ascension: 09^{h} 17^{m} 22.062^{s}
- Declination: +41° 54′ 39.70″
- Redshift: 0.005571
- Heliocentric radial velocity: 1665
- Distance: 90.5 ± 6.4 Mly (27.74 ± 1.96 Mpc)
- Apparent magnitude (B): 15.0

Characteristics
- Type: SABdm
- Size: ~31,200 ly (9.58 kpc) (estimated)
- Notable features: Dwarf spiral galaxy with a supernova impostor which eventually exploded as an actual supernova

Other designations
- MCG +07-19-054, PGC 26231, CGCG 209-044

UGC 4904 is a barred spiral galaxy in the constellation Lynx. Its velocity with respect to the cosmic microwave background is 1880 ± 15 km/s, which corresponds to a Hubble distance of 90.5 ± 6.4 Mly (27.74 ± 1.96 Mpc). The first known reference to this galaxy comes from Part 2 of the Morphological Catalogue of Galaxies, published in 1964, where it is listed as MCG +07-19-054.

== Supernova ==
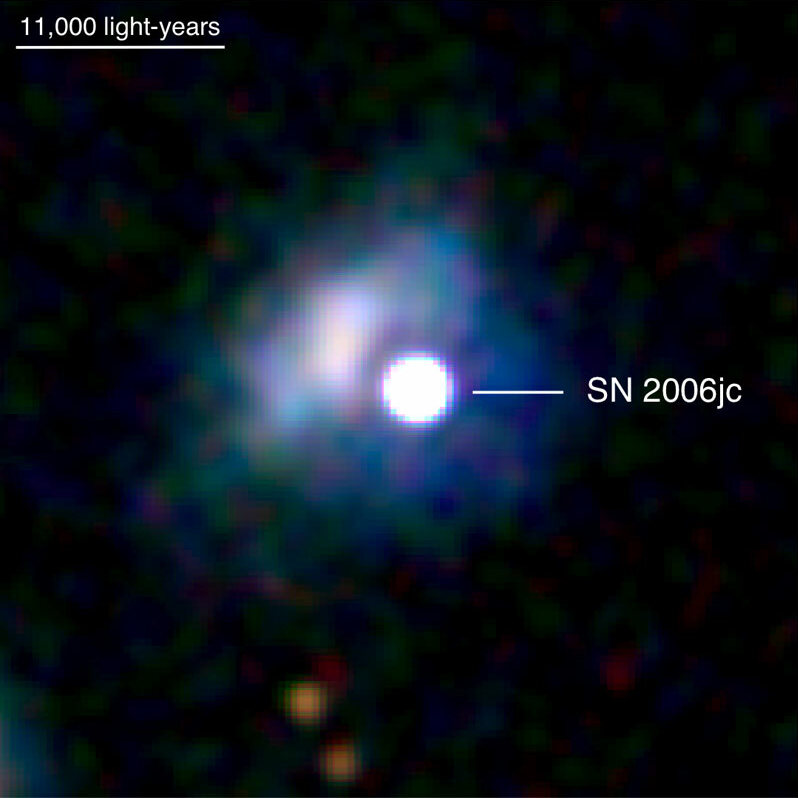
Swift Ultraviolet/Optical Telescope image of SN 2006jc

On October 20, 2004, a supernova impostor was observed by Japanese amateur astronomer Kōichi Itagaki within the galaxy. This same star may have transitioned from a luminous blue variable star to a Wolf–Rayet star shortly before it was observed as blowing up as supernova SN 2006jc (Type Ibn, mag. 13.8) on October 11, 2006.
