= Leo Triplet =

Group of galaxies in the constellation Leo

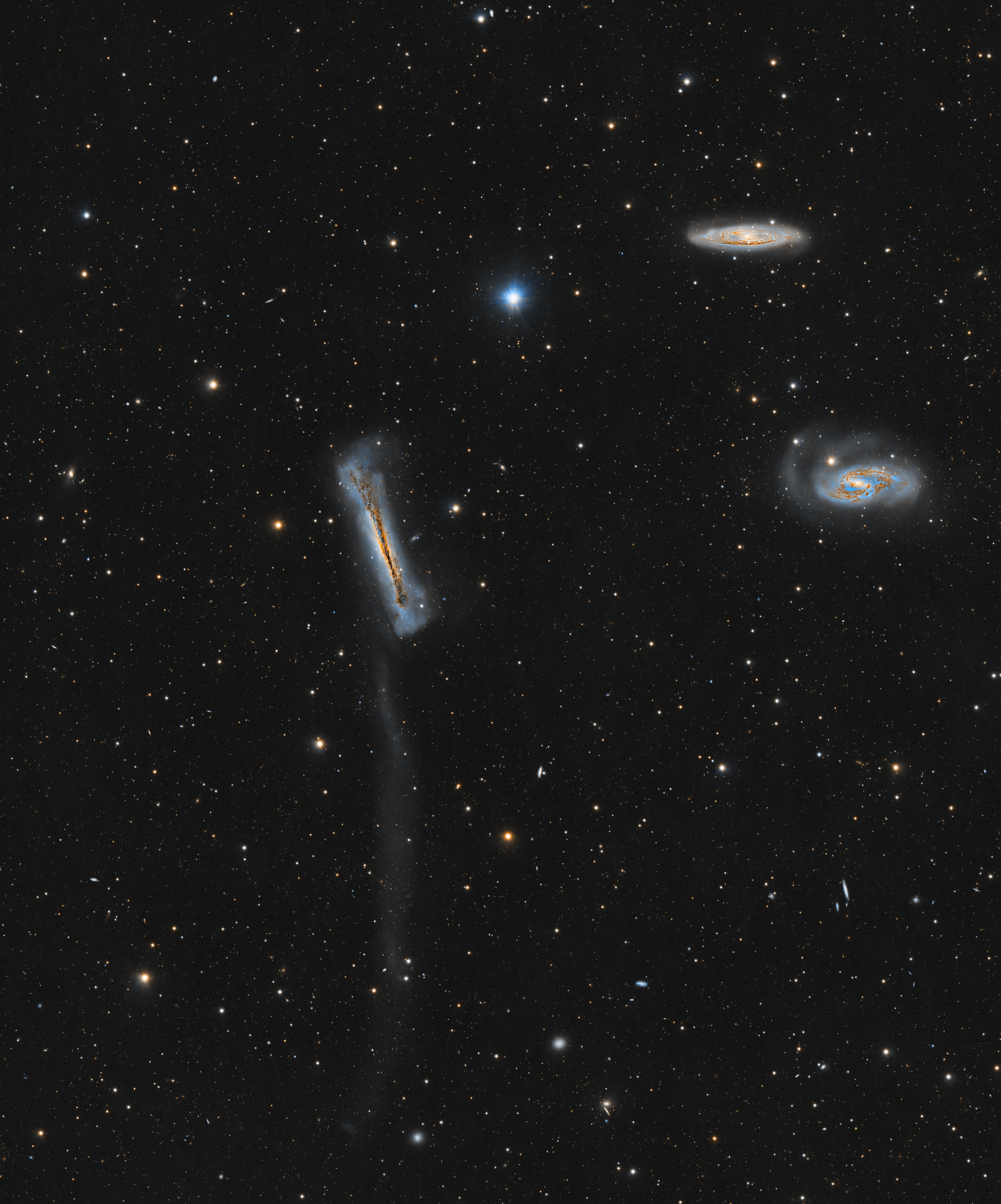
- The Leo Triplet, with M65 (right top), M66 (right bottom) and NGC 3628 (left). North is to the left.

Observation data (Epoch J2000)
- Constellation: Leo
- Right ascension: 11^{h} 17^{m}
- Declination: +13° 25′
- Brightest member: M66
- Number of galaxies: 3-5

Other designations
- M66 Group, Arp 317, LGG 231, NOGG P1 533, NOGG P2 543

The Leo Triplet (also known as the M66 Group) is a small group of galaxies about 35 million light-years away in the constellation Leo. This galaxy group consists of the spiral galaxies M65, M66, and NGC 3628.

== Members ==
The table below lists galaxies that have been consistently identified as group members in the Nearby Galaxies Catalog, the Lyons Groups of Galaxies (LGG) Catalog, and the group lists created from the Nearby Optical Galaxy sample of Giuricin et al.

=== Member list ===
Members of the Leo Triplet
Name	Type	R.A. (J2000)	Dec. (J2000)	Redshift (km/s)	Apparent Magnitude
M65	SAB(rs)a	11^{h} 18^{m} 56.0^{s}	+13° 05′ 32″	807 ± 3	9.3
M66	SAB(s)b	11^{h} 20^{m} 15.0^{s}	+12° 59′ 30″	727 ± 3	8.9
NGC 3628	SAb pec	11^{h} 20^{m} 17.0^{s}	+13° 35′ 23″	843 ± 1	9.5

Additionally, some of the references cited above indicate that one or two other nearby galaxies may be group members. NGC 3593 is frequently but not consistently identified as a member of this group.

== Nearby groups ==
The M96 Group is located physically near the Leo Triplet. These two groups may actually be separate parts of a much larger group, and some group identification algorithms actually identify the Leo Triplet as part of the M96 Group.

== See also ==
- NGC 5866 Group – another small group of galaxies
