= SN 2006jc =

Supernova

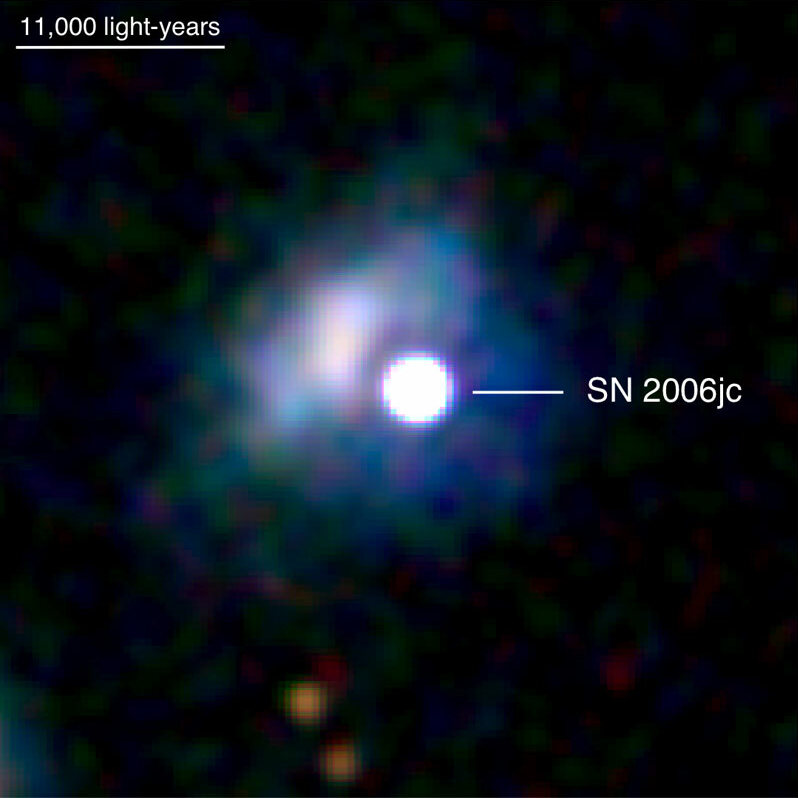
- Swift Ultraviolet/Optical Telescope image of Supernova 2006jc in the galaxy UGC 4904 in three filters. Credit: NASA/Swift/S. Immler
- Event type: Supernova
- Ibn
- Constellation: Lynx
- Right ascension: 9^{h} 17^{m} 20.81^{s}
- Declination: +41° 54′ 33″
- Epoch: J2000.0
- Host: UGC 4904
- Peak apparent magnitude: <13.8
- Other designations: SN 2006jc
- Related media on Commons

SN 2006jc was a Type Ibn supernova that was detected on October 9, 2006, in the galaxy UGC 4904, which is about 77 million light-years away in the constellation Lynx. It was first seen by Japanese amateur astronomer Kōichi Itagaki, American amateur Tim Puckett, and Italian amateur Roberto Gorelli. Two years earlier, on 20 October 2004, the progenitor star produced a supernova impostor that was detected by Itagaki. This outburst was apparently the progenitor star shedding its outer layers. When the star exploded in 2006, the shockwave hit the material blown off in 2004, heating it to millions of degrees and emitting copious amounts of X-rays.

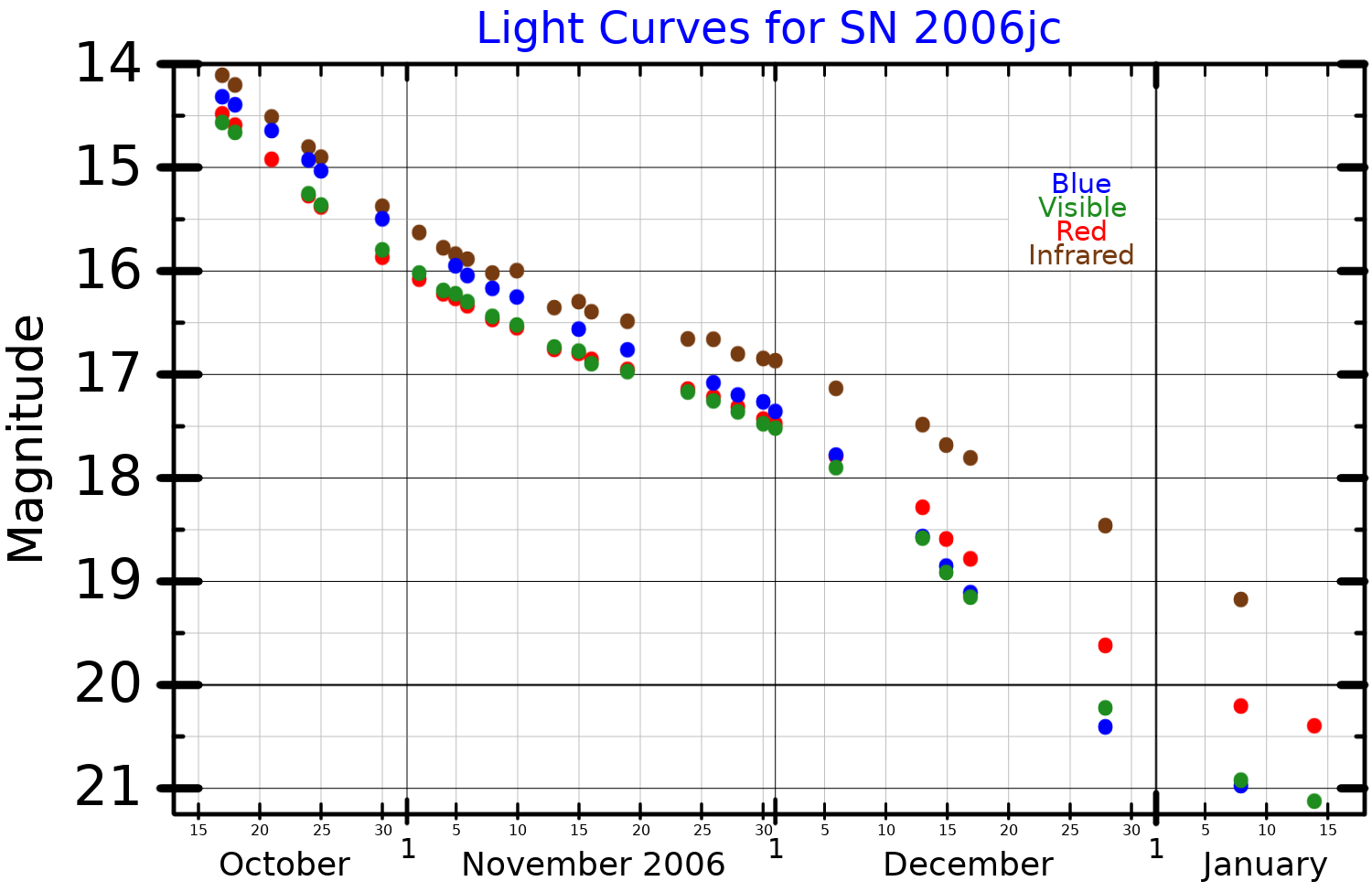
Light curves for SN 2006jc in four photometric bands, plotted from data published by Anupama et al. (2009)
