= NGC 834 =

Spiral galaxy in the constellation Andromeda

NGC 801
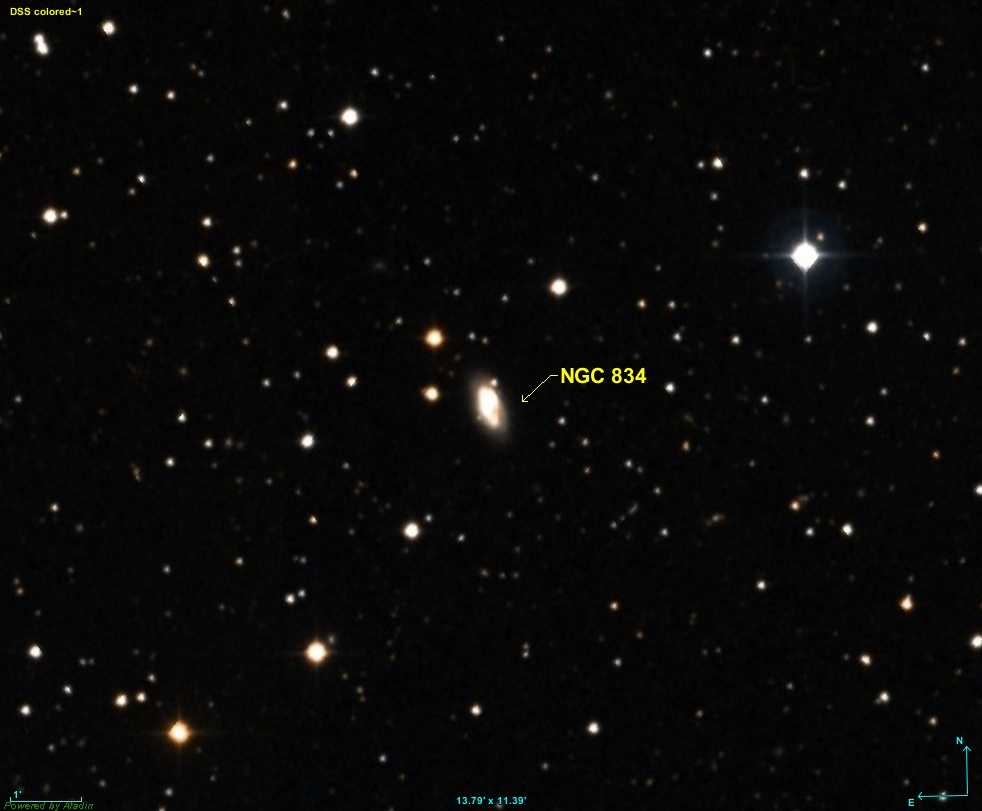
- NGC 834

Observation data (J2000 epoch)
- Constellation: Andromeda
- Right ascension: 02^{h} 11^{m} 01.277^{s}
- Declination: +37° 39′ 59.00″
- Heliocentric radial velocity: 4,600
- Distance: 159.8 Mly (48.98 Mpc)
- Apparent magnitude (B): 13.2

Characteristics
- Type: S?
- Apparent size (V): 0.810′ × 0.454′

Other designations
- UGC 1672, MCG +06-05-099, PGC 8352

NGC 834 is a spiral galaxy located in the constellation Andromeda. It is estimated to be 160 million light-years away from the Milky Way galaxy and has a diameter of about 65,000 light-years. The object was discovered on September 21, 1786 by the astronomer William Herschel.

NGC 834 is a member of a galaxy group the known as LGG 51, which contains six galaxies, such as NGC 841, UGC 1721, UGC 1771, UGC 1650 and UGC 1673.
