= SN 1997bs =

Possible supernova from an Eta Carinae analog star

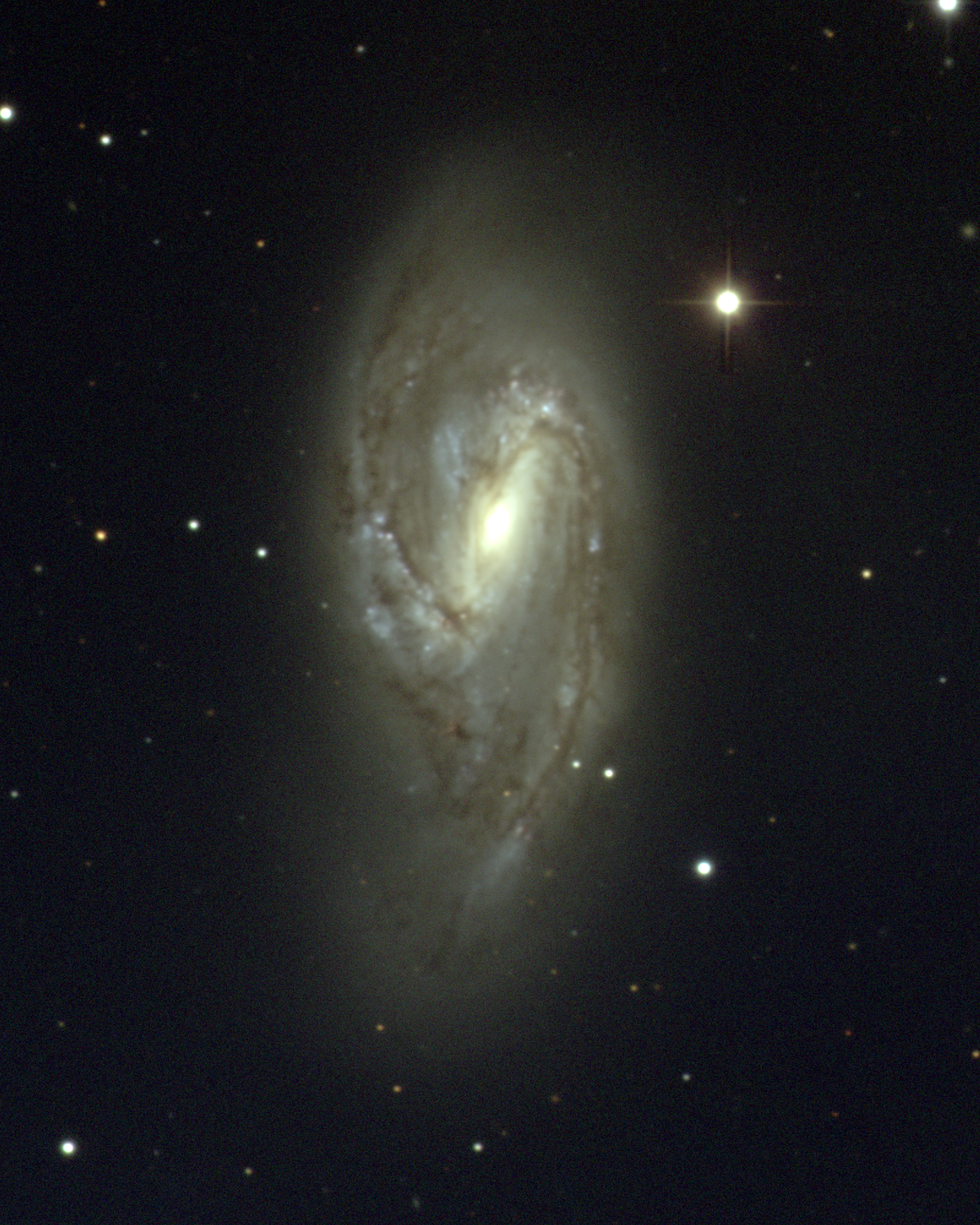
- Image of the host galaxy Messier 66
- Event type: Supernova
- subluminous type lln
- Instrument: LOSS
- Constellation: Leo
- Distance: 31 million ly
- Host: Messier 66
- Progenitor type: Luminous blue variable
- Notable features: Extragalactic Eta Carinae analog that may have survived the supernova
- Other designations: SN 1997bs

SN 1997bs was a subluminous type II supernova that occurred in the intermediate spiral galaxy Messier 66, about 31 million light years from Earth, in April of 1997. The progenitor star that produced this supernova was a massive luminous blue variable that was similar to the star Eta Carinae. This star was not associated with an H II region or any nearby massive stars. It is possible that the star that produced SN 1997bs survived the explosion and is hidden in a thick shell of dust with a mass of around 1 solar mass.

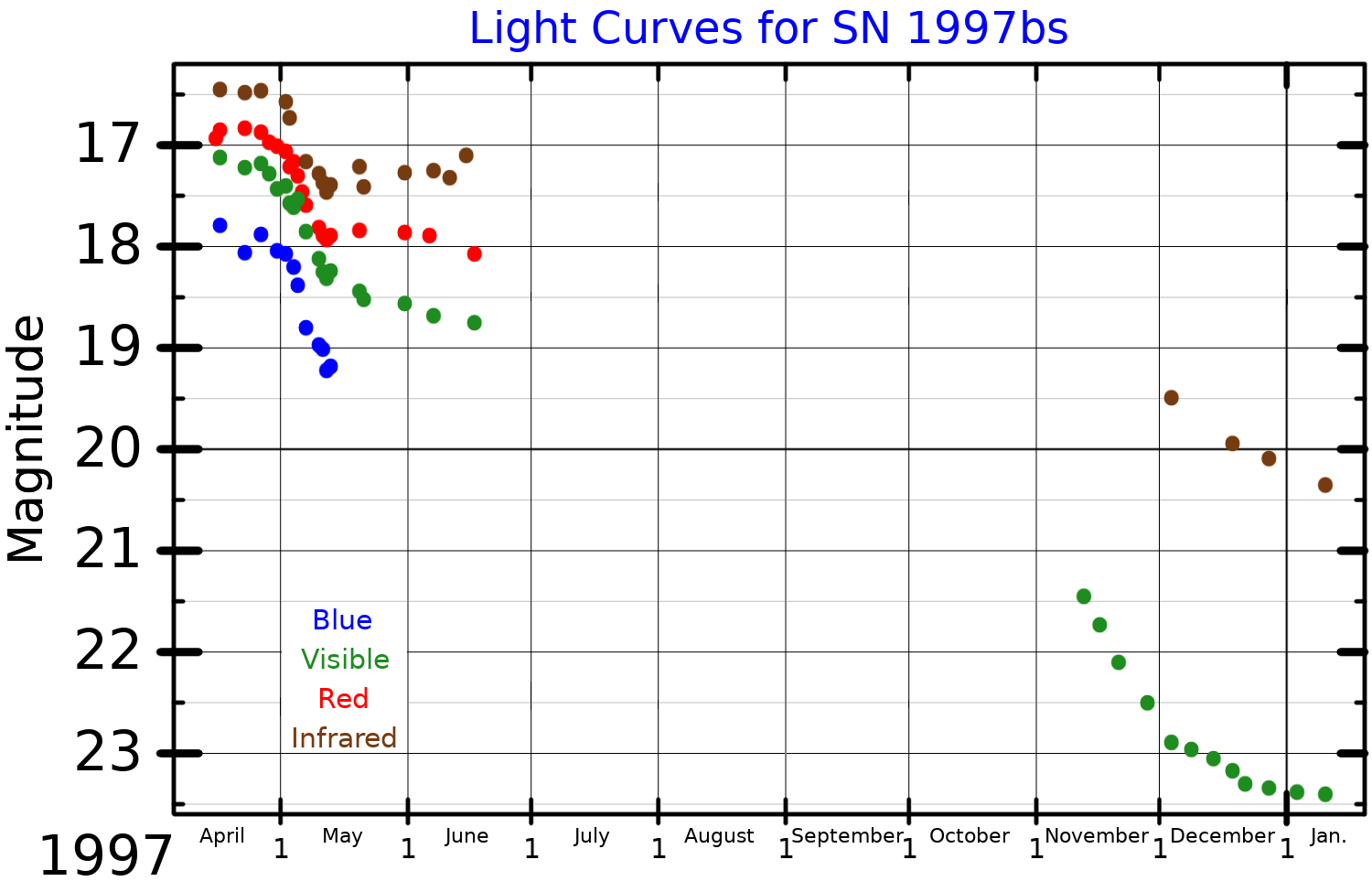
Light curves for SN 1997bs in four photometric bands, plotted from data published by Van Dyk et al. (2000)

SN 1997bs was the first supernova discovered by the Lick Observatory Supernova Search (LOSS).
