= NGC 3628 =

Spiral galaxy in the constellation Leo

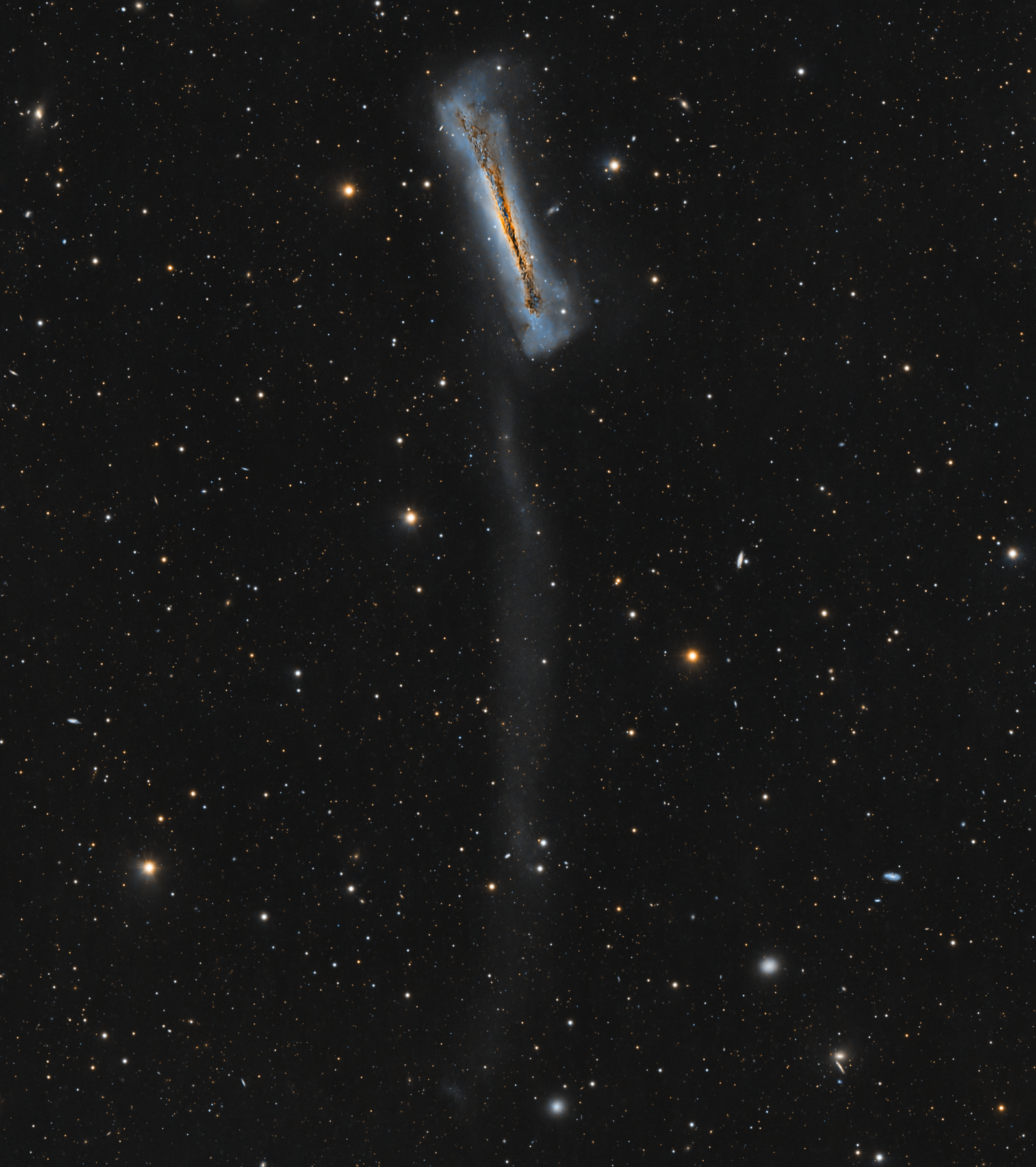
- NGC 3628 and its long tidal tail

Observation data (J2000 epoch)
- Constellation: Leo
- Right ascension: 11^{h} 20^{m} 17.0^{s}
- Declination: +13° 35′ 23″
- Redshift: 843±1 km/s
- Distance: 35 Mly (11 Mpc)
- Apparent magnitude (V): 9.5

Characteristics
- Type: SAb pec
- Size: ~150,000 ly (45.52 kpc) (estimated)
- Apparent size (V): 13.1′ × 3.6′
- Notable features: Galaxy in the Leo Triplet

Other designations
- UGC 6350, PGC 34697, VV 308b

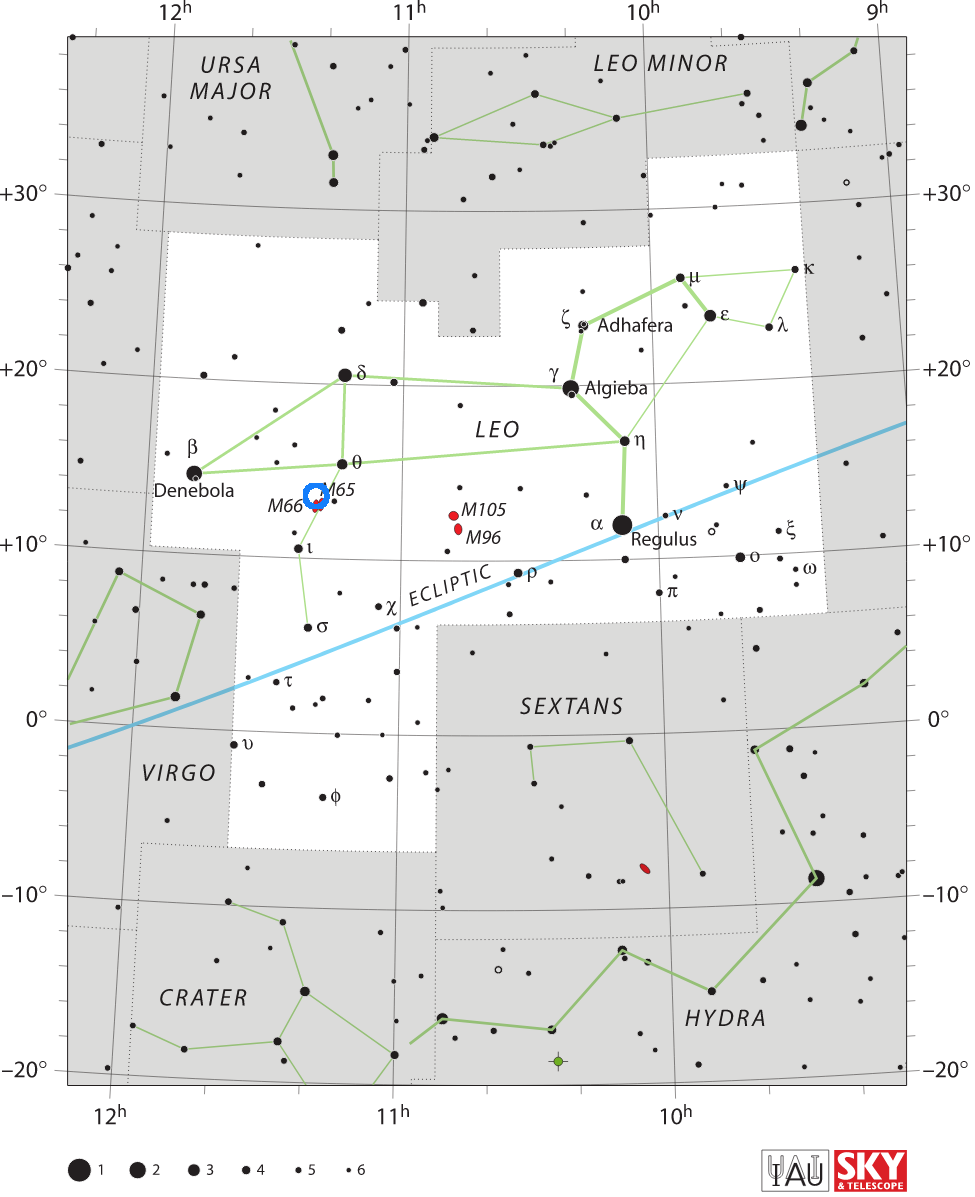
The location of NGC 3628 (circled in blue)

NGC 3628 is an unbarred spiral galaxy in the constellation Leo. Alternatively, it is known as the Hamburger Galaxy, Vanishing Galaxy, King Hamlet's Ghost, Sarah's Galaxy. It was discovered by German-British astronomer William Herschel in 1784. NGC 3628 is located at a distance of about 35 million light-years away, where it forms the Leo Triplet with M65 and M66, a small group of galaxies. Its most conspicuous feature is the broad and obscuring band of dust located along the outer edge of its spiral arms, effectively transecting the galaxy to the view from Earth. It has an approximately 300,000 light-years long tidal tail.

Due to the presence of an x-shaped bulge, visible in multiple wavelengths, it has been argued that NGC 3628 is instead a barred spiral galaxy with the bar seen end-on. Simulations have shown that bars often form in disk galaxies during interactions and mergers, and NGC 3628 is known to be interacting with its two large neighbors.

When viewed through a telescope, its often seen as a dim orb, as it has a relatively low surface brightness for a supposedly famous galaxy. Though, when viewed with a larger one, it begins to show off more of its intricate detail such as its prominent dust lane, obscuring its core.

The name "Hamburger Galaxy" is a reference to its shape resembling a hamburger, while the name "Sarah's Galaxy" is thought to refer to poet Sarah Williams (1837–1868), most famous for the poem "The Old Astronomer:"

Though my soul may set in darkness, it will rise in perfect light;
I have loved the stars too truly to be fearful of the night.

== Gallery ==
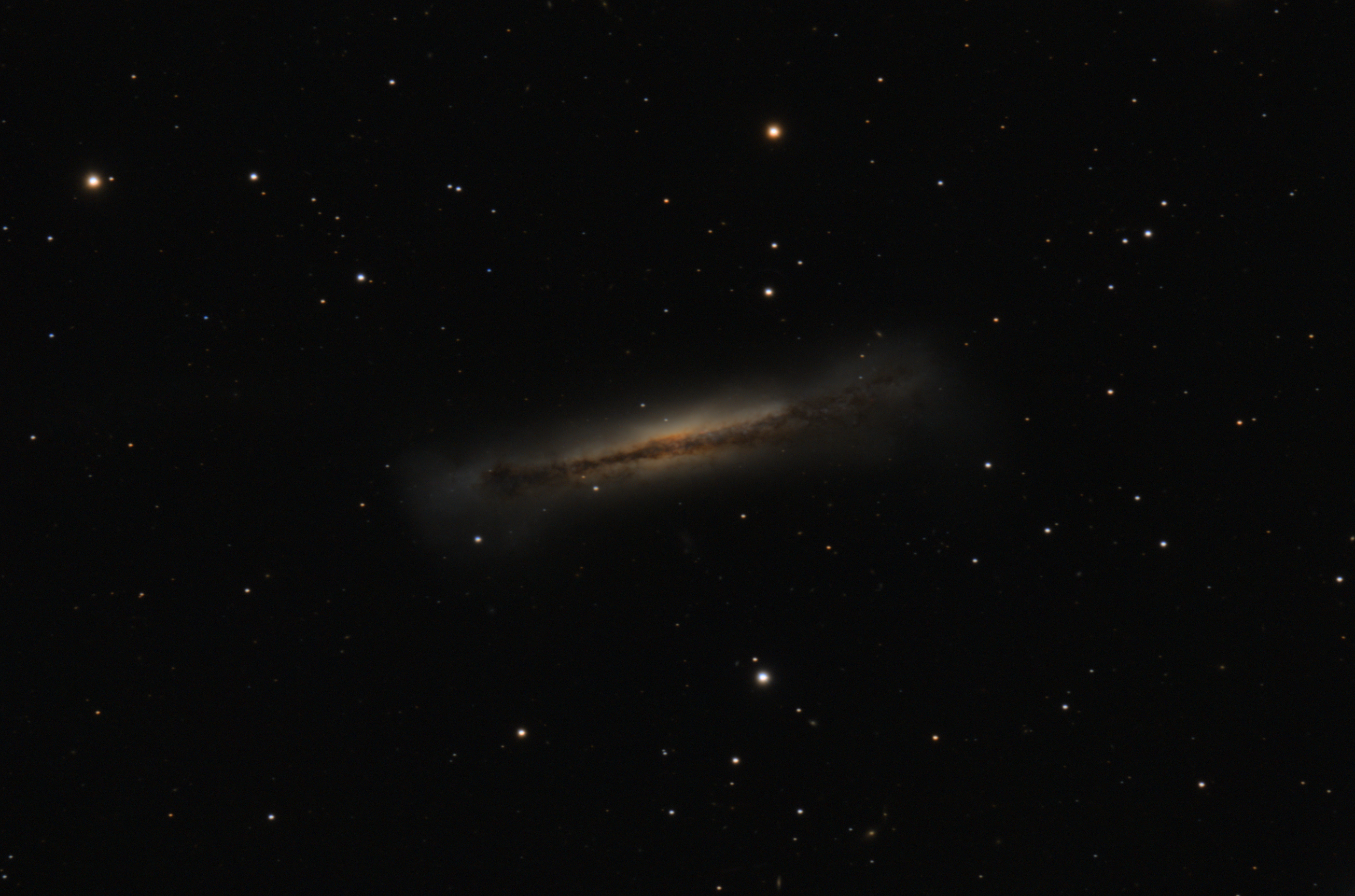
NGC 3628 captured with an amateur 8-inch telescope.

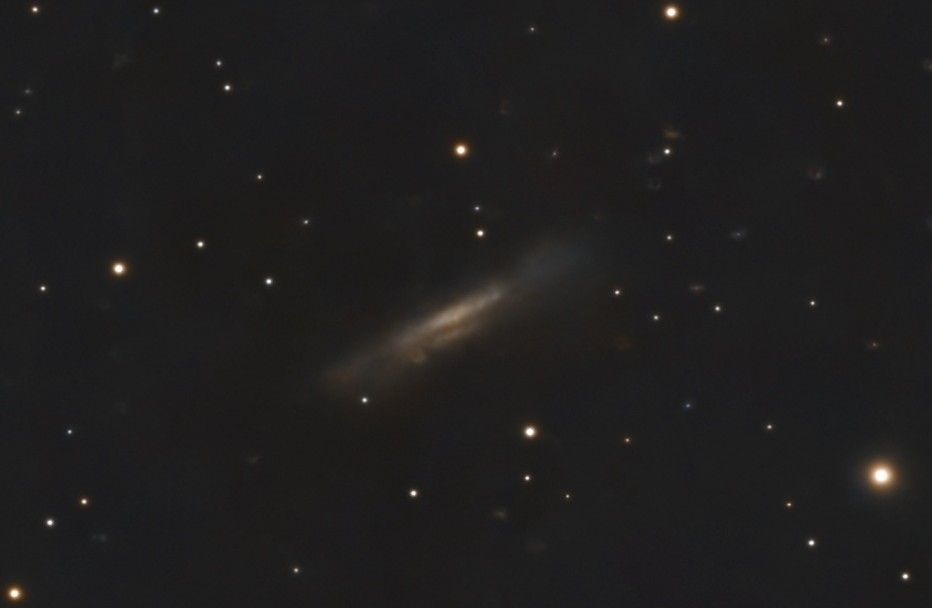
NGC 3628 Captured by Dwarf3 Smart Telescope
