= Messier 65 =

Intermediate spiral galaxy in the constellation Leo

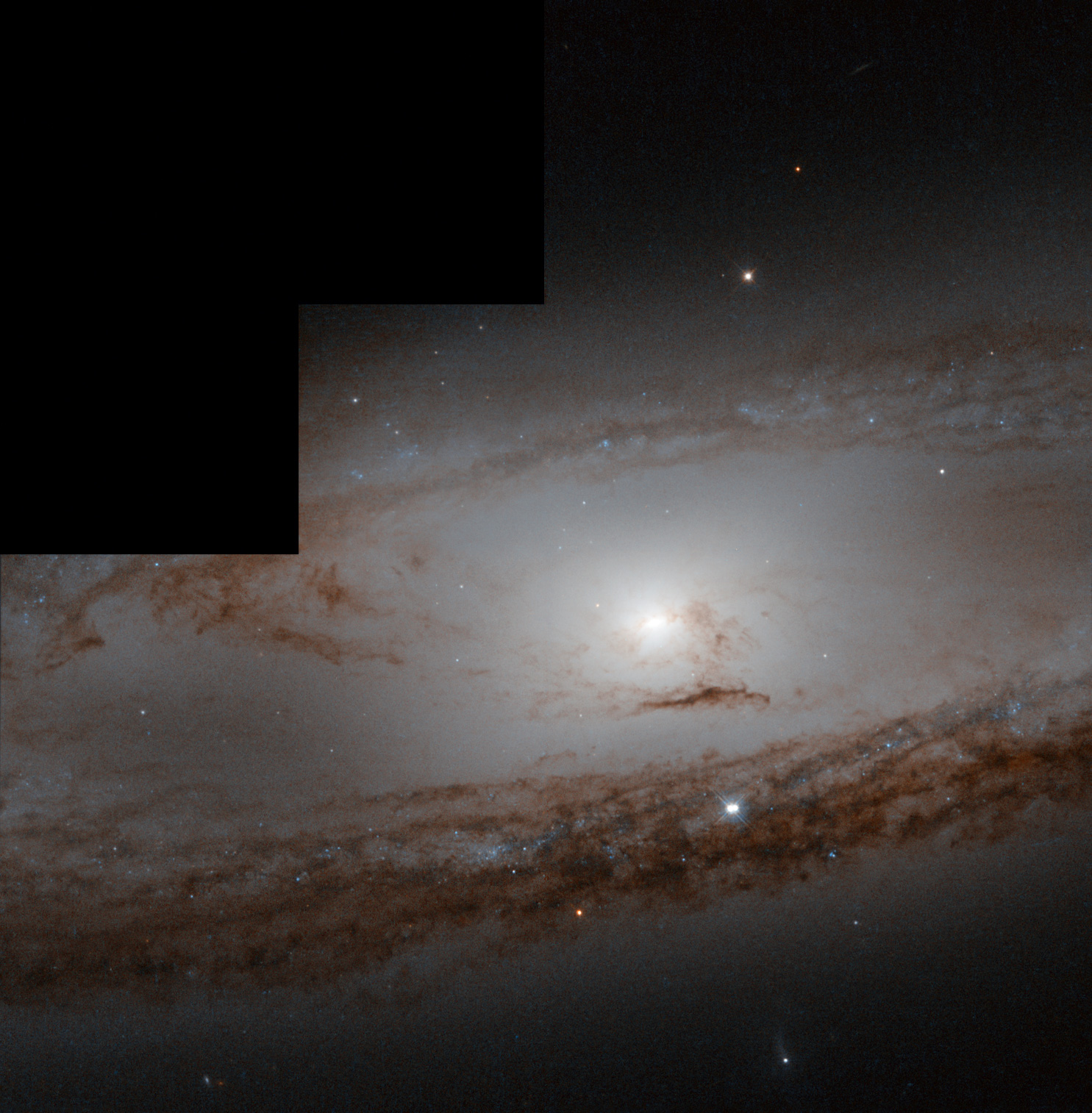
- Image taken by Hubble Space Telescope, December 30, 2013. Credit: ESA/Hubble & NASA

Observation data (J2000 epoch)
- Constellation: Leo
- Right ascension: 11^{h} 18^{m} 55.9^{s}
- Declination: +13° 05′ 32″
- Redshift: 0.002692±0.000010
- Heliocentric radial velocity: 807±3 km/s
- Galactocentric velocity: 723±5 km/s
- Distance: 41–42 Mly (12.57–12.88 Mpc)
- Apparent magnitude (V): 9.3

Characteristics
- Type: SAB(rs)a, LINER
- Size: 113,500 ly (34.76 kpc) (estimated)
- Apparent size (V): 8.709 × 2.454 moa

Other designations
- NGC 3623, UGC 6328, PGC 34612
- References: SIMBAD: Search M65

Messier 65 (also known as NGC 3623) is an intermediate spiral galaxy about 35 million light-years away in the constellation Leo, within its highly equatorial southern half. It was discovered by Charles Messier in 1780. With M66 and NGC 3628, it forms the Leo Triplet, a small close group of galaxies.

== Discovery ==
M65 was discovered by Charles Messier and included in his Messier Objects list. However, William Henry Smyth accidentally attributed the discovery to Pierre Méchain in his popular 19th-century astronomical work A Cycle of Celestial Objects (stating "They [M65 and M66] were pointed out by Méchain to Messier in 1780"). This error was, in turn, picked up by Kenneth Glyn Jones in Messier's Nebulae and Star Clusters. This has since ramified into a number of other books by a variety of authors.

== Star formation ==
The galaxy is low in dust and gas, and there is little star formation in it, although there has been some relatively recently in the arms. The ratio of old stars to new stars is correspondingly quite high. In most wavelengths, it is quite uninteresting, though there is a radio source visible in the NVSS, offset from the core by about two arc-minutes. The identity of the source is uncertain, as it has not been identified visually or formally studied in any published papers.

== Interaction with other galaxies ==
To the eye, M65's disk appears slightly warped, and its relatively recent burst of star formation is also suggestive of some external disturbance. Rots (1978) suggests that the two other galaxies in the Leo Triplet interacted with each other about 800 million years ago. Recent research by Zhiyu Duan suggests that M65 may also have interacted, though much less strongly. He also notes that M65 may have a central bar—it is difficult to tell because the galaxy is seen from an oblique angle—a feature which is suggestive of tidal disruption.

== Supernova ==
One supernova has been observed in Messier 65:

- SN 2013am (Type II, mag. 15.6) was discovered by Matsuo Sugano on 21 March 2013.

== Gallery ==
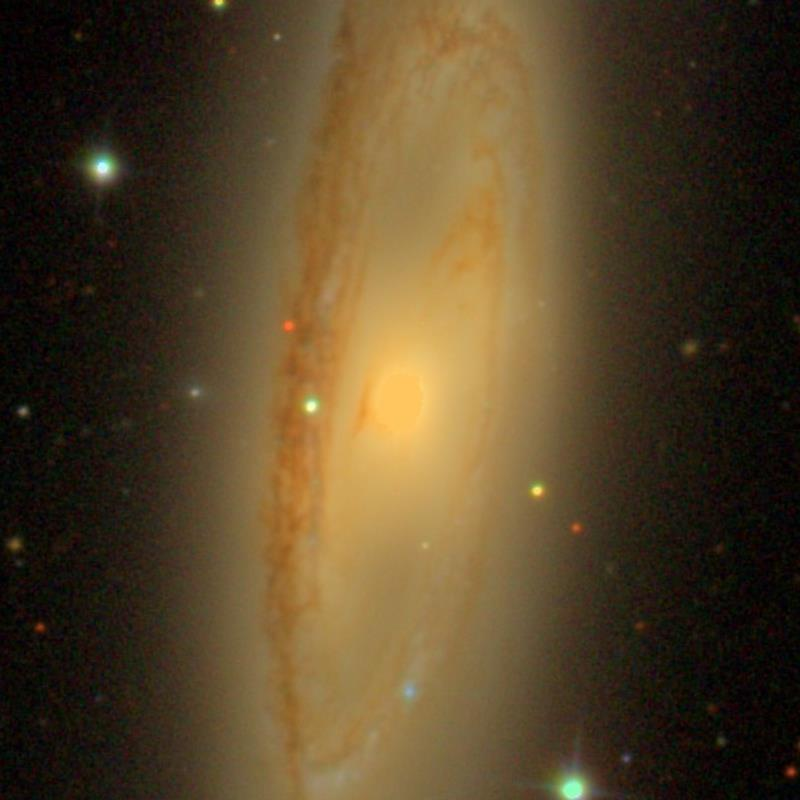
Messier 65 by the Sloan Digital Sky Survey

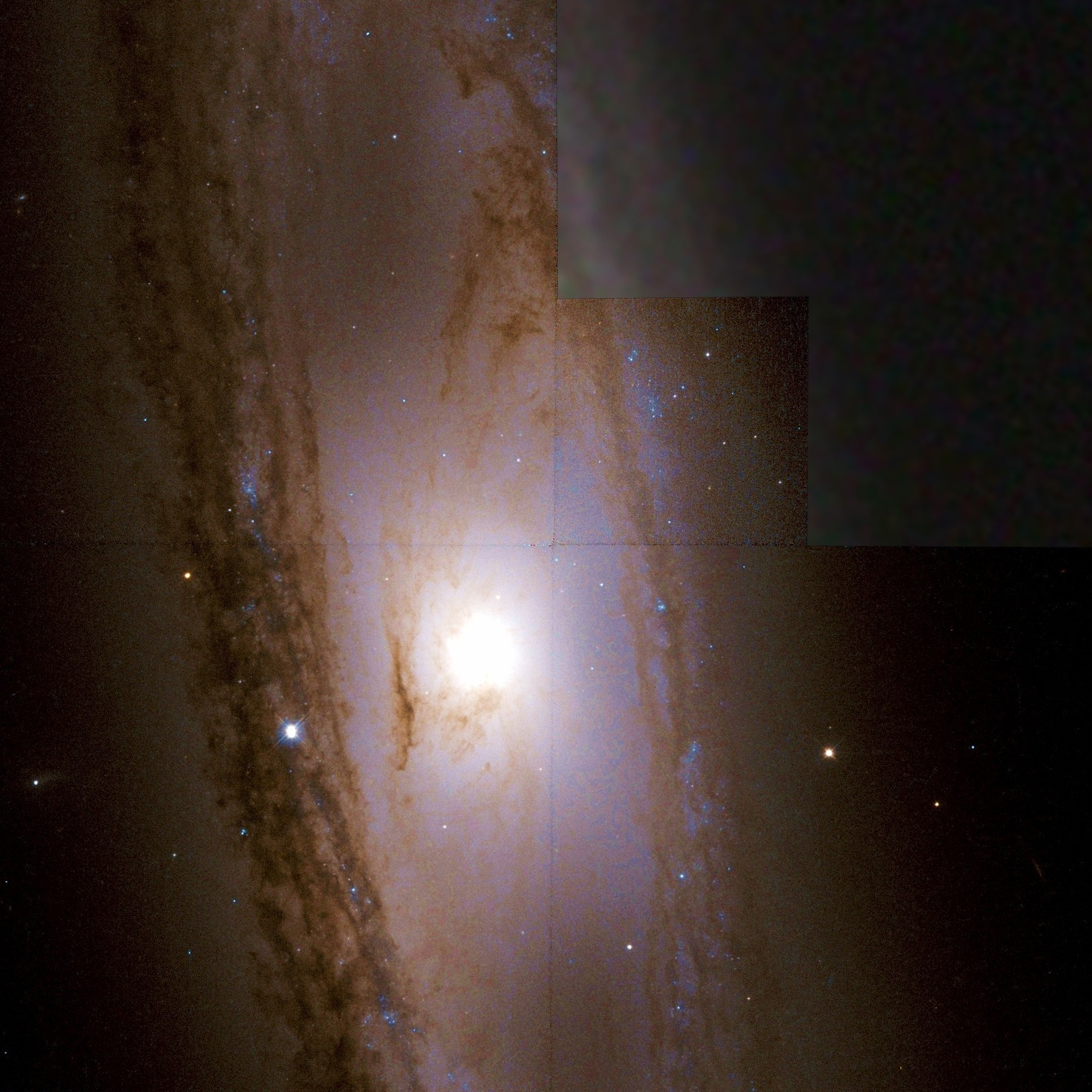
HST image of M65

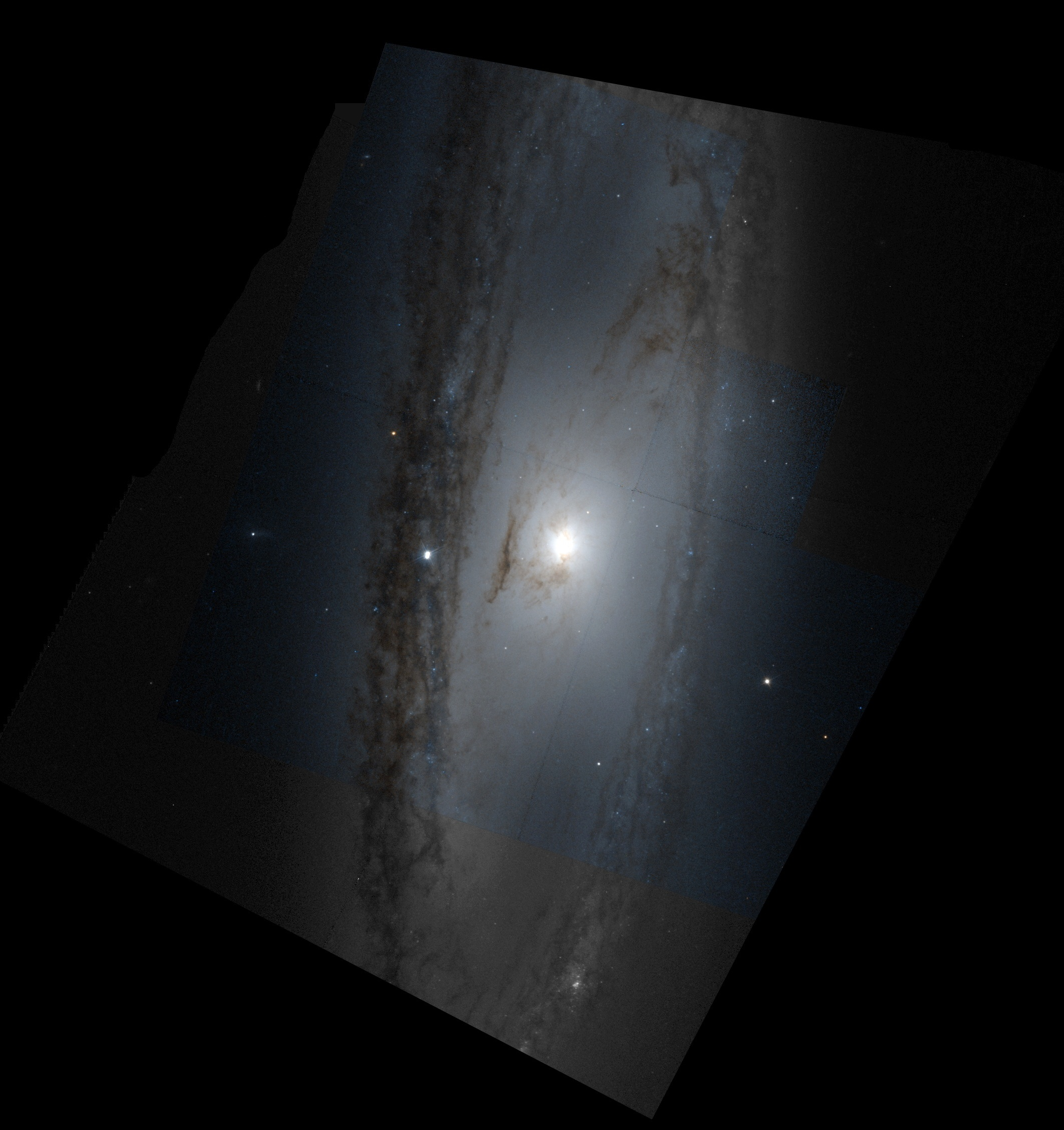
M65 by Hubble Space Telescope

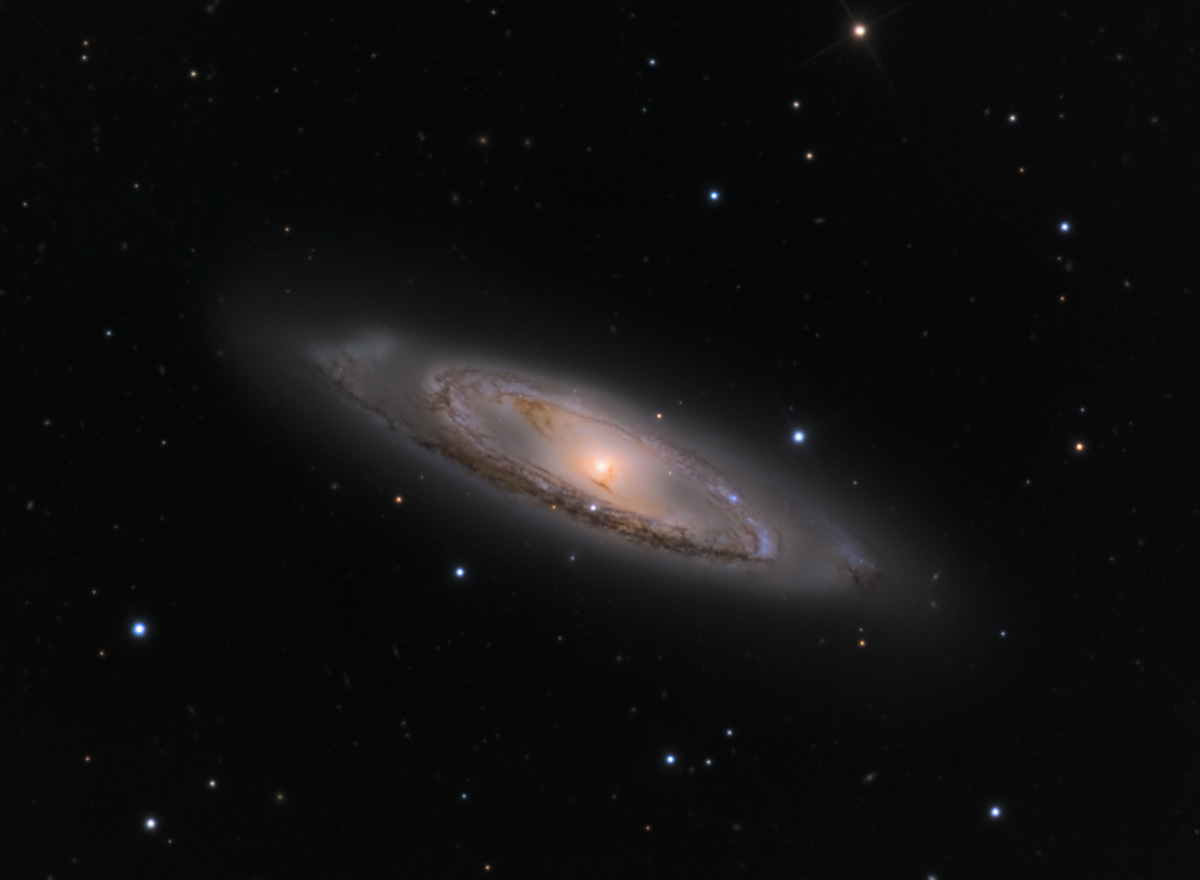
M65 as imaged from the Mount Lemmon Observatory

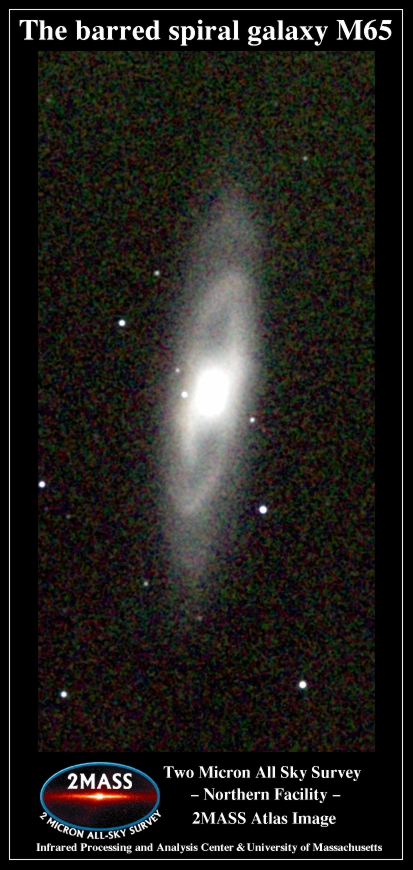
Messier 65 by 2MASS

== See also ==
- List of Messier objects
