= Messier 66 =

Galaxy in the constellation Leo

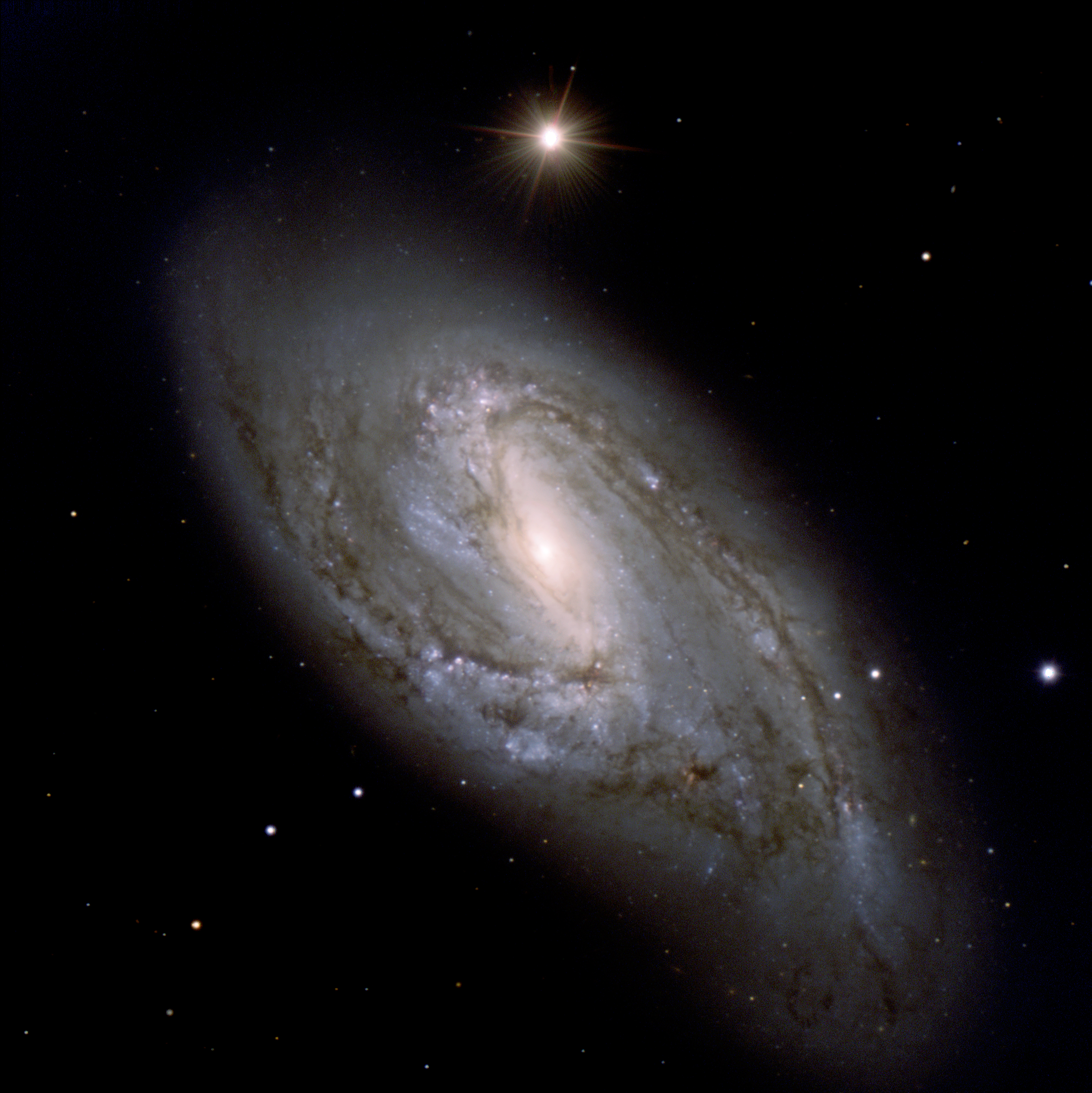
- A colour-composite image of M66

Observation data (J2000 epoch)
- Constellation: Leo
- Right ascension: 11^{h} 20^{m} 15.026^{s}
- Declination: +12° 59′ 28.64″
- Redshift: 0.002425±0.000010 (696.3±12.7 km/s)
- Distance: 31 Mly (9.6 Mpc)
- Apparent magnitude (V): 8.9

Characteristics
- Type: SAB(s)b
- Size: 85,200 ly (26.12 kpc) (estimated)
- Apparent size (V): 9.1′ × 4.2′
- Notable features: Galaxy in the Leo Triplet

Other designations
- Arp 16, NGC 3627, PGC 34695, UGC 6346

Messier 66 or M66, also known as NGC 3627, is an intermediate spiral galaxy located around 31 million light years from Earth in the equatorial half of the constellation Leo. This galaxy is a member of the Leo Triplet (M66 group), a small group of galaxies that includes M65 and NGC 3628. M66 has a morphological classification of SABb, indicating that it has a spiral shape with a weak bar feature and loosely wound arms.

It was discovered by French astronomer Charles Messier on 1 March 1780, who described it as "very long and very faint". Messier 65 and Messier 66 are a common object for amateur astronomic observation, being separated by only 20′.

== Characteristics ==
Messier 66 is an intermediate spiral galaxy. It has a weak bar and a loosely wounded spiral structure. It is about 95 thousand light-years across. The galaxy has striking dust lanes and bright star clusters along its spiral arms. It also has a well-developed central bulge. The isophotal axis ratio is 0.32, indicating that it is being viewed at an angle.

The galaxy has a high rate of star formation occurring in the spiral arms. Its rate of star formation is about 0.05 solar masses per year. These young stars ionize their surrounding environment.

=== Interaction ===
Gravitational interaction from its past encounter with neighboring NGC 3628 has resulted in an extremely high central mass concentration and a high molecular to atomic mass ratio. This also resulted in a resolved non-rotating clump of H I material apparently removed from one of the spiral arms. The latter feature shows up visually as an extremely prominent and unusual spiral arm and dust lane structures as originally noted in the Atlas of Peculiar Galaxies.

== Supernovae ==
Five supernovae have been observed in M66:

- SN 1973R (Type II, mag. 14.5) was discovered by Leonida Rosino on 19 December 1973.
- SN 1989B (Type Ia, mag. 13) was discovered by Robert Evans on 30 January 1989.
- SN 1997bs (type uncertain, mag. 17) was discovered by the Lick Observatory Supernova Search (LOSS) on 15 April 1997. This event was initially classified as a Type IIn supernova, but later analysis suggests that it is instead either a luminous blue variable, a "gap" transient, or a luminous red nova.
- SN 2009hd (Type II, mag. 15.8) was discovered by Berto Monard on 2 July 2009.
- SN 2016cok (Type II-P, mag. 16.6) was discovered by the All Sky Automated Survey for Supernovae on 28 May 2016.

== Gallery ==
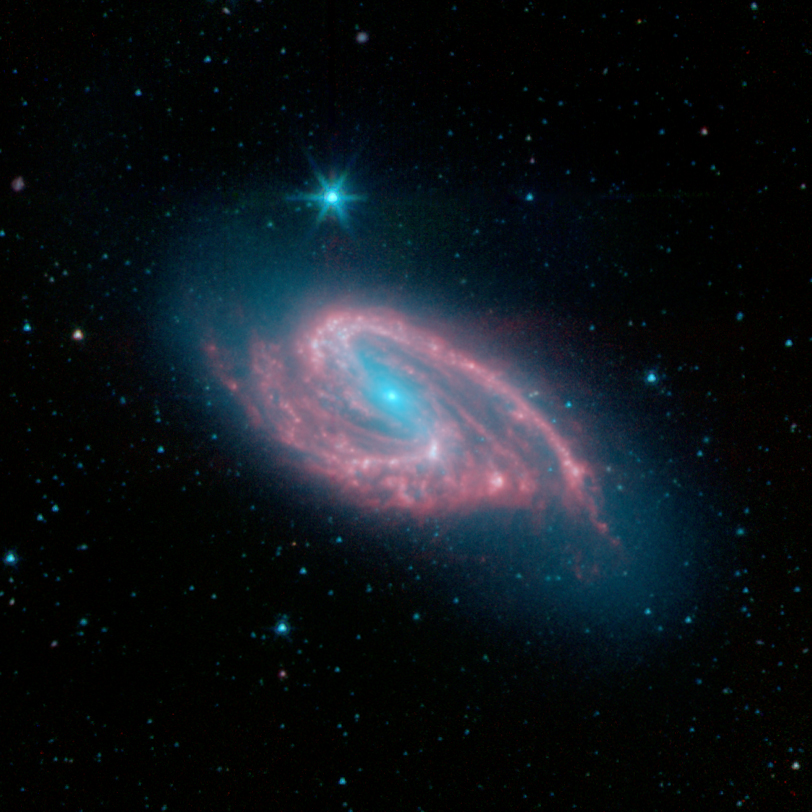
Infrared false color view of M66 from the Spitzer Space Telescope

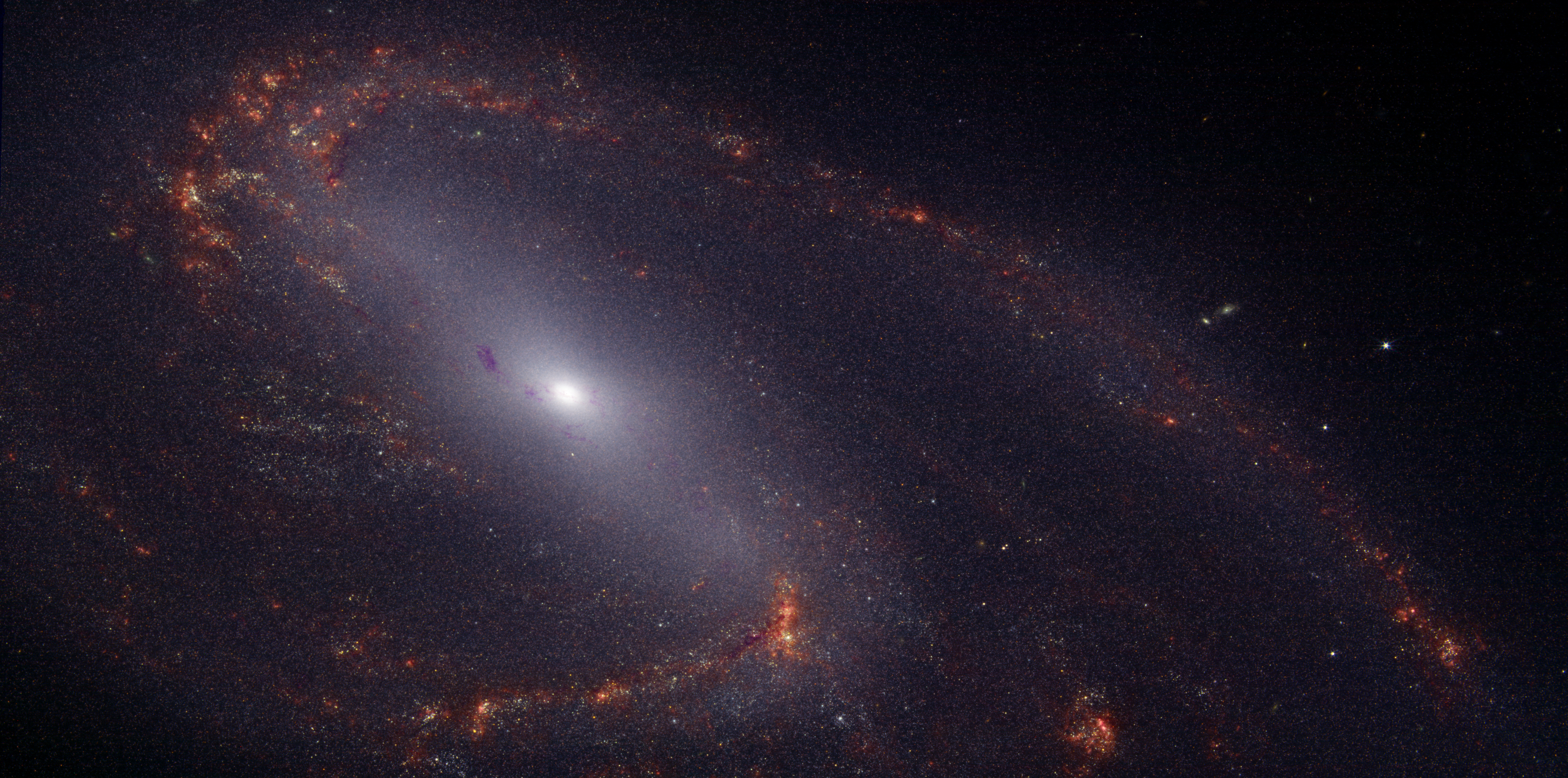
Infrared false color view of M66 from the James Webb Space Telescope

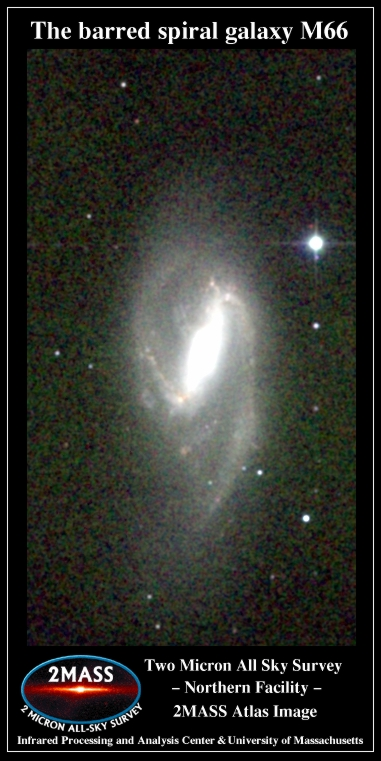
Messier 66 by 2MASS

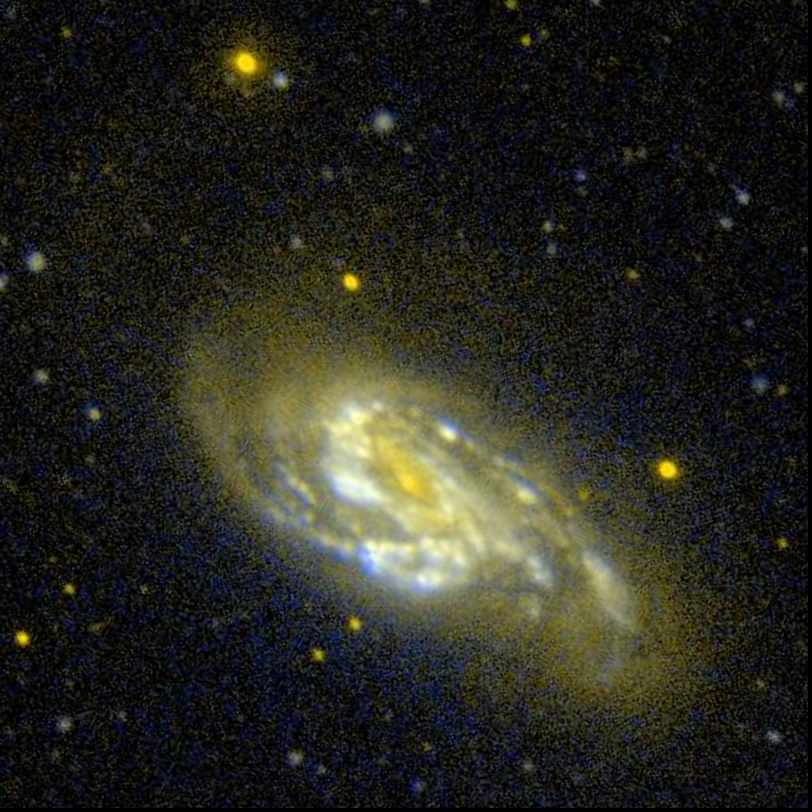
An ultraviolet image of Messier 66 by GALEX

== See also ==
- List of Messier objects
