= Intermediate spiral galaxy =

Galaxy type intermediate between a spiral galaxy and barred spiral galaxy

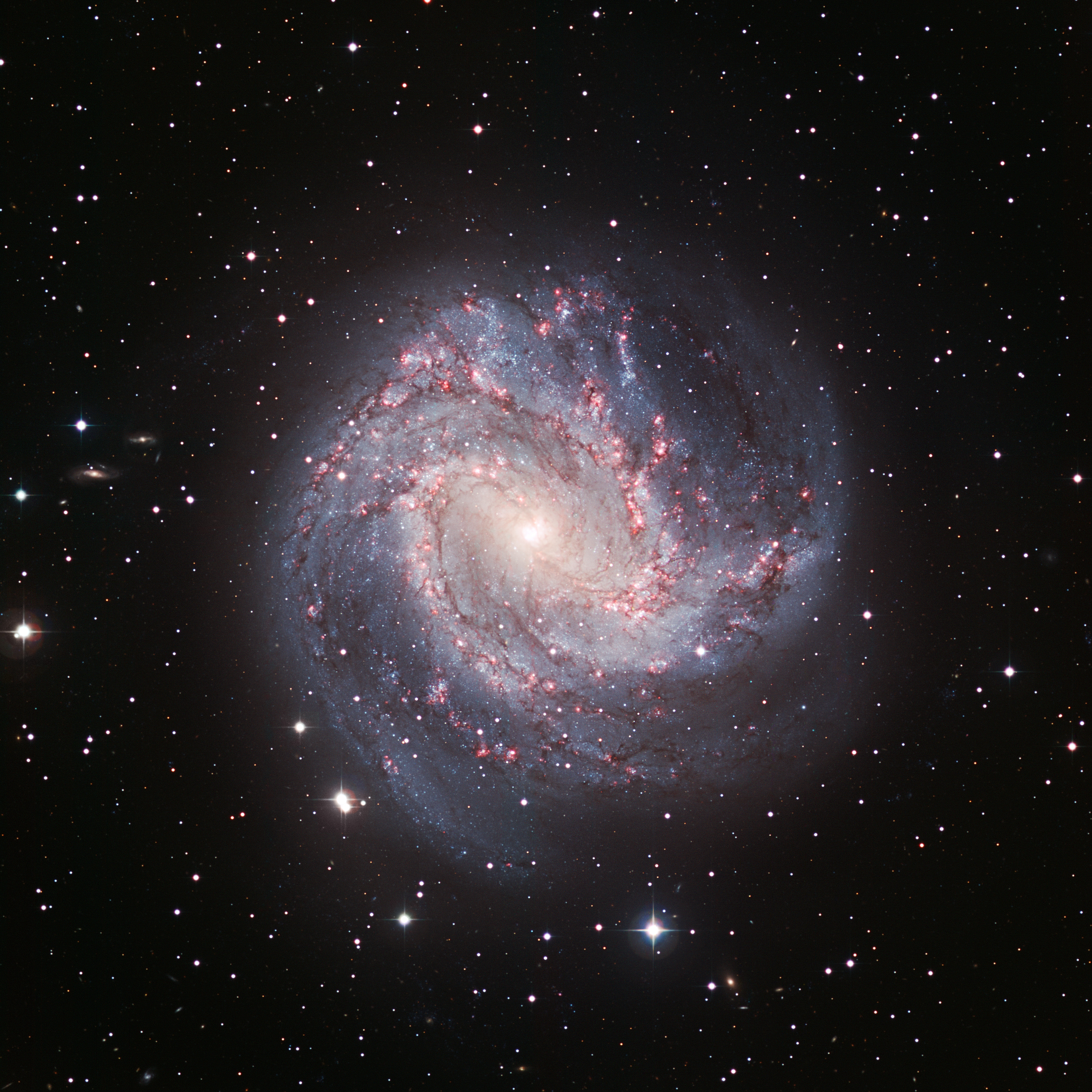
Messier 83 is an intermediate spiral galaxy of type SABc located in the constellation Hydra.

An intermediate spiral galaxy is a galaxy that is in between the classifications of a barred spiral galaxy and an unbarred spiral galaxy. It is designated as SAB in the galaxy morphological classification system devised by Gerard de Vaucouleurs, and is also known as a weakly barred spiral galaxy. Subtypes are labeled as SAB0, SABa, SABb, or SABc, following a sequence analogous to the Hubble sequence for barred and unbarred spirals. The subtype (0, a, b, or c) is based on the relative prominence of the central bulge and how tightly wound the spiral arms are.

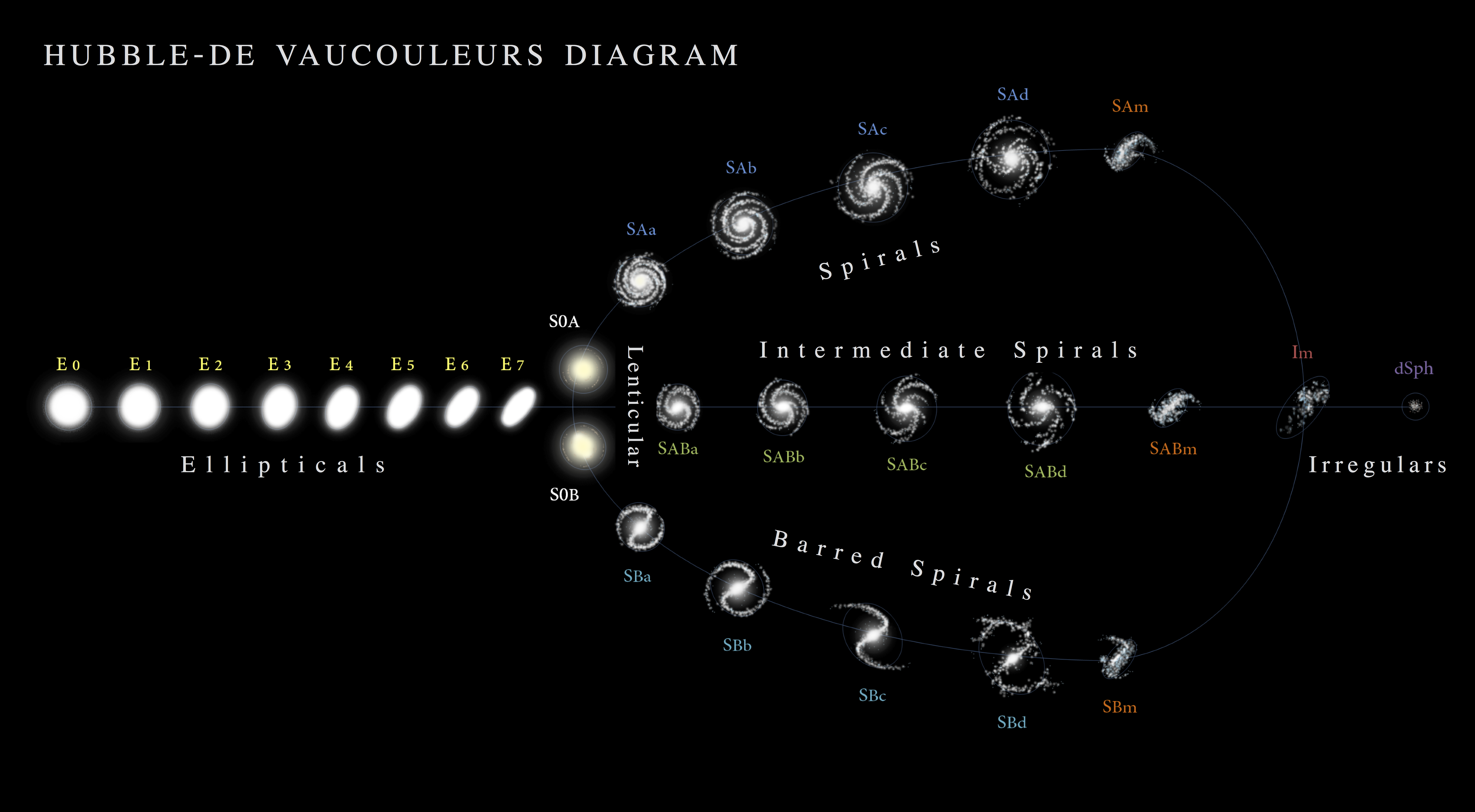
Diagram of the Hubble - de Vaucouleurs morphological classification system illustrating the class of intermediate spirals.

== Examples ==
Example	Type	Image	Information	Notes
	SAB0-		SAB0- is a type of lenticular galaxy	
	SAB0		SAB0 is a type of lenticular galaxy	
	SAB0+		SAB0+ is a type of lenticular galaxy	
	SAB0/a		SAB0/a can also be considered a type of intermediate lenticular galaxy	
Messier 65	SABa			M65 is an "SAB(rs)a"
NGC 4725	SABab			NGC 4725 is an "SAB(r)ab pec"
Messier 66	SABb			M66 is an "SAB(s)b"
Messier 106	SABbc			M106 is an "SAB(s)bc"
Sculptor Galaxy	SABc			Sculptor is an "SAB(s)c"
NGC 2403	SABcd			NGC 2403 is an "SAB(s)cd"
	SABd			
	SABdm		SABdm can also be considered a type of intermediate Magellanic spiral	
NGC 4625	SABm		SABm is a type of Magellanic spiral (Sm)	NGC 4625 is an "SAB(rs)m pec"
Fireworks Galaxy	SAB(rs)cd	NGC6946 Galaxy from the Mount Lemmon SkyCenter Schulman Telescope courtesy Adam Block		NGC 4625 is an "SAB(rs)cd"
