= List of stars in Pictor =

This is the list of notable stars in the constellation Pictor, sorted by decreasing brightness.

Name	B	Var	HD	HIP	RA	Dec	vis. mag.	abs. mag.	Dist. (ly)	Sp. class	Notes
α Pic	α		50241	32607	06^{h} 48^{m} 11.54^{s}	−61° 56′ 31.1″	3.30	0.83	99	A7IV	
β Pic	β		39060	27321	05^{h} 47^{m} 17.08^{s}	−51° 04′ 00.2″	3.85	2.42	63	A5V	δ Sct variable, V_{max} = 3.80^{m}, V_{min} = 3.86^{m}, P = 0.026260 d; has a protoplanetary disk and has two planets (b & c)
γ Pic	γ		39523	27530	05^{h} 49^{m} 49.58^{s}	−56° 09′ 59.4″	4.50	0.87	174	K1III	
δ Pic	δ		42933	29276	06^{h} 10^{m} 17.91^{s}	−54° 58′ 07.2″	4.72	−3.81	1655	B0.5IV	β Lyr variable, V_{max} = 4.65^{m}, V_{min} = 4.9^{m}, P = 1.672541 d
HD 42540			42540	28991	06^{h} 07^{m} 03.36^{s}	−62° 09′ 15.9″	5.04	−0.37	394	K2/K3III	47 G. Pic or μ Dor
η^{2} Pic	η^{2}		33042	23649	05^{h} 04^{m} 57.95^{s}	−49° 34′ 40.2″	5.05	−0.76	474	M2IIIvar	suspected variable, V_{max} = 5.00^{m}, V_{min} = 5.1^{m}
HD 39640			39640	27621	05^{h} 50^{m} 53.22^{s}	−52° 06′ 31.3″	5.16	0.61	264	G8III	
HD 46355			46355	30932	06^{h} 29^{m} 28.54^{s}	−56° 51′ 10.2″	5.20	0.29	312	K0III	
HD 40292			40292	27947	05^{h} 54^{m} 50.11^{s}	−52° 38′ 09.9″	5.29	2.58	114	F0Ve...	
λ Pic	λ		30185	21914	04^{h} 42^{m} 46.46^{s}	−50° 28′ 53.1″	5.30	0.19	343	K0/K1III	
HD 38871			38871	27243	05^{h} 46^{m} 27.37^{s}	−46° 35′ 50.0″	5.31	−0.44	460	K0/K1II	
η^{1} Pic	η^{1}		32743	23482	05^{h} 02^{m} 48.73^{s}	−49° 09′ 05.3″	5.37	3.28	85	F2V	
ζ Pic	ζ		35072	24829	05^{h} 19^{m} 22.11^{s}	−50° 36′ 23.5″	5.44	2.65	118	F7III-IV	
HD 36553			36553	25768	05^{h} 30^{m} 09.46^{s}	−47° 04′ 38.4″	5.46	2.26	143	G3IV	
ι Pic A	ι		31203	22531	04^{h} 50^{m} 55.39^{s}	−53° 27′ 42.2″	5.58	2.73	121	F0IV...	
ν Pic	ν		45229	30342	06^{h} 22^{m} 55.87^{s}	−56° 22′ 11.7″	5.60	2.09	164	Am	
HD 41214			41214	28484	06^{h} 00^{m} 49.20^{s}	−51° 12′ 59.6″	5.65	1.65	206	A1m...	
μ Pic	μ		46860	31137	06^{h} 31^{m} 58.31^{s}	−58° 45′ 13.8″	5.69	−1.04	724	B9V	suspected variable
HD 45557			45557	30463	06^{h} 24^{m} 13.88^{s}	−60° 16′ 53.0″	5.78	1.06	287	A0V	
HD 40733			40733	28287	05^{h} 58^{m} 37.56^{s}	−44° 02′ 04.5″	5.81	−2.13	1264	G8II	
HD 45984			45984	30703	06^{h} 27^{m} 04.14^{s}	−58° 00′ 07.6″	5.82	−0.53	606	K3III	
HD 36734			36734	25887	05^{h} 31^{m} 35.99^{s}	−45° 55′ 31.5″	5.86	0.07	468	K3III	
HD 39937			39937	27737	05^{h} 52^{m} 20.18^{s}	−57° 09′ 21.6″	5.93	0.41	415	F7IV	
HD 34347			34347	24384	05^{h} 13^{m} 53.33^{s}	−52° 01′ 50.6″	6.03	−0.63	701	K3III	
HD 35765			35765	25317	05^{h} 24^{m} 55.58^{s}	−44° 13′ 32.5″	6.09	0.03	532	K1III	
κ Pic	κ		35580	25098	05^{h} 22^{m} 22.15^{s}	−56° 08′ 04.0″	6.10	−0.71	749	B8/B9V	
TX Pic		TX	37434	26300	05^{h} 36^{m} 02.85^{s}	−47° 18′ 49.4″	6.10	0.08	522	K2III	RS CVn variable, V_{max} = 6.08^{m}, V_{min} = 6.12^{m}
HD 40200			40200	27937	05^{h} 54^{m} 41.12^{s}	−49° 37′ 37.4″	6.11	−1.53	1101	B3V	
HD 50571			50571	32775	06^{h} 50^{m} 01.01^{s}	−60° 14′ 57.9″	6.11	3.51	108	F7III-IV	has a planet (b)
AE Pic		AE	46792	31068	06^{h} 31^{m} 10.65^{s}	−61° 52′ 46.5″	6.15	−1.58	1148	B3V	β Lyr variable
HD 39110			39110	27317	05^{h} 47^{m} 13.33^{s}	−54° 21′ 38.6″	6.19	−1.68	1221	K3III	
AK Pic		AK	48189	31711	06^{h} 38^{m} 00.42^{s}	−61° 32′ 00.8″	6.18	4.47	71	G1/G2V	T Tau star, ΔV = 0.05^{m}, P = 2.60 d
HD 33116			33116	23653	05^{h} 05^{m} 00.61^{s}	−54° 24′ 26.7″	6.26	−0.40	700	M2III	semiregular variable
θ Pic	θ		35860	25303	05^{h} 24^{m} 46.29^{s}	−52° 18′ 58.2″	6.26	0.19	534	A0V	
HD 45796			45796	30524	06^{h} 24^{m} 55.81^{s}	−63° 49′ 41.4″	6.26	−0.43	710	B6V	suspected variable
HD 45461			45461	30352	06^{h} 23^{m} 01.48^{s}	−63° 40′ 59.4″	6.30	−1.28	1069	M1III	
HD 39547			39547	27583	05^{h} 50^{m} 28.83^{s}	−52° 46′ 04.5″	6.32	−0.84	883	K0/K1III	
R Pic		R	30551	22170	04^{h} 46^{m} 09.55^{s}	−49° 14′ 45.1″	6.35		6700	M2.5:IIe	semiregular variable, V_{max} = 6.35^{m}, V_{min} = 10.1^{m}, P = 168 d
HD 38458	ε		38458	27001	05^{h} 43^{m} 41.12^{s}	−45° 49′ 59.2″	6.38	1.82	266	F0IIIn	suspected variable, named ε by Lacaille but dropped by Gould
HD 39312			39312	27512	05^{h} 49^{m} 34.13^{s}	−44° 52′ 31.5″	6.38	−1.79	1405	K1III	
ι Pic B	ι		31204	22534	04^{h} 50^{m} 56.58^{s}	−53° 27′ 35.7″	6.42	3.89	105	F0IV	
HD 37226			37226	26079	05^{h} 33^{m} 44.30^{s}	−54° 54′ 08.3″	6.42	2.67	183	F8V	
HD 37781			37781	26515	05^{h} 38^{m} 17.42^{s}	−50° 38′ 27.7″	6.43	0.41	522	A0V	
HD 44120			44120	29788	06^{h} 16^{m} 18.84^{s}	−59° 12′ 45.8″	6.44	3.64	119	G1V	
SW Pic		SW	41586	28596	06^{h} 02^{m} 09.32^{s}	−60° 05′ 48.7″	6.45	−0.61	825	M4III	semiregular variable, ΔV = 0.12^{m}
HD 29805			29805	21666	04^{h} 39^{m} 04.29^{s}	−51° 40′ 22.1″	6.45	−0.07	656	K2III	
HD 45701			45701	30480	06^{h} 24^{m} 26.57^{s}	−63° 25′ 43.1″	6.45	3.94	104	G3III/IV	
HD 45450			45450	30423	06^{h} 23^{m} 46.92^{s}	−58° 32′ 38.2″	6.47	1.52	319	A3V	
HD 34587			34587	24520	05^{h} 15^{m} 38.80^{s}	−52° 10′ 56.0″	6.48	−0.62	856	K2III	
HD 40665			40665	28180	05^{h} 57^{m} 14.36^{s}	−53° 25′ 32.5″	6.48	−0.24	720	K5/M0III	
S Pic		S	33894	24126	05^{h} 10^{m} 57.25^{s}	−48° 30′ 25.45″	6.50		1330	M7e	Mira variable, V_{max} = 6.5^{m}, V_{min} = 14.0^{m}, P = 422 d
HD 33331		TU	33331	23833	05^{h} 07^{m} 25.93^{s}	−44° 49′ 18.0″	6.93		964	B5III	slowly pulsating B star, ΔV = 0.03^{m}, P = 1.14686 d
HD 40307			40307	27887	05^{h} 54^{m} 04.24^{s}	−60° 01′ 24.4″	7.17	6.63	42	K2.5V	has six planets (b, c, d, e, f and g)
TV Pic		TV	30861	22370	04^{h} 48^{m} 57.47^{s}	−47° 08′ 04.3″	7.44		634	A2V	rotating ellipsoidal variable, V_{max} = 7.37^{m}, V_{min} = 7.53^{m}, P = 0.851994 d
HD 41004			41004	28393	05^{h} 59^{m} 49.65^{s}	−48° 14′ 22.9″	8.65	5.48	140	K1V+M2	double star, has a planet (Ab) and a brown dwarf (Bb)
HD 41248			41248	28460	06^{h} 00^{m} 33.0^{s}	−56° 09′ 43″	8.82		171	G2V	has two planets (b and c)
Kapteyn's Star		VZ	33793	24186	05^{h} 11^{m} 40.58^{s}	−45° 01′ 26.3″	8.89	10.92	13	M1V	nearest halo star; BY Dra variable; has two planets (b and c)
AB Pic		AB	44627	30034	06^{h} 19^{m} 12.91^{s}	−58° 03′ 15.5″	9.21	5.87	148	K2V	T Tau star, ΔV = 0.045^{m}, P = 3.853 d has a planet or a brown dwarf (b)
RR Pic		RR		31481	06^{h} 35^{m} 36.06^{s}	−62° 38′ 24.3″	12.50				nova, V_{max} = 1.0^{m}, V_{min} = 12.65^{m}, P = 0.145025 d
TW Pic		TW			05^{h} 34^{m} 50.58^{s}	−58° 01′ 40.7″					nova-like star
PSR J0437-4715					04^{h} 37^{m} 15.81^{s}	−47° 15′ 08.6″			509.8		closest known millisecond pulsar
WISE 0647-6232					06^{h} 47^{m} 23.23^{s}	−62° 32′ 39.7″				Y1	brown dwarf
Table legend: • Name = Proper name • B = Bayer designation • F or/and G. = Flamsteed designation or Gould designation • Var = Variable star designation • HD = Henry Draper Catalogue designation number • HIP = Hipparcos Catalogue designation number • RA = Right ascension for the Epoch/Equinox J2000.0 • Dec = Declination for the Epoch/Equinox J2000.0 • vis. mag. = visual magnitude (m or m_{v}), also known as apparent magnitude • abs. mag. = absolute magnitude (M_{v}) • Dist. (ly) = Distance in light-years from Earth • Sp. class = Spectral class of the star in the stellar classification system • Notes = Common name(s) or alternate name(s); comments; notable properties [for example: multiple star status, range of variability if it is a variable star, exoplanets, etc.]

== See also ==
- List of stars by constellation
