= Eta Pictoris =

The Bayer designation η Pictoris (Eta Pictoris) is shared by two stars, in the constellation Pictor:

- η^{1} Pictoris (HD 32743)
- η^{2} Pictoris (HD 33042)
