= NGC 1998 =

Galaxy in the constellation Pictor

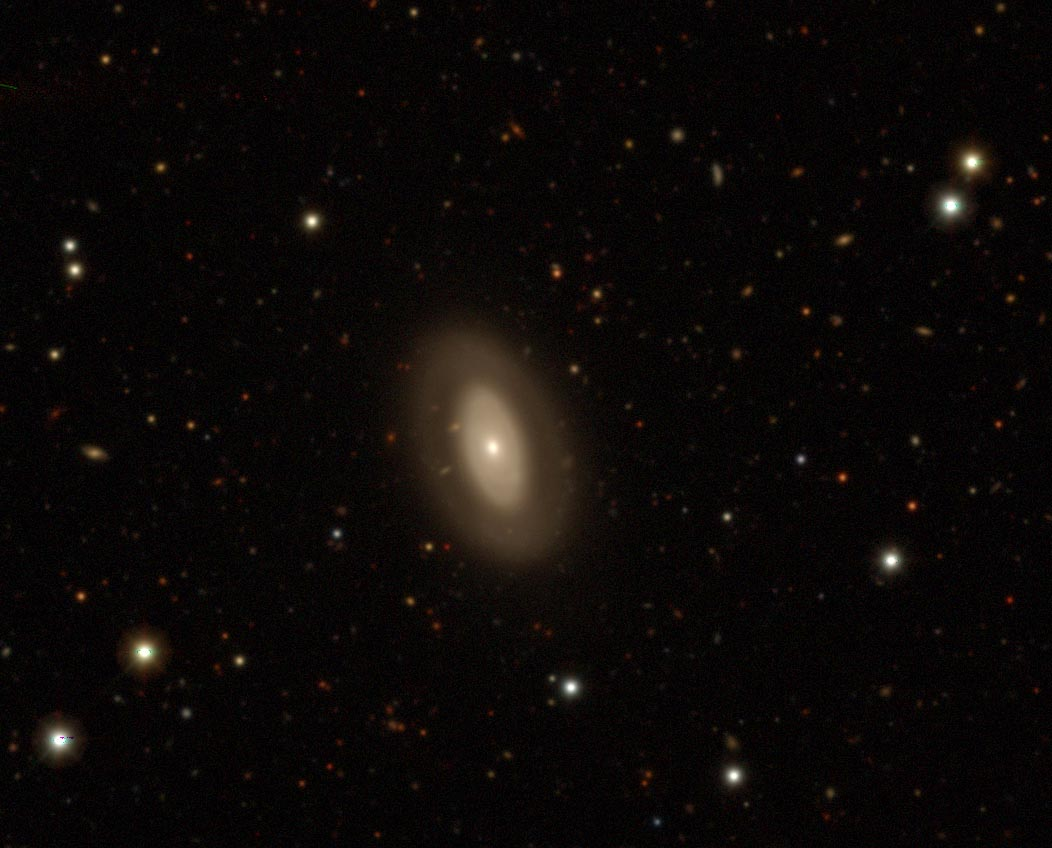
- NGC 1998, top-right from it is NGC 1995

Observation data (J2000.0 epoch)
- Constellation: Pictor
- Right ascension: 05^{h} 33^{m} 15.7^{s}
- Declination: −48° 41′ 44″
- Redshift: 0.015137
- Heliocentric radial velocity: 4538
- Distance: 207 million
- Apparent magnitude (V): 14.3
- Apparent magnitude (B): 15.2

Characteristics
- Type: SO
- Size: 0.90 x 0.5 arc minutes

Other designations
- ESO 204-15, PGC 17434

NGC 1998 (also known as ESO 204-15, PGC 17434) is a lenticular galaxy located in the constellation Pictor. It was discovered by John Herschel on December 28, 1834 and is about 207 million light-years from the Milky Way. Its apparent magnitude is 14.3. and its size is 0.90 by 0.5 arc minutes. In some sources such as SIMBAD, it is misidentified as nearby double star NGC 1995.
