= Pictor in Chinese astronomy =

The modern constellation Pictor lies across one of the quadrants symbolized by the Vermillion Bird of the South (南方朱雀, Nán Fāng Zhū Què) and The Southern Asterisms (近南極星區, Jìnnánjíxīngōu), that divide the sky in traditional Chinese uranography.

The name of the western constellation in modern Chinese is 繪架座 (huì jià zuò), meaning "the easel constellation".

== Stars ==
The map of Chinese constellation in constellation Pictor area consists of :

| Four Symbols | Mansion (Chinese name) | Romanization | Translation | Asterisms (Chinese name) | Romanization | Translation | Western star name | Chinese star name | Romanization | Translation |
|---|---|---|---|---|---|---|---|---|---|---|
| Vermilion Bird of the South (南方朱雀) | 井 | Jǐng | Well | 老人 | Lǎorén | Old Man | β Pic | 老人增四 | Jīnyúzēngsì | 4th additional star |
| - | 近南極星區 (non-mansions) | Jìnnánjíxīngōu (non-mansions) | The Southern Asterisms (non-mansions) | 金魚 | Jīnyú | Goldfish | α Pic | 金魚增一 | Jīnyúzēngyī | 1st additional star |

== See also ==
- Traditional Chinese star names
- Chinese constellations
