= NGC 2115 =

Galaxy in the constellation Pictor

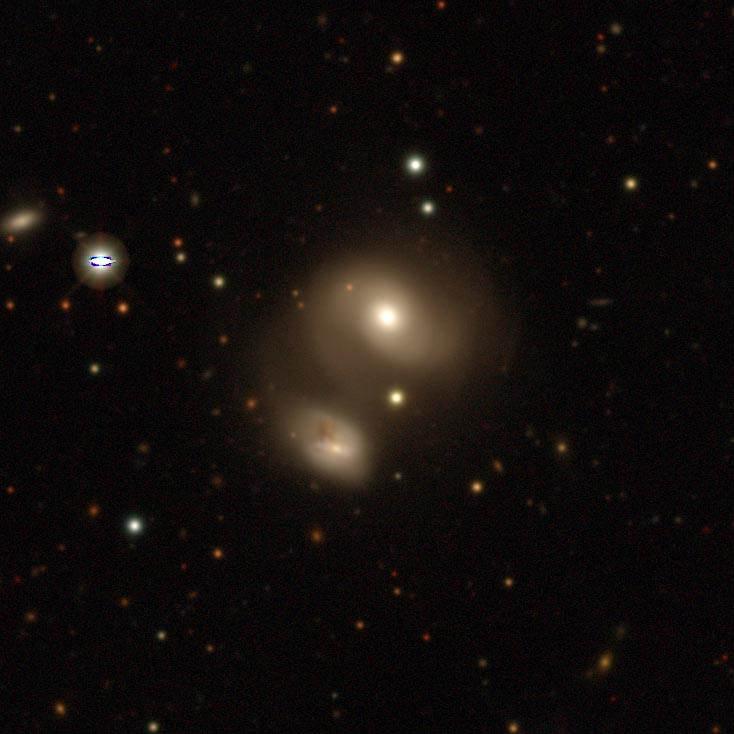
- NGC 2115 (center) with PGC 18002 (below and to left of center) imaged by Legacy Surveys

Observation data (J2000 epoch)
- Constellation: Pictor
- Right ascension: 05^{h} 51^{m} 19.8104^{s}
- Declination: −50° 34′ 58.304″
- Redshift: 0.023389±0.0000730
- Heliocentric radial velocity: 7,012±22 km/s
- Distance: 340.9 ± 23.9 Mly (104.52 ± 7.33 Mpc)
- Apparent magnitude (V): 14.15

Characteristics
- Type: S0+? pec
- Size: ~229,500 ly (70.35 kpc) (estimated)
- Apparent size (V): 1.1′ × 0.5′

Other designations
- ESO 205- G 006 NED01, 2MASX J05511983-5034582, PGC 18001

NGC 2115 is a large lenticular galaxy in the constellation of Pictor. Its velocity with respect to the cosmic microwave background is 7,087±23 km/s, which corresponds to a Hubble distance of 340.9 ± 23.9 Mly (104.52 ± 7.33 Mpc). It was discovered by British astronomer John Herschel on 4 January 1837.

== Pair of interacting galaxies ==
The apparent magnitude of PGC 18002, the galaxy further south, is 15.1 and was certainly not observed by Herschel. The radial velocities of these two galaxies are almost equal, so they are at the same distance from us and, judging by their shape, they are in gravitational interaction.

== Identification ==
In the NASA/IPAC Extragalactic Database, NGC 2115 appears as a pair of galaxies. To view the data for NGC 2115, it must be identified as NGC 2115A or PGC 18001. The other galaxy in the pair is identified in this database as NGC 2115B, which is PGC 18002. [Note: This can cause confusion, as other databases, such as SIMBAD, identify PGC 18002 as NGC 2115A.]

== Supernova ==
One supernova has been observed in NGC 2115:

- SN 2021clw (Type Ia, mag. 16.7) was discovered by ASAS-SN on 10 February 2021.

== See also ==
- List of NGC objects (2001–3000)
