= NGC 1803 =

Barred spiral galaxy in Pictor

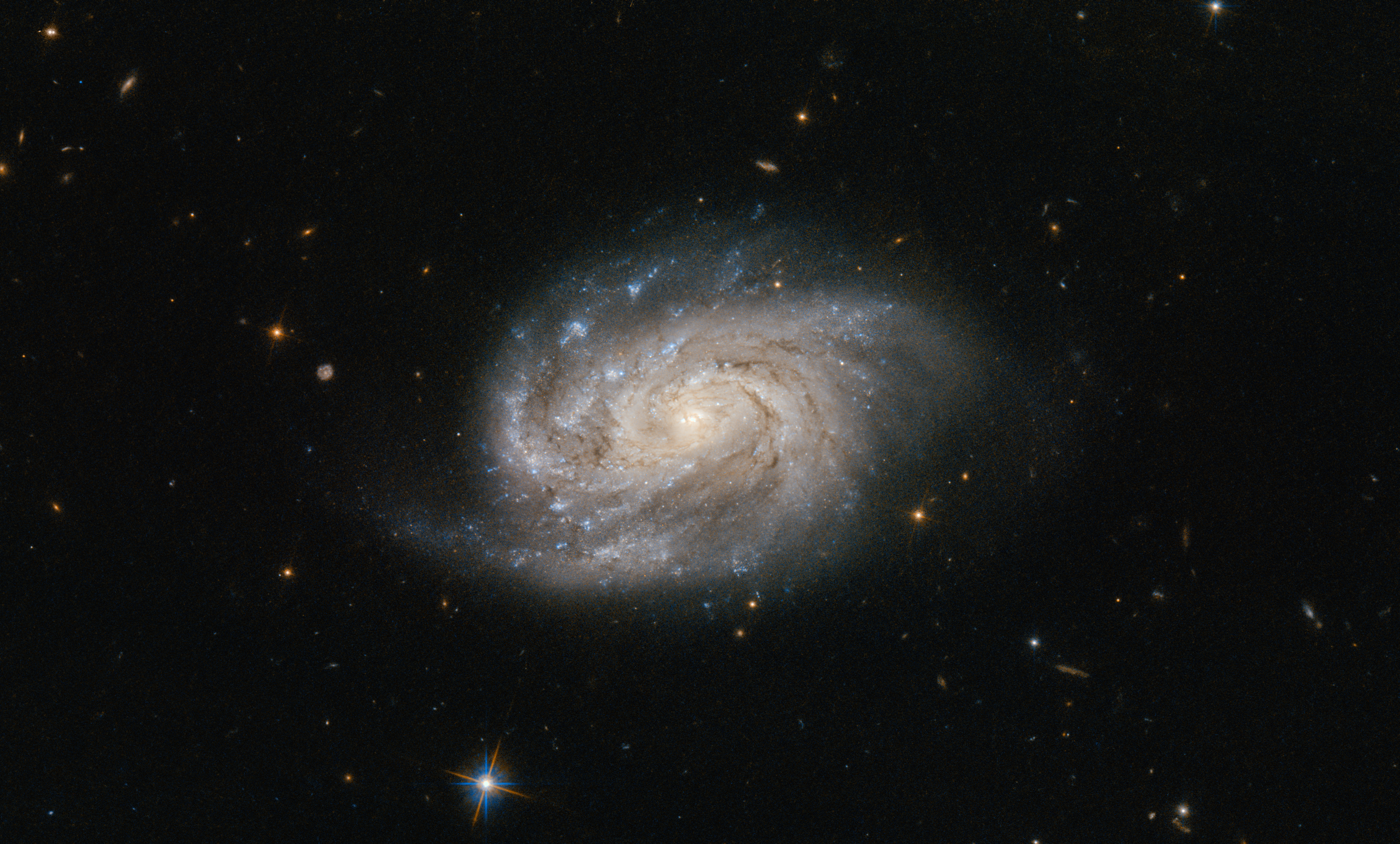
- A Hubble Space Telescope (HST) image of NGC 1803

Observation data (J2000 epoch)
- Constellation: Pictor
- Right ascension: 05^{h} 05^{m} 26.50^{s}
- Declination: −49° 34′ 03.0″
- Redshift: 0.013686±0.000127
- Distance: 192 Mly (58.8 Mpc)
- Apparent magnitude (V): 12.6

Characteristics
- Type: SB(s)bc:
- Size: 87,000 ly
- Apparent size (V): 1.1 x 0.67

Other designations
- APMBGC 203-035-024, 6dFGS gJ050526.6-493403, ESO 203-18, ESO-LV 203-0180, IRAS 05041-4938, IRAS F05041-4938, ISOSS J05054-4933, LEDA 16715, PSCz Q05041-4938, RR95 103a, SGC 050409-4938.0, [SDD95] 259a, [SLK2000] 26, [SLK2004] 473

NGC 1803 is a barred spiral galaxy located around 192 million light-years away in the constellation Pictor. NGC 1803 was discovered in 1834 by John Herschel, and it is 87,000 light-years across.

== See also ==
- Galaxy
