= NGC 2008 =

Spiral galaxy in the constellation Pictor

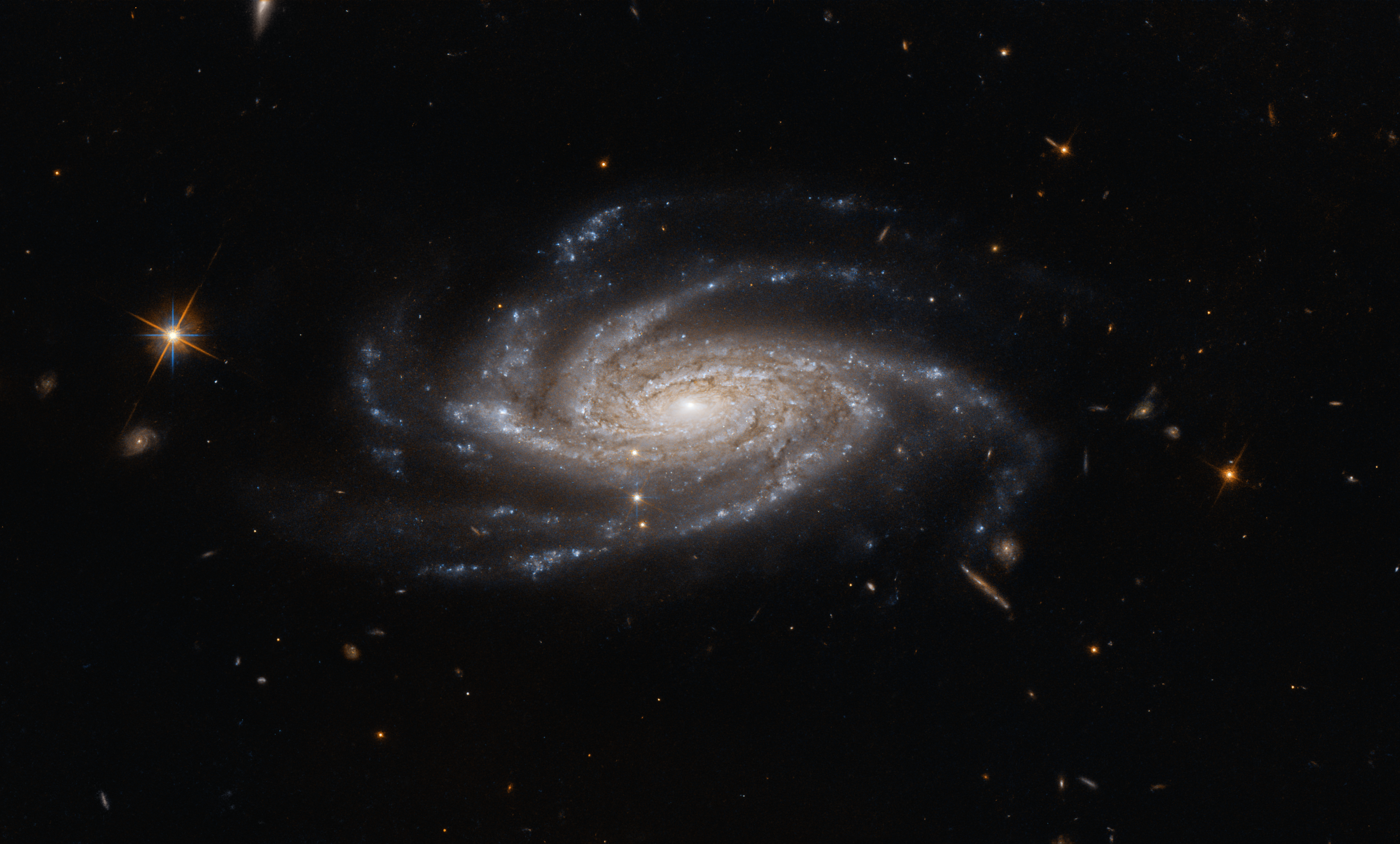
- NGC 2008 imaged by the Hubble Space Telescope

Observation data (J2000 epoch)
- Constellation: Pictor
- Right ascension: 05h 35m 03s
- Declination: -50° 58′ 00″
- Redshift: 0.034387
- Heliocentric radial velocity: 10,309 km/s
- Distance: 499 Mly (152.91 Mpc)
- Apparent magnitude (B): 14.64
- Surface brightness: 23.27 mag/arcsec2

Characteristics
- Type: Sc
- Size: 225,000 ly (estimated 68.91 kpc)
- Apparent size (V): 1.5' x 0.7'

Other designations
- PGC 17480, ESO 204-20, AM 0533-505

NGC 2008 is a distant spiral galaxy located in the constellation Pictor. Its speed relative to the cosmic microwave background is 10,367 ± 11 km/s, which corresponds to a Hubble distance of 153 ± 11 Mpc (~499 million ly). NGC 2008 was discovered by British astronomer John Herschel in 1834. The luminosity class of NGC 2008 is III with an apparent magnitude of 13.2.

NGC 2008 is classified as a type Sc galaxy with a small central budge structure and open spiral arms.

To date, four non-redshift measurements yield a distance of 135.750 ± 10.521 Mpc (~443 million ly), which is within the Hubble distance range. Note, however, that it is with the average value of independent measurements, when they exist, that the NASA/IPAC database calculates the diameter of a galaxy and that consequently the diameter of NGC 2008 could be approximately 77 kpc (~253,000 ly) if we used the Hubble distance to calculate it.

According to Soares and his colleagues, NGC 2007 and NGC 2008 form a pair of galaxies. However, the Hubble distance of NGC 2007 is 67.57 ± 4.73 Mpc (~220 million ly). These two galaxies therefore form a purely optical pair.

== See also ==
- List of NGC objects (2001–3000)
- New General Catalogue
