= PKS 0537−441 =

Blazar in the constellation Pictor

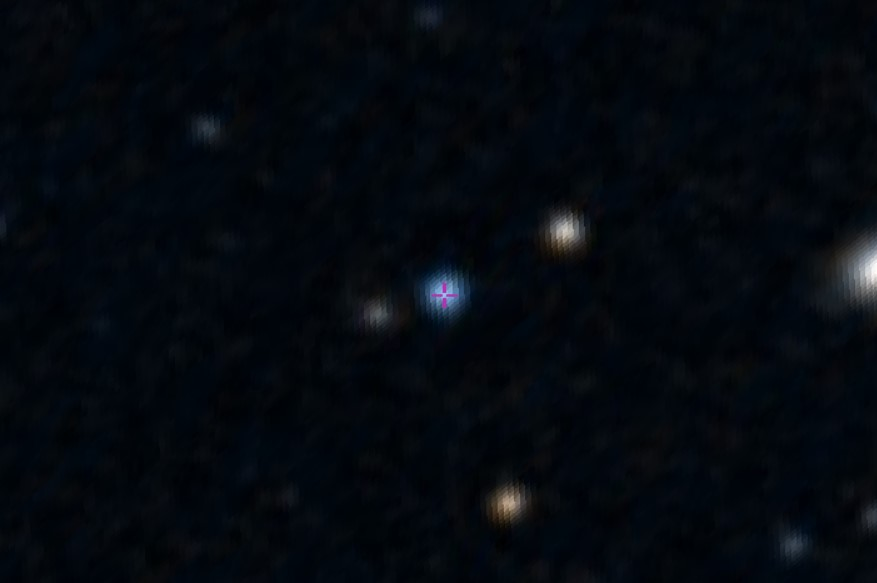
- The blazar PKS 0537−441

Observation data (J2000.0 epoch)
- Constellation: Pictor
- Right ascension: 05^{h} 38^{m} 50.361^{s}
- Declination: −44° 05′ 08.939″
- Redshift: 0.896000
- Heliocentric radial velocity: 268,614 km/s
- Distance: 7.335 Gly
- Apparent magnitude (V): 16.48
- Apparent magnitude (B): 15.77

Characteristics
- Type: Blazar, BL Lac

Other designations
- LEDA 2824444, IRAS F05373−4406, WMAP 148, 4FGL J0538.8−4405, 2E 1488, Cul 0537−441

PKS 0537−441 is a blazar located in the constellation of Pictor. It has a redshift of 0.896 and was discovered in 1973 by an American astronomer named Olin J. Eggen, who noted it as a luminous quasar. This is a BL Lacertae object in literature because of its featureless optical spectra as well as both a possible gravitational microlensing and a gravitationally lensed candidate. Its radio source is found compact and is characterized by a spectral peak in the gigahertz range, making it a gigahertz-peaked spectrum source (GPS).

== Description ==
PKS 0537−441 is found violently variable on the electromagnetic spectrum at all frequencies, and is a source of gamma ray emission. Between December 2004 and March 2005, it underwent intense activity showing more than 4 magnitudes in a V filter in 50 days and 2.5 in 10 days. PKS 0537−441 is also known to display two flaring episodes, one in July 2009 and one in March 2010, with its gamma ray luminosity in the 0.1-100 GeV energy range reaching a peak value (2.6 × 10^{48} erg s^{−1}) on 3-d timescales at the end of the month. During its variability, PKS 0537−441 shows signs of both flux and color index variability on timescales.

PKS 0537−441 contains a radio structure. The source is found to be core dominated on arcsecond scales with a secondary bright component separated by 7".2 at a 305° positional angle (PA). However, according to 2.3 GHz observations conducted by the Southern Hemisphere VLBI Experimental program (SHEVE), the radio structure has a 4.2 Jansky core with a measured diameter of 1.1 mas. There is a jetlike component, confirmed to be an asymmetric core-jet structure according to a 5 GHz Very-long-baseline interferometry imaging. This component is located north of the compact core.

PKS 0537−441 shows gamma ray and optical oscillations. During its high state between August 2008 and 2011, the periodogram of its gamma ray light curve displays a peak reaching T_{0} ~ 280 days with significance of 99.7%. A broad magnesium ionized emission line was also discovered at redshift (z) 0.885, implied to be a mini low ionization broad absorption-line quasar. This speculates PKS 0537−441 might be a binary quasar.
