= NGC 1995 =

Double star in the constellation Pictor

Observation data Epoch J2000.0 Equinox ICRS
- Constellation: Pictor
- Right ascension: 05^{h} 33^{m} 15.7^{s}
- Declination: −48° 41′ 44″

Other designations
- 2MASS J05330310-4840295, PGC 3325910 GC 1198, h 2879

NGC 1995 (also known as PGC 3325910) is a double star located in the constellation Pictor. It was discovered by John Herschel on December 28, 1834. Its size is 0.78 arc minutes. In some sources, such as VizieR, NGC 1995 is misidentified as the nearby lenticular galaxy NGC 1998.
