= Nu Pictoris =

Star in the constellation Pictor

ν Pictoris
- Location of ν Pictoris (circled)

Observation data Epoch J2000 Equinox ICRS
- Constellation: Pictor
- Right ascension: 06^{h} 22^{m} 55.82671^{s}
- Declination: −56° 22′ 11.8909″
- Apparent magnitude (V): 5.60

Characteristics
- Spectral type: A1mA3-A9 + KV
- U−B color index: 0.12
- B−V color index: 0.26

Astrometry
Radial velocity (R_{v})	+6.7±2.9 km/s
Proper motion (μ)	RA: −39.96 mas/yr Dec.: −20.13 mas/yr
Parallax (π)	20±1 mas
Distance	163 ± 8 ly (50 ± 3 pc)
Absolute magnitude (M_{V})	+2.18

Orbit
Period (P)	452+13 −16 d
Semi-major axis (a)	0.0312" (1.56 au)
Eccentricity (e)	0.20+0.35 −0.19
Inclination (i)	116+12 −10°
Longitude of the node (Ω)	53+166 −16°
Periastron epoch (T)	2448660
Argument of periastron (ω) (secondary)	109±53°

Details

A
Mass	1.7 M_{☉}
Radius	1.85 R_{☉}
Luminosity	15.4±0.4 L_{☉}
Surface gravity (log g)	3.97 cgs
Temperature	7,700 K
Metallicity [Fe/H]	−0.03 dex
Rotation	2.21 days
Rotational velocity (v sin i)	42.8 km/s
Age	800 Myr

B
Mass	0.8 M_{☉}
Radius	0.72 R_{☉}
Temperature	4,800 K
Age	800 Myr

Other designations
- ν Pic, CPD−56°1072, GC 8274, HD 45229, HIP 30342, HR 2320, SAO 234473, TYC 8542-1469-1

Database references
SIMBAD	data

ν Pictoris, Latinized as Nu Pictoris, is a binary star system in the southern constellation Pictor. It is visible to the naked eye as a dim point of light with an apparent visual magnitude of 5.60. The system is located around 163 light years from the Sun based on parallax, and is drifting further away with a radial velocity of +7 km/s.

== Characteristics ==
=== Binarity ===
Hipparcos satellite astrometry showed that ν Pictoris moved in a way that was not consistent with the proper motion and annual parallax of a single star. The unusual measurements were not readily identifiable as being due to orbital motion, and it was referred to as having a stochastic solution to its astrometry. Later analysis derived an orbit, although nothing was known about the companion except its approximate mass and motion about the visible star.

The companion was directly detected in 2026 using interferometric data taken in 2024 by the GRAVITY instrument aboard the Very Large Telescope, revealing it to be a K-type main-sequence star. The projected separation of 0.17 au is much smaller than the orbital semi-major axis, which could suggest that the projected separation is much smaller than the actual separation, a possibility further supported by the nearly edge-on orientation of the orbit. A more exotic hypothesis is that Nu Pictoris is a triple system, on which the companion responsible for the astrometric anomalies is, in fact, a third undetected star, either a white dwarf or red dwarf.

The pair orbit each other with a period of 452 days, a semi-major axis of 1.56 au, and an eccentricity of 0.2.

=== Physical characteristics ===
The primary, component A, is a metal-lined Am star with a stellar classification of A1mA3-A9. It has 1.7 times the Sun's mass, 1.85 times the radius of the Sun and is radiating 15 times the Sun's luminosity from its photosphere at an effective temperature of 7,700 K. The secondary, component B, has 0.8 times the Sun's mass, 0.72 times the Sun's radius, and a temperature of 4,800 K. The system is a source for X-ray emission and exhibits stellar flares, both of which are coming from the companion.
