= HR 2562 =

Star in the constellation Pictor

- Location of HR 2562 (circled in red)

Observation data Epoch J2000.0 Equinox J2000.0
- Constellation: Pictor
- Right ascension: 06^{h} 50^{m} 01.0151^{s}
- Declination: −60° 14′ 56.921″
- Apparent magnitude (V): 6.11

Characteristics
- Evolutionary stage: main sequence
- Spectral type: F5VFe+0.4
- B−V color index: +0.457

Astrometry
Radial velocity (R_{v})	−2.06±0.13 km/s
Proper motion (μ)	RA: +4.830 mas/yr Dec.: +108.527 mas/yr
Parallax (π)	29.4738±0.0185 mas
Distance	110.66 ± 0.07 ly (33.93 ± 0.02 pc)
Absolute magnitude (M_{V})	+3.48

Details
Mass	1.368±0.018 M_{☉}
Radius	1.334±0.027 R_{☉}
Luminosity	3.36 L_{☉}
Surface gravity (log g)	4.3±0.2 cgs
Temperature	6,597±81 K
Metallicity [Fe/H]	+0.10±0.06 dex
Rotation	1.78 days
Rotational velocity (v sin i)	42.8 km/s
Age	450+300 −250 Myr

Other designations
- CD−60 1582, HD 50571, HIP 32775, HR 2562, SAO 249654, TOI-6902, TIC 167656187

Database references
SIMBAD	data
Exoplanet Archive	data

HR 2562 is a star in the southern constellation of Pictor. Although visible to the naked eye, it is a challenge to view having an apparent visual magnitude of 6.11. The star is located at a distance of 111 light-years from the Sun based on parallax, but it is drifting closer with a radial velocity of −2 km/s. It has an absolute magnitude of +3.48.

== Characteristics ==
The spectrum of HR 2562 matches a stellar classification of F5VFe+0.4, which indicates that it is an F-type main-sequence star with an iron overabundance. It has a mass 1.37 times that of the Sun and a radius 1.33 times solar. It is radiating 3.36 times the Sun's luminosity from its photosphere at an effective temperature of 6,597±81 K. HR 2562 is not known to belong to a moving group or stellar cluster.

As with many mid F-type stars, the age of HR 2562 is poorly constrained. Between 1999 and 2011, estimates from various teams of astronomers determined ages ranging from roughly 300 Myr to 1.6 Gyr. In 2018, a team of astronomers led by D. Mesa derived an age of 450+300
−250 Myr using measurements of the star's lithium-temperature relationship.

== Planetary system ==
Image of the disk around HR 2562 with the REASONS survey

The IRAS satellite has found that HR 2562 displays an infrared excess, indicating that it is surrounded by a debris disk. The disk was reported in 2006 and confirmed with observations from the MIPS instrument aboard the Spitzer Space Telescope. Observations with the Herschel Telescope have resolved the disk, finding that it extends from 40 to 190 astronomical units and has an inclination of 78°.

A substellar companion, HR 2562 B, was discovered in 2016. This companion has an orbital period of roughly 70 years and is separated by 22.2 astronomical units from the primary. With a mass less than 22 M_{J}, it lies close to the boundary between planets and brown dwarfs. HR 2562 B has drawn interest for its potential dynamical interactions with the outer circumstellar disc.

Any additional companions around HR 2562 with a mass on the order of 10 M_{J} should be visible at separations larger than 10 AU, and any companion a few times more massive than Jupiter should be visible to SPHERE's infrared dual-band spectrograph (IRDIS) instrument—thus placing mass restrictions on any additional companions.

Evidence of a candidate transiting planet has been found by TESS, designated TOI-6902.01. If real, this object would have an orbital period of 36.4 days and a radius 2.9 times that of Earth.

The HR 2562 planetary system
Companion (in order from star)	Mass	Semimajor axis (AU)	Orbital period (years)	Eccentricity	Inclination (°)	Radius
c (unconfirmed)	—	—	36.43586±0.00003	—	—	0.256±0.015 R_{J}
B	≤ 22 M_{J}	22.2+3.8 −2.9	71.5+35.7 −23.2	0.34+0.23 −0.18	86.7+0.5 −0.7	0.89+0.14 −0.27 R_{J}
circumstellar disc	190±20 AU				>80°	—
