= Pictor A =

Galaxy in the constellation of Pictor

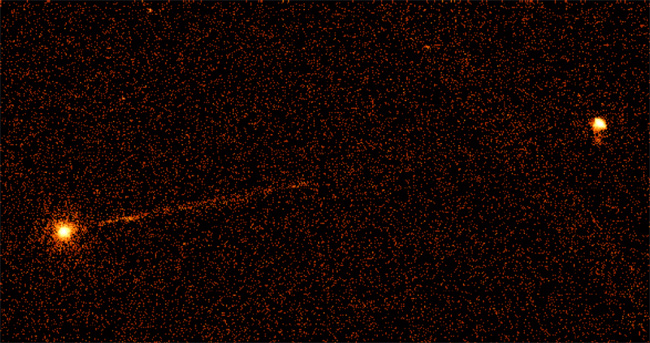
- Image from Chandra X-ray Observatory showing a jet of plasma emanating from Pictor A

Observation data (J2000 epoch)
- Constellation: Pictor
- Right ascension: 05^{h} 19^{m} 49.721^{s}
- Declination: −45° 46′ 43.85″
- Redshift: 0.03498±0.00005
- Heliocentric radial velocity: 10,495±42 km/s
- Galactocentric velocity: 10,308±43 km/s
- Distance: 506.2 ± 35.55 Mly (155.2 ± 10.9 Mpc)h^{−1}_{0.6774} (Comoving); 495 Mly (151.8 Mpc)h^{−1}_{0.6774} (Light-travel)
- Apparent magnitude (V): 15.77
- Apparent magnitude (B): 16.64
- Absolute magnitude (V): 19.2

Characteristics
- Type: S0^{0}
- Size: 319,760 ly × 271,790 ly (98.04 kpc × 83.33 kpc) (diameter; 2MASS K-band total isophote) (Note: The quoted diameter in this infobox was based on NED's provided scale "Virgo + GA + Shapley" of 752 pc/arcsec multiplied with given angular diameters.); 95,690 ly × 66,990 ly (29.34 kpc × 20.54 kpc) (diameter; "total" magnitude)
- Apparent size (V): 0.49′ × 0.34′

Other designations
- Pic A, PKS 0518-45, 2CXO J051949.7-454643

Pictor A is a double-lobed broad-line radio galaxy around 155.2 megaparsecs (506 million light-years) away in the constellation Pictor, and a powerful source of radio waves in the Southern Celestial Hemisphere. From a supermassive black hole at its centre, a relativistic jet shoots out to an X-ray hot spot 300,000 light-years away.
