= AE Pictoris =

Star in the constellation Pictor

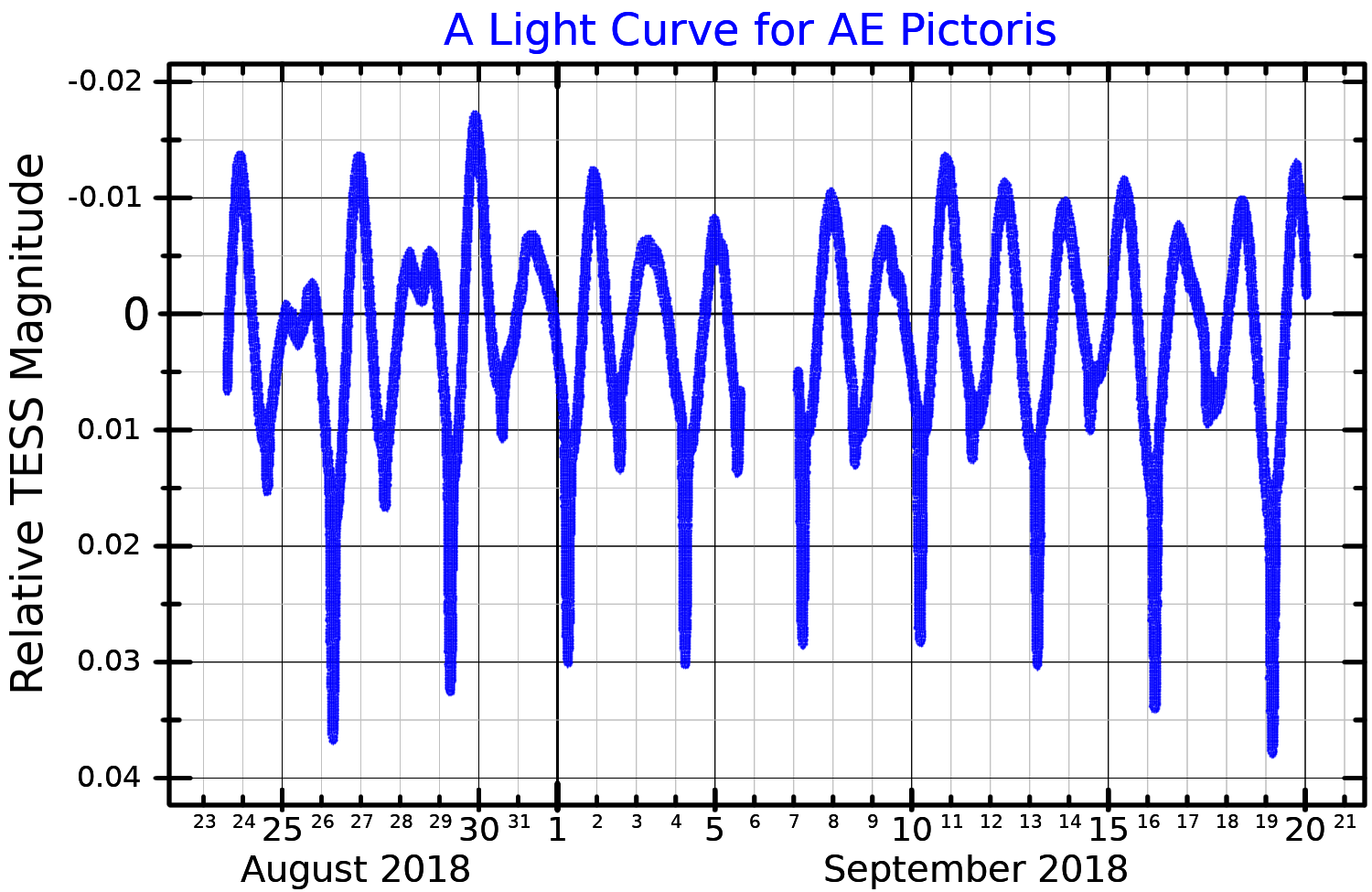
- A light curve for AE Pictoris, adapted from Pedersen et al. (2019)

Observation data Epoch J2000 Equinox ICRS
- Constellation: Pictor
- Right ascension: 06^{h} 31^{m} 10.63900^{s}
- Declination: −61° 52′ 46.3515″
- Apparent magnitude (V): 6.14

Characteristics
- Spectral type: B3V
- B−V color index: −0.147±0.006
- Variable type: Eclipsing binary

Astrometry
Radial velocity (R_{v})	34.0±7.4 km/s
Proper motion (μ)	RA: −9.142 mas/yr Dec.: +12.087 mas/yr
Parallax (π)	2.2770±0.0678 mas
Distance	1,430 ± 40 ly (440 ± 10 pc)
Absolute magnitude (M_{V})	1.73

Orbit
Period (P)	2.9723 d
Eccentricity (e)	0.10
Periastron epoch (T)	2,431,998.871 JD
Argument of periastron (ω) (secondary)	39.0°
Semi-amplitude (K_{1}) (primary)	119.0 km/s

Details

AE Pic A
Mass	7.1±0.1 M_{☉}
Luminosity (bolometric)	2,569 L_{☉}
Temperature	17,873 K
Metallicity [Fe/H]	3.93 dex
Rotation	1.490911 d
Rotational velocity (v sin i)	70 km/s
Age	27.7±1.4 Myr

AE Pic B
Temperature	11,699 K
Metallicity [Fe/H]	4.02 dex
Rotational velocity (v sin i)	42 km/s

Other designations
- AE Pic, CD−61°1394, HD 46792, HIP 31068, HR 2410, SAO 249572

Database references
SIMBAD	data

AE Pictoris is an eclipsing binary star system in the southern constellation of Pictor. This dim, blue-white hued point of light is just barely visible to the naked eye; it has an apparent visual magnitude of 6.09, which drops to magnitude 6.14 during an eclipse. The system is located around 1,430 light years away from the Sun based on parallax, and it is receding with a radial velocity of 34 km/s.

This is a spectroscopic binary system with an orbital period of 2.97 days and an eccentricity of 0.10. The minimum value of the semimajor axis for the pair is 4.8 Gm (6.9 R_{☉}). The secondary star was only recently (in 2023) detected, making it a double-lined spectroscopic binary. It is classed as a probable eclipsing binary variable (EB:), but with some uncertainty regarding the specific type. This is a candidate runaway star system, having a peculiar velocity of 24.9+4.9
−5.1 km/s relative to its neighbors. The visible component is a B-type main-sequence star with a stellar classification of B3V. it is 28 million years old with seven times the mass of the Sun. The star is radiating 2,569 times the luminosity of the Sun from its photosphere at an effective temperature of 18,700 K.
