= Mu Pictoris =

Variable star in the constellation Pictor

Observation data Epoch J2000.0 Equinox ICRS
- Constellation: Pictor
- μ Pic A
- Right ascension: 06^{h} 31^{m} 58.31011^{s}
- Declination: −58° 45′ 13.8114″
- Apparent magnitude (V): 5.71
- μ Pic B
- Right ascension: 06^{h} 31^{m} 58.06851^{s}
- Declination: −58° 45′ 15.4103″
- Apparent magnitude (V): 9.43

Characteristics
- Spectral type: B9 Ve or B9 IVn + A8 V:p?
- U−B color index: −0.17
- B−V color index: −0.06

Astrometry

μ Pic A
Radial velocity (R_{v})	+0.40±1.00 km/s
Proper motion (μ)	RA: −1.302 mas/yr Dec.: +1.637 mas/yr
Parallax (π)	5.3553±0.0358 mas
Distance	609 ± 4 ly (187 ± 1 pc)
Absolute magnitude (M_{V})	0.20

μ Pic B
Proper motion (μ)	RA: +0.881 mas/yr Dec.: +0.918 mas/yr
Parallax (π)	5.3644±0.0286 mas
Distance	608 ± 3 ly (186.4 ± 1.0 pc)
Absolute magnitude (M_{V})	3.75

Details

μ Pic A
Mass	3.32 M_{☉}
Radius	4.43 R_{☉}
Luminosity	205 L_{☉}
Surface gravity (log g)	3.612 cgs
Temperature	10,375 K
Rotational velocity (v sin i)	228 km/s
Age	258 Myr

μ Pic B
Mass	1.18 M_{☉}
Radius	1.26 R_{☉}
Luminosity	5.23 L_{☉}
Surface gravity (log g)	4.25 cgs
Temperature	7,770 K

Other designations
- μ Pic, CPD−58°722, HD 46860, HIP 31137, HR 2412, SAO 234564

Database references
SIMBAD	μ Pic A
- μ Pic B

μ Pictoris, Latinised as Mu Pictoris, is a binary star system in the southern constellation Pictor. It is bright enough to be dimly visible to the naked eye, having a combined apparent visual magnitude of 5.69. Based upon an annual parallax shift of 5.4 mas as seen from Earth, the system is located roughly 610 light years distant from the Sun. As of 2010, the pair have an angular separation of 2.46 arc seconds along a position angle of 221°.

The primary, designated component A, is a blue-white star with a visual magnitude of 5.71 and a stellar classification of B9 Ve or B9 IVn. The first classification suggests is a B-type main-sequence star, with the 'e' suffix indicating a Be star. The second may instead indicate a somewhat more evolved B-type star that is spinning rapidly, resulting in "nebulous" absorption lines. Photometrically, it shows a pulsation period of 0.397 days, which is likely the same as the rotation period.

The secondary companion, component B, is a white-hued star of magnitude 9.43 with a classification of A8 V:p?. This indicates it is an A-type main-sequence star, with the 'p?' suffix suggesting it may be chemically peculiar while the ':' notation says there is some uncertainty about the general classification. The star has a radius of 1.26 R_{☉} and a luminosity around 5.2 L_{☉}, values unusually low compared to the average for an A8-type dwarf star.
