= Theta Pictoris =

Star in the constellation Pictor

Observation data Epoch J2000.0 Equinox ICRS
- Constellation: Pictor
- θ Pic AB
- Right ascension: 05^{h} 24^{m} 46.28819^{s}
- Declination: −52° 18′ 58.4836″
- Apparent magnitude (V): 6.26
- θ Pic C
- Right ascension: 05^{h} 24^{m} 42.32511^{s}
- Declination: −52° 18′ 46.9457″
- Apparent magnitude (V): 6.79

Characteristics

θ Pic AB
- Spectral type: A0V (A1III + Am)
- B−V color index: 0.067±0.004

θ Pic C
- Spectral type: A2V

Astrometry

θ Pic AB
Radial velocity (R_{v})	−3.1±0.8 km/s
Proper motion (μ)	RA: −4.00 mas/yr Dec.: −27.71 mas/yr
Parallax (π)	6.36±0.32 mas
Distance	510 ± 30 ly (157 ± 8 pc)
Absolute magnitude (M_{V})	+0.28

θ Pic C
Radial velocity (R_{v})	−8.20±3.7 km/s
Proper motion (μ)	RA: −5.411 mas/yr Dec.: −27.743 mas/yr
Parallax (π)	6.3027±0.0322 mas
Distance	517 ± 3 ly (158.7 ± 0.8 pc)
Absolute magnitude (M_{V})	+0.99

Details

θ Pic AB
Luminosity	68.0 L_{☉}

θ Pic C
Mass	2.647^{+0.129}_{−0.130} M_{☉}
Radius	2.69^{+0.99}_{−0.20} R_{☉}
Luminosity	69.6^{+9.0}_{−8.0} L_{☉}
Surface gravity (log g)	3.96^{+0.18}_{−0.09} cgs
Temperature	10,085^{+790}_{−202} K
Metallicity [Fe/H]	-0.18±0.08 dex
Age	340^{+70}_{−40} Myr

Other designations
- θ Pic AB: θ Pic, CD−52°1198, HD 35860, HIP 25303, HR 1818, SAO 233965, WDS J05248-5219AB
- θ Pic C: CPD−52°717, HD 35859, HIP 25298, HR 1818, SAO 233964, WDS J05248-5219C

Database references

θ Pic AB
SIMBAD	data

θ Pic C
SIMBAD	data

Theta Pictoris (θ Pic) is a star in the constellation Pictor].

The Theta Pictoris system consists of a total of four stars. Theta Pictoris C (HD 35859), an A2V star of about 6.77 magnitude, can be distinguished visually with a small telescope from the main system Theta Pictoris AB; its angular separation from AB is 38.3 arc seconds. Theta Pictoris AB, in turn, consists of a magnitude 6.76 A0V star and a magnitude 7.40 star separated by 0.287" with an orbital period of 123.2 years and eccentricity of 0.692. One of them is also an unresolved spectroscopic binary.
