= Iota Pictoris =

Star in the constellation Pictor

Observation data Epoch J2000.0 Equinox ICRS
- Constellation: Pictor
- ι Pic A
- Right ascension: 04^{h} 50^{m} 55.32684^{s}
- Declination: −53° 27′ 41.2300″
- Apparent magnitude (V): 5.63
- ι Pic B
- Right ascension: 04^{h} 50^{m} 56.49825^{s}
- Declination: −53° 27′ 34.9159″
- Apparent magnitude (V): 6.47

Characteristics

ι Pic A
- Spectral type: F0 V
- U−B color index: 0.06
- B−V color index: 0.32

ι Pic B
- Spectral type: F4 V
- B−V color index: 0.37

Astrometry

ι Pic A
Radial velocity (R_{v})	8.6±3.4 km/s
Proper motion (μ)	RA: −98.707 mas/yr Dec.: +80.769 mas/yr
Parallax (π)	24.9211±0.1559 mas
Distance	130.9 ± 0.8 ly (40.1 ± 0.3 pc)
Absolute magnitude (M_{V})	2.50

ι Pic B
Radial velocity (R_{v})	23.3±1.0 km/s
Proper motion (μ)	RA: −98.707 mas/yr Dec.: +66.139 mas/yr
Parallax (π)	25.6610±0.4106 mas
Distance	127 ± 2 ly (39.0 ± 0.6 pc)
Absolute magnitude (M_{V})	3.30

Details

ι Pic A
Mass	1.51 M_{☉}
Radius	1.80+0.23 −0.11 R_{☉}
Luminosity	7.2±0.1 L_{☉}
Surface gravity (log g)	4.28±0.14 cgs
Temperature	7,331±249 K
Age	696 Myr

ι Pic B
Mass	2.76 M_{☉}
Radius	1.48+0.04 −0.06 R_{☉}
Luminosity	3.4±0.06 L_{☉}
Surface gravity (log g)	4.24±0.14 cgs
Temperature	6,435±219 K
Age	516 Myr

Other designations
- ι Pic, CPD−53°760, WDS J04509-5328AB
- ι Pic A: HD 31203, HIP 22531, HR 1563, SAO 233709
- ι Pic B: HD 31204, HIP 22534, HR 1564, SAO 233710

Database references
SIMBAD	data

ι Pictoris, Latinized from Iota Pictoris, is a suspected multiple star system in the southern constellation Pictor. It is visible to the naked eye as a dim, yellow-white-hued point of light with a combined apparent visual magnitude of 5.28. The two resolvable components have an angular separation of 8.2 arcseconds, equivalent to a physical projected separation of around 450 AU. They are located at a distance of around 127–131 light-years from the Sun, based on parallax.

The two visible components appear as F-type main-sequence stars: the magnitude 5.63 component A has a stellar classification of F0 V, while the cooler, fainter secondary is of class F4 V. Both are themselves are suspected spectroscopic binary stars consisting of roughly equal components. Component B actually has a higher estimated mass than Component A, although the radius of B is smaller. They are both more luminous than the Sun, and have an estimated age of around 500–600 million years.
