= Lambda Pictoris =

Star in the constellation Pictor

Observation data Epoch J2000.0 Equinox J2000.0 (ICRS)
- Constellation: Pictor
- Right ascension: 04^{h} 42^{m} 46.42350^{s}
- Declination: −50° 28′ 52.8050″
- Apparent magnitude (V): +5.29

Characteristics
- Spectral type: K0/1 III
- U−B color index: +0.74
- B−V color index: +0.98

Astrometry
| Radial velocity (R_{v}) | +4.60 km/s |
| Proper motion (μ) | RA: −36.02 mas/yr Dec.: mas/yr |
| Parallax (π) | 8.71±0.18 mas |
| Distance | 374 ± 8 ly (115 ± 2 pc) |

Details
| Mass | 2.20 M_{☉} |
| Luminosity | 112 L_{☉} |
| Surface gravity (log g) | 2.77±0.09 cgs |
| Temperature | 4,851±45 K |
| Metallicity [Fe/H] | −0.13±0.03 dex |
| Age | 2.24 Gyr |

Other designations
- λ Pic, CD−50°1471, FK5 2351, HD 30185, HIP 21914, HR 1516, SAO 233638

Database references
| SIMBAD | data |

λ Pictoris, Latinised as Lambda Pictoris, is a solitary, orange-hued star in the southern constellation of Pictor. It is visible to the naked eye, having an apparent visual magnitude of +5.29. With an annual parallax shift of 8.71 mas as seen from the Earth, it is located around 374 light-years from the Sun. At the estimated age of 2.24 billion years old, it is an evolved K-type giant star with a stellar classification of K0/1 III. Lambda Pictoris has 2.2 times the mass of the Sun and is radiating 112 times the Sun's luminosity from its photosphere at an effective temperature of 4,581 K.
