= HD 41248 =

Star in the constellation Pictor

Observation data Epoch J2000.0 Equinox ICRS
- Constellation: Pictor
- Right ascension: 06^{h} 00^{m} 32.78139^{s}
- Declination: −56° 09′ 42.5972″
- Apparent magnitude (V): 8.81

Characteristics
- Evolutionary stage: main sequence
- Spectral type: G1V

Astrometry
Proper motion (μ)	RA: +126.043 mas/yr Dec.: +59.134 mas/yr
Parallax (π)	18.1141±0.0123 mas
Distance	180.1 ± 0.1 ly (55.21 ± 0.04 pc)
Absolute magnitude (M_{V})	+5.23

Details
Mass	0.94±0.02 M_{☉}
Radius	0.92±0.06 R_{☉}
Luminosity	0.70 L_{☉}
Surface gravity (log g)	4.49±0.05 cgs
Temperature	5,713±21 K
Metallicity [Fe/H]	−0.37±0.05 dex
Rotation	26.4±1.1 d
Rotational velocity (v sin i)	1.0 km/s

Other designations
- CD−56°1377, HIP 28460, SAO 234250

Database references
SIMBAD	data

HD 41248 is a star in the constellation Pictor. It is a star very similar to the Sun, with the same spectral type (G2V). It has 68% of the Sun's luminosity, 92% of its mass and 78% of its diameter. It is estimated to be around 2 billion years old, and it has a lower metallicity—43% that of the Sun. With an apparent visual magnitude of 8.81, it is too faint to be seen with the unaided eye, and is located 180 light-years (55 parsecs) away from the Solar System.

HD 41248 was investigated in the High Accuracy Radial Velocity Planet Searcher (HARPS) and initially thought not to have planets, but review of its spectrum showed it to have two super-earths with orbital periods of 18.357 days and 25.648 days and minimum masses 12.3 and 8.6 times that of the Earth. The planets are in a 7:5 mean motion resonance. The existence of the planets has been called into question as being a possible false detection due to stellar activity, with a cycle of 25 days related to the star's rotational period. The original researchers conceded small planet signals could be difficult to unravel from signal noise and noted that the star had become more active in recent years, but in reanalysing all the data concluded that the stability of the radial velocity signals over ten years strengthened the case for the planet hypothesis. They add that more conclusive proof could come as instruments operating in the near infrared such as CARMENES or the Habitable Zone Planet Finder (HPF) become operational. However, a 2026 study concluded that the signal was indeed caused by stellar activity rather than an orbiting planet.
