= AK Pictoris =

Star system in the constellation Pictor

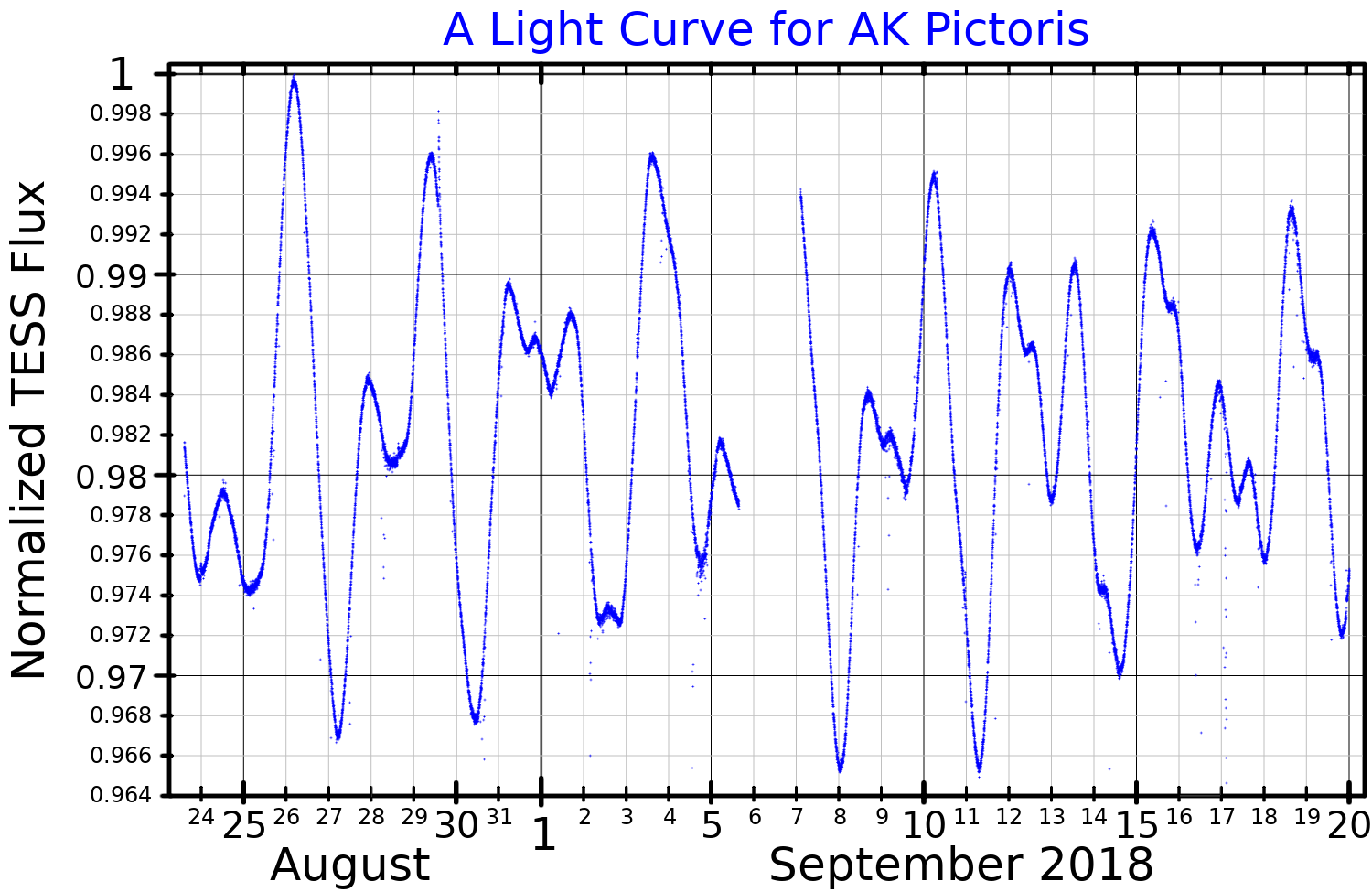
- A light curve for AK Pictoris, plotted from TESS data.

Observation data Epoch J2000 Equinox ICRS
- Constellation: Pictor
- Right ascension: 06^{h} 38^{m} 00.36576^{s}
- Declination: −61° 32′ 00.1941″
- Apparent magnitude (V): 6.182 (6.32 / 8.77)

Characteristics
- Spectral type: G2 + K5:
- B−V color index: +0.62
- Variable type: BY Dra

Astrometry
Radial velocity (R_{v})	32.10 ± 0.5 km/s
Proper motion (μ)	RA: -47.84 mas/yr Dec.: 72.73 mas/yr
Parallax (π)	46.96±0.81 mas
Distance	69 ± 1 ly (21.3 ± 0.4 pc)
Absolute magnitude (M_{V})	4.63 + ?

Orbit
Period (P)	217.6 yr
Semi-major axis (a)	2.004″
Eccentricity (e)	0.336
Inclination (i)	93.9°
Longitude of the node (Ω)	91.6°
Periastron epoch (T)	2033.9
Argument of periastron (ω) (secondary)	357.3°

Details

AK Pic A
Mass	1.03 M_{☉}
Radius	1.22 R_{☉}
Luminosity	1.45 L_{☉}
Temperature	5860 K
Rotational velocity (v sin i)	15.1 ± 0.8 km/s

AK Pic B
Luminosity	0.25 L_{☉}
Temperature	4400 K
Rotational velocity (v sin i)	15.5 ± 2.0 km/s

Other designations
- CD−61° 1428, GJ 3400, HD 48189, HIP 31711, HR 2468, SAO 249604

Database references
SIMBAD	data

AK Pictoris is a star system in the constellation Pictor. Its combined apparent magnitude is 6.182. Based on the system's parallax, it is located 69 light-years (21.3 parsecs) away. AK Pictoris is a member of the AB Doradus moving group, a group of stars with similar motions that are thought to be associated.

AK Pictoris is a binary star. Its two stars orbit each other every 217.6 years, separated by 2.004″. The primary star is a G-type star with similar properties to the Sun. The secondary star is a K-type star. The primary star is a young BY Draconis variable, a class of variable stars that derive their variability from stellar rotation. It is also known to host a debris disk, inferred from its infrared excess.
