= Kappa Pictoris =

Star in the constellation Pictor

Observation data Epoch J2000.0 Equinox J2000.0 (ICRS)
- Constellation: Pictor
- Right ascension: 05^{h} 22^{m} 22.14661^{s}
- Declination: −56° 08′ 03.8409″
- Apparent magnitude (V): +6.11

Characteristics
- Spectral type: B8/9 V
- B−V color index: −0.10

Astrometry
Radial velocity (R_{v})	−5.0±7.4 km/s
Proper motion (μ)	RA: −5.03 mas/yr Dec.: +22.01 mas/yr
Parallax (π)	5.14±0.25 mas
Distance	630 ± 30 ly (195 ± 9 pc)
Absolute magnitude (M_{V})	+0.34

Details
Mass	3.42±0.07 M_{☉}
Luminosity	210 L_{☉}
Temperature	11,641 K
Rotational velocity (v sin i)	264 km/s
Age	256 Myr

Other designations
- κ Pic, CPD−56°840, FK5 2403, HD 35580, HIP 25098, HR 1801, SAO 233952

Database references
SIMBAD	data

κ Pictoris, Latinised as Kappa Pictoris, is a star in the constellation Pictor. It is close to the lower limit of stars that are visible to the naked eye having an apparent visual magnitude of +6.11. Based upon an annual parallax shift of 5.14 mas as seen from Earth, this star is located around 630 light years from the Sun. At that distance, the visual magnitude is diminished by an extinction factor of 0.10 due to interstellar dust.

This is a B-type main sequence star with a stellar classification of B8/9 V. It is about 76.4% of the way through its main sequence lifespan. The star is spinning rapidly with a projected rotational velocity of 264 km/s. It has an estimated 3.4 times the mass of the Sun and is radiating 210 times the Sun's luminosity from its photosphere at an effective temperature of 11,641 K.
