= TW Pictoris =

Star in the constellation Pictor

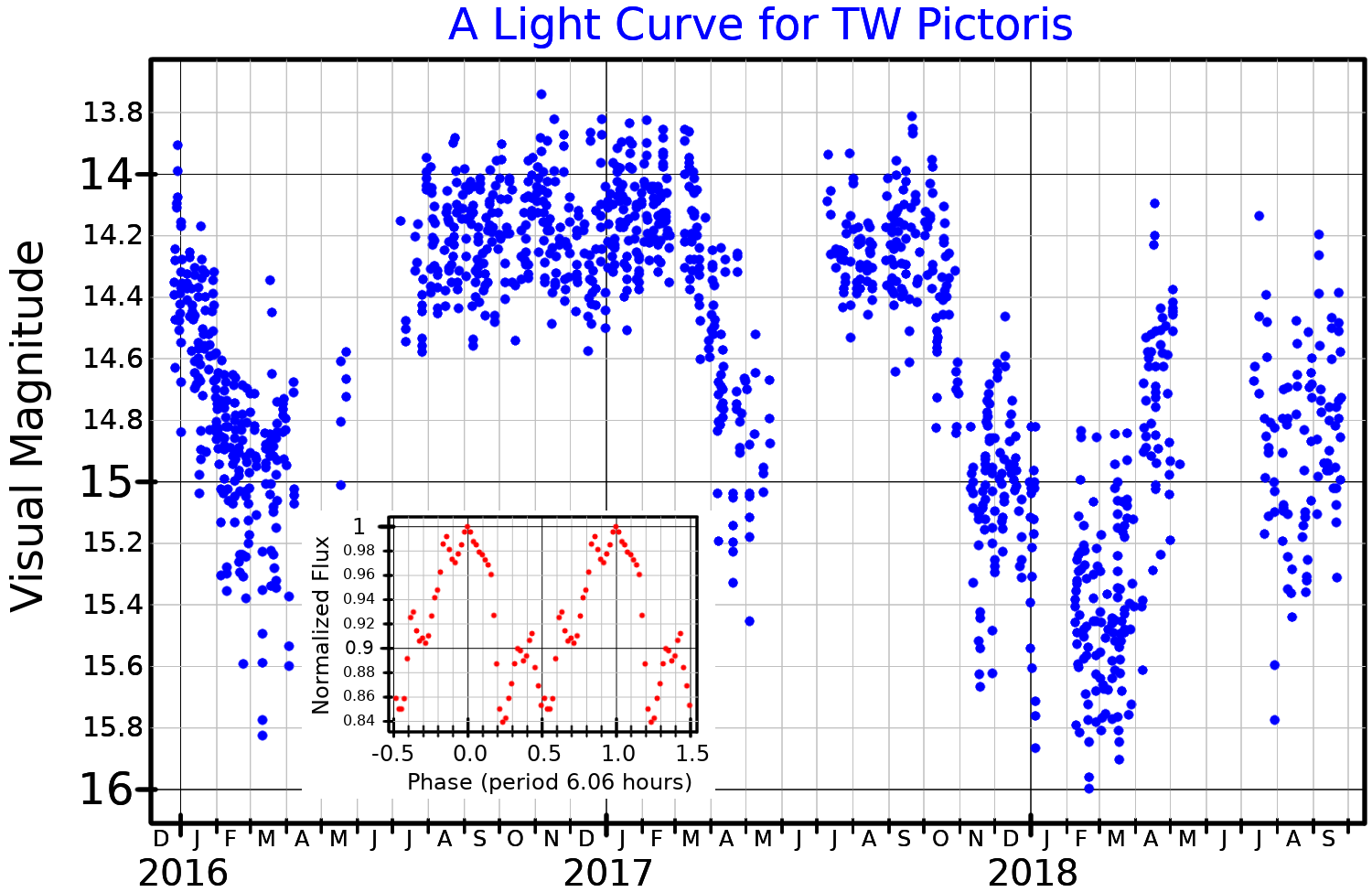
- A light curve for TW Pictoris. The main plot, adapted from Scaringi et al. (2021), shows the long-term visual band variation, and the inset plot, adapted from Patterson and Moulden (1993), shows the periodic variability.

Observation data Epoch J2000 Equinox ICRS
- Constellation: Pictor
- Right ascension: 05^{h} 34^{m} 50.586^{s}
- Declination: −58° 01′ 40.77″
- Apparent magnitude (V): 15.10 (14.1 - 15.6)

Characteristics
- U−B color index: 0.99
- B−V color index: 0.27
- Variable type: Nova-like variable

Astrometry
Proper motion (μ)	RA: −11.632 mas/yr Dec.: 3.745 mas/yr
Parallax (π)	2.2839±0.0223 mas
Distance	1,430 ± 10 ly (438 ± 4 pc)

Other designations
- TW Pic, H0534-581

Database references
SIMBAD	data

TW Pictoris is a 14th magnitude cataclysmic variable star system in the southern constellation of Pictor. It is located at a distance of approximately 1,430 light-years based on parallax measurements. Photometric observations in the visual band suggest a binary system with an orbital period of 6.06 hours. One of the components is an accreting white dwarf.

The X-ray source H0534-581 was identified from the data collected by the HEAO 1 satellite in 1979. In 1984, a candidate optical counterpart was identified by I. R. Tuohy and associates from photographs taken at the Schmidt telescope. A low-resolution spectrum revealed this is a cataclysmic variable, and it was assigned the variable star designation TW Pictoris. It was initially proposed to be an intermediate polar, but the lack of an X-ray pulsation makes this less likely. The current classification remains controversial.
