= HR 2562 B =

Brown dwarf

Discovery
- Discovered by: Q. Konopacky et al.
- Discovery date: 2016
- Detection method: Direct imaging

Orbital characteristics
- Semi-major axis: 22.2+3.8 −2.9 AU
- Eccentricity: 0.34+0.23 −0.18
- Orbital period (sidereal): 71.5+35.7 −23.2 yr
- Inclination: 86.7+0.5 −0.7°
- Longitude of ascending node: 119.5°+0.3° −0.7°
- Argument of periastron: 37°+32° −24°
- Star: HR 2562

Physical characteristics
- Mean radius: 0.92±0.02 R_{J}
- Mass: 14±2, < 22 M_{J}
- Surface gravity: log(g) = 4.59±0.05 m/s^{2}
- Temperature: 1,255+14 −13 K

HR 2562 B is a substellar companion orbiting the star HR 2562. Discovered in 2016 by a team led by Quinn M. Konopacky by direct imaging, HR 2562 B orbits within the inner edge of HR 2562's circumstellar disc—as of April 2023, it is one of only two known brown dwarfs to do so. Separated by roughly 20 astronomical units (3.0×10^{9} km) from its primary companion, HR 2562 B has drawn interest for its potential dynamical interactions with the outer circumstellar disc.

== Discovery ==
HR 2562 B was discovered using the Gemini Planet Imager (GPI), which first observed the star HR 2562 in January 2016. In the initial data set, Konopacky and collaborators identified a candidate companion object. As a result, followup observations were conducted within the following month in the infrared K1-, K2-, and J-bands. Within the processed data set, HR 2562 B was confirmed to share a common proper motion with HR 2562, with Konopacky and collaborators announcing its discovery in a paper published on 14 September 2016.

== Properties ==
=== Orbital properties ===
Initial observations of HR 2562 B by Konopacky and collaborators yielded a separation of 20.3 ± 0.3 AU (3.037×10^{9} ± 45,000,000 km), placing it interior to and coplanar with the inner edge of HR 2562's observed debris disc. Further observations of HR 2562 B by the Atacama Large Millimeter Array (ALMA) supported this, yielding a semi-major axis of 19.0+5.7
−4.4 AU, an orbital period of 71.5+35.7
−23.2 yr, and an orbital eccentricity of 0.63+0.32
−0.23. With a probable orbital inclination of 82.8°+2.0°
−12.5°, HR 2562 B's misalignment angle with the debris disc is either 7°+17°
−4° or 15°+18°
−5°. However, the limited coverage of observations still leaves a wide range of possible orbits; both low-eccentricity, coplanar orbits and high-eccentricity, misaligned orbits would be consistent with observation data. However, a highly misaligned orbit would significantly perturb the disc, suggesting that a low-eccentricity, coplanar solutions are likelier. A 2025 study using astrometry and radial velocity refined the orbital elements, finding a separation of 22.2 AU, a significantly lower eccentricity of 0.34, and an inclination of 86.7°, which implies a planet-disk inclination of 3.7±0.3°.

=== Physical properties ===
HR 2562 B's mass was first estimated in 2016 at 30±15 M_{J}, based on measurements of its luminosity and age compared to the predictions of evolutionary models. This was later revised to 29±15 M_{J} in 2021. However, astrometric observations placed an upper mass limit of 18.5 M_{J} and later 22 M_{J}. Atmospheric modelling of the spectral energy distribution indicates a mass of 14±2 M_{J}, an effective temperature of 1,252 K, and a luminosity of (2.04±0.05)×10^{−5} L_{☉}. The spectral type is L7±3.

== See also ==
- PZ Telescopii B, another substellar object with mass slightly below 30 M_{J}
