= RR Pictoris =

1925 Nova seen in the constellation Pictor

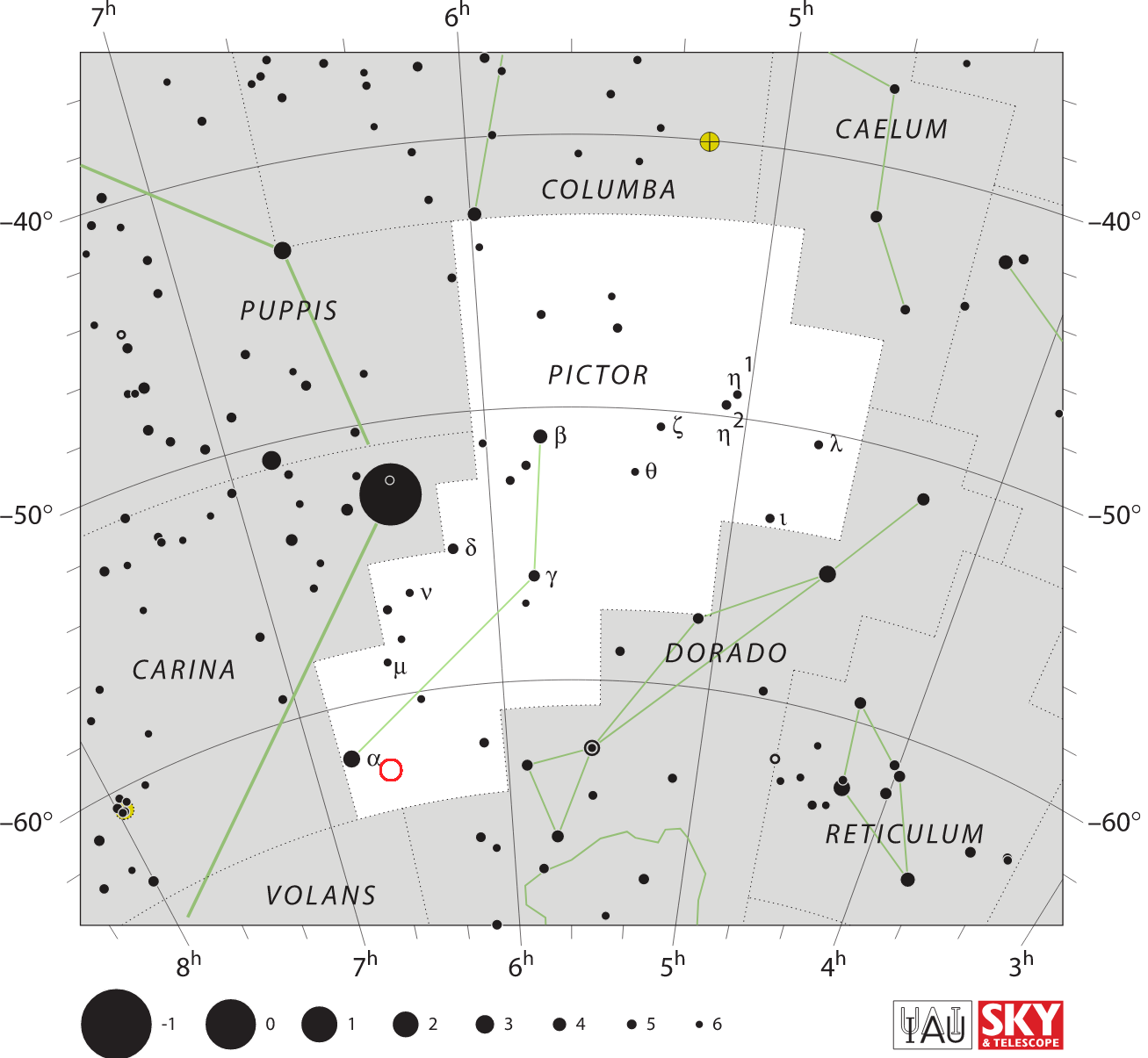
- Location of RR Pictoris (circled in red)

Observation data Epoch J2000.0 Equinox ICRS
- Constellation: Pictor
- Right ascension: 06^{h} 35^{m} 36.063^{s}
- Declination: −62° 38′ 22.29″
- Apparent magnitude (V): 1.2Max. 12.5Min.

Astrometry
Distance	1,670^{+26}_{−26} ly (511+8 −8 pc)

Characteristics
- Variable type: Classical Nova

Other designations
- RR Pic, HIP 31481, TYC 8899-1342-1, Nova Pic 1925, AAVSO 0634-62, Gaia DR2 5477422099543150592

Database references
SIMBAD	data

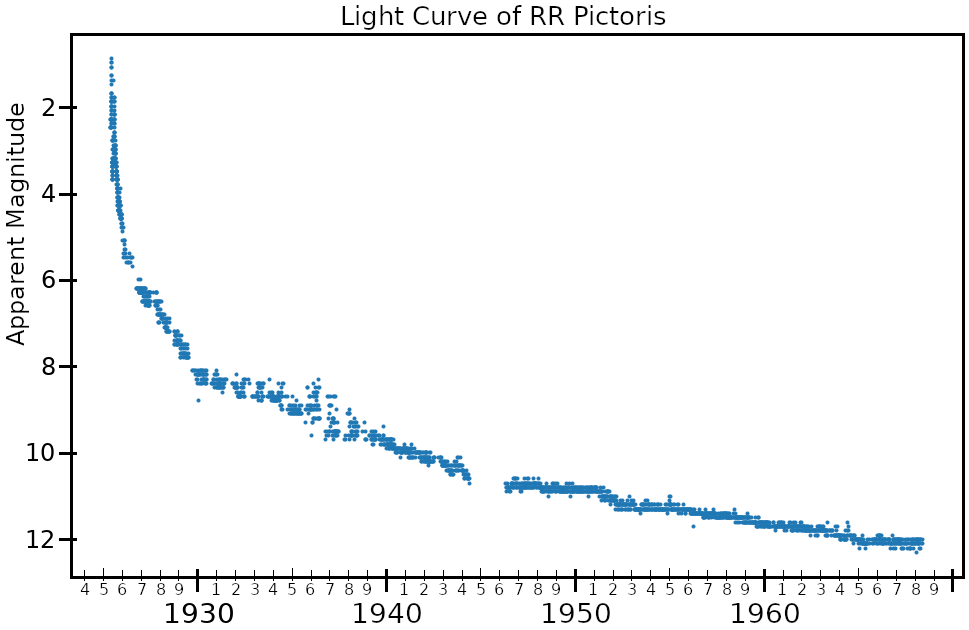
The light curve of RR Pictoris from AAVSO data.

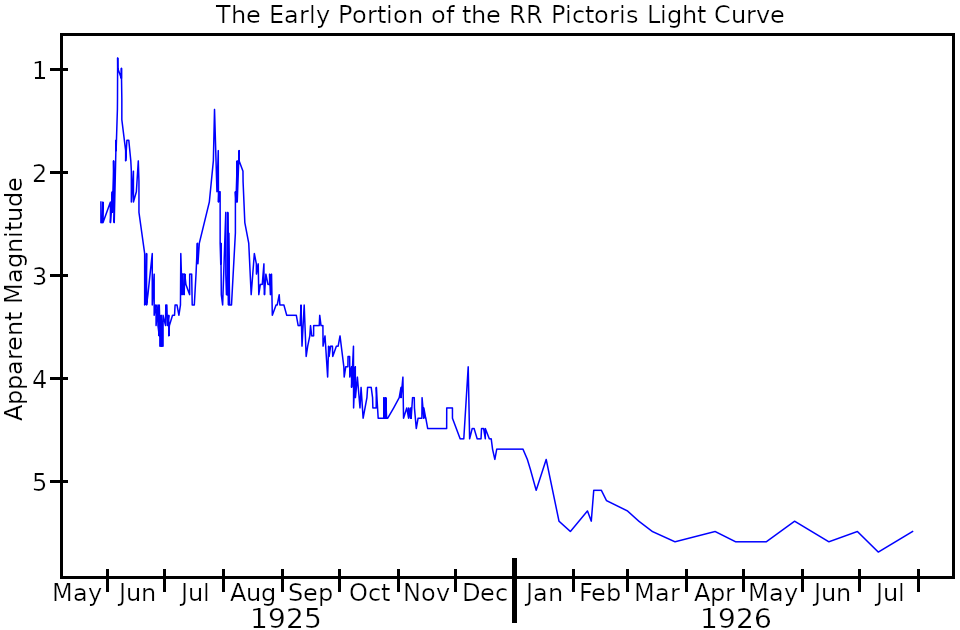
The early portion of the light curve of RR Pictoris, showing the three brightness peaks which were seen shortly after the nova's discovery. Plotted from AAVSO data.

RR Pictoris, also known as Nova Pictoris 1925, is a cataclysmic variable star system that flared up as a nova that lit up in the constellation Pictor in 1925. It was discovered by South African amateur astronomer Robert Watson who lived in Beaufort West. At 05:50 AM on 25 May 1925, Mr. Watson was walking to work and noticed a star that he did not recognize in line with the stars α Crucis and β Carinae. He consulted his copy of Norton's Star Atlas, and realized that the unfamiliar star was a nova. Fortuitously, Mr. Watson was employed as a telegraph operator, and he promptly sent a telegram describing his discovery to the Royal Observatory at Cape Town. This quick reporting of the event allowed southern observatories to obtain spectra of the nova before it had reached maximum brightness.

At the time of its discovery, RR Pictoris had an apparent magnitude of 2.3. It continued to brighten to magnitude 1.2, which it reached on 9 June 1925. It dimmed to magnitude 4 by 4 July, but brightened again to 1.9 on 9 August. Six months after its peak brightness, RR Pictoris faded to be invisible to the unaided eye, and was magnitude 12.5 by 1975. RR Pictoris is classified as a slow nova and its light curve exhibits positive superhumps, meaning superhumps with a period a few percent (8.6% in this case) longer than the star system's orbital period.

Measurements by the Gaia spacecraft show that the RR Pictoris system is around 510 parsecs (1670 light-years) from the Earth.

Novae are close binary systems composed of a white dwarf and secondary star that is so close it is filling up its Roche lobe with stellar material, which is then transferred onto the first star's accretion disc. Once this material reaches a critical mass, it ignites and the system brightens tremendously. The two stars of RR Pictoris orbit each other every 3.48 hours. Calculations of the speed suggest the secondary star is not dense enough for its size to still be on the main sequence, so it itself must have begun expanding and cooling already as its core has run out of hydrogen fuel.

Small variations in the observed orbital period suggest that RR Pictoris system may include a low mass (0.25 M_{☉}) third star orbiting the close binary pair with a period of about 70 years.

A small (< 30 arc second) filamentary nebula surrounds the nova, and comparisons of images taken several years apart have allowed its rate of expansion to be measured.
