= HD 42540 =

Star in the constellation Pictor

- Location of HD 42540 (circled)

Observation data Epoch J2000 Equinox J2000
- Constellation: Pictor
- Right ascension: 06^{h} 07^{m} 03.40671^{s}
- Declination: −62° 09′ 16.4496″
- Apparent magnitude (V): 5.04

Characteristics
- Spectral type: K2-3III
- U−B color index: +1.35
- B−V color index: +1.25
- Variable type: suspected

Astrometry
| Radial velocity (R_{v}) | +21.60 km/s |
| Proper motion (μ) | RA: +15.513 mas/yr Dec.: −70.013 mas/yr |
| Parallax (π) | 8.378±0.0939 mas |
| Distance | 389 ± 4 ly (119 ± 1 pc) |
| Absolute magnitude (M_{V}) | −0.18 |

Details
| Mass | 2.8 M_{☉} |
| Radius | 27 R_{☉} |
| Luminosity | 270 L_{☉} |
| Temperature | 4,530 K |
| Rotational velocity (v sin i) | 1.7 km/s |

Other designations
- μ Dor, CD−62°235, FK5 2469, GC 7825, HIP 28991, HR 2196, HD 42540, NSV 2845, SAO 249451

Database references
| SIMBAD | data |

HD 42540, also known as HR 2196, is a giant star in the constellation Pictor. A class K2-3III orange giant, its apparent magnitude is 5.04 and it is approximately 389 light years away based on parallax.

This star was mistakenly catalogued as Mu Doradus (Mu Dor/μ Doradus/μ Dor) at incorrect coordinates, then assumed to be variable as no 5th-magnitude star was seen at that position. It also has the Gould designation 47 G. Pictoris.
