= Gamma Pictoris =

Star in the constellation Pictor

γ Pictoris
- Location of γ Pictoris (circled)

Observation data Epoch J2000 Equinox ICRS
- Constellation: Pictor
- Right ascension: 05^{h} 49^{m} 49.66006^{s}
- Declination: −56° 09′ 59.9978″
- Apparent magnitude (V): 4.50

Characteristics
- Evolutionary stage: Red clump
- Spectral type: K1 III
- U−B color index: +0.98
- B−V color index: +1.10

Astrometry
Radial velocity (R_{v})	17.29±0.18 km/s
Proper motion (μ)	RA: +82.36 mas/yr Dec.: −72.85 mas/yr
Parallax (π)	17.5764±0.1536 mas
Distance	186 ± 2 ly (56.9 ± 0.5 pc)
Absolute magnitude (M_{V})	0.83

Details
Mass	1.47±0.06 M_{☉}
Radius	11.22±0.08 R_{☉}
Luminosity	53.46±0.75 L_{☉}
Surface gravity (log g)	2.56±0.22 cgs
Temperature	4,670±40 K
Metallicity [Fe/H]	0.15±0.20 dex
Rotational velocity (v sin i)	6.4 km/s
Age	3.09±0.16 Gyr

Other designations
- γ Pic, CPD−56°946, FK5 1156, GC 7353, HD 39523, HIP 27530, HR 2042, SAO 234154

Database references
SIMBAD	data

Gamma Pictoris, Latinised from γ Pictoris, is a single, orange-hued star in the southern constellation of Pictor. It is a faintly visible to the naked eye with an apparent visual magnitude of 4.50. Based upon an annual parallax shift of 17.58 mas as seen from Earth, this star is located about 185 light-years from the Sun. It is moving away from the Sun with a radial velocity of +17.29 km/s.

This is an evolved K-type giant star with a stellar classification of K1 III. It has 1.5 times the mass of the Sun, while its diameter has been measured using interferometry as around 11 times that of the Sun. The star is radiating 53 times the Sun's luminosity from its enlarged photosphere at an effective temperature of around 4,670 K.
