= TV Pictoris =

Star in the constellation Pictor

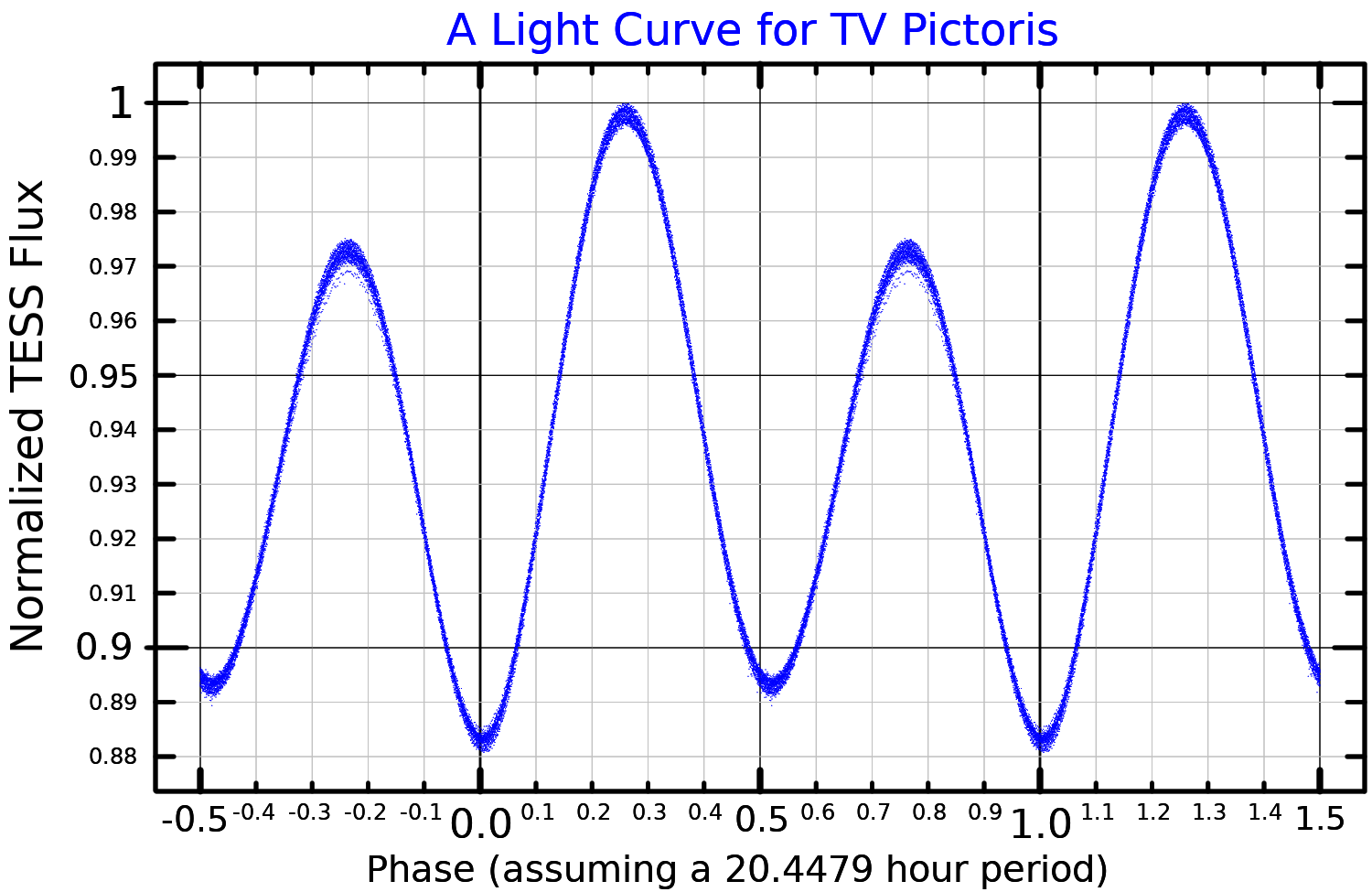
- A light curve for TV Pictoris, plotted from TESS data

Observation data Epoch J2000 Equinox ICRS
- Constellation: Pictor
- Right ascension: 04^{h} 48^{m} 57.47286^{s}
- Declination: −47° 08′ 04.2557″
- Apparent magnitude (V): 7.37 - 7.53

Characteristics

TV Pictoris A
- Spectral type: A2V
- Variable type: Ellipsoidal

TV Pictoris B
- Spectral type: A9-F0V

Other designations
- TV Pic, CD−47 1526, HD 30861, HIP 22370, SAO 217011

Database references
SIMBAD	data

TV Pictoris is a rotating ellipsoidal variable star in the constellation Pictor. It ranges between apparent magnitude 7.37 - 7.53 over a period of 0.85 days. It was first discovered to be variable in 1987. The system is inclined at an angle of 54 degrees to observers on Earth. It is composed of a primary star that has a radius 4.3 times that of the sun and 1.2 times its mass, and an effective (surface) temperature of 8300 K, and a secondary star with a radius 2.1 times that of the sun and 40% of its mass, and an effective temperature of 7000 K. Both stars are less massive than expected for a main sequence star of their temperatures. The secondary rotates much faster than the primary.

The system shines with a combined spectrum of A2V. Based upon an annual parallax shift of 5.14 milliarc seconds as measured by the Hipparcos satellite, this system is 640 light-years (195 parsecs) from Earth. Analysing and recalibrating yields a parallax of 4.70 and hence a distance of 690 light-years (213 parsecs).
