= HD 41004 =

Visual binary star in the constellation Pictor

Observation data Epoch J2000 Equinox ICRS
- Constellation: Pictor
- Right ascension: 05^{h} 59^{m} 49.65018^{s}
- Declination: −48° 14′ 22.8883″
- Apparent magnitude (V): 8.65 (8.82 + 12.51)

Characteristics
- Spectral type: K1V + M2V
- B−V color index: 0.887±0.013

Astrometry
Radial velocity (R_{v})	+42.36±0.14 km/s
Proper motion (μ)	RA: −43.418(115) mas/yr Dec.: +65.333(123) mas/yr
Parallax (π)	25.6106±0.1043 mas
Distance	127.4 ± 0.5 ly (39.0 ± 0.2 pc)
Absolute magnitude (M_{V})	5.60

Details

A
Mass	0.89±0.07 M_{☉}
Radius	1.04+0.02 −0.03 R_{☉}
Luminosity	0.629±0.008 L_{☉}
Surface gravity (log g)	4.34±0.11 cgs
Temperature	5,255±52 K
Metallicity [Fe/H]	0.15±0.03 dex
Rotational velocity (v sin i)	1.0±1.2 km/s

B
Mass	0.4 M_{☉}

Other designations
- CD−48°2083, HD 41004, HIP 28393, SAO 217660, PPM 310291, WDS J05598-4814

Database references
SIMBAD	data

HD 41004 is a visual binary star system in the southern constellation of Pictor. It is too faint to be visible to the naked eye, having a combined apparent visual magnitude of 8.65. The two components have a magnitude difference of 3.7, and share a common proper motion with an angular separation of 0.30″, as of 2018. The distance to this system is approximately 127 light-years based on parallax. It is drifting further away from the Sun with a radial velocity of +42.5 km/s, having come to within 44.5 ly some 831,000 years ago.

The primary, component A, is a K-type main-sequence star with a stellar classification of K1V and a visual magnitude of 8.82. Torres et al. (2006) classed it as a K1IV star, suggesting it is a subgiant star that is evolving off the main sequence. It has 89% of the mass of the Sun and 104% of the Sun's radius. The star is radiating 63% of the Sun's luminosity from its photosphere at an effective temperature of 5,255 K. Its smaller companion, designated component B, is a red dwarf with spectral type M2V and apparent magnitude 12.33. It has a projected separation of 23 AU from the primary.

== Companions ==
A planet, HD 41004 Ab, was discovered by Zucker et al. and published in 2004. It has a minimum mass 2.56 times that of Jupiter. It orbits the primary star at a separation of 1.70 astronomical units, taking 2.64 years with a high eccentricity of 0.74.

The HD 41004 A planetary system
Companion (in order from star)	Mass	Semimajor axis (AU)	Orbital period (days)	Eccentricity	Inclination (°)	Radius
b	≥2.54±0.74 M_{J}	1.70	963±38	0.74±0.20	—	—

HD 41004 Bb is a brown dwarf that at the time of the discovery was orbiting closer to the secondary star than any known extrasolar planet or brown dwarf (a=0.0177 AU), at only 145 km/s, because of its low-mass parent star, taking 1.3 days. Its orbit is circular despite the gravitational effect of HD 41004 A because of the tidal effect of the nearby star HD 41004 B. A search for cyclotron radiation from the magnetosphere of Bb in 2020 did not find any, indicating the planet is either weakly magnetized, or the emission cone did not point to Earth at the time of observation.

The HD 41004 B planetary system
Companion (in order from star)	Mass	Semimajor axis (AU)	Orbital period (days)	Eccentricity	Inclination (°)	Radius
b	≥18.37±0.22 M_{J}	0.0177	1.328300(12)	0.081±0.012	—	—
