= GRB 060729 =

Gamma-ray burst

- Event type: Gamma-ray burst
- Right ascension: 06^{h} 21^{m} 31.850^{s}
- Declination: −62° 22′ 12.69″
- Epoch: J2000
- Other designations: GRB 060729

GRB 060729 was a gamma-ray burst that was first observed on 29 July 2006. It is likely the signal of a type Ic supernova—the core collapse of a massive star. It was also notable for its extraordinarily long X-ray afterglow, detectable 642 days (nearly two years) after the original event. The event was remote, with a redshift of 0.54.
