= Eta2 Pictoris =

Star in the constellation Pictor

Eta^{2} Pictoris
Observation data Epoch J2000.0 Equinox J2000.0 (ICRS)
- Constellation: Pictor
- Right ascension: 05^{h} 04^{m} 58.01433^{s}
- Declination: −49° 34′ 40.2034″
- Apparent magnitude (V): 5.02

Characteristics
- Spectral type: K5 III
- U−B color index: +1.82
- B−V color index: +1.51
- Variable type: suspected

Astrometry
Radial velocity (R_{v})	−5.0±7.4 km/s
Proper motion (μ)	RA: +68.538 mas/yr Dec.: −2.186 mas/yr
Parallax (π)	7.8033±0.1351 mas
Distance	418 ± 7 ly (128 ± 2 pc)
Absolute magnitude (M_{V})	−1.2

Details
Radius	40.56+0.59 −2.38 R_{☉}
Luminosity	362.6±7.4 L_{☉}
Temperature	3,955+121 −28 K

Other designations
- η^{2} Pic, NSV 1827, CD−49°1562, FK5 187, GC 6234, HD 33042, HIP 23649, HR 1663, SAO 217164

Database references
SIMBAD	data

η^{2} Pictoris, Latinised as Eta^{2} Pictoris, is a solitary star in the southern constellation of Pictor. It is visible to the naked eye as a dim, orange-hued star with an apparent visual magnitude of 5.02. With an annual parallax shift of 7.8 mas as seen from the Earth, it is located around 418 light years from the Sun. It is a member of the HR 1614 moving group of stars that share a common motion through space.

This is an evolved K-type giant star with a stellar classification of K5 III, having exhausted the supply of hydrogen at its core, then cooled and expanded off the main sequence. At present it has 41 times the girth of the Sun. It is radiating an estimated 363.5 times the Sun's luminosity from its photosphere at an effective temperature of 4,136 K. This is a member of the old disk population and is a suspected variable star.
