= Eta1 Pictoris =

Star in the constellation Pictor

Eta^{1} Pictoris
Observation data Epoch J2000.0 Equinox J2000.0 (ICRS)
- Constellation: Pictor
- Right ascension: 05^{h} 02^{m} 48.68641^{s}
- Declination: −49° 09′ 05.0644″
- Apparent magnitude (V): +5.37

Characteristics
- Spectral type: F5 V
- U−B color index: −0.01
- B−V color index: +0.43

Astrometry
Radial velocity (R_{v})	21.4±2.8 km/s
Proper motion (μ)	RA: −43.67 mas/yr Dec.: +27.37 mas/yr
Parallax (π)	38.35±0.18 mas
Distance	85.0 ± 0.4 ly (26.1 ± 0.1 pc)
Absolute magnitude (M_{V})	3.28

Details
Mass	1.37 M_{☉}
Radius	1.469 R_{☉}
Luminosity	3.74 L_{☉}
Surface gravity (log g)	4.17 cgs
Temperature	6,631±225 K
Metallicity [Fe/H]	−0.05 dex
Rotational velocity (v sin i)	22.7±1.1 km/s
Age	2.15 Gyr

Other designations
- η^{1} Pic, CD−49°1541, GJ 187, HD 32743, HIP 23482, HR 1649, SAO 217140

Database references
SIMBAD	data

η^{1} Pictoris, Latinised as Eta^{1} Pictoris, is a solitary star in the southern constellation of Pictor. It is faintly visible to the naked eye with an apparent visual magnitude of +5.37. Based upon an annual parallax shift of 38.35 mas as seen from the Earth, the system is located 85 light years from the Sun. The star made its closest approach to the Sun about 1.1 million years ago with a perihelion passage of about 24 ly (7.5 pc).

This is an F-type main sequence star with a stellar classification of F5 V and it is chromospherically active. It is an estimated 2.15 billion years old and is spinning with a projected rotational velocity of 22.7 km/s. The star has 1.4 times the mass of the Sun and about 1.47 times the Sun's radius. It is radiating 3.7 times the Sun's luminosity from its photosphere at an effective temperature of roughly 6,631 K.
