= Alpha Pictoris =

Brightest star in the southern constellation of Pictor

α Pictoris
- Location of α Pictoris (circled)

Observation data Epoch J2000 Equinox J2000
- Constellation: Pictor
- Right ascension: 06^{h} 48^{m} 11.45512^{s}
- Declination: −61° 56′ 29.0008″
- Apparent magnitude (V): 3.27

Characteristics
- Evolutionary stage: Main sequence
- Spectral type: A8 Vn kA6
- U−B color index: +0.13
- B−V color index: +0.21

Astrometry
Radial velocity (R_{v})	+20.6 km/s
Proper motion (μ)	RA: −66.07 mas/yr Dec.: +242.97 mas/yr
Parallax (π)	33.78±1.78 mas
Distance	97 ± 5 ly (30 ± 2 pc)
Absolute magnitude (M_{V})	0.86

Orbit
Period (P)	1,316±2 days
Semi-major axis (a)	3.25 AU (Note: Calculated using a^{3} = (M_{1} + M_{2}) • P^{2}, where a is the semi-major axis in astronomical units, M_{1} and M_{2} are the primary and secondary's mass respectively, in M_{☉}, and P is the period in years.)
Eccentricity (e)	0.29±0.02
Inclination (i)	121±2°
Longitude of the node (Ω)	219±4°
Periastron epoch (T)	2456390±13 BJD
Argument of periastron (ω) (secondary)	353±4°

Details

A
Mass	1.6±0.1 M_{☉}
Radius	3.55 R_{☉}
Luminosity	38.7+6.0 −5.2 L_{☉}
Surface gravity (log g)	3.61±0.04 cgs
Temperature	7,451±75 K
Metallicity [Fe/H]	−0.06±0.03 dex
Rotational velocity (v sin i)	213.5 km/s
Age	660 Myr

B
Mass	1.05±0.05 M_{☉}
Temperature	5,068±91 K

Other designations
- CD−61°1478, Gl 248, HD 50241, HIP 32607, HR 2550, LTT 2656, SAO 249647.

Database references
SIMBAD	data

Alpha Pictoris (α Pic, α Pictoris) is the brightest star in the southern constellation of Pictor. It has an apparent visual magnitude of 3.27, which is bright enough to be viewed from urban areas in the southern hemisphere. This is actually a binary star system, whose components complete an orbit every three years and seven months. It is close enough for its distance to be measured using parallax shifts, which yields a value of roughly 97 light-years (30 parsecs) from the Sun, with a 5% margin of error. Alpha Pictoris has the distinction of being the south pole star of the planet Mercury.

== Properties ==
The primary component is classified as a Lambda Boötis star. The stellar classification of A8 Vn kA6 shows this peculiarity, with the kA6 notation indicating weaker than normal calcium K-lines in the spectrum. The 'n' following the main sequence luminosity class of V indicates the absorption lines in the spectrum are broad and nebulous. This is caused by the rapid spin of the star, which has a high projected rotational velocity of 206 km/s. Spectroscopy shows narrow, time-varying absorption features being caused by circumstellar gas moving toward the star. This is not the result of interstellar matter, but a shell of gas along the orbital plane. Alpha Pictoris is categorized as a rapidly rotating shell star that may have recently ejected mass from its outer atmosphere.

Alpha Pictoris A is larger than the Sun, with a 60% greater mass and a 355% greater radius. Its estimated age is roughly 660 million years, even though it is already nearing its main sequence lifetime, having gone through 94% of the expected timespan on this stage of evolution. It is radiating 40 times as much luminosity as the Sun from its outer atmosphere at an effective temperature of 7,451 K. At this heat, the star glows with the white hue of an A-type star. It is also one of the brightest known Delta Scuti variables. The space velocity components of this star in the galactic coordinate system are U = -22, V = -20 and W = -9 km/s.

Data from the Hipparcos mission uncovered the presence of a binary companion with a companion orbiting at a semimajor axis of around 3.25 AU, or three times the distance from Earth to the Sun. Alpha Pictoris is an X-ray source, which is unusual for an A-type star since stellar models don't predict them to have magnetic dynamos. This emission may instead be originating from the companion.
