= Pictor =

Constellation in the southern celestial hemisphere

- Constellation
- List of stars in Pictor
- Abbreviation: Pic
- Genitive: Pictoris
- Pronunciation: /ˈpɪktər/, genitive /pɪkˈtoʊrɪs/
- Symbolism: Easel
- Right ascension: 4.53^{h} –6.85^{h}
- Declination: −43°–−64°
- Quadrant: SQ1
- Area: 247 sq. deg. (59th)
- Main stars: 3
- Bayer/Flamsteed stars: 15
- Stars brighter than 3.00^{m}: 0
- Stars within 10.00 pc (32.62 ly): 1
- Brightest star: α Pic (3.30^{m})
- Nearest star: Kapteyn's Star
- Messier objects: 0
- Meteor showers: 0
- Bordering constellations: Caelum; Carina; Columba; Dorado; Puppis; Volans
- Visible at latitudes between +26° and −90°. Best visible at 21:00 (9 p.m.) during the month of January.

Pictor is a constellation in the Southern Celestial Hemisphere, located between the star Canopus and the Large Magellanic Cloud. Its name is Latin for painter, and is an abbreviation of the older name Equuleus Pictoris (the "painter's easel"). Normally represented as an easel, Pictor was named by Abbé Nicolas-Louis de Lacaille in the 18th century. The constellation's brightest star is Alpha Pictoris, a white main-sequence star around 97 light-years away from Earth. Pictor also hosts RR Pictoris, a cataclysmic variable star system that flared up as a nova, reaching apparent (visual) magnitude 1.2 in 1925 before fading into obscurity. (Note: Deneb, the 19th-brightest star in the night sky, has a magnitude of 1.25.)

Pictor has attracted attention because of its second-brightest star Beta Pictoris, 63.4 light-years distant from Earth, which is surrounded by an unusual dust disk rich in carbon, as well as three exoplanets (extrasolar planets). Another five stars in the constellation have been observed to have planets. Among them is HD 40307, an orange dwarf that has six planets orbiting it, one of which—HD 40307 g—is a potential super-Earth in the circumstellar habitable zone. Kapteyn's Star, the nearest star in Pictor to Earth, is a red dwarf located 12.76 light-years away that was believed to have two super-Earths in orbit in 2014, but their existence of these planets was disproven in 2021. Pictor A is a radio galaxy that is shooting an 800,000 light-year long jet of plasma from a supermassive black hole at its centre. In 2006, a gamma-ray burst—GRB 060729—was observed in Pictor, its extremely long X-ray afterglow detectable for nearly two years.

== History ==
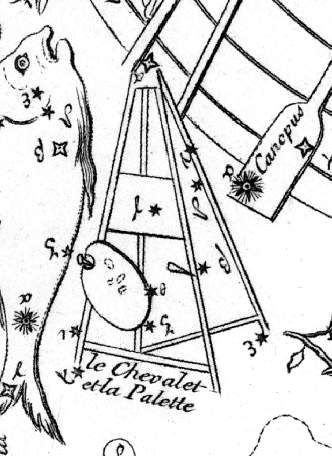
Early depiction c.1756, when known as le Chevalet et la Palette; Canopus of Carina (the keel, or the hull, of the ship) seen at upper right

The French astronomer Abbé Nicolas-Louis de Lacaille first described Pictor as le Chevalet et la Palette (the easel and palette) in 1756, after observing and cataloguing 10,000 southern stars during a two-year stay at the Cape of Good Hope. (Note: His observatory was in a private house on the shores of Table Bay in Cape Town.) He devised 14 new constellations in uncharted regions of the Southern Celestial Hemisphere not visible from Europe. All but one honored instruments that symbolised the Age of Enlightenment. He gave these constellations Bayer designations, including ten stars in Pictor now named Alpha to Nu Pictoris. (Note: He erred in naming the wrong star with the Greek letter epsilon, which is now not used.) He labelled the constellation Equuleus Pictorius on his 1763 chart, the word "Equuleus" meaning small horse, or easel—perhaps from an old custom among artists of carrying a canvas on a donkey. The German astronomer Johann Bode called it Pluteum Pictoris. The name was shortened to its current form in 1845 by the English astronomer Francis Baily on the suggestion of his countryman Sir John Herschel.

== Characteristics ==
Pictor is a small constellation bordered by Columba to the north, Puppis and Carina to the east, Caelum to the northwest, Dorado to the southwest and Volans to the south. The three-letter abbreviation for the constellation, as adopted by the International Astronomical Union in 1922, is "Pic". The official constellation boundaries, as set by Belgian astronomer Eugène Delporte in 1930, are defined by a polygon of 18 segments (illustrated in infobox). In the equatorial coordinate system, the right ascension coordinates of these borders lie between 04^{h} 32.5^{m} and 06^{h} 52.0^{m} , while the declination coordinates are between −42.79° and −64.15°. Pictor culminates each year at 9 p.m. on 17 March. Its position in the far Southern Celestial Hemisphere means that the whole constellation is visible to observers south of latitude 26°N, (Note: While parts of the constellation technically rise above the horizon to observers between 26°N and 47°N, stars within a few degrees of the horizon are to all intents and purposes unobservable.) and parts become circumpolar south of latitude 35°S.

== Features ==
=== Stars ===
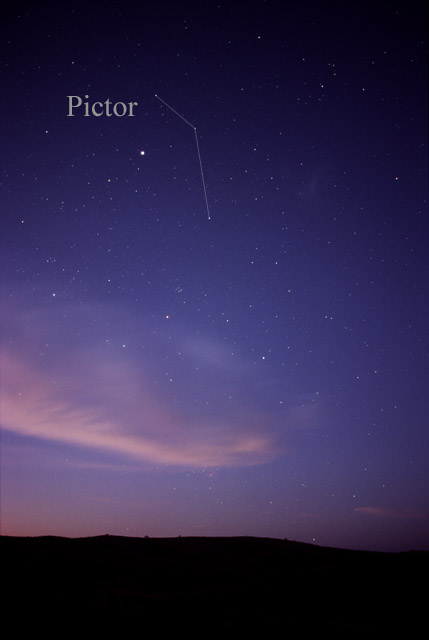
A photograph showing constellation Pictor as it can be seen by the naked eye (lines have been added that join up its three main stars). The bright star seen near Pictor is Canopus.

Pictor is a faint constellation; its three brightest stars can be seen near the prominent Canopus. Within the constellation's borders, there are 49 stars brighter than or equal to apparent magnitude 6.5. (Note: Objects of magnitude 6.5 are among the faintest visible to the unaided eye in suburban-rural transition night skies) At apparent magnitude 3.3, Alpha Pictoris is the brightest star in the constellation; it is an astrometric binary 97 light-years from Earth. The primary of this system is an A-type star of spectral type A8VnkA6, (Note: The kA6 notation indicates a weaker than normal calcium K-line in the spectrum. The 'n' following the main sequence luminosity class of V indicates the absorption lines in the spectrum are broad and nebulous, because of the rapid spin of the star.) a rapidly spinning star with a projected rotational velocity estimated at 206 km/s with has a shell of circumstellar gas. Beta Pictoris is another white main sequence star of spectral type A6V and apparent magnitude 3.86. Located around 63.4 light-years distant from Earth, it is a member of the Beta Pictoris moving group—a group of 17 star systems around 12 million years old moving through space together. In 1984 Beta Pictoris was the first star discovered to have a debris disk. Since then, two exoplanets with masses over ten times the mass of Jupiter have been discovered orbiting between 2.7 and eight astronomical units (AU) away from the star, which fit between the asteroid belt and the orbit of Saturn. Beta Pictoris b was discovered using direct imagery with the Very Large Telescope in late 2009, while Beta Pictoris c was discovered via doppler spectroscopy (radial velocity method) in August 2009. A third planet with a lower mass of 2-3 times the mass of Jupiter, Beta Pictoris d, was discovered in 2026 using direct imaging and spectral template matching with moderate-resolution spectroscopy.

Gamma Pictoris is an orange giant of spectral type K1III that has swollen to 11 times the diameter of the Sun. Shining with an apparent magnitude of 4.5, it lies 186 light-years distant from Earth. HD 42540, called 47 Pictoris by American astronomer Benjamin Apthorp Gould, is a slightly cooler orange giant, with a spectral type of K2.5III and average magnitude 5.04. It has also been suspected of being a variable star. Lacaille mistakenly named this star Mu Doradus, but had recorded its Right Ascension one hour too low. Lacaille named two neighbouring stars Eta Pictoris. (Note: Like Bayer, Lacaille would simply give two stars very close to each other the same designation with no modifier. It was left to later astronomers such as Gould to designate Eta^{1}, Eta^{2} etc.) Eta^{2} Pictoris, also known as HR 1663, is an orange giant of spectral type K5III and apparent magnitude 5.05. 474 light-years distant, it has a diameter 5.6 times that of the Sun. Eta^{1} Pictoris, also known as HR 1649, is 85 light-years distant and is a main sequence star of spectral type F5V and visual magnitude 5.38. A double star, it has a companion of magnitude 13; the two are separated by 11 arcseconds.

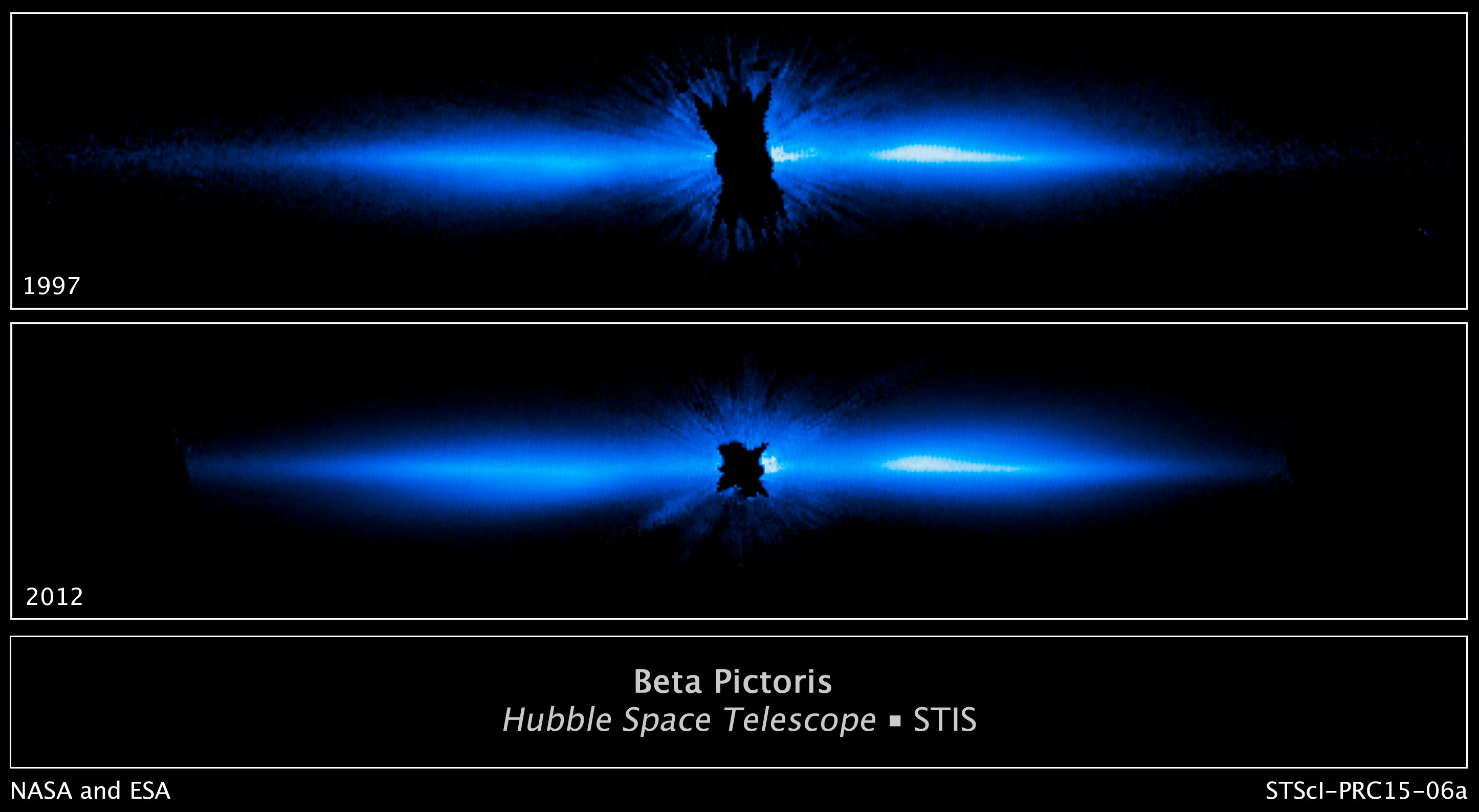
Beta Pictoris Comparison

Located about 1298 light-years from Earth, Delta Pictoris is an eclipsing binary of the Beta Lyrae type. Composed of two blue stars of spectral types B3III and O9V, the system has a period of 1.67 days, and is observed to dip from apparent magnitude 4.65 to 4.9. The stars are oval-shaped as they are gravitationally distorted by each other. TV Pictoris is a spectroscopic binary system composed of an A-type star and an F-type star which rotate around each other in a very close orbit. The latter star is elliptical in shape and itself varies in brightness. The visual magnitude ranges between 7.37 and 7.53 every 20 hours.

Aside from Beta, five other stars in Pictor are known to host planetary systems. AB Pictoris is a BY Draconis variable star with a substellar companion that is either a large planet or a brown dwarf, which was discovered by direct imaging in 2005. HD 40307 is an orange main sequence star of spectral type K2.5V and apparent magnitude 7.17 located about 42 light-years away. Doppler spectroscopy with the High Accuracy Radial Velocity Planet Searcher (HARPS) indicates that HD 40307 is host to six super-Earth planets, one of which, HD 40307 g, lies in the circumstellar habitable zone of the star, and is not close enough to be tidally locked (i.e. with the same face always facing the star), unlike the other planets in the same system, and many other planets which orbit close to their parent stars. HD 41004 is a complex binary system about 139 light-years distant. The primary is an orange dwarf of spectral type K1V orbited by a planet roughly 2.65 times the mass of Jupiter every 963 days, while the secondary is a red dwarf of spectral type M2V and orbited by a brown dwarf that is at least 19 times as massive as Jupiter. Both substellar components were discovered by doppler spectroscopy using the CORALIE spectrograph in 2004 and 2002 respectively. Kapteyn's Star, a nearby red dwarf at the distance of 12.78 light-years, has a magnitude of 8.8. It has the largest proper motion of any star in the sky after Barnard's Star. Moving around the Milky Way in the opposite direction to most other stars, it may have originated in a dwarf galaxy that was merged into the Milky Way, with the main remnant being the Omega Centauri globular cluster. In 2014 analysis of the doppler variations of Kapteyn's Star with the HARPS spectrograph showed that it hosts two super-Earths—Kapteyn b and Kapteyn c, but the existence of these exoplanet was disproven in 2021. It is believed that these planets were actually just artifacts of the Kapteyn' star's rotation and activity.

Located 1.5 degrees west southwest of Alpha, RR Pictoris is a cataclysmic variable that flared up as a nova, reaching magnitude 1.2 on 9 June 1925. Six months after its peak brightness, it had faded to be invisible to the unaided eye, and was magnitude 12.5 by 1975. RR Pictoris is a close binary system composed of a white dwarf and secondary star that orbit each other every 3.48 hours—so close that the secondary is filling up its Roche lobe with stellar material, which is then transferred onto the first star's accretion disk. Once this material reaches a critical mass, it ignites and the system brightens tremendously. Calculations from the orbital speed suggest the secondary star is not dense enough for its size to still be on the main sequence, so it also must have begun expanding and cooling already after its core ran out of hydrogen fuel. The RR Pictoris system is estimated to lie around 1300 light-years distant from Earth.

=== Deep-sky objects ===
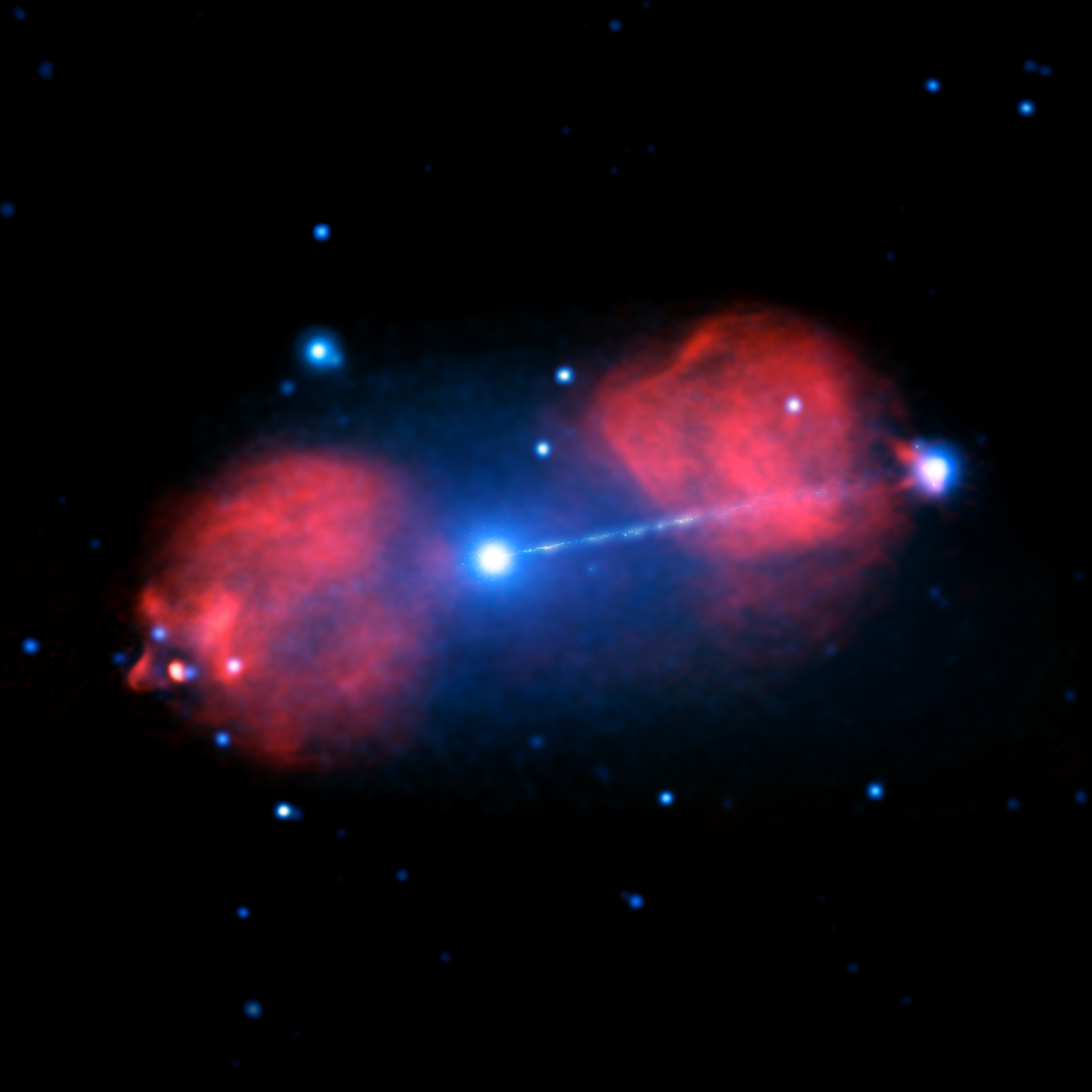
Composite image in X-rays by Chandra X-ray Observatory (blue) and radiowaves by Australia Telescope Compact Array (red) showing two lobes and a jet of plasma emanating from Pictor A

NGC 1705 is an irregular dwarf galaxy 17 million light-years from Earth. It is one of the most active star forming galaxies in the nearby universe, despite the fact that its rate of star formation peaked around 30 million years ago. Pictor A, around 485 million light-years away, is a double-lobed radio galaxy and a powerful source of radio waves in the Southern Celestial Hemisphere. From a supermassive black hole at its centre, a relativistic jet shoots out to an X-ray hot spot 800,000 light years away. SPT-CL J0546-5345 is a massive galaxy cluster located around 7 billion light-years away with a mass equivalent to approximately 800 trillion suns.

GRB 060729 was a gamma-ray burst that was first observed on 29 July 2006. It is likely the signal of a type Ic supernova—the core collapse of a massive star. It was also notable for its extraordinarily long X-ray afterglow, detectable 642 days (nearly two years) after the original event. The event was remote, with a redshift of 0.54.

== See also ==
- Pictor (Chinese astronomy)
