= NGC 4605 =

Galaxy in the constellation Ursa Major

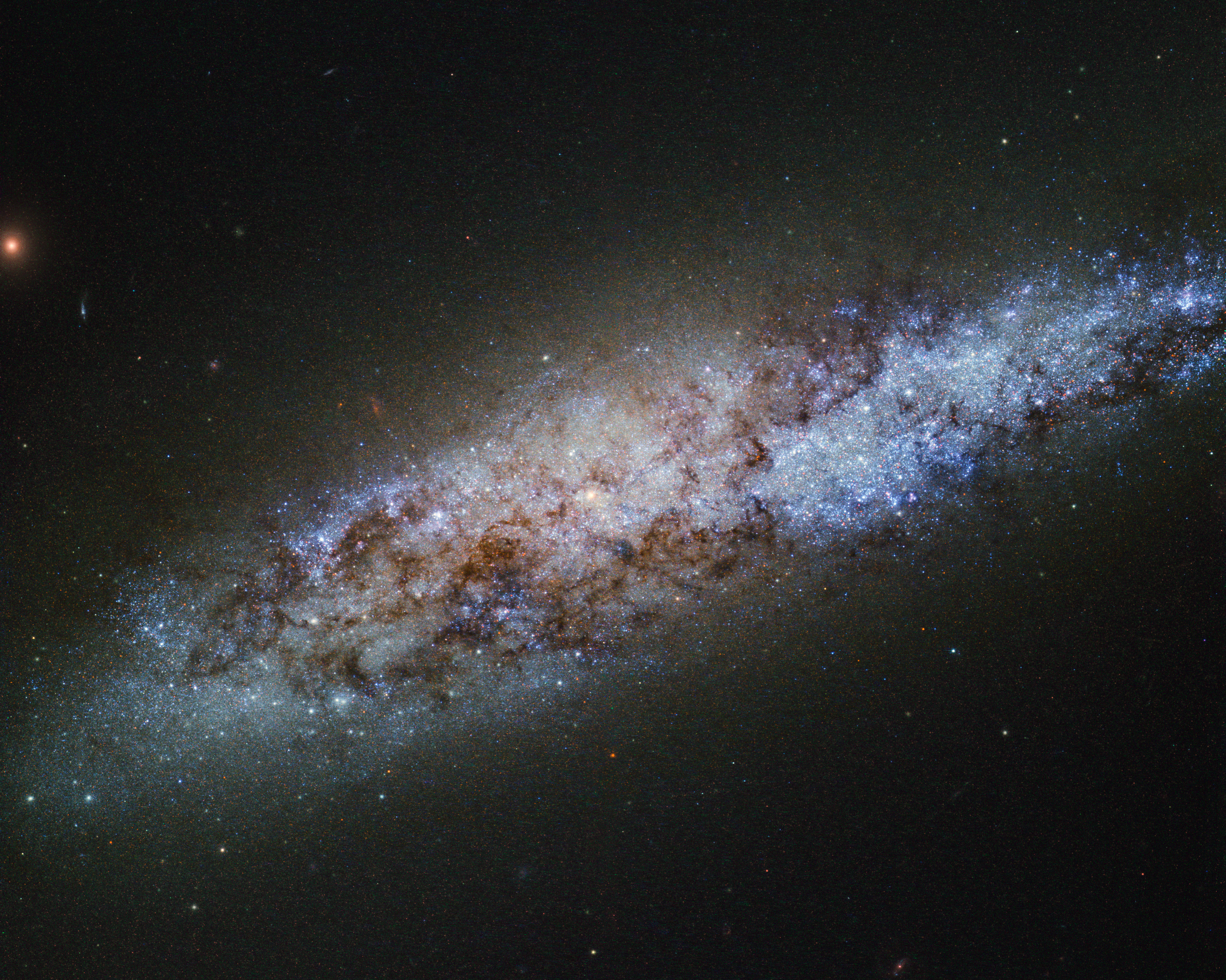
- NGC 4605 by Hubble.

Observation data (J2000 epoch)
- Constellation: Ursa Major
- Right ascension: 12^{h} 39^{m} 59.381^{s}
- Declination: +61° 36′ 33.09″
- Redshift: 0.000484±0.000020
- Heliocentric radial velocity: 143±5 km/s
- Distance: 18.10 ± 0.33 Mly (5.55 ± 0.10 Mpc)
- Apparent magnitude (V): 10.1
- Absolute magnitude (B): –18.10

Characteristics
- Type: SBc or SB(s)c pec
- Mass/Light ratio: 0.25±0.03 M_{☉}/L_{☉}
- Apparent size (V): 6.03′ × 2.45′

Other designations
- NGC 4605, UGC 7831, PGC 42408

NGC 4605 is a dwarf barred spiral galaxy in the northern constellation of Ursa Major. Alternatively, it is known as the Fabergé Egg Galaxy or Frankenstein Galaxy. It has an apparent visual magnitude of 10.1 and spans an angular size of 6.0′ × 2.5′. Physically it is similar in size and in B-band absolute magnitude to the Large Magellanic Cloud. Located at a distance of 18.1 ± 0.3 megalight-years from the Milky Way, it is a possible member of either the M81 Galaxy Group or the Messier 101 Group.

The morphological classification of NGC 4605 is SBc, which usually indicates it is a spiral galaxy with a central bar (SB) and loosely wound spiral arms (c). However, it has a peculiar morphology that is similar to NGC 2976, displaying neither a central component nor a distinct spiral form. The plane of this galaxy is inclined at an angle of about 69° to the plane of the sky. It has a maximum rotational velocity of ~100 km/s. The rotation pattern is similar to a rigid body, causing issues with cold-dark matter models.
