= 2976 =

2976 (MMCMLXXVI) is a number in the 2000s range.

2976, 2976th, 1/2976, MMCMLXXVI, may also refer to:

== Years ==
- 2976 AD (MMCMLXXVI), a year in the 30th century of the Common Era
- 2976 BC, a year in the 3rd millennium Before the Common Era

== Places ==
- 2976 Lautaro, asteroid Lautaro, the 2976th asteroid registered, asteroid #2976, an asteroid in the Asteroid Belt
- Farm to Market Road 2976, Texas, USA; a highway in Texas, route 2976

== Other uses ==
- UPS Airlines Flight 2976 (4 November 2025), a cargo flight on a MD-11 from UPS that crashed on take-off at Louisville International Airport in Kentucky, United States

== See also ==
- NGC 2976, a dwarf galaxy in the constellation Ursa Major
