= UGC 5497 =

Dwarf galaxy in the constellation Ursa Major

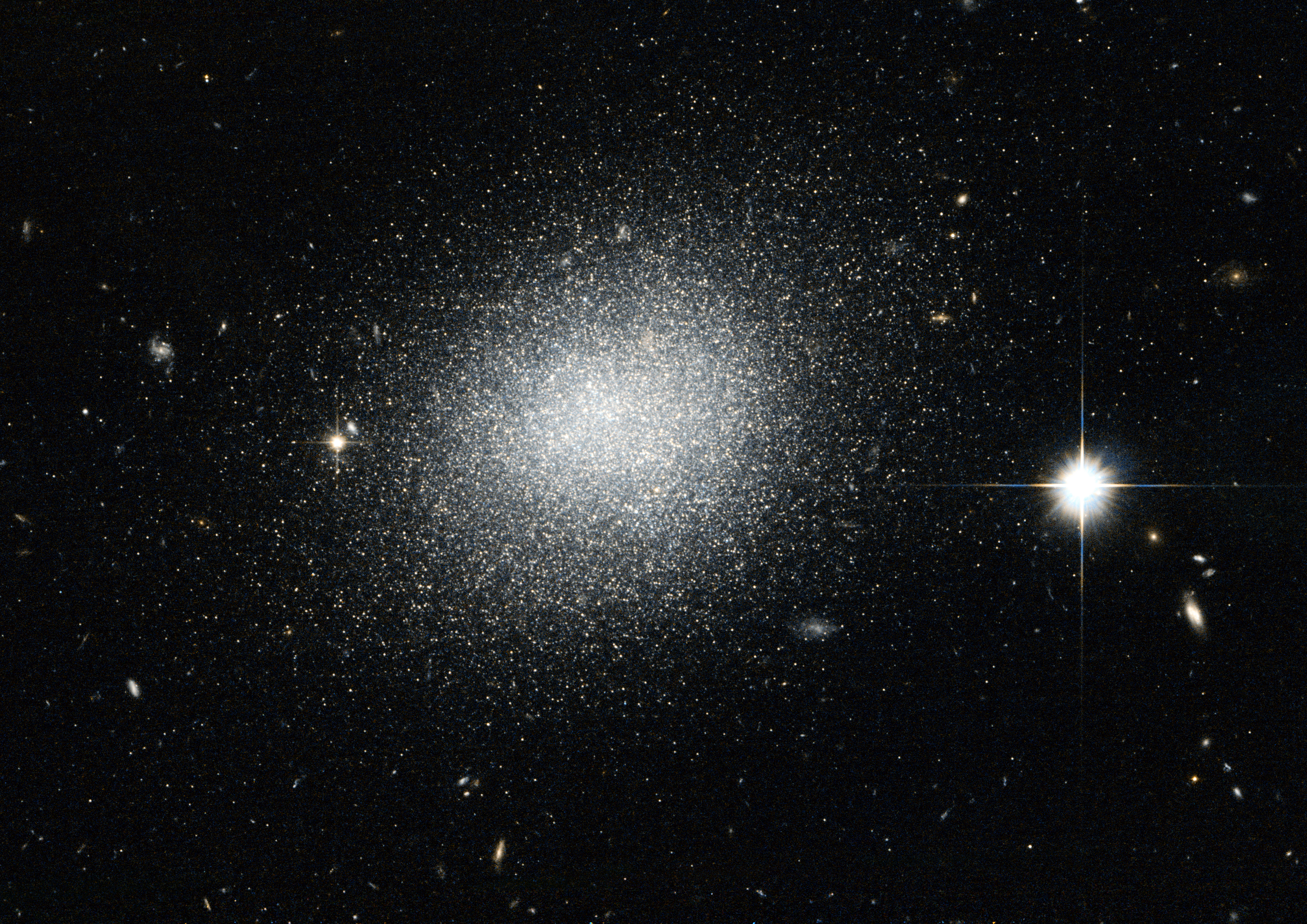
- Hubble image of UGC 5497. The object is a compact blue dwarf galaxy that is infused with newly formed clusters of stars.

Observation data (J2000 epoch)
- Constellation: Ursa Major
- Right ascension: 10^{h} 12^{m} 48.48^{s}
- Declination: +64° 06′ 26.8″
- Distance: 12,000,000 ± 00 kly (3,679,217 ± 0 kpc)h^{−1}_{0.73}
- Group or cluster: Messier 81

Characteristics
- Type: dI

Other designations
- MCG+11-13-007, Z 1009.1+6422, LEDA 29735, Z 313-5

UGC 5497 is a dwarf galaxy, located about 12 million light years away in the constellation Ursa Major. It is a member of the M81 Group.

== See also ==
- Lists of galaxies
