= NGC 3738 =

Dwarf galaxy in the constellation Ursa Major

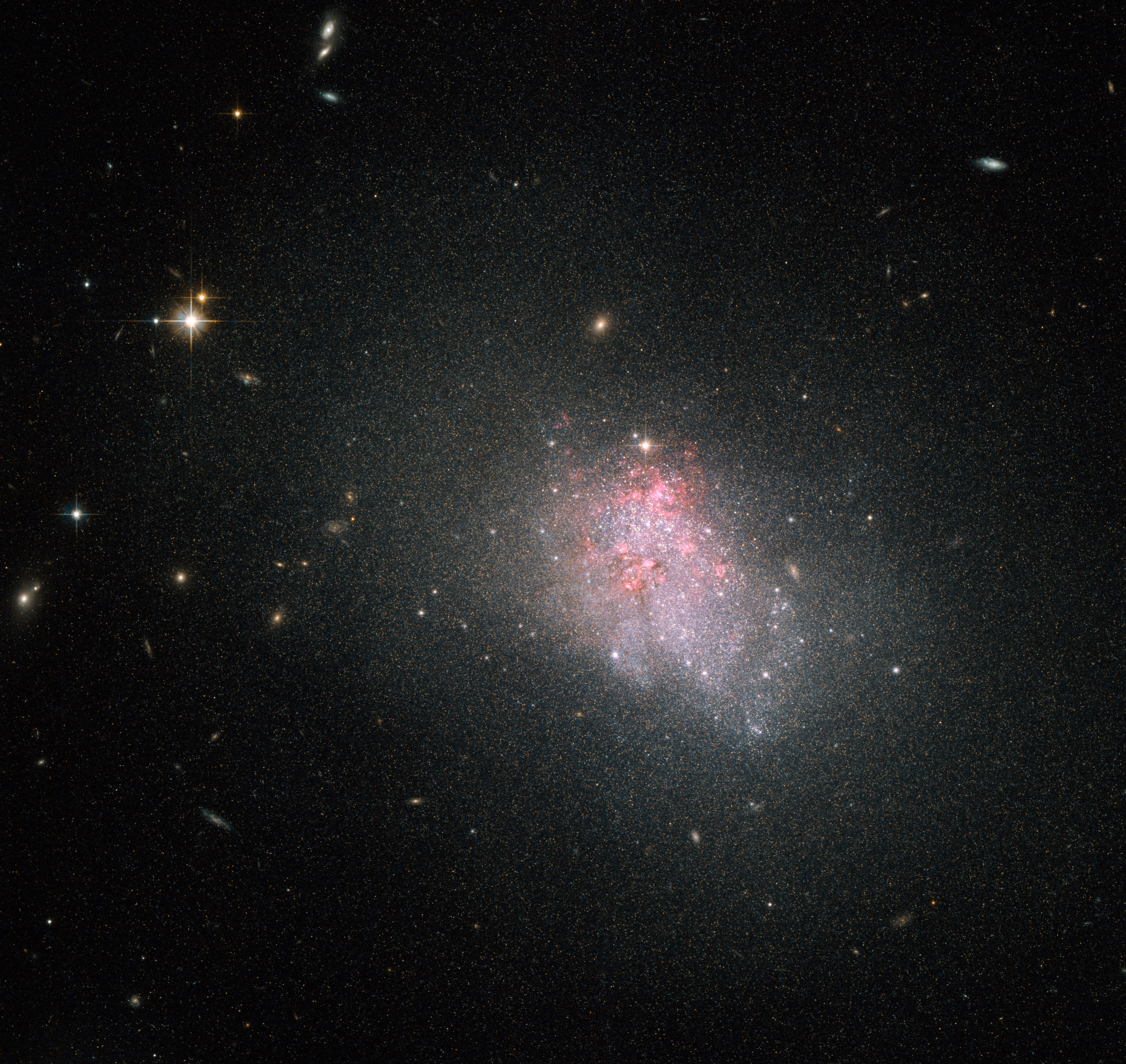
- NGC 3738 image created by combining visual and infrared images taken with the Hubble Space Telescope.

Observation data (J2000 epoch)
- Constellation: Ursa Major
- Right ascension: 11^{h} 35^{m} 47.1^{s}
- Declination: +54° 31′ 32″
- Redshift: 0.00072
- Heliocentric radial velocity: 217 km/s
- Distance: 12 million light years
- Apparent magnitude (V): 12.04

Characteristics
- Type: Im
- Notable features: Dwarf galaxy

Other designations
- Arp 234, MCG+09-19-130, IRAS 11330+5448,, KUG 1133+548, PGC 35856, UGC 6565, UZC J113548.5+543128

NGC 3738 is a dwarf galaxy in the constellation of Ursa Major and belongs to the M81 Group of galaxies. NGC 3738 is 12 million light-years from the Sun. The galaxy was first discovered by astronomer William Herschel in 1789. NGC 3738 is a blue compact dwarf, which is small compared to large spiral galaxies. The galaxy is about 10,000 light-years across. It is one-tenth the size of the Milky Way.

Blue compact dwarf galaxies are blue in appearance because of the large cluster of hot massive stars. The galaxies are relatively dim and appear to be irregular in shape. They are typically chaotic in appearance.
