= NGC 3077 =

Galaxy in the constellation Ursa Major

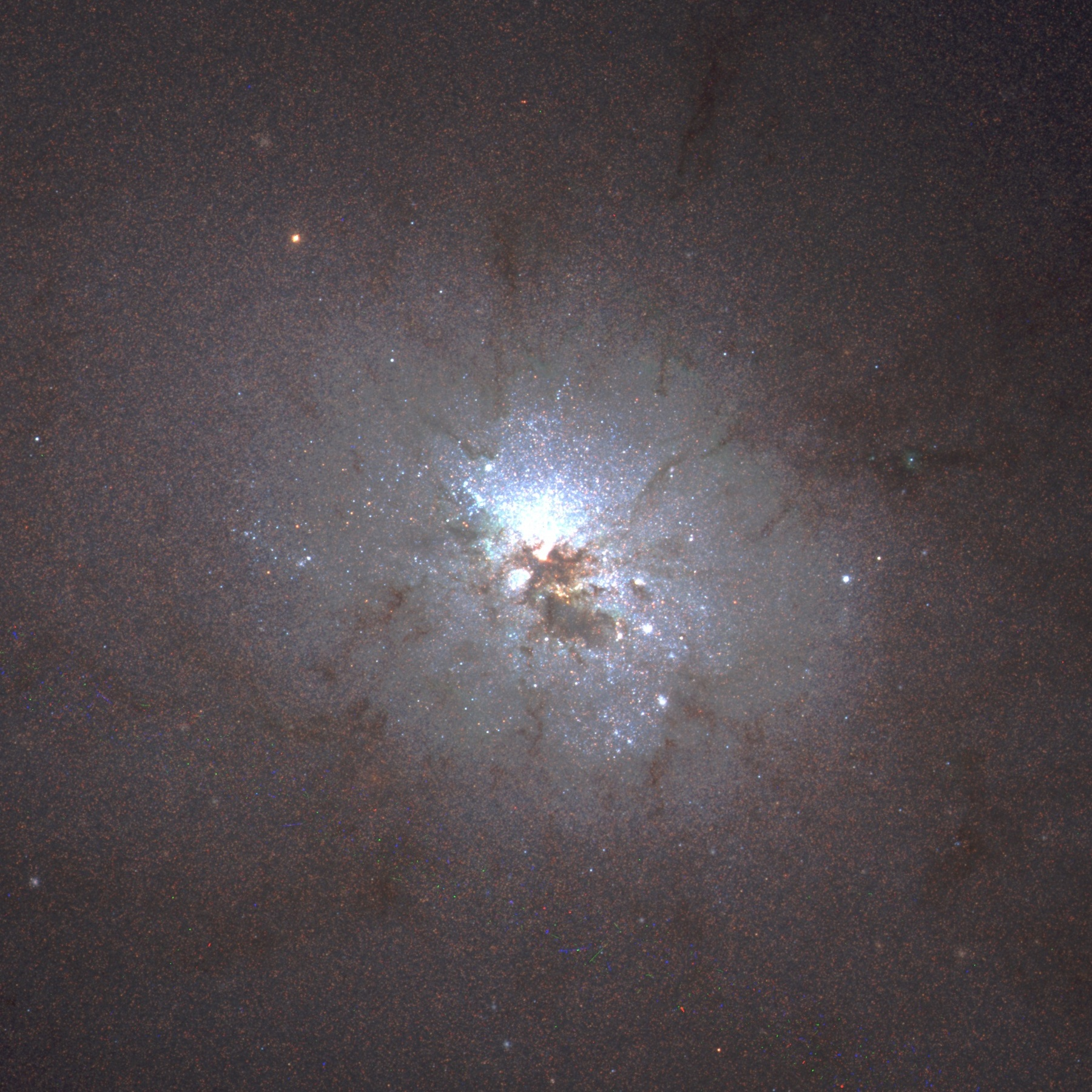
- NGC 3077 by HST, 1.5′ view

Observation data (J2000 epoch)
- Constellation: Ursa Major
- Right ascension: 10^{h} 03^{m} 19.1^{s}
- Declination: +68° 44′ 02″
- Redshift: 14±4 km/s
- Distance: 12.8 ± 0.7 Mly (3.9 ± 0.2 Mpc)^{[a]}
- Apparent magnitude (V): 10.0

Characteristics
- Type: I0 pec
- Apparent size (V): 5.2′ × 4.7′

Other designations
- NGC 3077, UGC 5398, PGC 29146

NGC 3077 is a small disrupted elliptical galaxy, a member of the M81 Group, which is located in the northern constellation of Ursa Major. Despite being similar to an elliptical galaxy in appearance, it is peculiar for two reasons. First, it shows wispy edges and scattered dust clouds that are probably a result of gravitational interaction with its larger neighbors, similar to the galaxy M82. Second, this galaxy has an active nucleus. This caused Carl Seyfert in 1943 to include it in his list of galaxies, which are now called Seyfert Galaxies. However, NGC 3077, though an emission line galaxy, is today no longer classified as a Seyfert galaxy.

NGC 3077 was discovered by William Herschel on November 8, 1801. He remarked that "On the nF (NE) side, there is a faint ray interrupting the roundness." Admiral Smyth described it as "A bright-class round nebula; it is a lucid white, and lights up in the centre ... between these [stars,] the sky is intensely black, and shows the nebula as if floating in awful and illimitable space, at an inconceivable distance."

An irregular dwarf object known as the "Garland" is located near NGC 3077.

== Distance measurements ==
At least two techniques have been used to measure distances to NGC 3077. The surface brightness fluctuations (SBF) distance measurement technique estimates distances to spiral galaxies based on the graininess of the appearance of their bulges. The distance measured to NGC 3077 using this technique is 13.2 ± 0.8 Mly (4.0 ± 0.2 Mpc). However, NGC 3077 is close enough that the tip of the red giant branch (TRGB) method may be used to estimate its distance. The estimated distance to NGC 3077 using this technique is 12.5 ± 1.2 Mly (3.82 ± 0.38 Mpc). Averaged together, these distance measurements give a distance estimate of 12.8 ± 0.7 Mly (3.9 ± 0.3 Mpc).^{[a]}

== Sources ==
- NGC 3077 at SEDS

== Notes ==
1. average(4.0 ± 0.2, 3.82 ± 0.38) = ((4.0 + 3.82) / 2) ± ((0.2^{2} + 0.38^{2})/2)^{0.5} = 3.9 ± 0.3
