= Holmberg IX =

Dwarf irregular galaxy in the constellation of Ursa Major

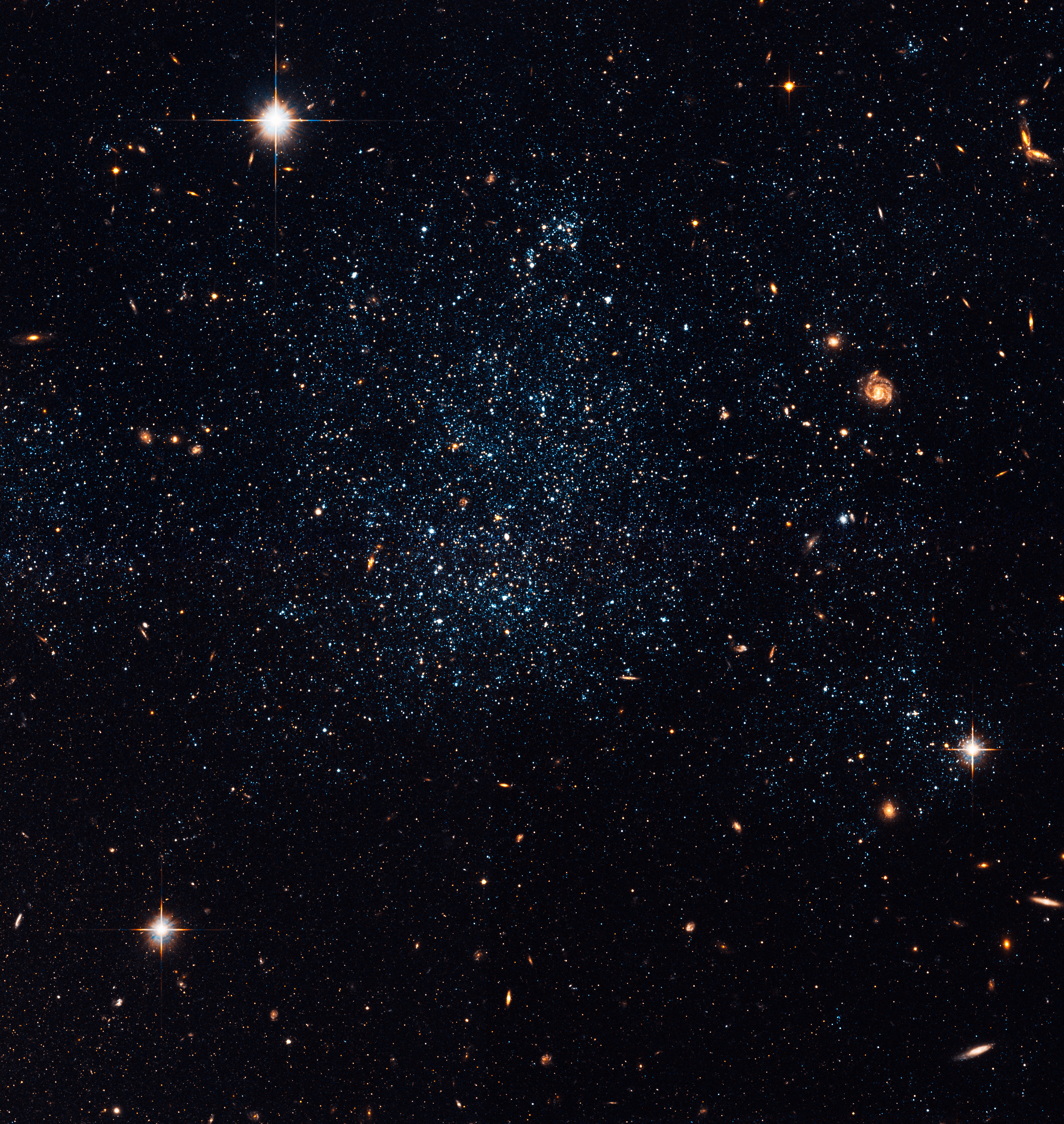
- Hubble Space Telescope image of the dwarf irregular galaxy Holmberg IX

Observation data (J2000 epoch)
- Constellation: Ursa Major
- Right ascension: 09^{h} 57^{m} 32.1^{s}
- Declination: +69° 02′ 46″
- Distance: 12 Mly (3.6 Mpc)
- Apparent magnitude (V): 16.5

Characteristics
- Type: dI
- Apparent size (V): 1.41 ± 0.07
- Notable features: Satellite galaxy of Messier 81

Other designations
- UGC 5336, [B93] 17, DDO 66, 2E 0953.7+6918, 2E 2199, 1ES 0953+69.3, HIJASS J0957+69A, Holmberg IX, [IW2001] H42, [IW2001] P63, K68 62, LEDA 28757, Mailyan 48, MCG+12-10-012, [MI94] Im 62, SPB 118, PGC 28757

Holmberg IX is a dwarf irregular galaxy and a satellite galaxy of M81, located in the constellation of Ursa Major. It is a Magellanic-type galaxy, similar to the Small Magellanic Cloud, neighbour galaxy to the Milky Way galaxy. The galaxy is named after Erik Holmberg who first described it, though it was originally discovered by Sidney van den Bergh in 1959. Based on the observed age distribution of stars it contains, 20% of its stellar mass formed within the last 200 Myr, making it the youngest nearby galaxy. It is also home to one of two yellow supergiant eclipsing binary systems designated Holmberg IX V1.
