= M81 Group =

Galaxy group in Ursa Major and Camelopardalis

Observation data (Epoch J2000)
- Constellation: Ursa Major/Camelopardalis
- Brightest member: M81 (pictured)
- Number of galaxies: 34

Other designations
- NGC 3031 Group

The M81 Group is a galaxy group in the constellations Ursa Major and Camelopardalis that includes the galaxies Messier 81 and Messier 82, as well as several other galaxies with high apparent brightnesses. The approximate center of the group is located at a distance of 3.6 Mpc, making it one of the nearest groups to the Local Group. The group is estimated to have a total mass of (1.03 ± 0.17)×10^{12}M_{☉}. The M81 Group, the Local Group, and other nearby groups all lie within the Virgo Supercluster (i.e. the Local Supercluster), within Coma–Sculptor Cloud.

== Members ==
The table below lists galaxies that have been identified as associated with the M81 Group by I. D. Karachentsev.

Members of the M81 Group
Name	Type	R.A. (J2000)	Dec. (J2000)	Redshift (km/s)	Apparent Magnitude
Arp's Loop		09^{h} 57^{m} 32.6^{s}	+69° 17′ 00″	99	16.1
DDO 78	Im	10^{h} 26^{m} 27.4^{s}	+67° 39′ 16″	55 ± 10	15.8
F8D1	dE	09^{h} 44^{m} 47.1^{s}	+67° 26′ 19″		13.9
FM1	dSph	09^{h} 45^{m} 10.0^{s}	+68° 45′ 54″		17.5
HIJASS J1021+6842		10^{h} 21^{m} 00.0^{s}	+68° 42′ 00″	46	20
HS 117	I	10^{h} 21^{m} 25.2^{s}	+71° 06′ 51″	−37	16.5
Holmberg I	IAB(s)m	09^{h} 40^{m} 32.3^{s}	+71° 10′ 56″	139 ± 0	13.0
Holmberg II	Im	08^{h} 19^{m} 05.0^{s}	+70° 43′ 12″	142 ± 1	11.1
Holmberg IX	Im	09^{h} 57^{m} 32.0^{s}	+69° 02′ 45″	46 ± 6	14.3
IC 2574	SAB(s)m	10^{h} 28^{m} 23.5^{s}	+68° 24′ 44″	57 ± 2	13.2
IKN (galaxy)		10^{h} 08^{m} 05.9^{s}	+68° 23′ 57″		17.0
KKH 57	dSph	10^{h} 00^{m} 16.0^{s}	+63° 11′ 06″		18.5
Messier 81	SA(s)ab	09^{h} 55^{m} 33.2^{s}	+69° 03′ 55″	−34 ± 4	6.9
Messier 81 Dwarf A	I	08^{h} 23^{m} 56.0^{s}	+71° 01′ 45″	113 ± 0	16.5
Messier 82	I0	09^{h} 55^{m} 52^{s}	+69° 40′ 47″	203 ± 4	9.3
NGC 2366	IB(s)m	07^{h} 28^{m} 54.7^{s}	+69° 12′ 57″	80 ± 1	11.4
NGC 2403	SAB(s)cd	07^{h} 36^{m} 51.4^{s}	+65° 36′ 09″	131 ± 3	8.9
NGC 2976	SAc pec	09^{h} 47^{m} 15.5^{s}	+67° 54′ 59″	3 ± 5	10.8
NGC 3077	I0 pec	10^{h} 03^{m} 19.1^{s}	+68° 44′ 02″	14 ± 4	10.6
NGC 4236	SB(s)dm	12^{h} 16^{m} 42^{s}	+69° 27′ 45″	0 ± 4	10.1
PGC 28529	Im	09^{h} 53^{m} 48.5^{s}	+68° 58′ 08″	−40	17.1
PGC 28731	dE	09^{h} 57^{m} 03.1^{s}	+68° 35′ 31″	−135 ± 30	15.6
PGC 29231	dE	10^{h} 04^{m} 41.1^{s}	+68° 15′ 22″		16.7
PGC 31286	dSph	10^{h} 34^{m} 29.8^{s}	+66° 00′ 30″		16.7
PGC 32667	Im	10^{h} 52^{m} 57.1^{s}	+69° 32′ 58″	116 ± 1	14.9
UGC 4459	Im	08^{h} 34^{m} 07.2^{s}	+66° 10′ 54″	20 ± 0	14.5
UGC 4483		08^{h} 37^{m} 03.0^{s}	+69° 46′ 31″	156 ± 0	15.1
UGC 5428	Im	10^{h} 05^{m} 06.4^{s}	+66° 33′ 32″	−129 ± 0	18
UGC 5442	Im	10^{h} 07^{m} 01.9^{s}	+67° 49′ 39″	−18 ± 14	18
UGC 5692	Sm	10^{h} 30^{m} 35.0^{s}	+70° 37′ 07.2″	56 ± 3	13.5
UGC 6456	Pec	11^{h} 27^{m} 59.9^{s}	+78° 59′ 39″	−103 ± 0	14.5
UGC 7242	Scd	12^{h} 14^{m} 08.4^{s}	+66° 05′ 41″	68 ± 2	14.6
UGC 8201	Im	13^{h} 06^{m} 24.9^{s}	+67° 42′ 25″	31 ± 0	12.8
UGCA 133	dSph	07^{h} 34^{m} 11.4^{s}	+66° 53′ 10″		15.6

Note that the object names used in the above table differ from the names used by Karachentsev. NGC, IC, UGC, and PGC numbers have been used in many cases to allow for easier referencing.

== Interactions within the group ==
Messier 81, Messier 82, and NGC 3077 are all strongly interacting with each other. Observations of the 21-centimeter hydrogen line indicate how the galaxies are connected. The gravitational interactions have stripped some hydrogen gas away from all three galaxies, leading to the formation of filamentary gas structures within the group. Bridges of neutral hydrogen have been shown to connect M81 with M82 and NGC 3077. Moreover, the interactions have also caused some interstellar gas to fall into the centers of Messier 82 and NGC 3077, which has led to strong starburst activity (or the formation of many stars) within the centers of these two galaxies. Computer simulations of tidal interactions have been used to show how the current structure of the group could have been created.

== Gallery ==
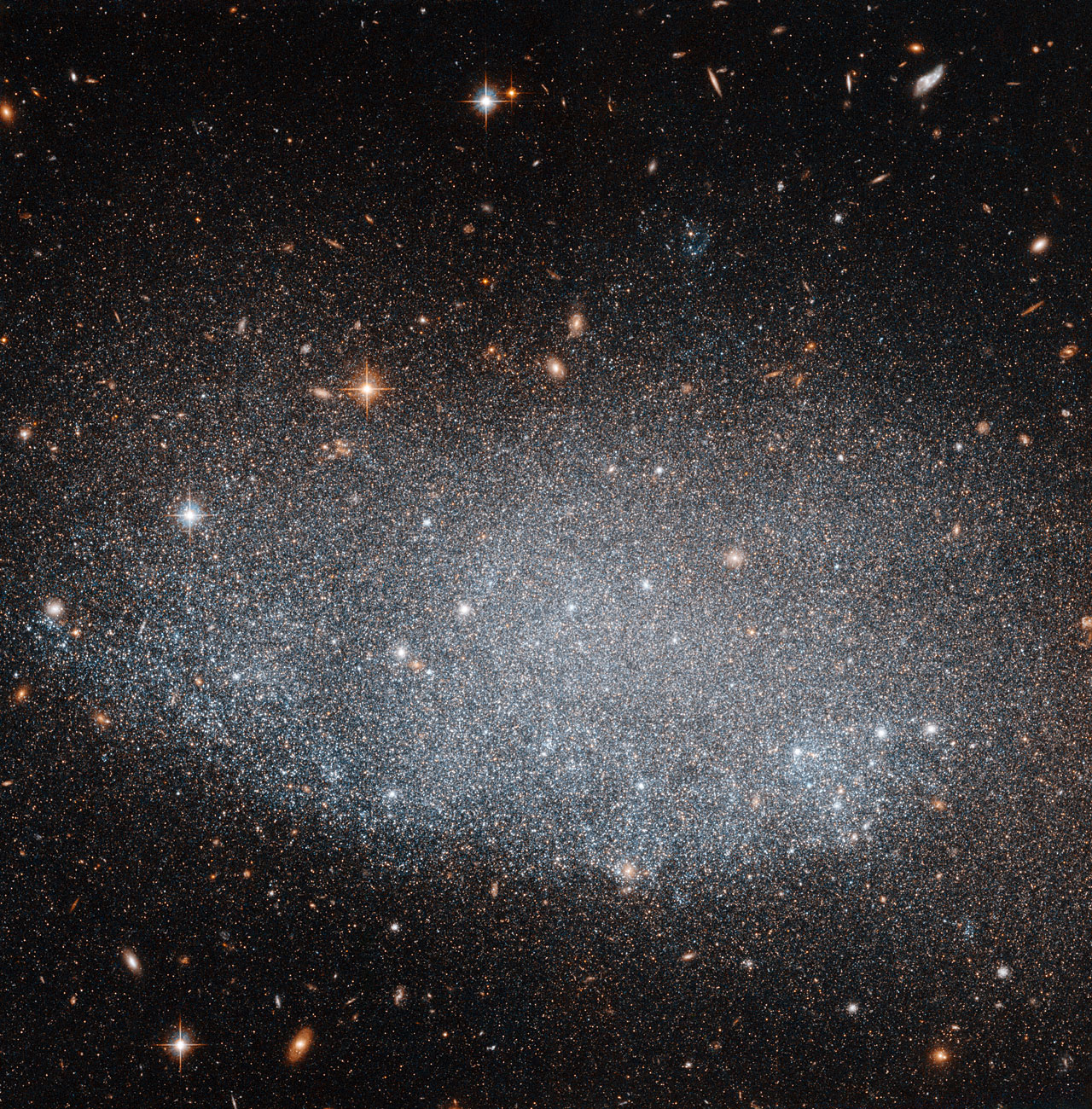
Galaxy UGC 8201 is a dwarf irregular galaxy member of the M81 galaxy group.

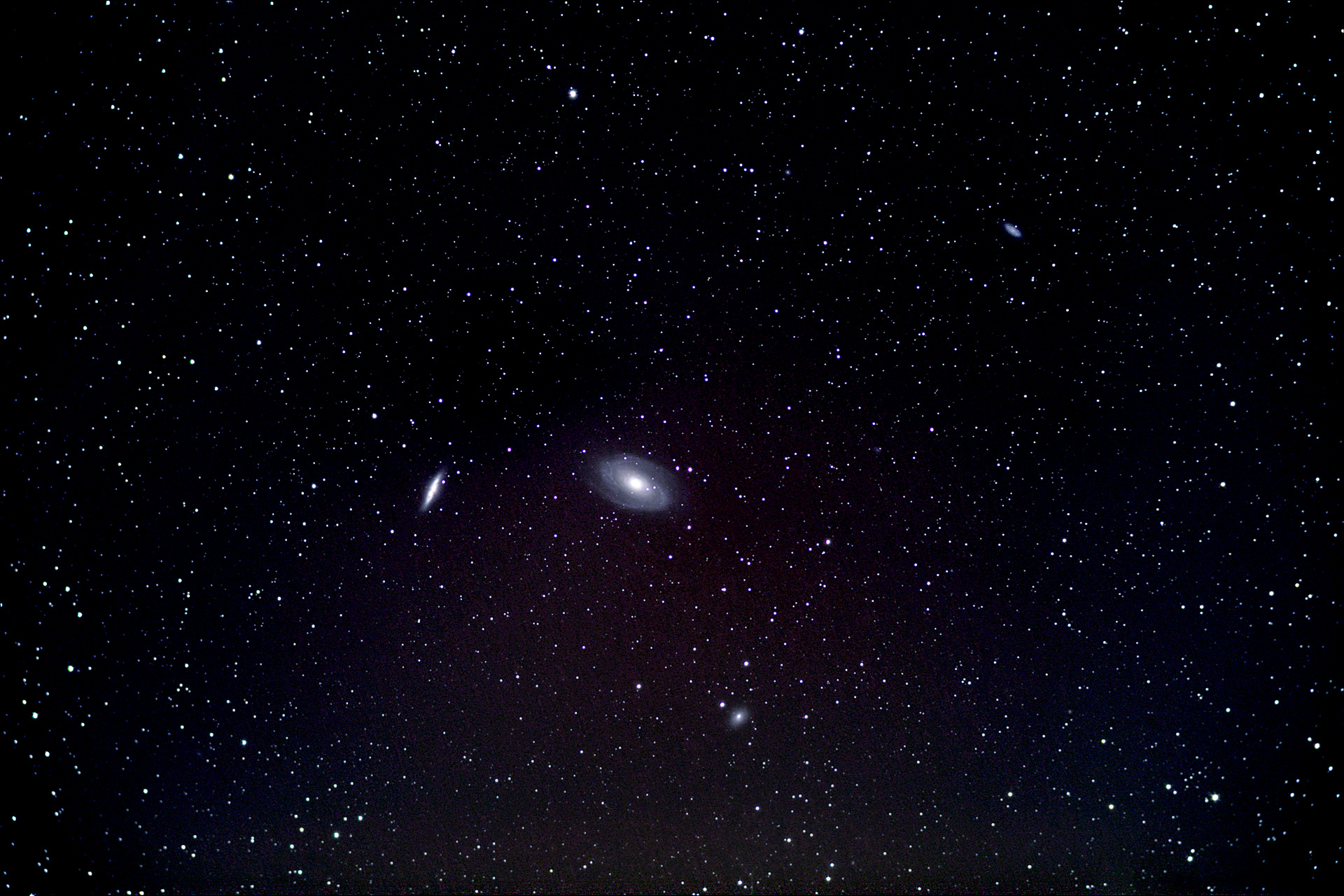
Amateur picture Messier 81 + 82 and NGC 3077 all of the M81 group, 33 frames stacked of 1 minute each.

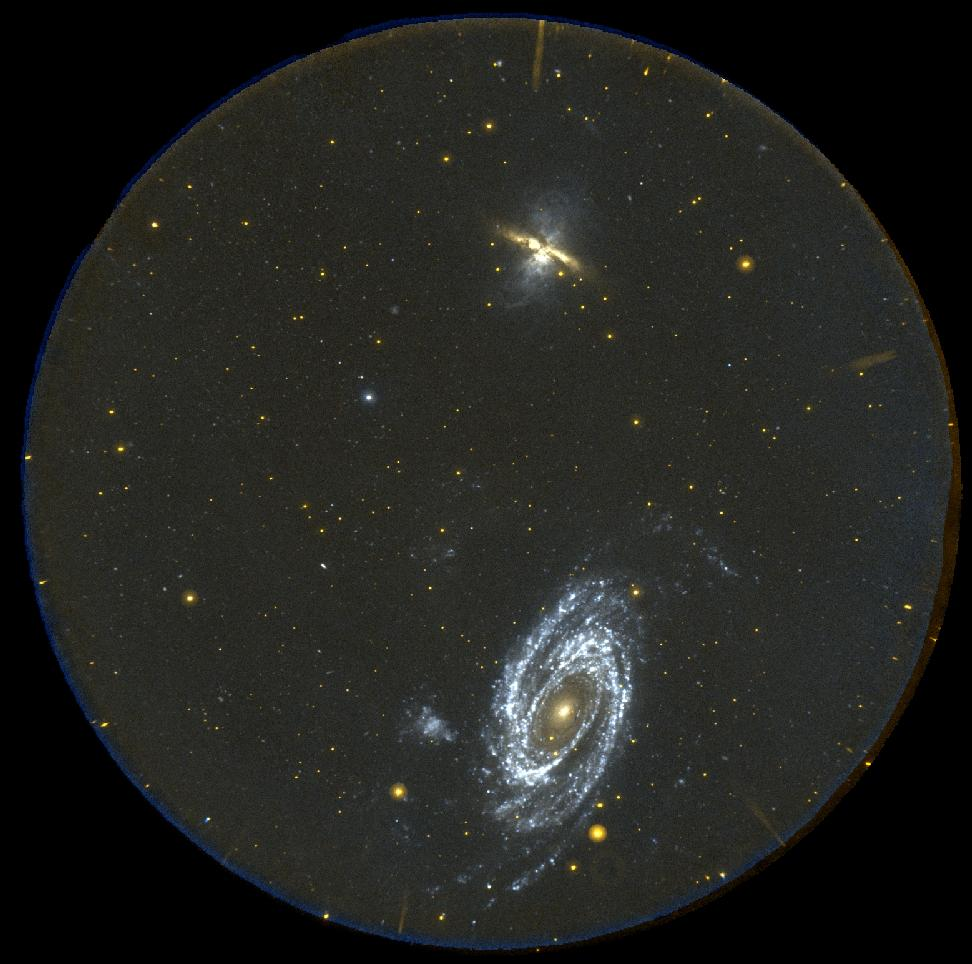
The spiral galaxies Messier 81 and 82 and the dwarf galaxy Holmberg IX from GALEX

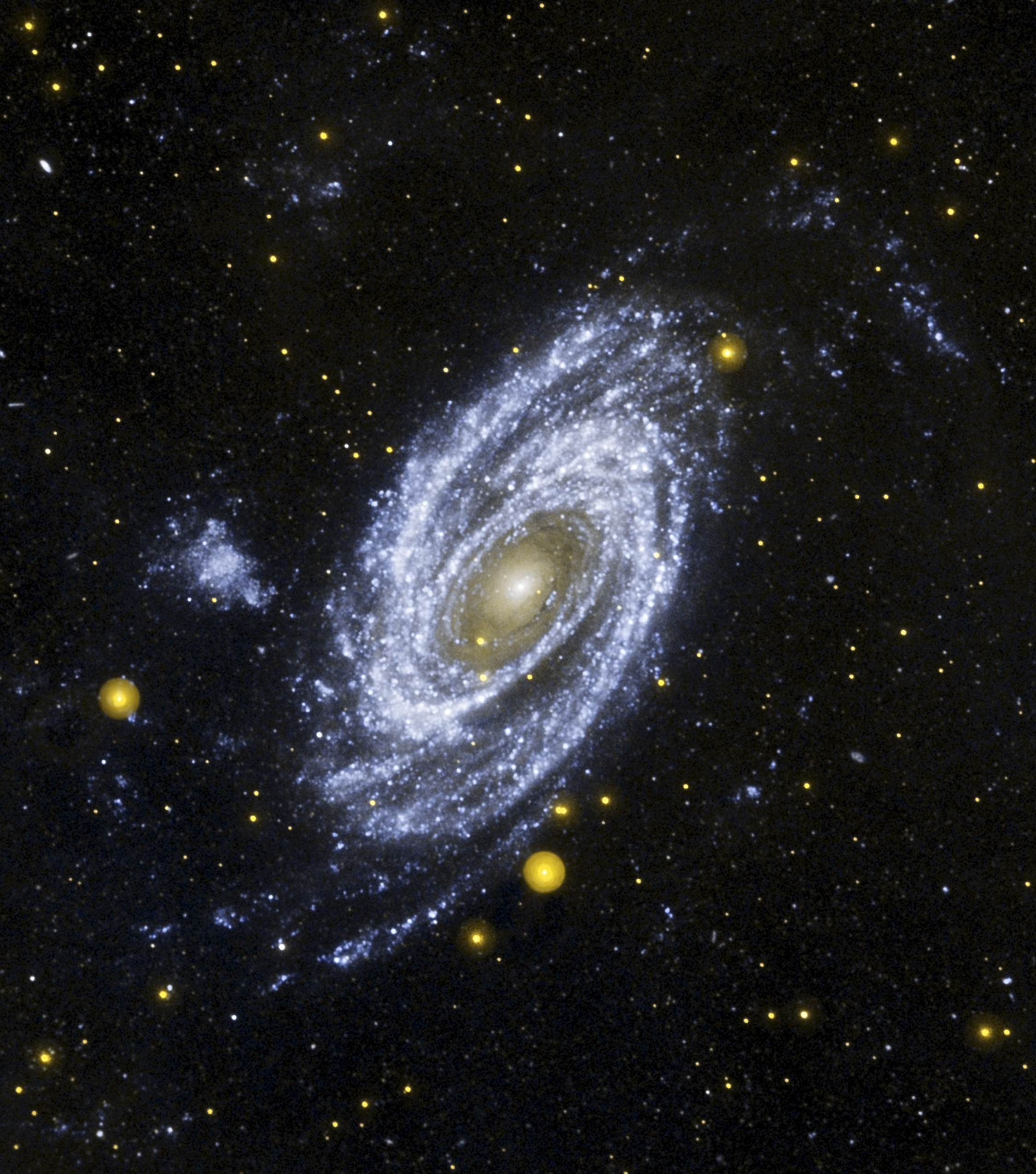
Close up view of Messier 81 from GALEX

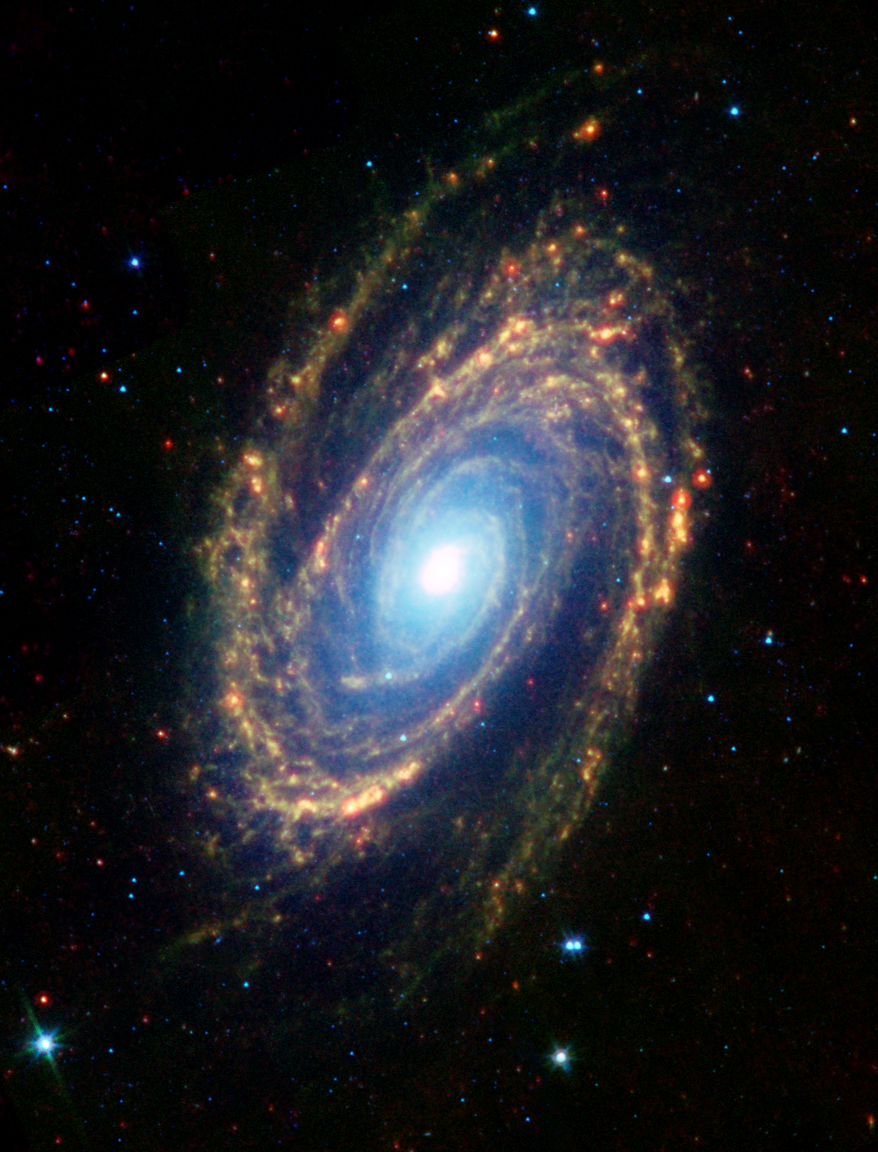
The spiral galaxy Messier 81 from Spitzer Space Telescope

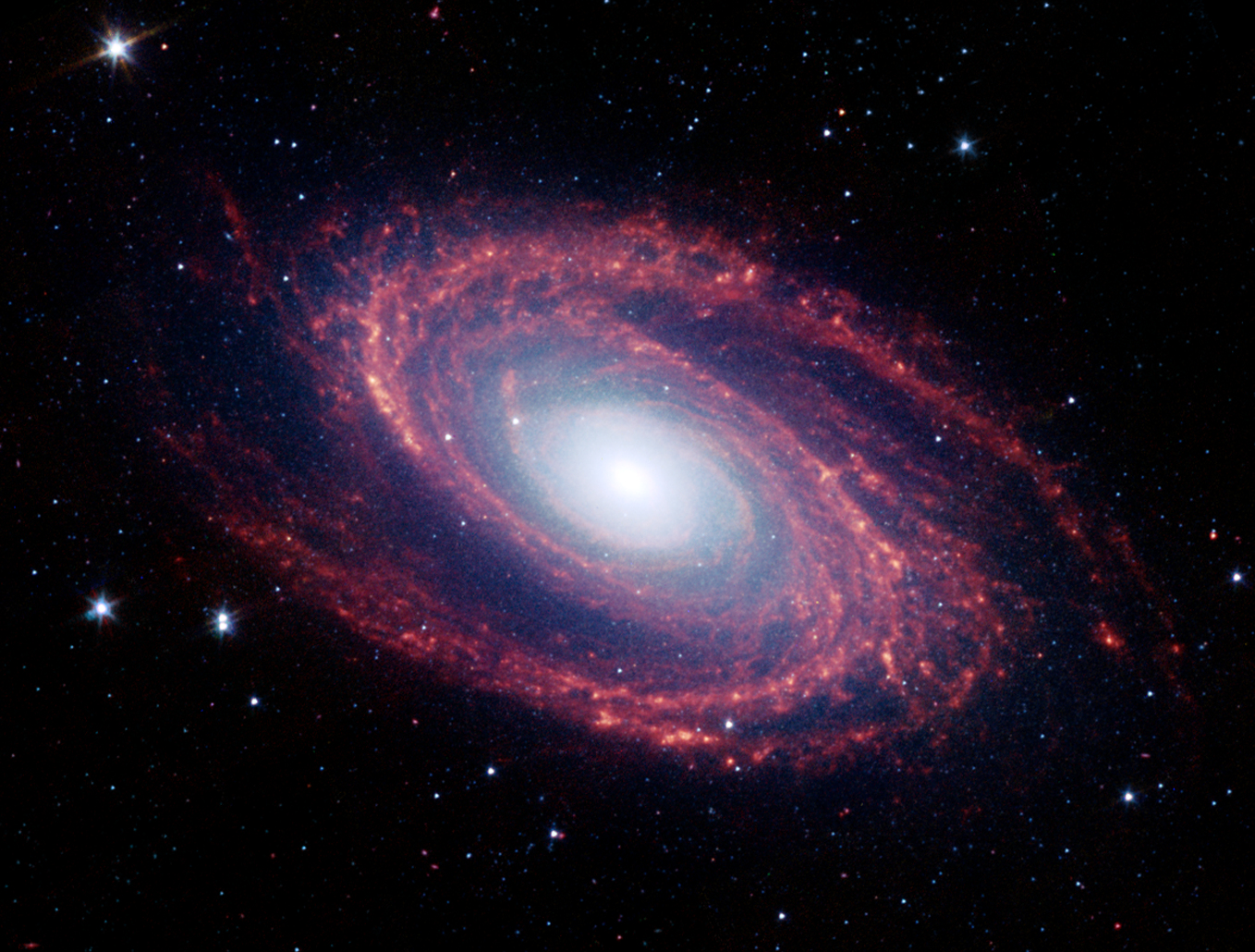
The spiral galaxy Messier 81 from Spitzer Space Telescope

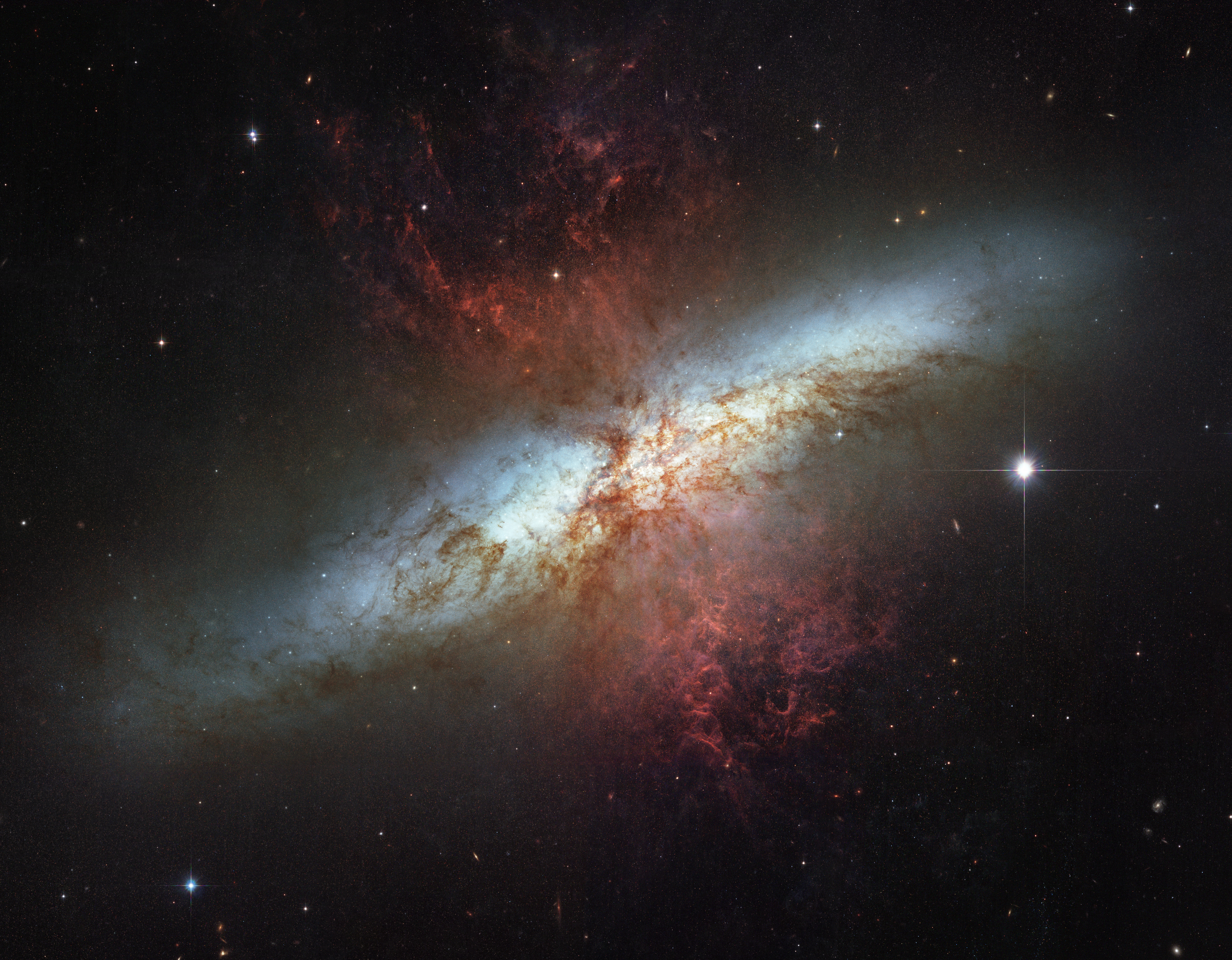
Starburst galaxy Messier 82 from Hubble Space Telescope

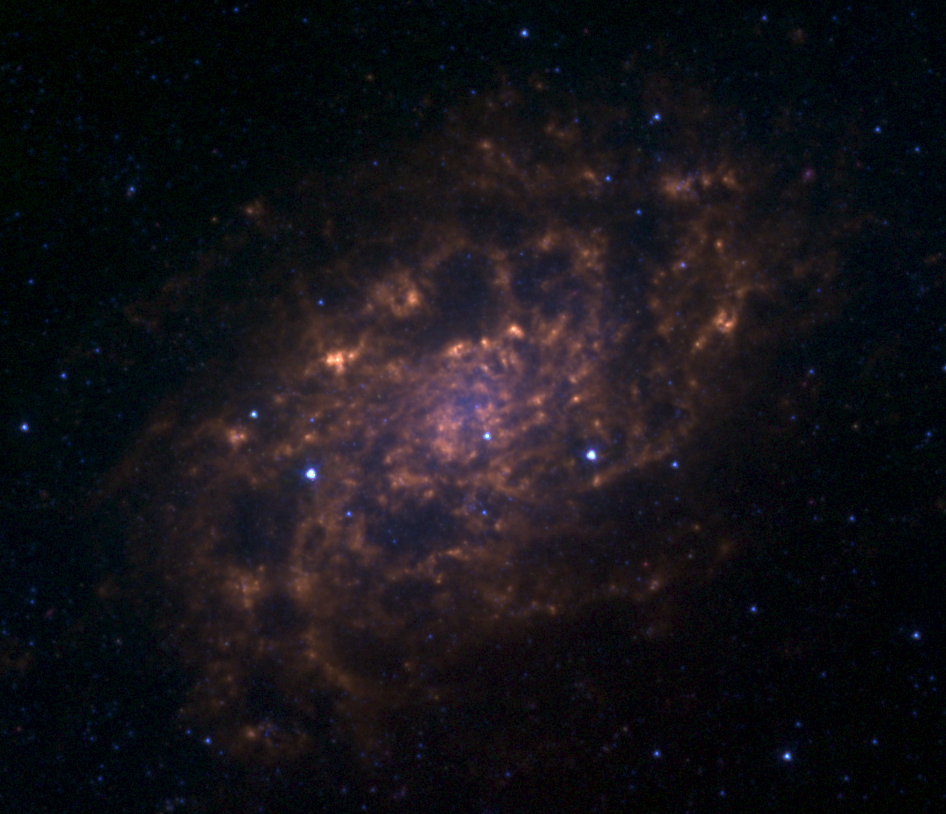
NGC 2403 in mid-infrared view, combining the 3.6, 5.8 and 8.0 μm bands of the Spitzer Space Telescope

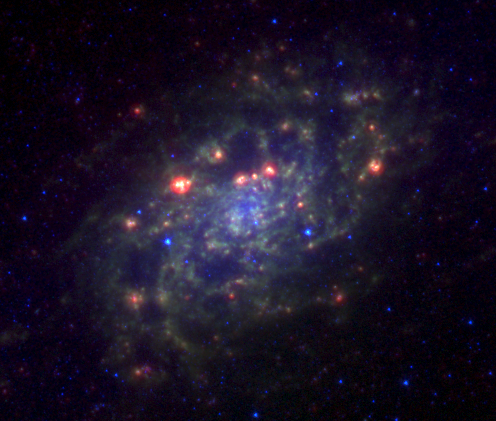
NGC 2403 in Mid-infrared view, combining the 3.6, 8.0 and 24 μm bands of the Spitzer Space Telescope

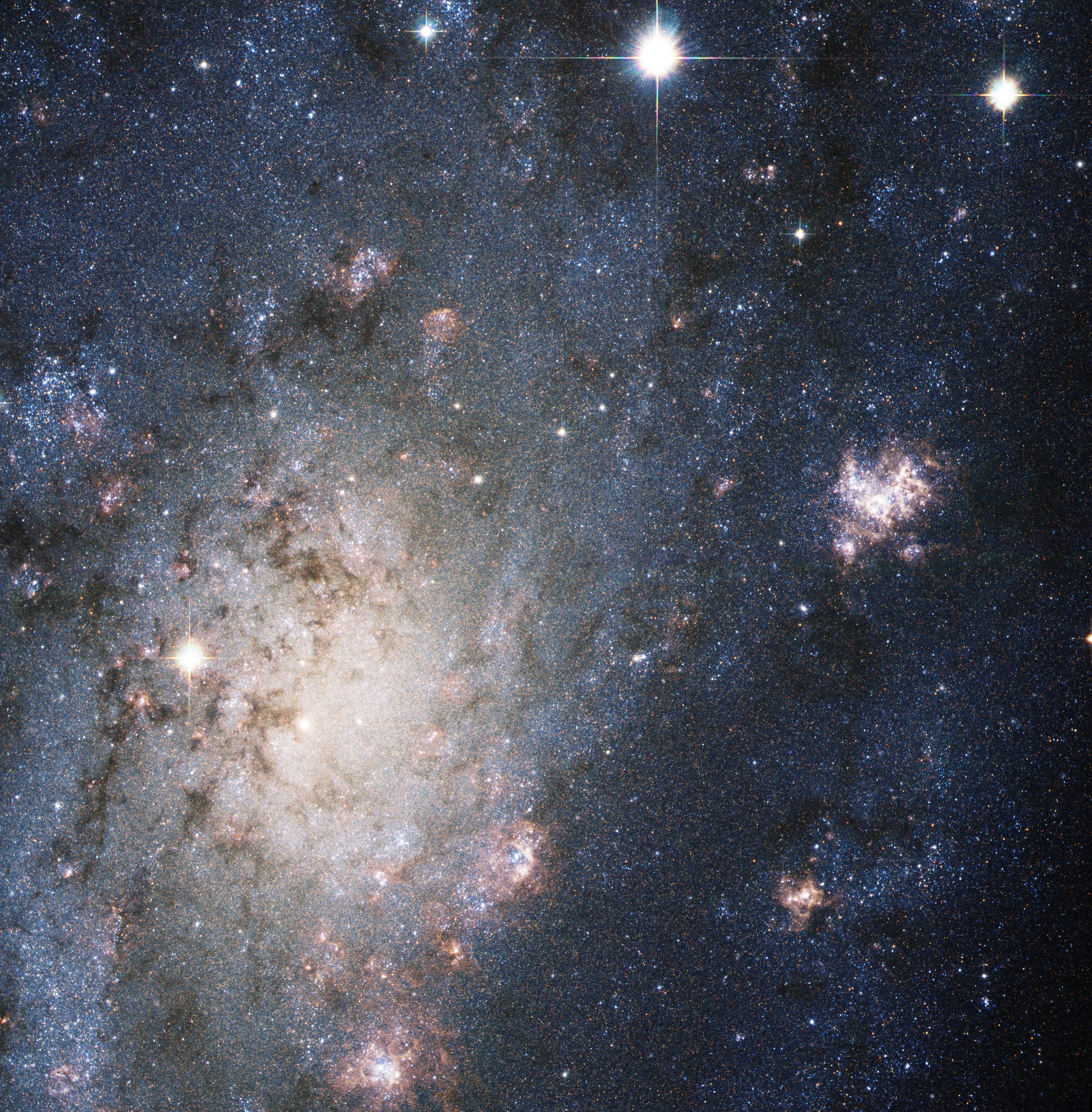
NGC 2403 from Hubble Space Telescope

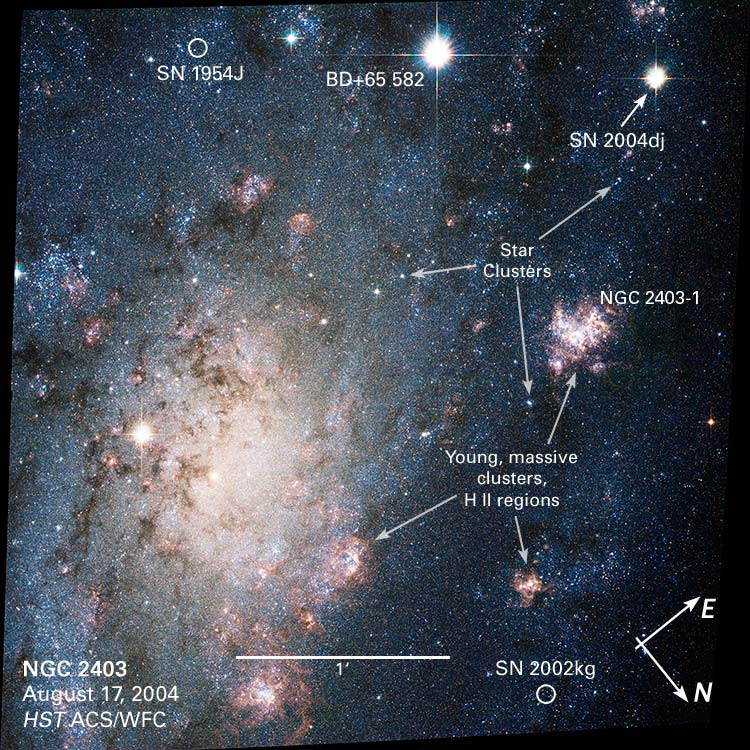
NGC 2403 from Hubble Space Telescope illustrated

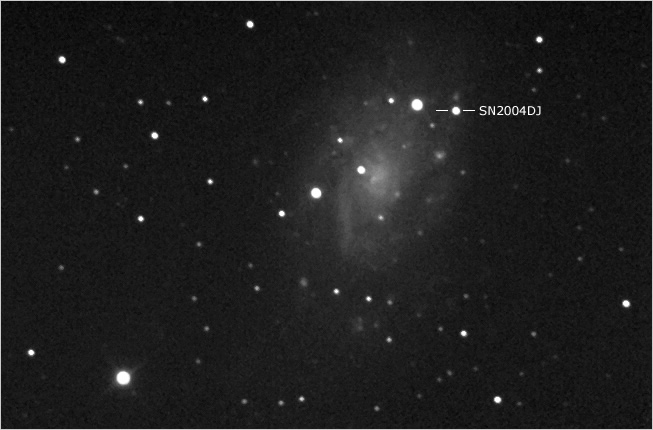
Supernova SN2004DJ in the spiral galaxy NGC 2403

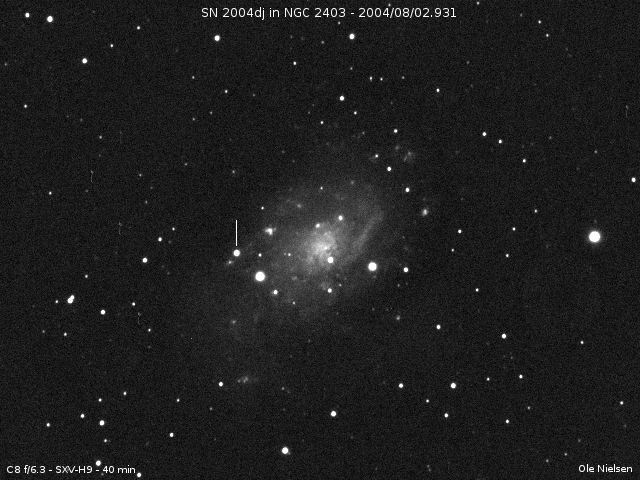
Supernova 2004dj in NGC 2403

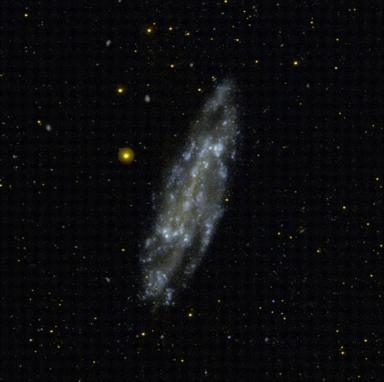
NGC 4236 from GALEX

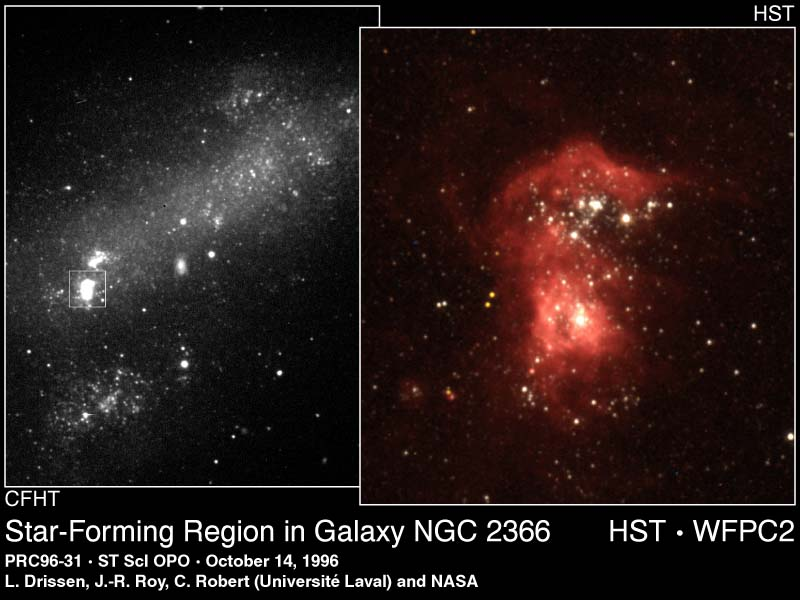
NGC 2366 from Hubble Space Telescope

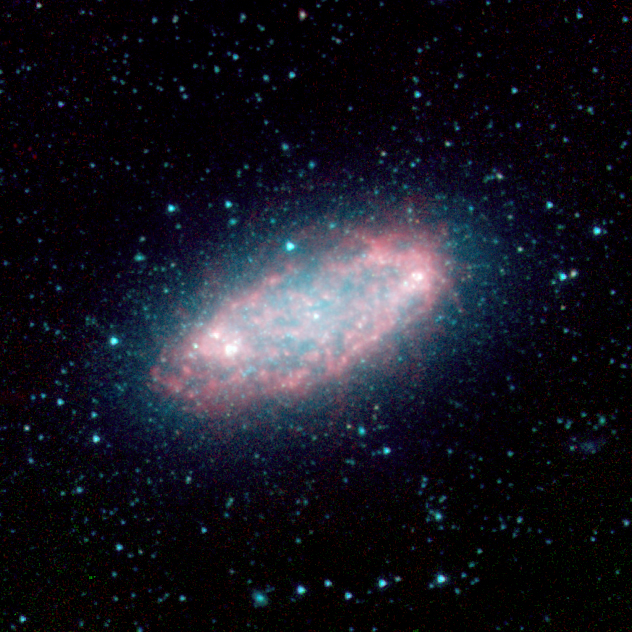
Galaxy NGC 2976 from Spitzer Space Telescope in infrared

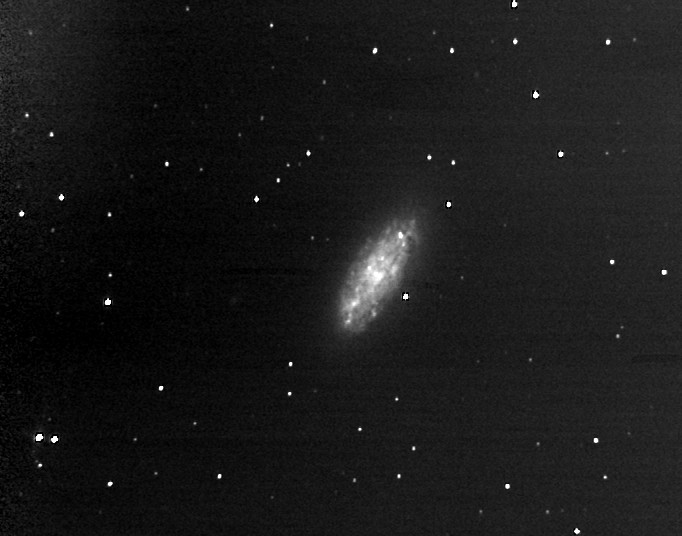
Galaxy NGC 2976 from an amateur Astronomer

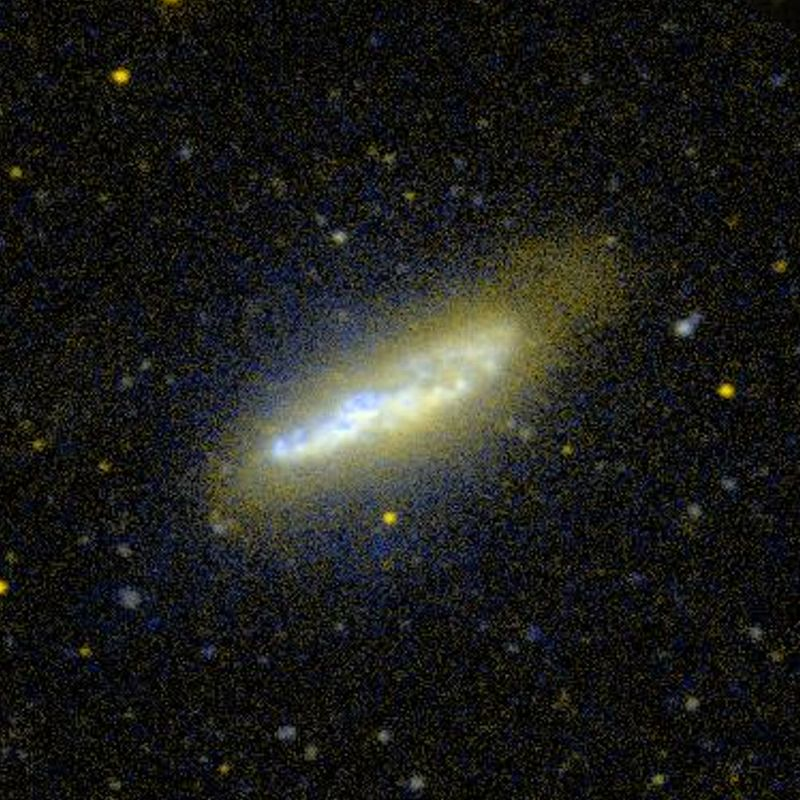
Galaxy NGC 4605 from GALEX

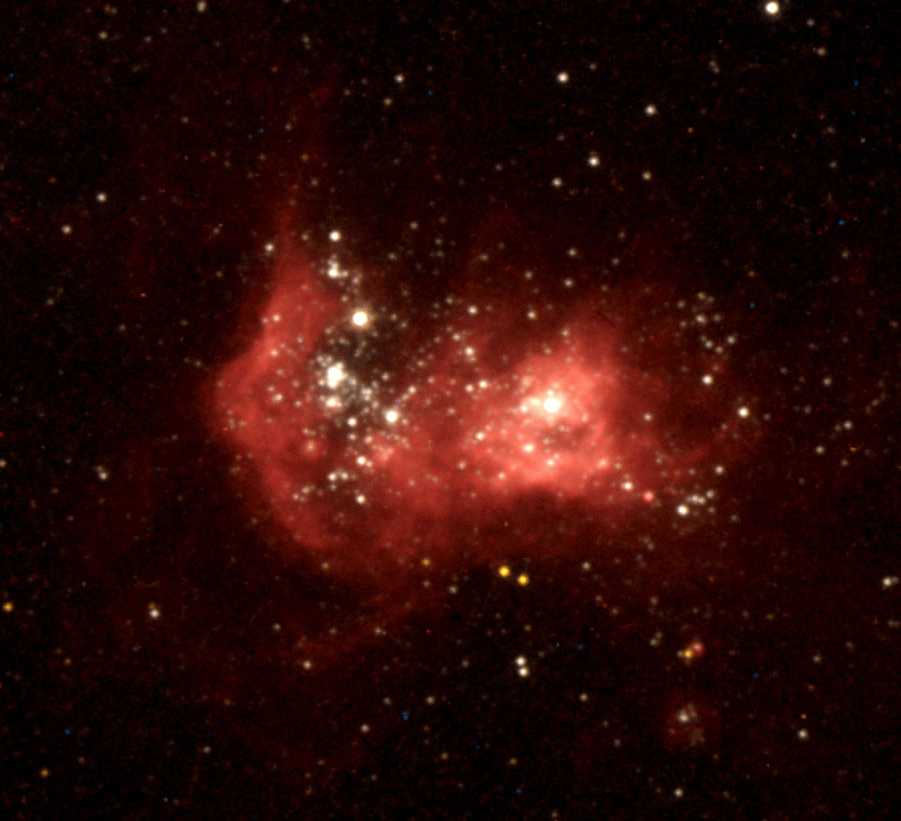
NGC 2363 from Hubble Space Telescope

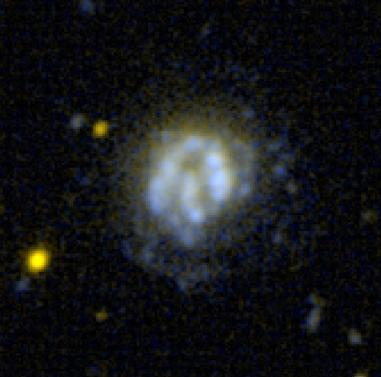
NGC 2537 from GALEX

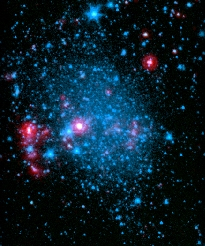
Holmberg II from Spitzer Space Telescope in infrared

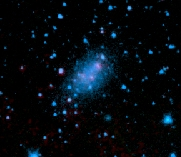
UGC 5423 / M81 dwarf B from Spitzer Space Telescope in infrared

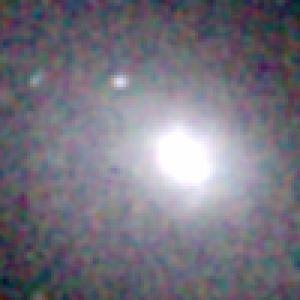
NGC 3077 from 2MASS

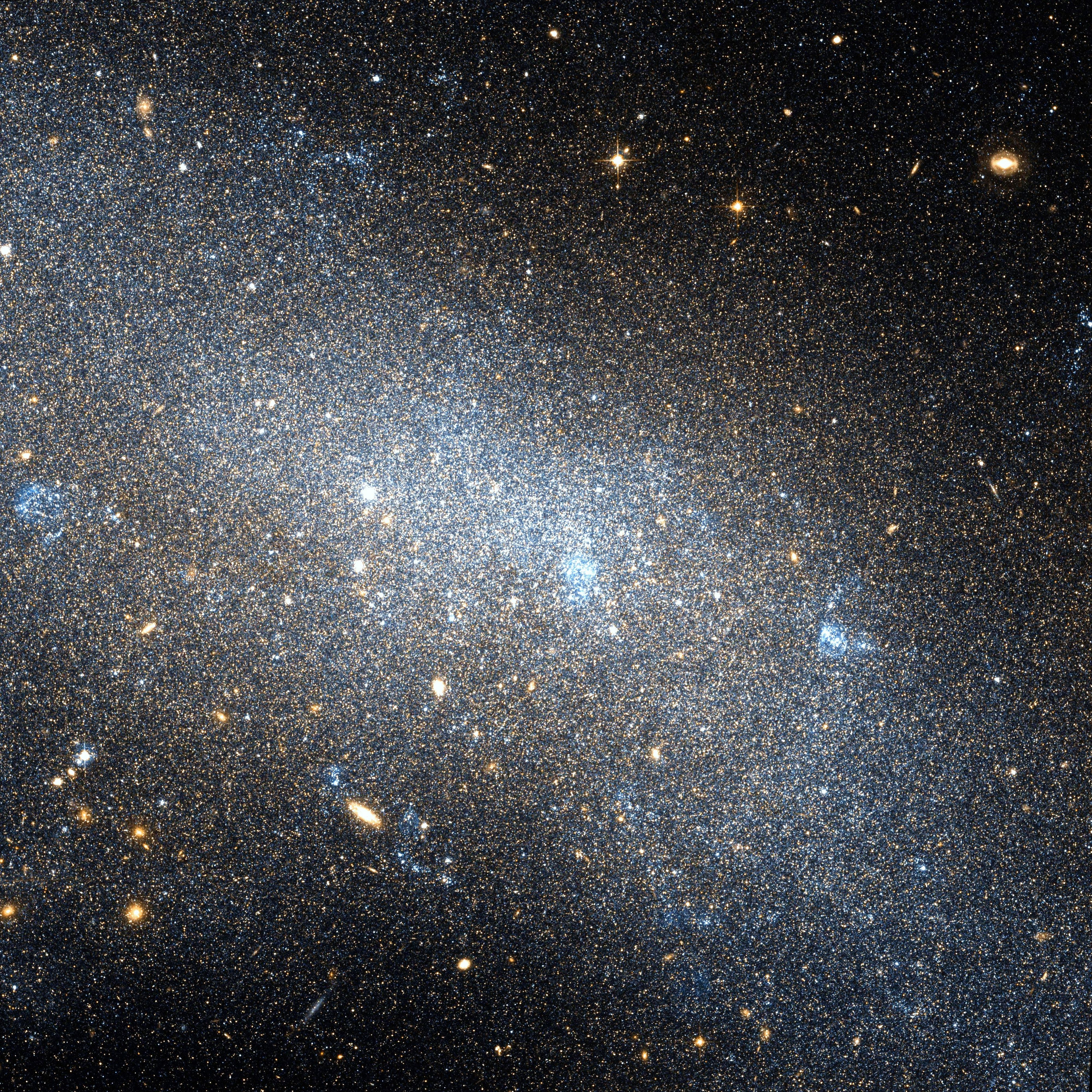
IC 2574

== See also ==
- UGC 5497
