= Messier 82 =

Galaxy in the constellation Ursa Major

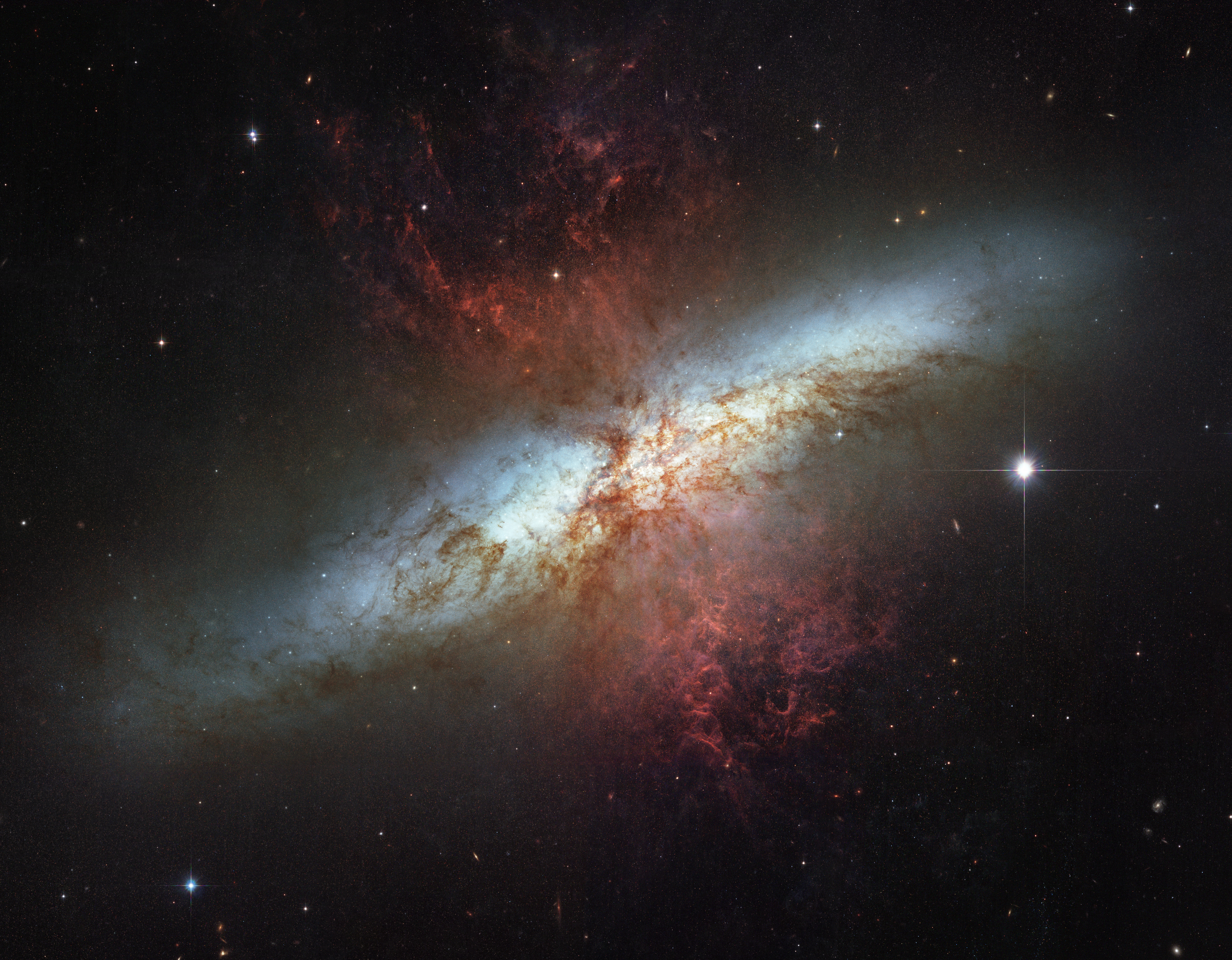
- A mosaic image taken by the Hubble Space Telescope of Messier 82, combining exposures taken with four colored filters that capture starlight from visible and infrared wavelengths as well as the light from the glowing hydrogen filaments

Observation data (J2000 epoch)
- Constellation: Ursa Major
- Right ascension: 09^{h} 55^{m} 52.9200^{s}
- Declination: +69° 40′ 46.140″
- Redshift: 0.000897±0.000007
- Heliocentric radial velocity: 269±2 km/s
- Distance: 11.4–12.4 Mly (3.5–3.8 Mpc)
- Apparent magnitude (V): 8.41

Characteristics
- Type: I0
- Size: 12.52 kiloparsecs (40,800 light-years) (diameter; 25.0 mag/arcsec^{2} B-band isophote)
- Apparent size (V): 11.2′ × 4.3′
- Notable features: Edge-on starburst galaxy

Other designations
- Cigar Galaxy, 3C 231, IRAS 09517+6954, NGC 3034, Arp 337, UGC 5322, MCG +12-10-011, PGC 28655, CGCG 333-008

M82 Galaxy

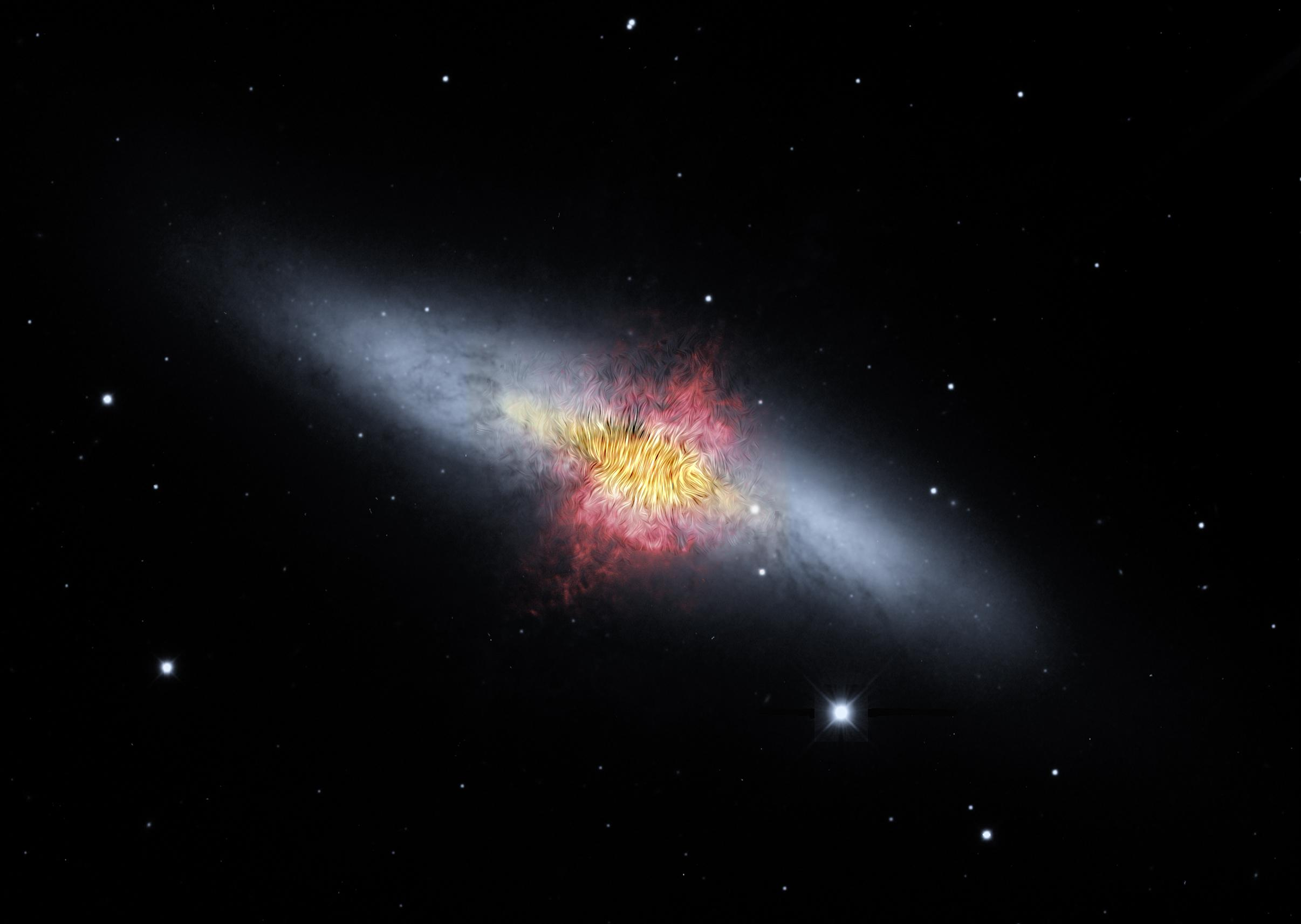
M82 magnetic field

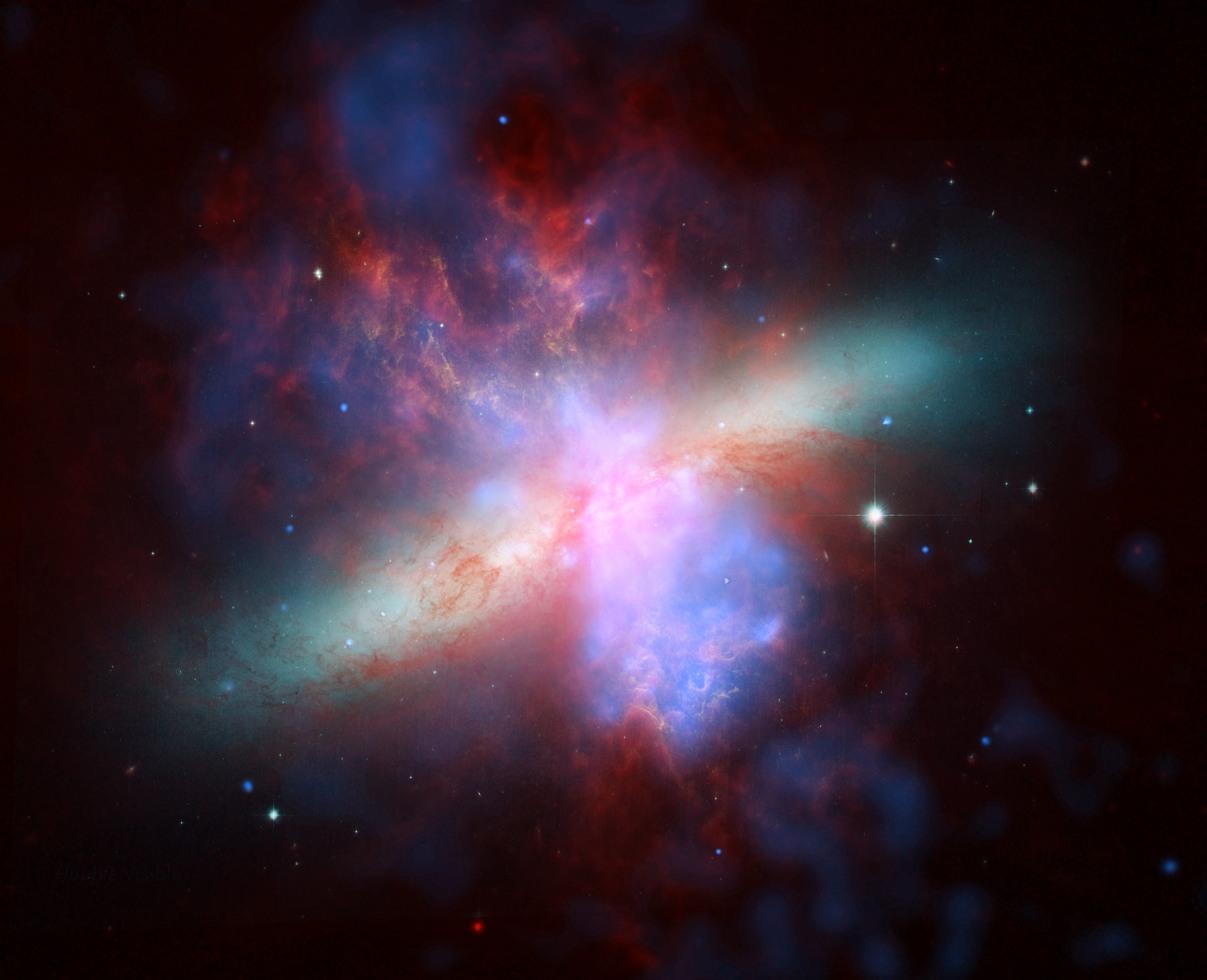
Composite image – HST (vis); Spitzer (ir); Chandra (x-ray)

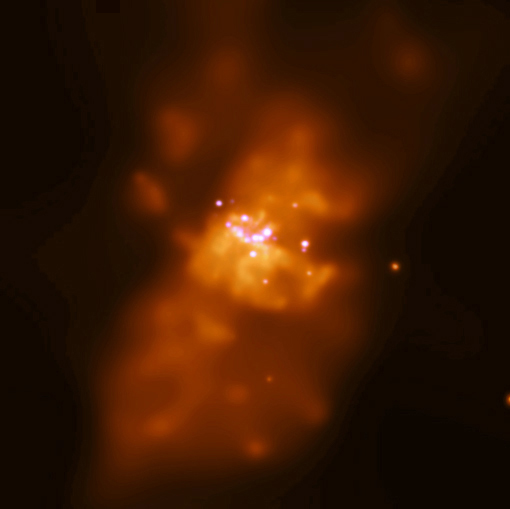
Chandra X-ray observatory image of the galaxy

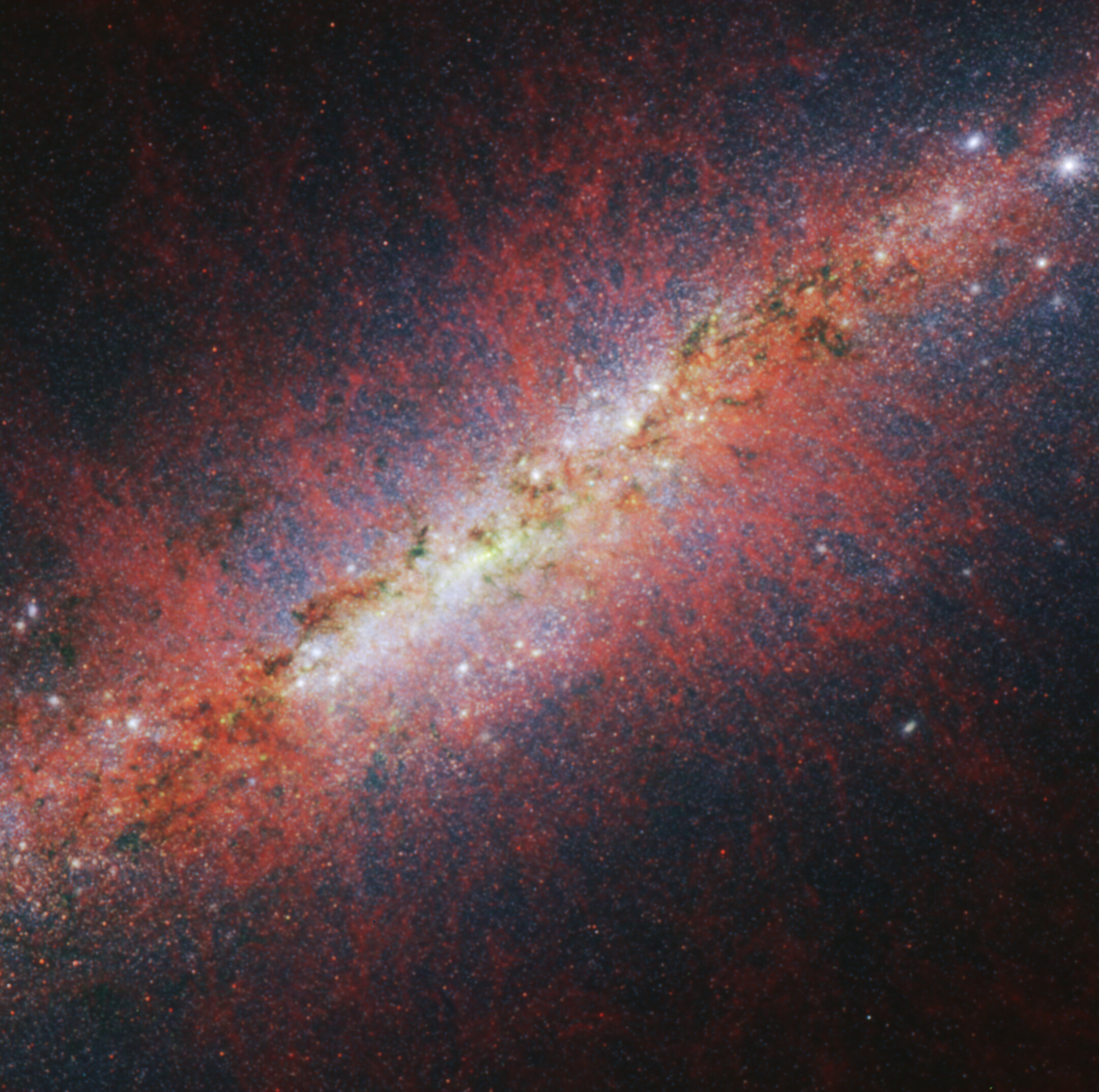
James Webb NIRCam image of the center of M82

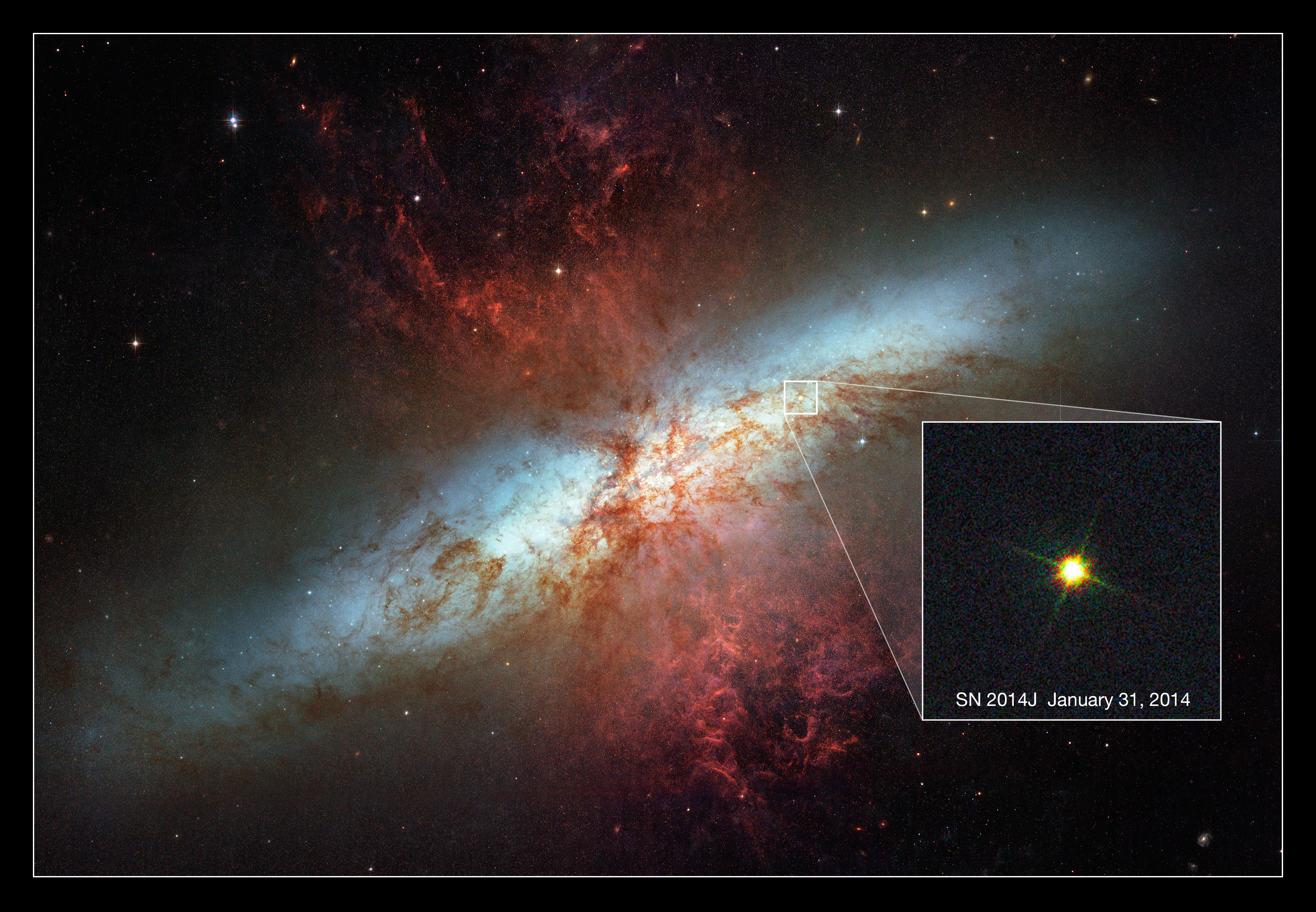
Hubble views new supernova in Messier 82

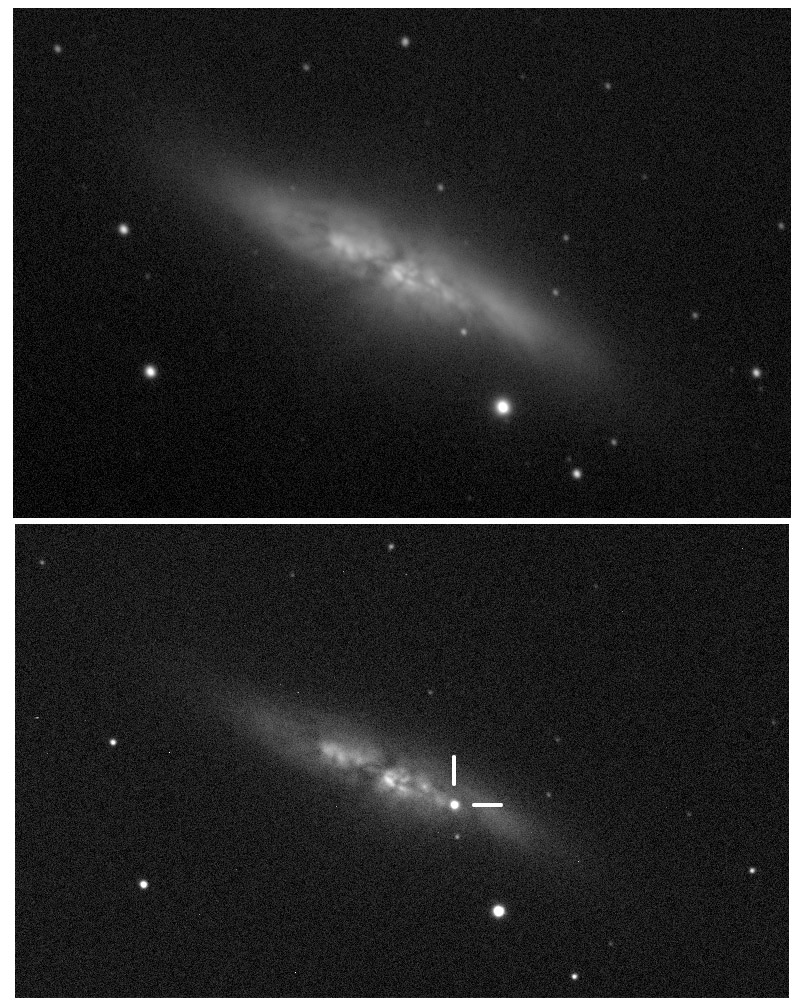
M82 – December 2013; supernova – January 2014 (bottom)

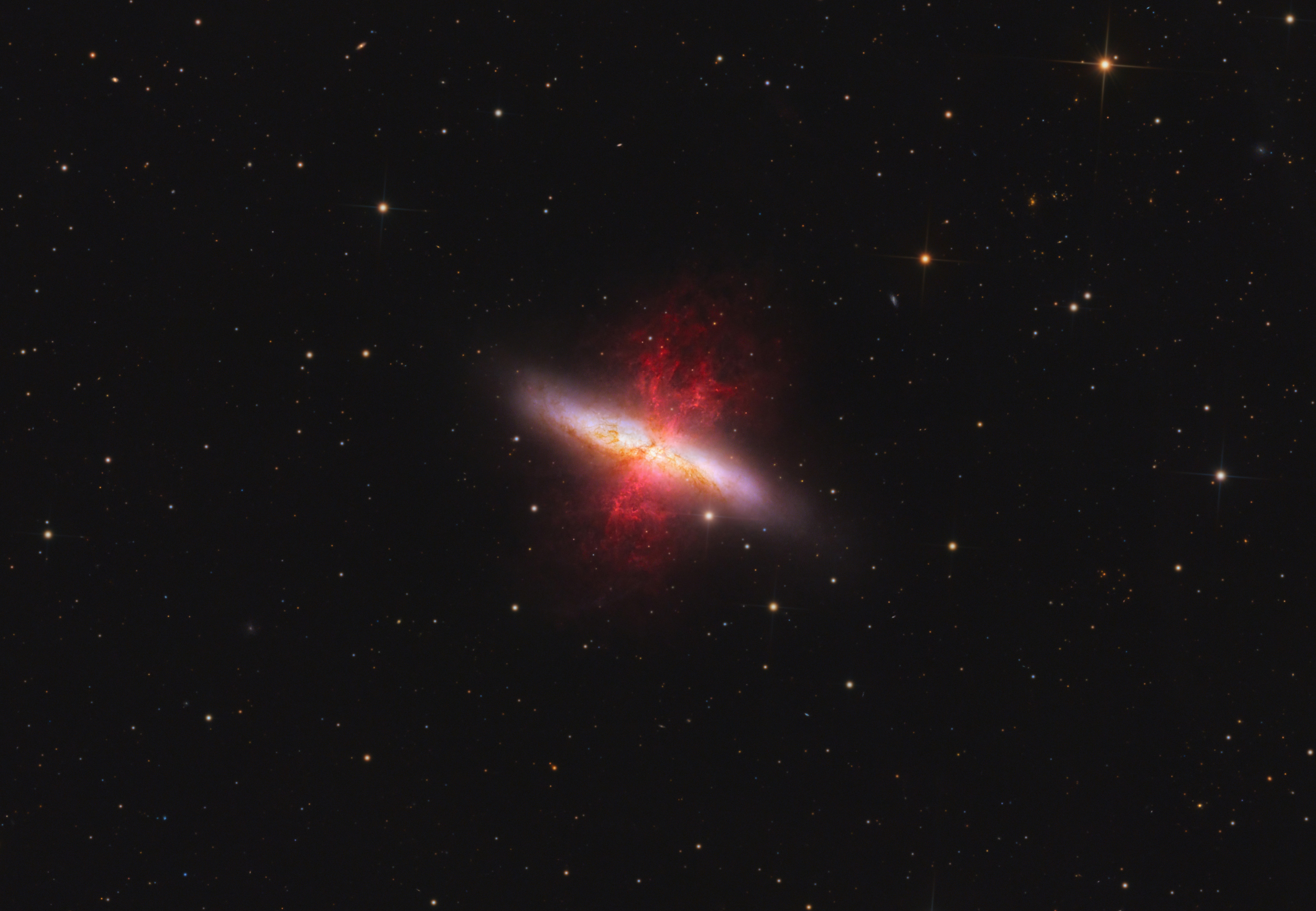
Messier 82 photographed by amateur astrophotographer Radu Marinescu using a 10" Newtonian telescope, with a high emphasis on the Hydrogen-alpha star-burst areas.

Messier 82 (also known as NGC 3034, Cigar Galaxy or M82) is a starburst galaxy approximately 12 million light-years away in the constellation Ursa Major. It is the second-largest member of the M81 Group, with the D_{25} isophotal diameter of 12.52 kiloparsecs (40,800 light-years). It is about five times more luminous than the Milky Way and its central region is about one hundred times more luminous. The starburst activity is thought to have been triggered by interaction with neighboring galaxy M81(NGC 3031). As one of the closest starburst galaxies to Earth, M82 is the prototypical example of this galaxy type. (Note: The irregular galaxy IC 10 in the Local Group is sometimes classified as a starburst galaxy, and hence is the closest such galaxy to Earth.) SN 2014J, a Type Ia supernova, was discovered in the galaxy on 21 January 2014. In 2014, in studying M82, scientists discovered the brightest pulsar yet known, designated M82 X-2.

In November 2023, a gamma-ray burst was observed in M82, which was determined to have come from a magnetar, the first such event detected outside the Milky Way (and only the fourth such event ever detected).

== Discovery ==
M82, with M81, was discovered by Johann Elert Bode in 1774; he described it as a "nebulous patch", this one about 3/4 degree away from the other, "very pale and of elongated shape". In 1779, Pierre Méchain independently rediscovered both objects and reported them to Charles Messier, who added them to his catalog.

== Structure ==
M82 was believed to be an irregular galaxy. In 2005, however, two symmetric spiral arms were discovered in near-infrared (NIR) images of M82. The arms were detected by subtracting an axisymmetric exponential disk from the NIR images. Even though the arms were detected in NIR images, they are bluer than the disk. The arms had been missed due to M82's high disk surface brightness, the nearly edge-on view of this galaxy (~80°), and obscuration by a complex network of dusty filaments in its optical images. These arms emanate from the ends of the NIR bar and can be followed for the length of three disc scales. Assuming that the northern part of M82 is nearer to us, as most of the literature does, the observed sense of rotation implies trailing arms.

=== Starburst region ===
In 2005, the Hubble Space Telescope revealed 197 young massive clusters in the starburst core. The average mass of these clusters is around 200,000 solar masses, hence the starburst core is a very energetic and high-density environment. Throughout the galaxy's center, young stars are being born 10 times faster than they are inside the entire Milky Way Galaxy.

In the core of M82, the active starburst region spans a diameter of 500 pc. Four high surface brightness regions or clumps (designated A, C, D, and E) are detectable in this region at visible wavelengths. These clumps correspond to known sources at X-ray, infrared, and radio frequencies. Consequently, they are thought to be the least obscured starburst clusters from our vantage point. M82's unique bipolar outflow (or 'superwind') appears to be concentrated on clumps A and C, and is fueled by energy released by supernovae within the clumps which occur at a rate of about one every ten years.

The Chandra X-ray Observatory detected fluctuating X-ray emissions about 600 light-years from the center of M82. Astronomers have postulated that this comes from the first known intermediate-mass black hole, of roughly 200 to 5000 solar masses. M82, like most galaxies, hosts a supermassive black hole at its center. This one has mass of approximately 3 × 10^{7} solar masses, as measured from stellar dynamics.

=== Unknown object ===
In April 2010, radio astronomers working at the Jodrell Bank Observatory of the University of Manchester in the UK reported an object in M82 that had started sending out radio waves, and whose emission did not look like anything seen anywhere in the universe before.

There have been several theories about the nature of this object, but currently no theory entirely fits the observed data. It has been suggested that the object could be an unusual "micro quasar", having very high radio luminosity yet low X-ray luminosity, and being fairly stable, it could be an analogue of the low X-ray luminosity galactic microquasar SS 433. However, all known microquasars produce large quantities of X-rays, whereas the object's X-ray flux is below the measurement threshold. The object is located at several arcseconds from the center of M82 which makes it unlikely to be associated with a supermassive black hole. It has an apparent superluminal motion of four times the speed of light relative to the galaxy center. Apparent superluminal motion is consistent with relativistic jets in massive black holes and does not indicate that the source itself is moving above lightspeed.

== Starbursts ==
M82 is being physically affected by its larger neighbor, the spiral M81. Tidal forces caused by gravity have deformed M82, a process that started about 100 million years ago. This interaction has caused star formation to increase tenfold compared to "normal" galaxies.

M82 has undergone at least one tidal encounter with M81 resulting in a large amount of gas being funneled into the galaxy's core over the last 200 Myr. The most recent such encounter is thought to have happened around 2–5×10^{8} years ago and resulted in a concentrated starburst together with a corresponding marked peak in the cluster age distribution. This starburst ran for up to ~50 Myr at a rate of ~10 M_{☉} per year. Two subsequent starbursts followed, the last (~4–6 Myr ago) of which may have formed the core clusters, both super star clusters (SSCs) and their lighter counterparts.

Stars in M82's disk seem to have been formed in a burst 500 million years ago, leaving its disk littered with hundreds of clusters with properties similar to globular clusters (but younger), and stopped 100 million years ago with no star formation taking place in this galaxy outside the central starburst and, at low levels since 1 billion years ago, on its halo. A suggestion to explain those features is that M82 was previously a low surface brightness galaxy where star formation was triggered due to interactions with its giant neighbor. Ignoring any difference in their respective distances from the Earth, the centers of M81 and M82 are visually separated by about 130,000 light-years. The actual separation is 300+300
−200 kly.

== Supernovae ==
As a starburst galaxy, Messier 82 is prone to frequent supernova, caused by the collapse of young, massive stars. The first (although false) supernova candidate reported was SN 1986D, initially believed to be a supernova inside the galaxy until it was found to be a variable short-wavelength infrared source instead.

The first confirmed supernova recorded in the galaxy was SN 2004am, discovered in March 2004 from images taken in November 2003 by the Lick Observatory Supernova Search. It was later determined to be a Type II supernova. In 2008, a radio transient was detected in the galaxy, designated SN 2008iz and thought to be a possible radio-only supernova, being too obscured in visible light by dust and gas clouds to be detectable. A similar radio-only transient was reported in 2009, although never received a formal designation and was similarly unconfirmed.

Prior to accurate and thorough supernova surveys, many other supernovae likely occurred in previous decades. The European VLBI Network studied a number of potential supernova remnants in the galaxy in the 1980s and 90s. One supernova remnant displayed clear expansion between 1986 and 1997 that suggested it originally went supernova in the early 1960s, and two other remnants show possible expansion that could indicate an age almost as young, but could not be confirmed at the time.

=== 2014 supernova ===
On 21 January 2014 at 19.20 UT, a new distinct star was observed in M82, at apparent magnitude +11.7, by astrophysics lecturer Steve Fossey and four of his students, at the University of London Observatory. It had brightened to magnitude +10.9 two days later. Examination of earlier observations of M82 found the supernova to figure on the intervening day as well as on 15 through 20 January, brightening from magnitude +14.4 to +11.3; it could not be found, to limiting magnitude +17, from images caught of 14 January. It was initially suggested that it could become as bright as magnitude +8.5, well within the visual range of small telescopes and large binoculars, but peaked at fainter +10.5 on the last day of the month. Preliminary analysis classified it as "a young, reddened Type Ia supernova". The International Astronomical Union (IAU) has designated it SN 2014J. SN 1993J was also at relatively close distance, in M82's larger companion galaxy M81. SN 1987A in the Large Magellanic Cloud was much closer. 2014J is the closest Type Ia supernova since SN 1972E.

== Gallery ==
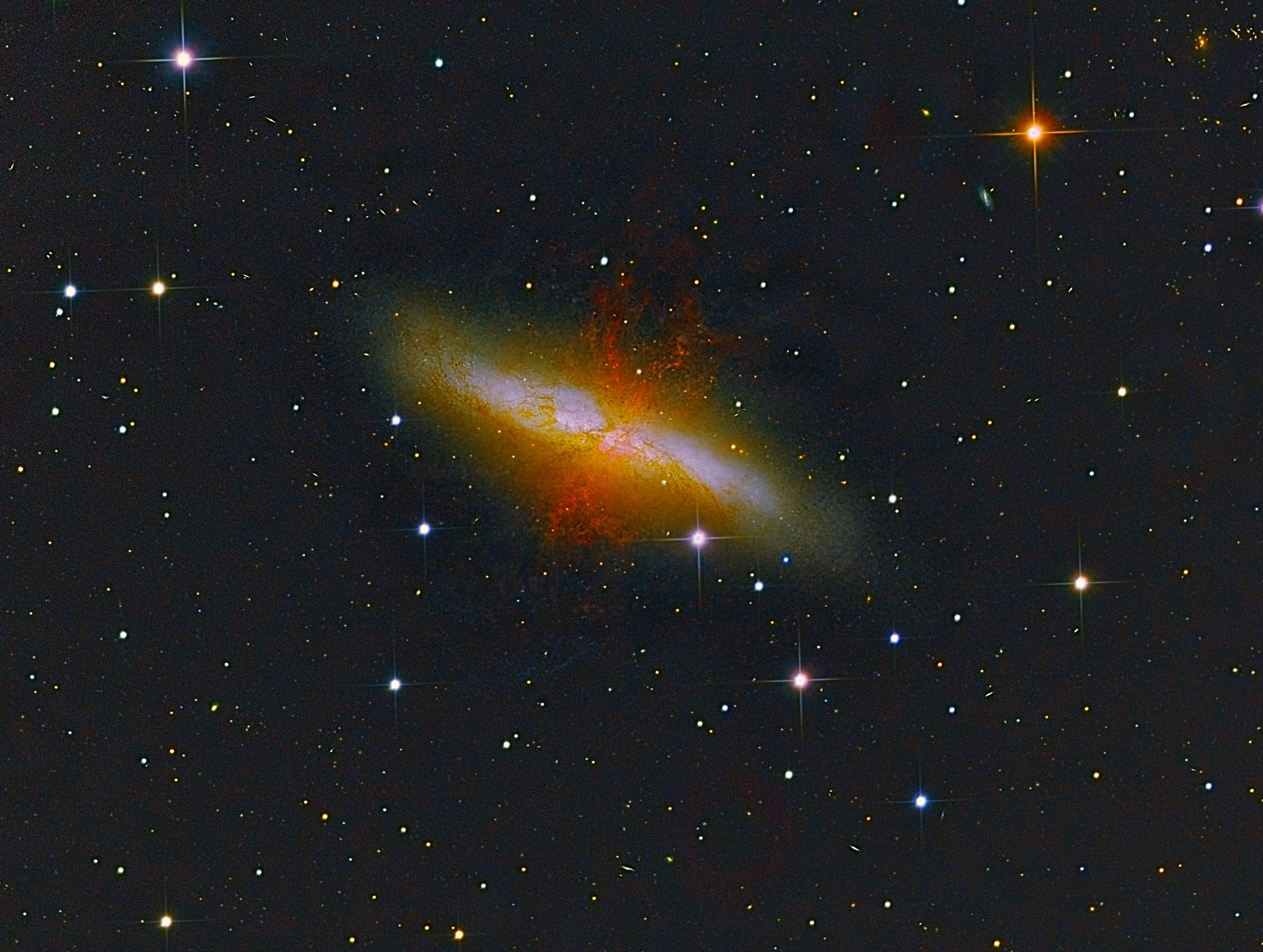
Messier 82 imaged by amateur astronomer W4SM with 17" PlaneWave CDK astrograph

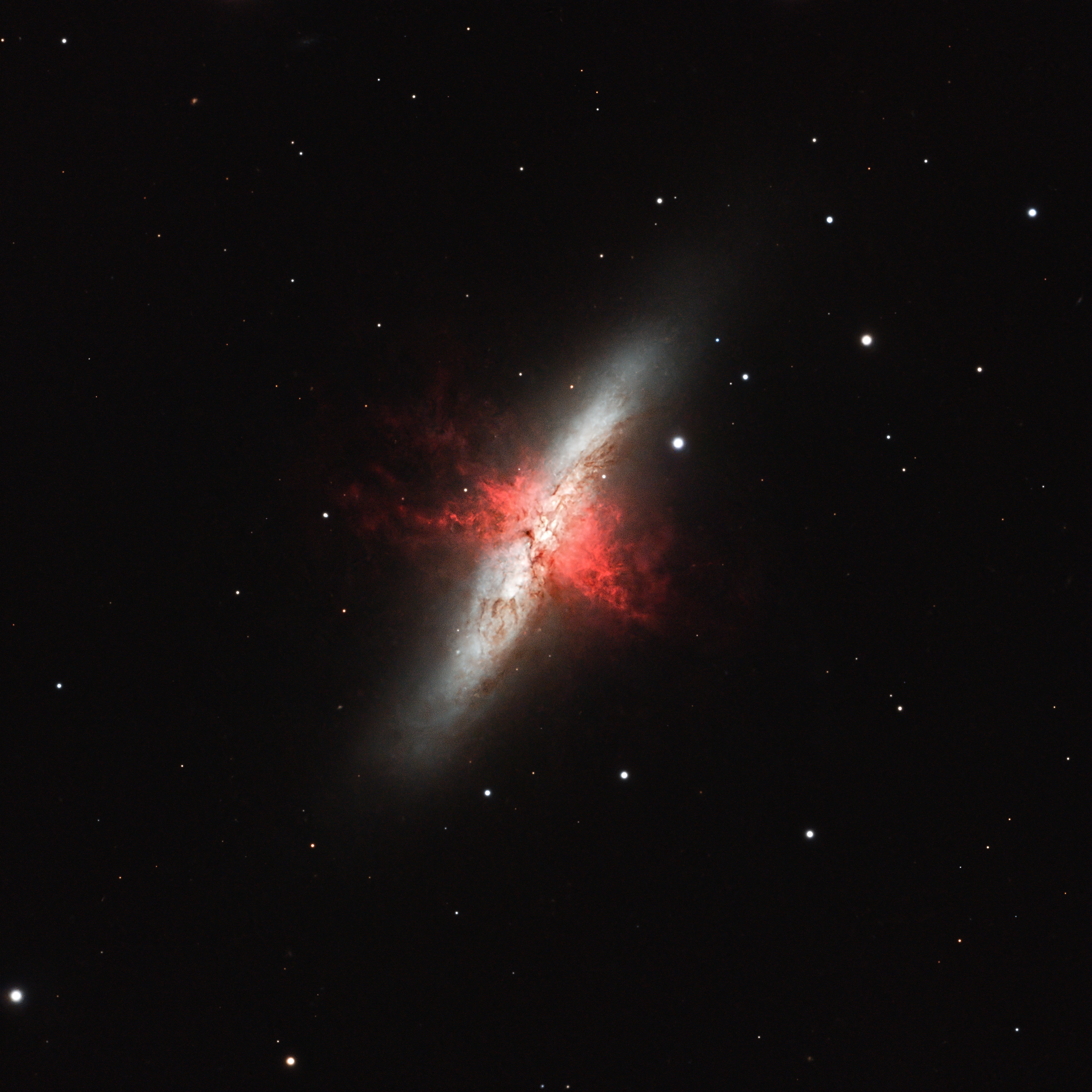
M82 cigar galaxy with its hydrogen emissions taken in France by amateur astrophotographer Anthony MICHEL

== See also ==
- List of Messier objects
- Baby Boom Galaxy – Specific starburst galaxy in the very distant universe
