= NGC 2976 =

Galaxy in the constellation Ursa Major

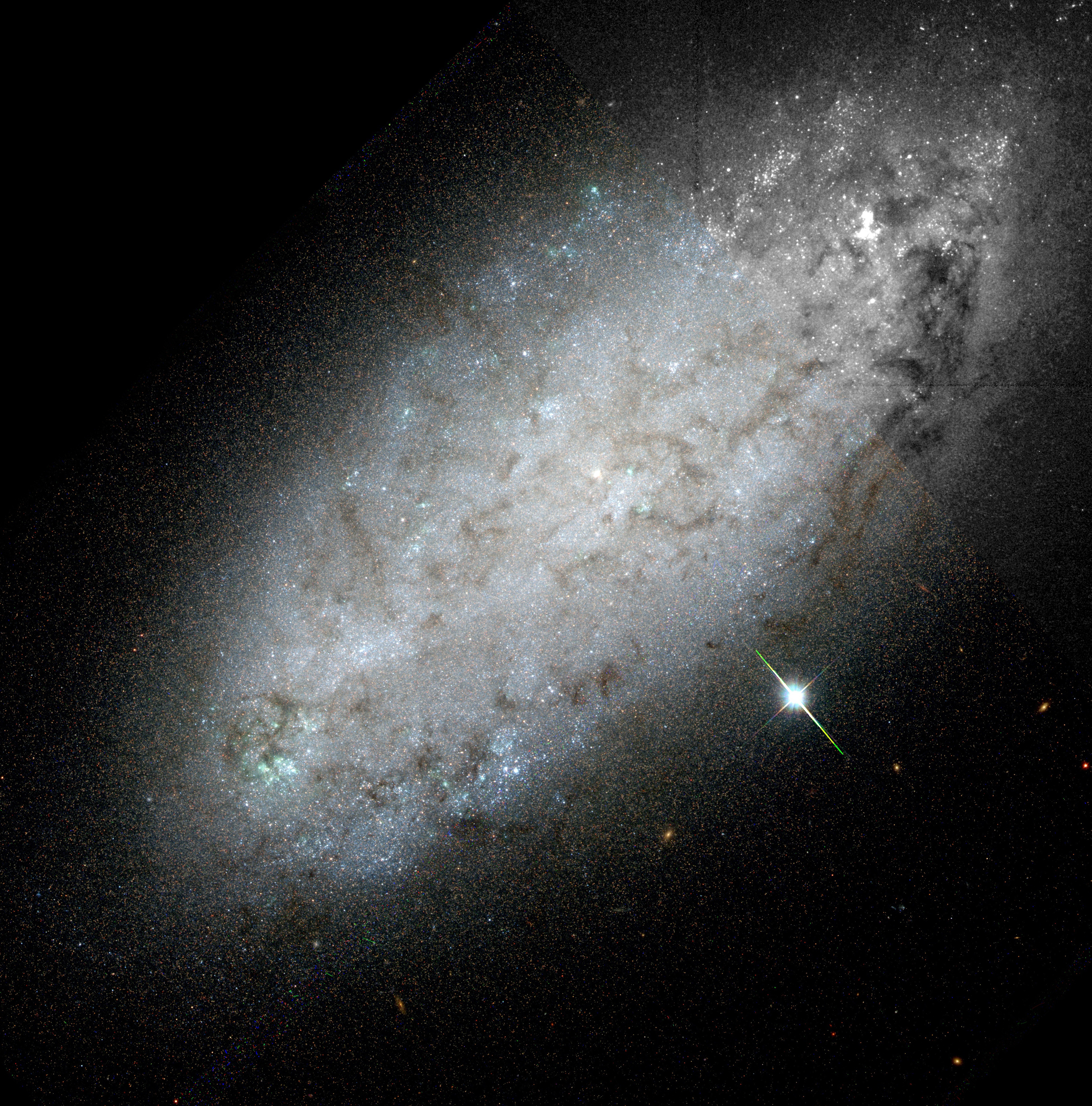

Observation data (J2000 epoch)
- Constellation: Ursa Major
- Right ascension: 09^{h} 47^{m} 15.458^{s}
- Declination: +67° 54′ 58.97″
- Distance: 11.6 ± 1.2 Mly (3.56 ± 0.38 Mpc)
- Group or cluster: M81 Group
- Apparent magnitude (V): 10.8
- Absolute magnitude (B): 16.90

Characteristics
- Type: SAa
- Size: 6 kpc
- Apparent size (V): 5.89′ × 3.02′
- Notable features: Peculiar

Other designations
- IRAS 09431+6809, UGC 5221, H I.285, PGC 28120

NGC 2976 is a peculiar dwarf galaxy in the northern constellation of Ursa Major. It was discovered by German-born astronomer William Herschel on November 8, 1801, and catalogued as H I.285. J. L. E. Dreyer described it as, "bright, very large, much extended 152°, star involved". It is a member of the M81 Group and lies 1° 20′ to the southwest of Messier 81. The projected separation of this galaxy from the M81 Group is 190 kpc.

The morphological classification of this galaxy is SAa, which matches an unbarred spiral galaxy (SA) with very tightly-wound spiral arms (a). The actual visual form of the galaxy is a pure disk with no spiral arms or bulge. The luminosity and size of this galaxy is mid-way between the Large and Small Magellanic Clouds. De Vaucouleurs and associates classed it as type SAc, suggesting more loosely wound arms. It is inclined at an angle of 65° to the line of sight from the Earth.

Although appearing as a disk, there is evidence for a non-axisymmetric form of gas distribution, with a suggestion of central bar plus large-scale spiral arms. The inner structure contains many dark lanes and stellar condensations in its disk. There are two strong H II regions, one to each side. The overall star formation rate is 0.2 M_{☉} y^{−1}. The outer disk shows a history of steady star formation, although the formation rate has declined significantly over the last billion years and the population is now dominated by older stars. Within a ~3 kpc radius of the center, star formation has been steady, having not undergone a recent decline.

There is a cloud of neutral hydrogen with a mass of (2.67±0.65)×10^{7} M_{☉} located 27 kpc to the northeast of this galaxy, which may be interacting gravitationally with NGC 2976. The galaxy also shows evidence of tidal stripping, with an extended tidal tail of neutral hydrogen. The last significant interaction took place around one billion years ago.

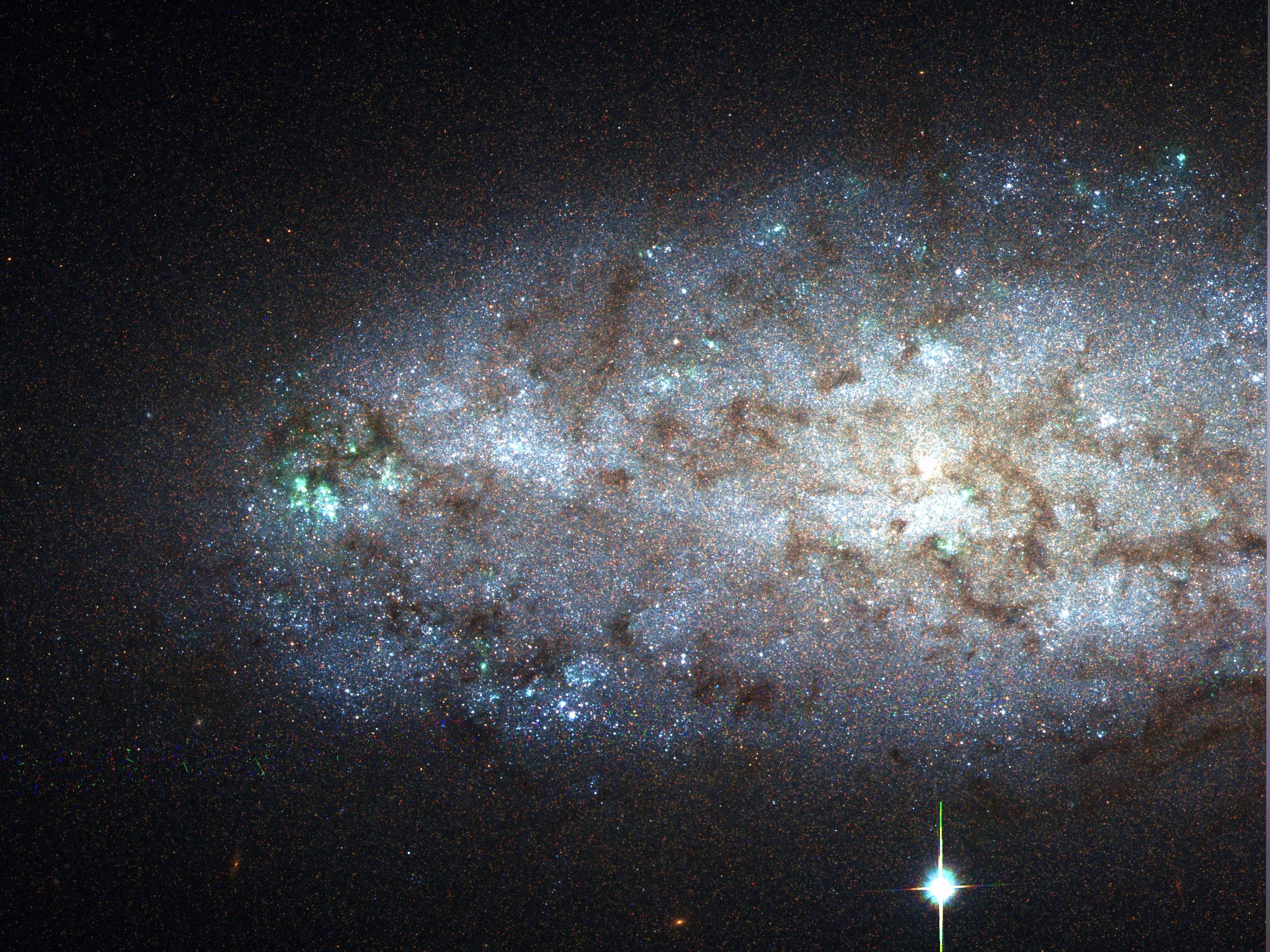
Closeup of NGC 2976 by the Hubble Space Telescope
