= Messier 81 =

Spiral galaxy in the constellation Ursa Major

- The HST's view of M81, with its open star clusters, globular star clusters, and regions of fluorescent gas.

Observation data (J2000 epoch)
- Constellation: Ursa Major
- Right ascension: 09^{h} 55^{m} 33.1730^{s}
- Declination: +69° 03′ 55.060″
- Redshift: 0.000130±0.00000900
- Heliocentric radial velocity: −39±3 km/s
- Galactocentric velocity: 73±6 km/s
- Distance: 11.99 ± 0.16 Mly (3.675 ± 0.049 Mpc)
- Apparent magnitude (V): 6.94
- Surface brightness: 22.78 (B)

Characteristics
- Type: SA(s)ab, LINER
- Size: 29.44 kiloparsecs (96,000 light-years) (diameter; 25.0 mag/arcsec^{2} B-band isophote)
- Apparent size (V): 26.9′ × 14.1′

Other designations
- Bode's Galaxy, IRAS 09514+6918, NGC 3031, UGC 5318, MCG +12-10-010, PGC 28630, CGCG 333-007

Messier 81 (also known as NGC 3031 or Bode's Galaxy) is a grand design spiral galaxy about 12 million light-years away in the constellation Ursa Major. It has a D_{25} isophotal diameter of 29.44 kiloparsecs (96,000 light-years).

Because of its relative proximity to the Milky Way galaxy, large size, and active galactic nucleus (which harbors a 70 million M_{☉} supermassive black hole), Messier 81 has been studied extensively by professional astronomers. The galaxy's large size and relatively high brightness also make it a popular target for amateur astronomers. In late February 2022, astronomers reported that M81 may be the source of FRB 20200120E, a repeating fast radio burst.

== Discovery ==
Messier 81 was first discovered by Johann Elert Bode on 31 December 1774. Thus, it is sometimes referred to as "Bode's Galaxy". In 1779, Pierre Méchain and Charles Messier reidentified Bode's object, hence listed it in the Messier Catalogue.

== Visibility ==
The galaxy is to be found approximately 10° northwest of Alpha Ursae Majoris (Dubhe) along with several other galaxies in the Messier 81 Group. Its apparent magnitude due to its distance means it requires a good night sky and only rises very briefly and extremely low at its southernmost limit from Earth's surface, about the 20th parallel south.

Messier 81 and Messier 82 are considered ideal for viewing using binoculars and small telescopes. The two objects are generally not observable to the unaided eye, although highly experienced amateur astronomers may be able to see Messier 81 under exceptional observing conditions with a very dark sky. Telescopes with apertures of 8 inches (20 cm) or larger are needed to distinguish structures in the galaxy.

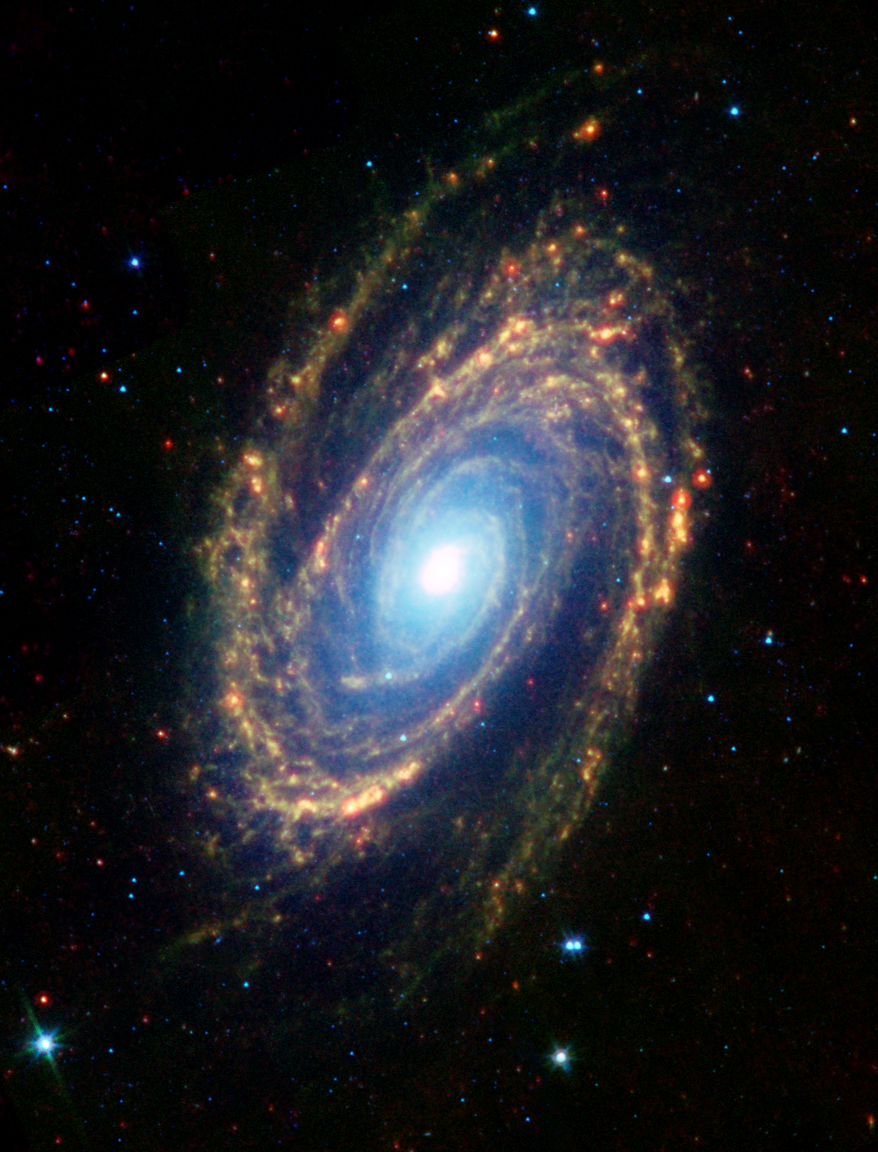
An infrared image of Messier 81 taken by the Spitzer Space Telescope. The blue colors represent stellar emission observed at 3.6 μm. The green colors represent 8 μm emission originating primarily from polycyclic aromatic hydrocarbons in the interstellar medium. The red colors represent 24 μm emission originating from heated dust in the interstellar medium.

The galaxy is best observed during April.

== Interstellar dust ==
Most of the emission at infrared wavelengths originates from interstellar dust. This interstellar dust is found primarily within the galaxy's spiral arms, and it has been shown to be associated with star formation regions. The general explanation is that the hot, short-lived blue stars that are found within star formation regions are very effective at heating the dust and thus enhancing the infrared dust emission from these regions.

== Globular clusters ==
It is estimated M81 has 210 ± 30 globular clusters. In late February 2022, astronomers reported that M81 may be the source of FRB 20200120E, a repeating fast radio burst.

== Supernova ==
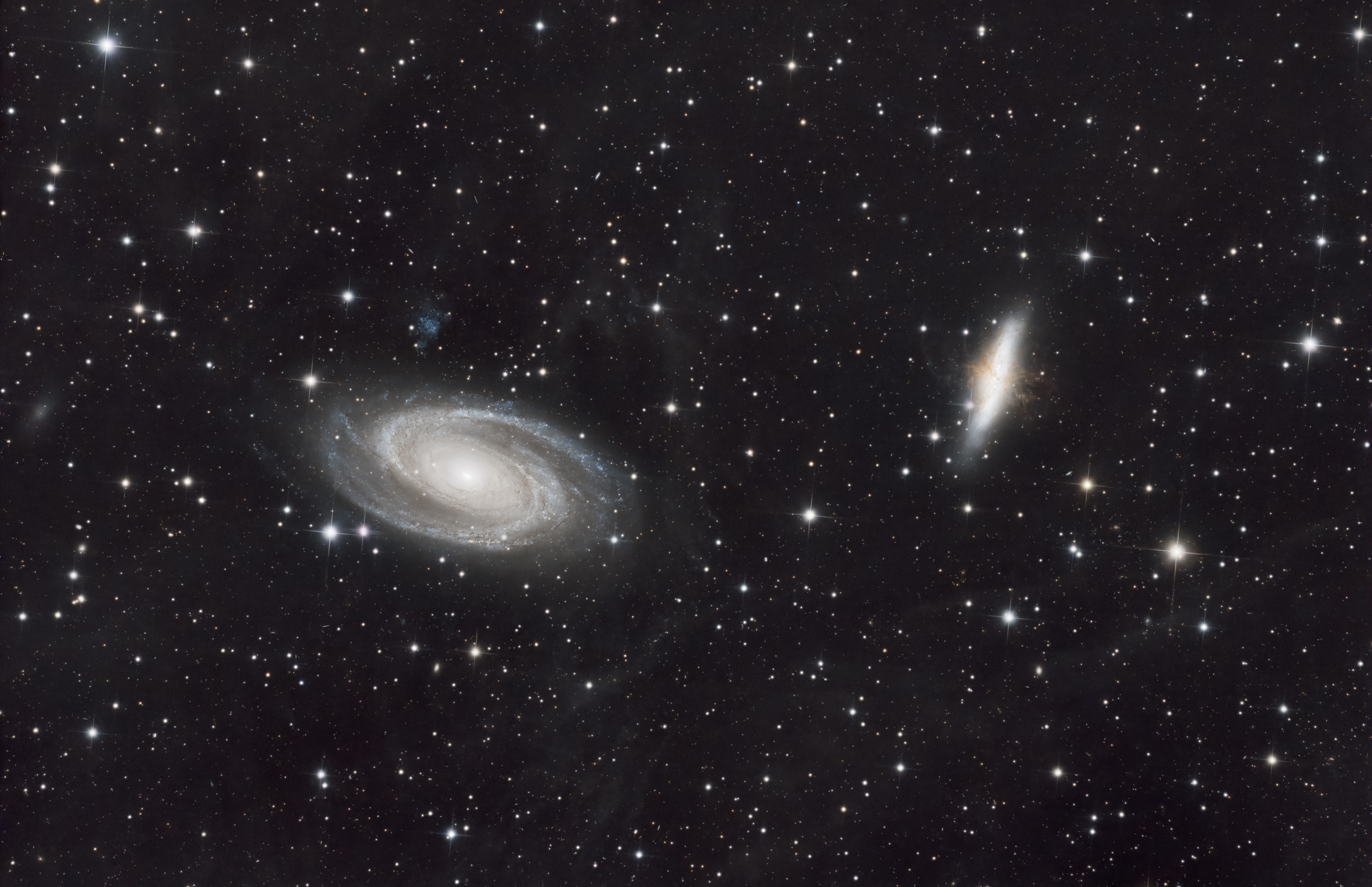
M81 (left) and M82 (right). M82 is one of two galaxies strongly influenced gravitationally by M81. The other, NGC 3077, is located off the top edge of this image.

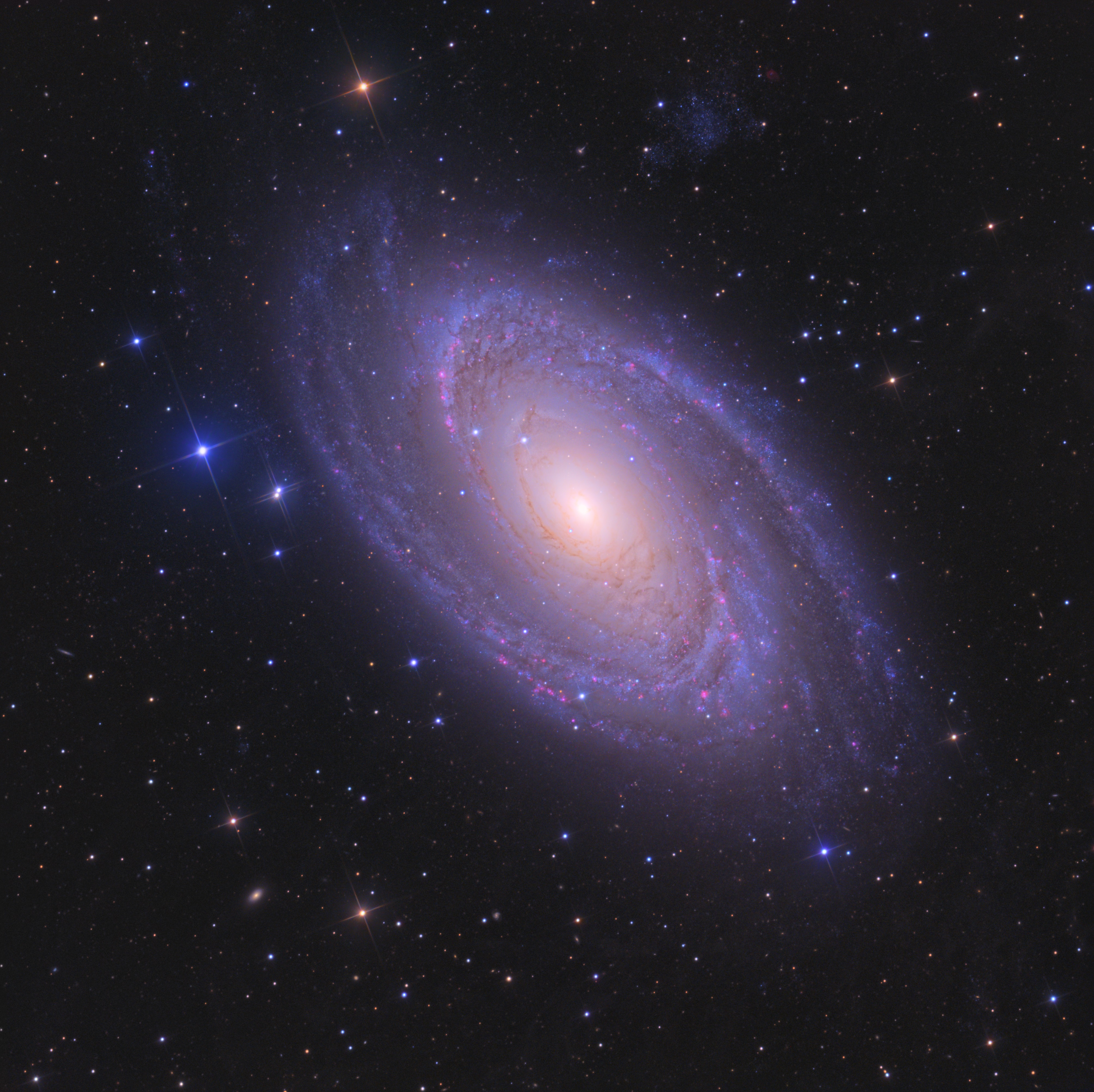
M81 with satellite galaxy Holmberg IX, shown top center-right.

Only one supernova has been detected in Messier 81. The supernova, named SN 1993J, was discovered on 28 March 1993 by F. García in Spain. At the time, it was the second brightest Type II supernova observed in the 20th century, peaking at an apparent magnitude of 10.7. The spectral characteristics of the supernova changed over time. Initially, it looked more like a Type II supernova (a supernova formed by the explosion of a supergiant star) with strong hydrogen spectral line emission, but later the hydrogen lines faded and strong helium spectral lines appeared, making the supernova look more like a Type Ib.

Moreover, the variations in SN 1993J's luminosity over time were not like the variations observed in other Type II supernovae, but did resemble the variations observed in Type Ib supernovae. Hence, the supernova has been classified as a Type IIb, a transitory class between Type II and Type Ib. The scientific results from this supernova suggested that Type Ib and Ic supernovae were formed through the explosions of giant stars through processes similar to those taking place in Type II supernovae. Despite the uncertainties in modeling the unusual supernova, it was also used to estimate a very approximate distance of 8.5 ± 1.3 Mly (2.6 ± 0.4 Mpc) to Messier 81. As a local galaxy, the Central Bureau for Astronomical Telegrams (CBAT) tracks novae in M81 along with M31 and M33.

== SMBH ==
In the center of M81 there exists a supermassive black hole (SMBH) with a mass of about 7×10^{7} M_{☉}. The SMBH is active, having an accretion disk and one-sided relativistic jet. The observation also demonstrate that there may exist a second SMBH that orbits the primary SMBH with a period of around 30 years. The mass of the secondary SMBH is estimated at 0.1 of the primary.

== Environment ==
Messier 81 is the largest galaxy in the M81 Group, a group of 34 in the constellation Ursa Major. At approximately 11.7 Mly (3.6 Mpc) from the Earth, it makes this group and the Local Group, containing the Milky Way, relative neighbors in the Virgo Supercluster.

Gravitational interactions of M81 with M82 and NGC 3077 have stripped hydrogen gas away from all three galaxies, forming gaseous filamentary structures in the group. Moreover, these interactions have allowed interstellar gas to fall into the centers of M82 and NGC 3077, leading to vigorous star formation or starburst activity there.

== Distance ==
The distance to Messier 81 has been measured by Freedman et al to be 3.63 ± 0.34 megaparsecs (11.8 ± 1.1 million light-years) by using the Hubble Space Telescope to identify classical Cepheid variables and measure their periods using the period–luminosity relation discovered by Henrietta Swan Leavitt.

== See also ==
- List of galaxies
- List of Messier objects
- Messier object
- New General Catalogue
