= M61 =

M61 or M-61 may refer to:

In transportation:

- M61 motorway, a motorway in England
- M-61 (Michigan highway), a state highway in Michigan
- M61, a class of locomotives built by NOHAB

In science:

- Messier 61 (M61), a spiral galaxy in the Virgo Cluster

In firearms and military equipment:

- M61 Vulcan, a rotary cannon developed for the United States Armed Forces and used in fighter aircraft and other applications
- M61 (grenade), a fragmentation hand grenade used by the United States Armed Forces
- M61 Skorpion, a Yugoslav designation for the CZ-Scorpion pistol
- M61 gas mask, a gas mask used by the Finnish Defence Forces of which three variants were made
