= SN 2020jfo =

2020 supernova event in Messier 61 in the constellation Virgo

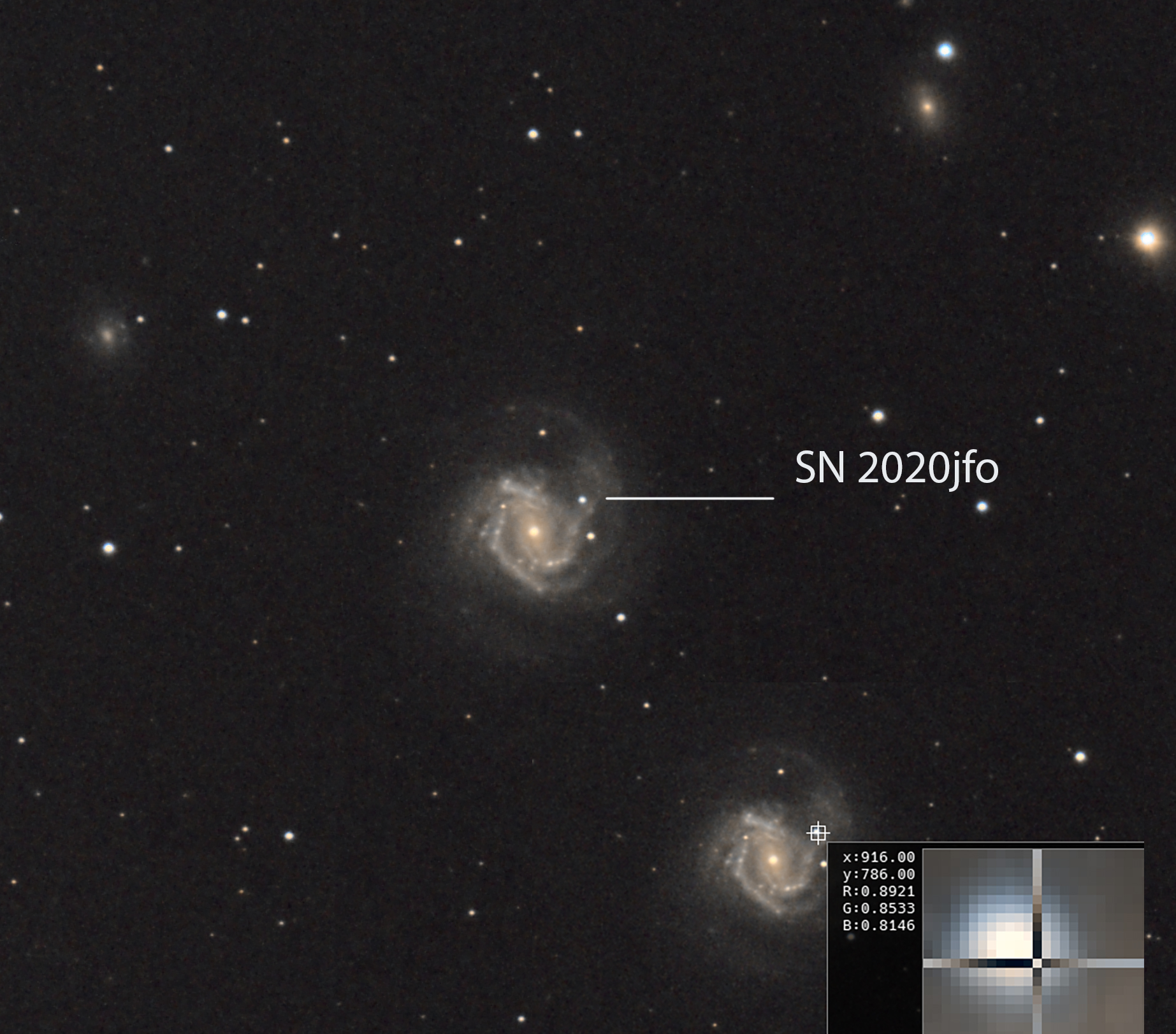
- Supernova 2020jfo is the bright star inside the Messier 61 galaxy.
- Event type: Supernova
- Type II (peculiar)
- Date: May 06, 2020
- Constellation: Virgo
- Right ascension: 4^{h} 28^{m} 54.05^{s}
- Declination: 12° 21′ 50.480″
- Epoch: J2000
- Distance: 0.00502 redshift
- Redshift: 0.00502
- Host: Messier 61
- Notable features: Detailed data on progenitor star in archives
- Peak apparent magnitude: +16.01

SN 2020jfo was a Type II supernova in the Messier 61 galaxy, first observed on 6 May 2020 with an apparent magnitude of 16.01. It was one of the first supernovae for which independent, multi-instrument data was collected before, during, and after the explosion. Large astronomical surveys like Transiting Exoplanet Survey Satellite (TESS) and Pan-STARRS have played a role in data collection before and after these events.

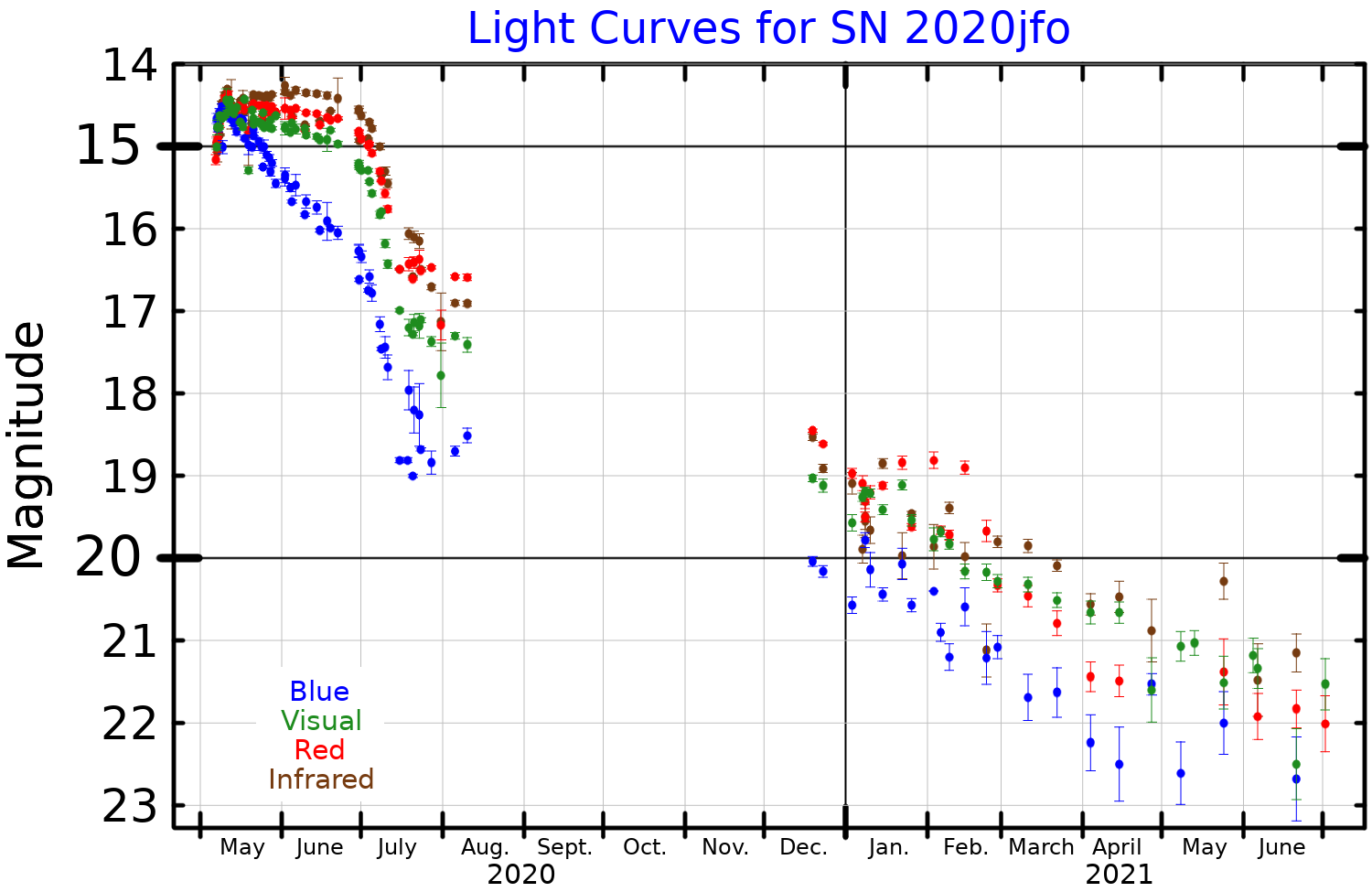
Light curves for SN 2020jfo in four photometric bands, plotted from data published by Ailawadhi et al. (2023)
