= NGC 4301 =

Galaxy in the constellation Coma Berenices

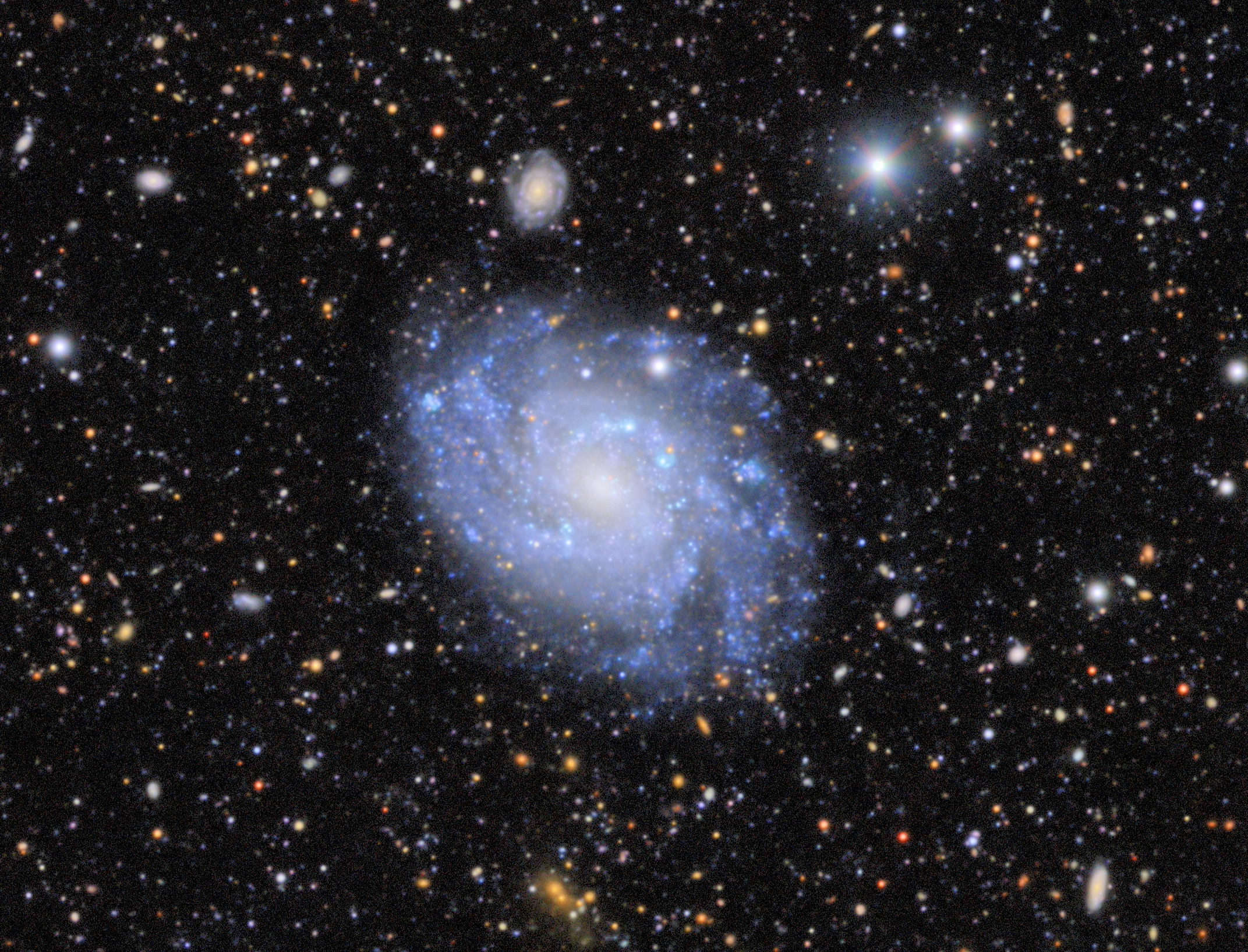
- NGC 4301 imaged by the Vera C. Rubin Observatory

Observation data (J2000 epoch)
- Constellation: Virgo
- Right ascension: 12^{h} 22^{m} 27.1969^{s}
- Declination: +04° 33′ 58.361″
- Redshift: 0.004286±0.000002
- Heliocentric radial velocity: 1,285±1 km/s
- Distance: 78.5 ± 5.6 Mly (24.06 ± 1.72 Mpc)
- Group or cluster: Virgo Cluster
- Apparent magnitude (V): 12.5

Characteristics
- Type: SAB(s)cd
- Size: ~22,200 ly (6.82 kpc) (estimated)
- Apparent size (V): 1.5′ × 1.3′

Other designations
- VCC 552, HOLM 379B, IRAS 12198+0450, 2MASX J12222724+0433586, NGC 4303A, UGC 7439, MCG +01-32-027, PGC 40087, CGCG 042-053

NGC 4301 is a barred spiral galaxy in the constellation of Virgo. Its velocity with respect to the cosmic microwave background is 1,631±24 km/s, which corresponds to a Hubble distance of 78.5 ± 5.6 Mly (24.06 ± 1.72 Mpc). It was discovered by Irish engineer Bindon Blood Stoney on 21 April 1851. It is a member of the Virgo Cluster, listed as VCC 552.

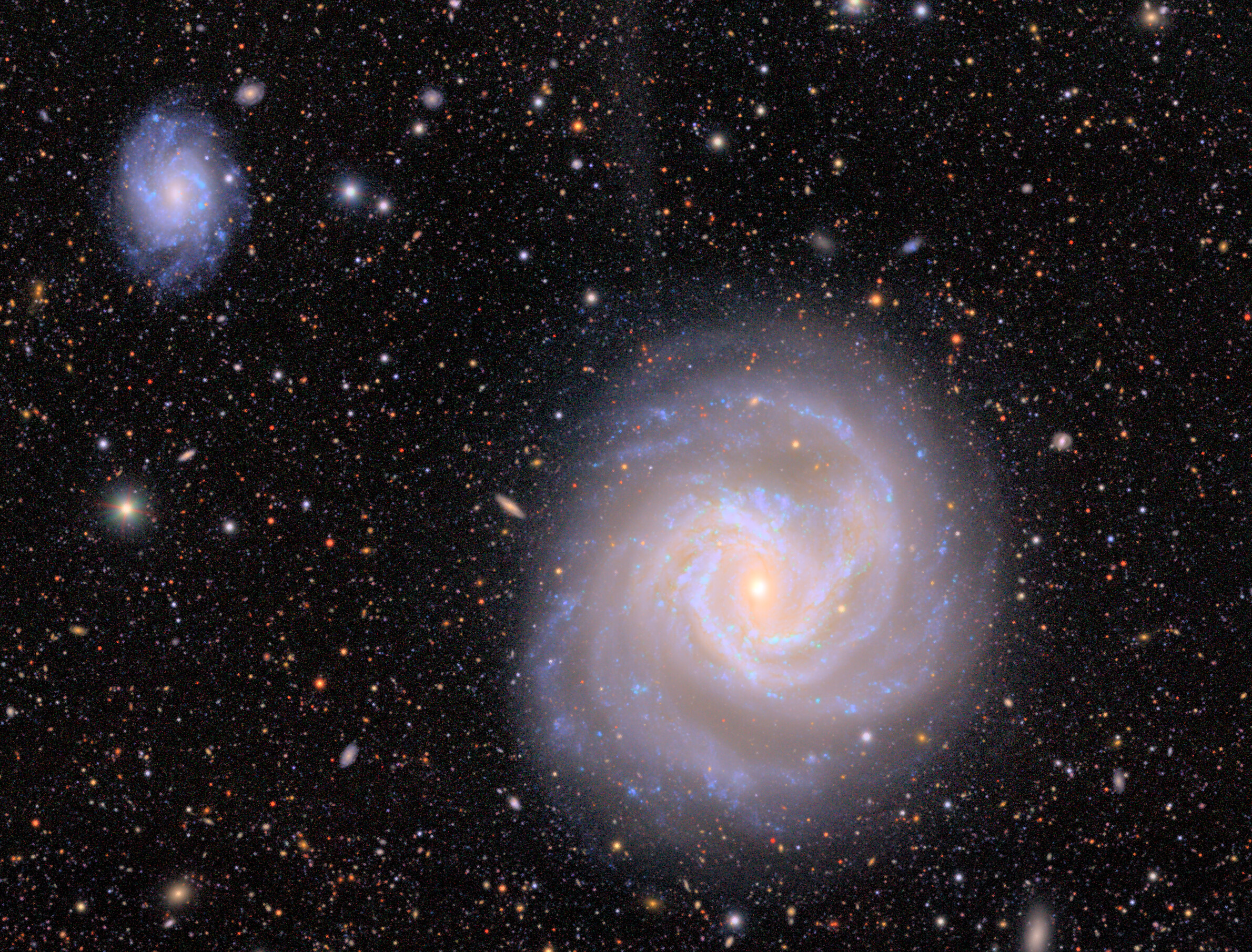
NGC 4301 with its larger companion, M61, imaged by the Vera C. Rubin Observatory

NGC 4301 and Messier 61 are listed together as Holm 379 in Erik Holmberg's A Study of Double and Multiple Galaxies Together with Inquiries into some General Metagalactic Problems, published in 1937. NGC 4301 is often referred to as NGC 4303A due to its proximity to NGC 4303 (another name for Messier 61) and a prolonged history of misidentification.

== See also ==
- List of NGC objects (4001–5000)
