= SN 1961I =

Supernova within the Messier 61 galaxy

- Event type: Supernova
- SN.II
- Constellation: Virgo
- Other designations: SN 1961I

SN 1961i was a supernova that was discovered in June 1961 in the Messier 61 (NGC 4303) galaxy, by Milton L. Humason at the Palomar Observatory, the brightest of 16 supernovae found at Palomar that year. Although it was originally considered by Fritz Zwicky to be the prototype of a Type III supernova, subsequent researchers have classified it as a Type II supernova.
