= Supernova =

Astrophysical phenomenon

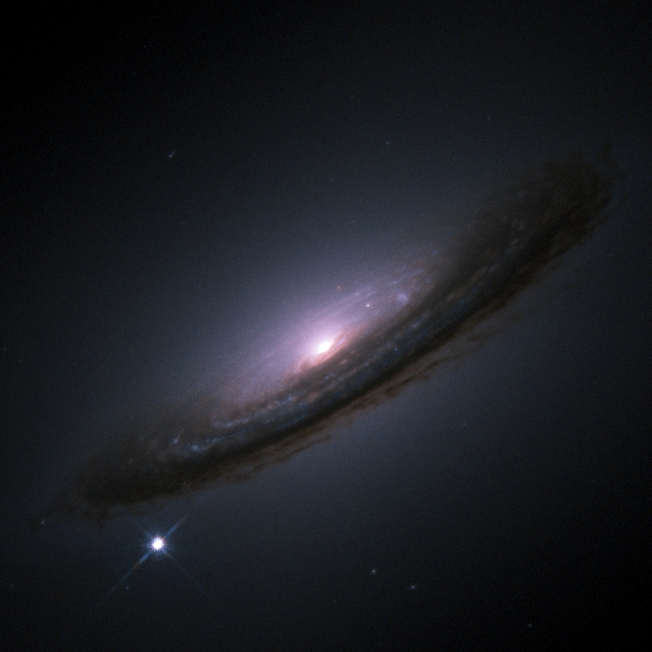
SN 1994D (bright spot on the lower left), a Type Ia supernova within its host galaxy, NGC 4526

A supernova (pl.: supernovae) is a powerful and luminous explosion of a star. A supernova occurs during the last evolutionary stages of a massive star, or when a white dwarf undergoes runaway nuclear fusion. The original object, called the progenitor, can collapse to form a neutron star, black hole, or completely disperse into a diffuse nebula with no stellar remnant. The peak optical luminosity of a supernova can be comparable to that of an entire galaxy before fading over several weeks or months.

It is expected that supernovae in our galaxy occur on average once every 61 years, although the last to be observed was Kepler's Supernova in 1604. SN 1987A occurred in the Large Magellanic Cloud, a satellite galaxy of our galaxy, in 1987. Several thousand supernovae are typically seen in distant galaxies every year.

Theoretical studies indicate that most supernovae are triggered by one of two basic mechanisms: the sudden re-ignition of nuclear fusion in a white dwarf, or the rapid gravitational collapse of a massive star's core.

- In the re-ignition of a white dwarf, the object's temperature is raised enough to ignite runaway nuclear fusion, completely disrupting the star. This is thought to be achieved by accretion of material from a binary companion, or by a stellar merger.
- In the case of a massive star's demise, fusion of heavier elements releases progressively less energy, and the core collapses once radiation pressure no longer balances gravity. The classic example is when a star begins producing iron, but this can also happen during an earlier stage of metal fusion.

Supernovae can expel several solar masses of material at speeds up to several percent of the speed of light. This drives an expanding shock wave into the surrounding interstellar medium, sweeping up a shell of gas and dust observed as a supernova remnant. These expanding shock waves can trigger the formation of new stars. Supernovae are a major source of heavier elements in the interstellar medium, from oxygen to rubidium. Supernovae are also a major source of cosmic rays, and may produce gravitational waves.

== Occurrence ==
The first supernovae to be studied by astronomical methods were Tycho's Supernova in 1572 and Kepler's Supernova in 1604, both of which were in the Milky Way and were visible to the naked eye. Analysis of the historical record suggests that, aside from telescope discoveries, fewer than 10 supernovae have been observed over the last 2,000 years.

Observations of recent supernova remnants within the Milky Way, coupled with studies of supernovae in other galaxies, suggest that these powerful stellar explosions occur in our galaxy approximately 1.6 to 4.6 times per century on average.

In 1987, the supernova SN 1987A appeared in the Large Magellanic Cloud, a satellite galaxy of the Milky Way in an easily studied part of the sky. Many astronomical observations were made on SN 1987A, including the only measurements of astronomical neutrinos other than the Sun's. The event was attributed to an explosion of a blue supergiant star.

== Etymology ==
The word supernova has the plural form supernovae (/-viː/) or supernovas and is often abbreviated as SN or SNe. It is derived from the Latin word nova, meaning 'new', which refers to what appears to be a temporary new bright star. Adding the prefix "super-" distinguishes supernovae from ordinary novae, which are far less luminous. The word supernova was coined by Walter Baade and Fritz Zwicky, who began using it in astrophysics lectures in 1931. Its first use in a journal article came the following year in a publication by Knut Lundmark, who may have coined it independently.

== Observation history ==
Supernovae provide unique observational challenges. Compared to a star's entire lifespan the visual appearance of a supernova is very brief, often spanning weeks to months, so the chances of observing one with the naked eye are slim. Only a tiny fraction of the stars in a typical galaxy have the capacity to become a supernova, being those with sufficient mass or rare kinds of binary star systems with at least one white dwarf.

=== Early observations ===
A rock carving in the Burzahama region of Kashmir, dated to 4500±1000 BC showing what might be nova HB9 is the earliest of many claimed but unverifiable records of supernovae by prehistoric people. The first widely recorded supernova was SN 1006, observed in AD 1006 in the constellation of Lupus. This event was described by observers in China, Japan, Iraq, Egypt and Europe.

The supernova SN 1054, which produced the Crab Nebula, was recorded by Chinese astronomers in AD 1054. Supernovae SN 1572 and SN 1604, the latest Milky Way supernovae to be observed with the naked eye, had a notable influence on the development of astronomy in Europe because they were used to argue against the Aristotelian idea that the universe beyond the Moon and planets was static and unchanging. Johannes Kepler began observing SN 1604 at its peak on 17 October 1604, and continued to make estimates of its brightness until it faded from naked eye view a year later. It was the second supernova to be observed in a generation, after Tycho Brahe observed SN 1572 in Cassiopeia.

There is some evidence that the youngest known supernova in our galaxy, G1.9+0.3, occurred in the late 19th century, considerably more recently than Cassiopeia A from around 1680. Neither was noted at the time. In the case of G1.9+0.3, high extinction from dust along the plane of the galactic disk could have dimmed the event sufficiently for it to go unnoticed. The situation for Cassiopeia A is less clear; infrared light echoes have been detected showing that it was not in a region of especially high extinction.

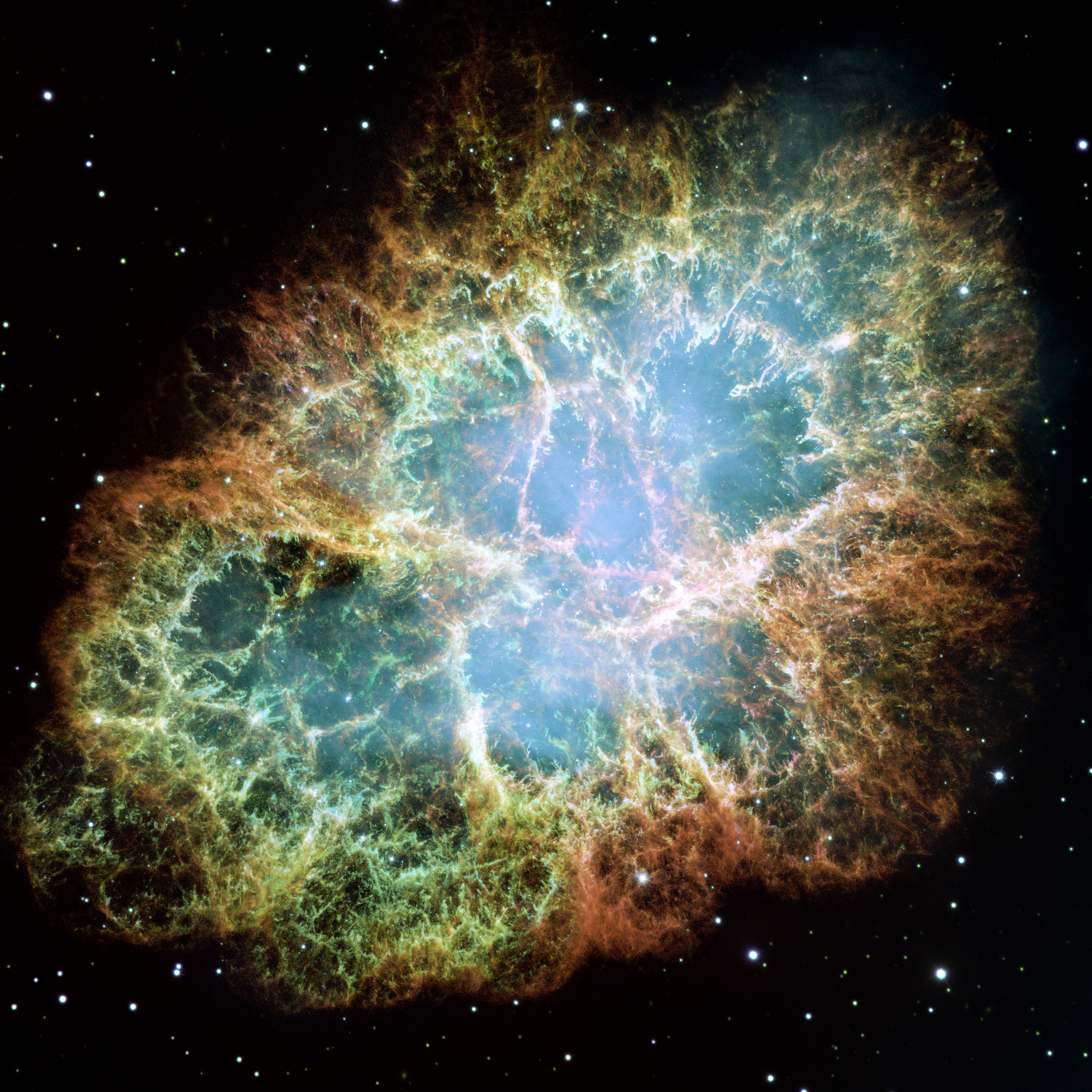
The Crab Nebula is a pulsar wind nebula associated with the 1054 supernova.

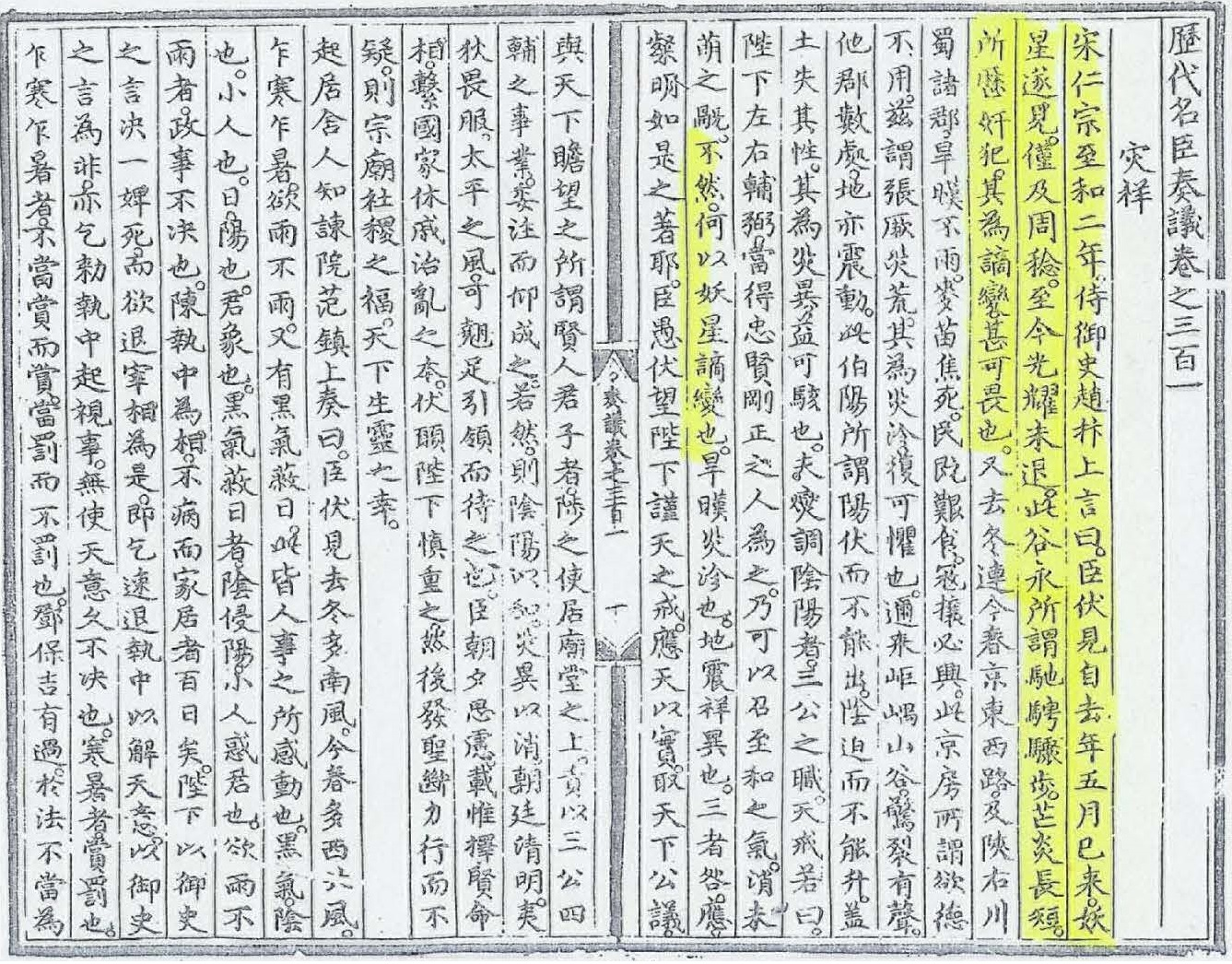
A 1414 text cites a 1055 report: since "the baleful star appeared, a full year has passed and until now its brilliance has not faded".

Historical novae
year	observed in	maximum apparent magnitude	certainty of the SN's identification
185	constellation of Centaurus	−6	possible SN, but may be a comet
386	constellation of Sagittarius	+1.5	uncertain whether SN or classical nova
393	constellation of Scorpius	−3	possible SN
1006	constellation of Lupus	−7.5±0.4	certain
1054	constellation of Taurus	−6	certain; remnant and pulsar known
1181	constellation of Cassiopeia	−2	likely Type Iax SN associated with the remnant Pa30
1572	constellation of Cassiopeia	−4	certain; remnant known
1604	constellation of Ophiuchus	−2	certain; remnant known

=== Telescope findings ===
With the development of the astronomical telescope, observation and discovery of fainter and more distant supernovae became possible. The first such observation was of SN 1885A in the Andromeda Galaxy. A decade later, two further supernovae, SN 1895A and SN 1895B, were discovered in NGC 4424 and NGC 5253 respectively. Early work on what was originally believed to be simply a new category of novae was performed during the 1920s. These were variously called "upper-class Novae", "Hauptnovae", or "giant novae". The name "supernovae" is thought to have been coined by Walter Baade and Fritz Zwicky in lectures at Caltech in 1931. It was used, as "super-Novae", in a journal paper published by Knut Lundmark in 1933, and in a 1934 paper by Baade and Zwicky. By 1938, the hyphen was no longer used and the modern name was in use.

Rudolph Minkowski and Fritz Zwicky developed the modern supernova classification scheme beginning in 1941. During the 1960s, astronomers found that the maximum intensities of certain types of supernovae could be used as standard candles, becoming useful indicators of astronomical distances. Some of the most distant supernovae observed in 2003 appeared dimmer than expected. This supports the view that the expansion of the universe is accelerating. Techniques were developed for reconstructing supernovae events that have no written records of being observed by analysing their remnants and other features they leave behind. The date of the Cassiopeia A supernova event was determined from light echoes off nebulae, while the age of supernova remnant RX J0852.0-4622 was estimated from temperature measurements and the gamma ray emissions from the radioactive decay of ^{44}Ti.

Jades Deep Field. A team of astronomers studying JADES data identified about 80 objects (circled in green) that changed in brightness over time. Most of these objects, known as transients, are the result of exploding stars or supernovae.

The most luminous supernova ever recorded is ASASSN-15lh, at a distance of 3.82 gigalight-years. It was first detected in June 2015 and peaked at 570 billion L_{☉}, which is twice the bolometric luminosity of any other known supernova. The nature of this supernova is debated and several alternative explanations, such as tidal disruption of a star by a black hole, have been suggested.

SN 2013fs was recorded three hours after the supernova event on 6 October 2013, by the Intermediate Palomar Transient Factory. This is among the earliest supernovae caught after detonation, and it is the earliest for which spectra have been obtained, beginning six hours after the actual explosion. The star is located in a spiral galaxy named NGC 7610, 160 million light-years away in the constellation of Pegasus.

The supernova SN 2016gkg was detected by amateur astronomer Victor Buso from Rosario, Argentina, on 20 September 2016. It was the first time that the initial "shock breakout" from an optical supernova had been observed. The progenitor star has been identified in Hubble Space Telescope images from before its collapse. Astronomer Alex Filippenko noted: "Observations of stars in the first moments they begin exploding provide information that cannot be directly obtained in any other way."

=== Discovery programs ===
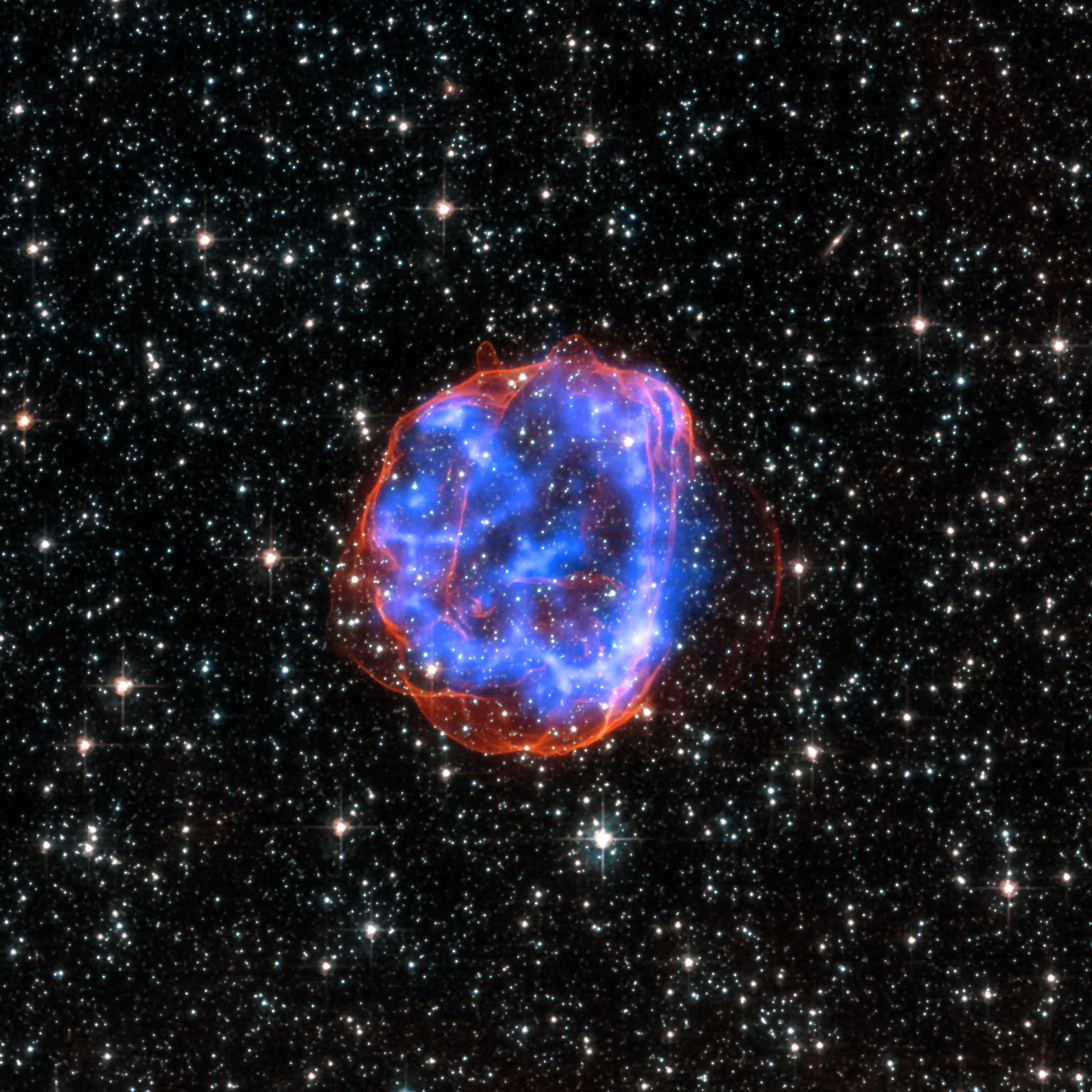
Supernova remnant SNR E0519-69.0 in the Large Magellanic Cloud

Because supernovae are relatively rare events within a galaxy, occurring about three times a century in the Milky Way, obtaining a good sample of supernovae to study requires regular monitoring of many galaxies. Today, amateur and professional astronomers are finding about two thousand every year, some when near maximum brightness, others on old astronomical photographs or plates. Supernovae cannot be predicted with any meaningful accuracy, with error margins far longer than a human lifespan. Normally, when they are discovered, they are already in progress. To use supernovae as standard candles for measuring distance, observation of their peak luminosity is required. It is therefore important to discover them early as possible. Amateur astronomers, who greatly outnumber professional astronomers, have played an important role in finding supernovae, typically by looking at some of the closer galaxies through an optical telescope and comparing them to earlier photographs.

Toward the end of the 20th century, astronomers increasingly turned to computer-controlled telescopes and CCDs for hunting supernovae. While such systems are popular with amateurs, there are also professional installations such as the Katzman Automatic Imaging Telescope. The Supernova Early Warning System (SNEWS) project uses a network of neutrino detectors to give early warning of a supernova in the Milky Way galaxy. Neutrinos are subatomic particles that are produced in great quantities by a supernova, and they are not significantly absorbed by the interstellar gas and dust of the galactic disk, so they are often the earliest indication of a new supernova.

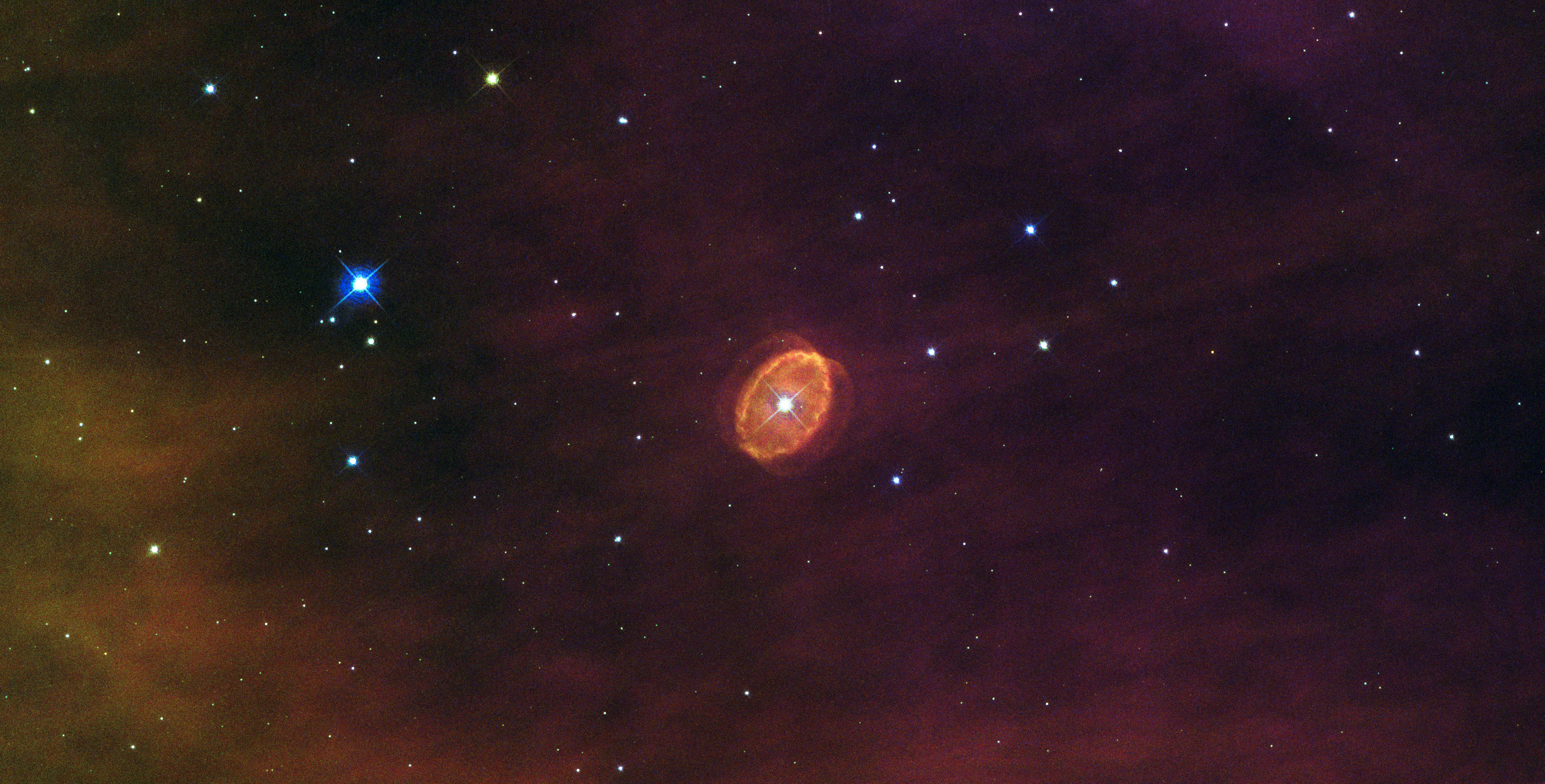
"A star set to explode", the SBW1 nebula surrounds a massive blue supergiant in the Carina Nebula.

Supernova searches fall into two classes: those focused on relatively nearby events and those looking farther away. Because of the expansion of the universe, the distance to a remote object with a known emission spectrum can be estimated by measuring its Doppler shift (or redshift); on average, more-distant objects recede with greater velocity than those nearby, and so have a higher redshift. Thus the search is split between high redshift and low redshift, with the boundary falling around a redshift range of z=0.1–0.3, where z is a dimensionless measure of the spectrum's frequency shift.

High-redshift searches for supernovae usually involve the observation of supernova light curves. These are useful for standard or calibrated candles to generate Hubble diagrams and make cosmological predictions. Supernova spectroscopy, used to study the physics and environments of supernovae, is more practical at low than at high redshift. Low redshift observations also anchor the low-distance end of the Hubble curve, a plot of distance versus redshift for visible galaxies.

As survey programmes rapidly increase the number of detected supernovae, collated collections of observations (light decay curves, astrometry, pre-supernova observations, spectroscopy) have been assembled. The Pantheon data set, assembled in 2018, detailed 1048 supernovae. In 2021, this data set was expanded to 1701 light curves for 1550 supernovae taken from 18 different surveys, a 50% increase in under 3 years.

== Naming convention ==
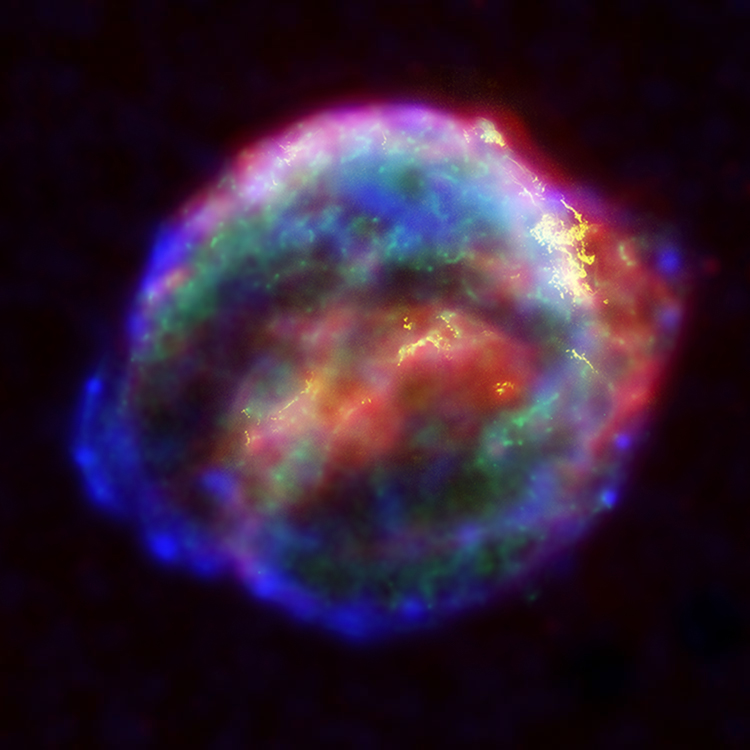
Multi-wavelength X-ray, infrared, and optical compilation image of Kepler's supernova remnant, SN 1604

Supernova discoveries are reported to the International Astronomical Union's Central Bureau for Astronomical Telegrams, which sends out a circular with the name it assigns to that supernova. The name is formed from the prefix SN, followed by the year of discovery, suffixed with a one- to four-letter designation. The first 26 supernovae of the year are designated with a capital letter from A to Z. Next, pairs of lower-case letters are used: aa, ab, and so on. After zz comes aaa, then aab, aac, and so on.

For example, SN 2003C designates the third supernova reported in the year 2003. The last reported supernova of 2005, SN 2005nc, was the 367th (14 × 26 + 3 = 367). The last supernova retained in the Asiago Supernova Catalogue when it was terminated on 31 December 2017 bears the designation SN 2017jzp. SN 2021afdx is an example of a four-letter suffix.

Historical supernovae are known simply by the year they occurred: SN 185, SN 1006, SN 1054, SN 1572 (called Tycho's Nova) and SN 1604 (Kepler's Star). Since 1885 the additional letter notation has been used, even if there was only one supernova discovered that year (for example, SN 1885A, SN 1907A, etc.); this last happened with SN 1947A.

Until 1987, two-letter designations were rarely needed; after 1988 they were needed every year. Since 2000, professional and amateur astronomers have been finding several hundred supernovae each year (572 in 2007, 261 in 2008, 390 in 2009; 231 in 2013). In 2016, the increasing number of discoveries led to the use of three-letter designations. Since 2019, the use of four-letter designations has been needed.

== Classification ==
Astronomers classify supernovae according to their light curves and the absorption lines of different chemical elements that appear in their spectra. If a supernova's spectrum contains lines of hydrogen (known as the Balmer series in the visual portion of the spectrum) it is classified Type II; otherwise it is Type I. In each of these two types there are subdivisions according to the presence of lines from other elements or the shape of the light curve (a graph of the supernova's apparent magnitude as a function of time).

Supernova taxonomy
Type I No hydrogen	Type Ia; Presents a singly ionised silicon (Si II) line at 615.0 nm (nanometers), near peak light			Thermal runaway
Type I No hydrogen	Type Ib/c; Weak or no silicon absorption feature	Type Ib; Shows a non-ionised helium (He I) line at 587.6 nm		Core collapse
Type I No hydrogen	Type Ib/c; Weak or no silicon absorption feature	Type Ic; Weak or no helium		Core collapse
Type II; Shows hydrogen	Type II-P/-L/n; Type II spectrum throughout	Type II-P/L; No narrow lines	Type II-P; Reaches a "plateau" in its light curve	Core collapse
Type II; Shows hydrogen	Type II-P/-L/n; Type II spectrum throughout	Type II-P/L; No narrow lines	Type II-L; Displays a "linear" decrease in its light curve (linear in magnitude versus time)	Core collapse
Type II; Shows hydrogen	Type II-P/-L/n; Type II spectrum throughout	Type IIn; Some narrow lines		Core collapse
Type II; Shows hydrogen	Type IIb; Spectrum changes to become like Type Ib			Core collapse

=== Type I ===
Light curve for Type Ia SN 2018gv

Type I supernovae are subdivided on the basis of their spectra, with Type Ia showing a strong ionised silicon absorption line. Type I supernovae without this strong line are classified as Type Ib and Ic, with Type Ib showing strong neutral helium lines and Type Ic lacking them. Historically, the light curves of Type I supernovae were seen as all broadly similar, too much so to make useful distinctions. While variations in light curves have been studied, classification continues to be made on spectral grounds rather than light-curve shape.

A small number of Type Ia supernovae exhibit unusual features, such as non-standard luminosity or broadened light curves, and these are typically categorised by referring to the earliest example showing similar features. For example, the sub-luminous SN 2008ha is often referred to as SN 2002cx-like or class Ia-2002cx.

A small proportion of Type Ic supernovae show highly broadened and blended emission lines which are taken to indicate very high expansion velocities for the ejecta. These have been classified as Type Ic-BL or Ic-bl.

Calcium-rich supernovae are a rare type of very fast supernova with unusually strong calcium lines in their spectra. Models suggest they occur when material is accreted from a helium-rich companion rather than a hydrogen-rich star. Because of helium lines in their spectra, they can resemble Type Ib supernovae, but are thought to have very different progenitors.

Type Ien has been proposed to explain observations of the supernova SN 2021yfj. Having lost its outer layers of hydrogen, helium and carbon, the star, just before the explosion, released an unusual, hidden layer of silicon, sulfur and argon, elements that are not often seen in dying stars. During the explosion, the material from the star's core collided with the gaseous shell, and the heat of the collision caused the silicon and sulfur layer to glow. The explosion showed that stars can be completely stripped down and still produce a brilliant explosion observable from very far distance. The discovery provided direct evidence of the long-theorized, but difficult to observe, internal structure of massive stars. In the type's name, "e" describes the position of the silicon/sulfur layer in the internal structure, while "n" signifies narrow emission lines.

=== Type II ===
Light curves are used to classify Type II-P and Type II-L supernovae.

The supernovae of Type II can also be sub-divided based on their spectra. While most Type II supernovae show very broad emission lines which indicate expansion velocities of many thousands of kilometres per second, some, such as SN 2005gl, have relatively narrow features in their spectra. These are called Type IIn, where the "n" stands for "narrow".

A few supernovae, such as SN 1987K and SN 1993J, appear to change types: they show lines of hydrogen at early times, but, over a period of weeks to months, become dominated by lines of helium. The term "Type IIb" is used to describe the combination of features normally associated with Type II and Type Ib.

Type II supernovae with normal spectra dominated by broad hydrogen lines that remain for the life of the decline are classified on the basis of their light curves. The most common type shows a distinctive "plateau" in the light curve shortly after peak brightness where the visual luminosity stays relatively constant for several months before the decline resumes. These are called Type II-P referring to the plateau. Less common are Type II-L supernovae that lack a distinct plateau. The "L" signifies "linear" although the light curve is not actually a straight line.

Supernovae that do not fit into the normal classifications are designated peculiar, or "pec".

=== Types III, IV and V ===
Zwicky defined additional supernovae types based on a very few examples that did not cleanly fit the parameters for Type I or Type II supernovae. SN 1961i in NGC 4303 was the prototype and only member of the Type III supernova class, noted for its broad light curve maximum and broad hydrogen Balmer lines that were slow to develop in the spectrum. SN 1961f in NGC 3003 was the prototype and only member of the Type IV class, with a light curve similar to a Type II-P supernova, with hydrogen absorption lines but weak hydrogen emission lines. The Type V class was coined for SN 1961V in NGC 1058, an unusual faint supernova or supernova impostor with a slow rise to brightness, a maximum lasting many months, and an unusual emission spectrum. The similarity of SN 1961V to the Eta Carinae Great Outburst was noted. Supernovae in M101 (1909) and M83 (1923 and 1957) were also suggested as possible Type IV or Type V supernovae.

These types would now all be treated as peculiar Type II supernovae (IIpec), of which many more examples have been discovered, although it is still debated whether SN 1961V was a true supernova following an LBV outburst or an impostor.

== Current models ==
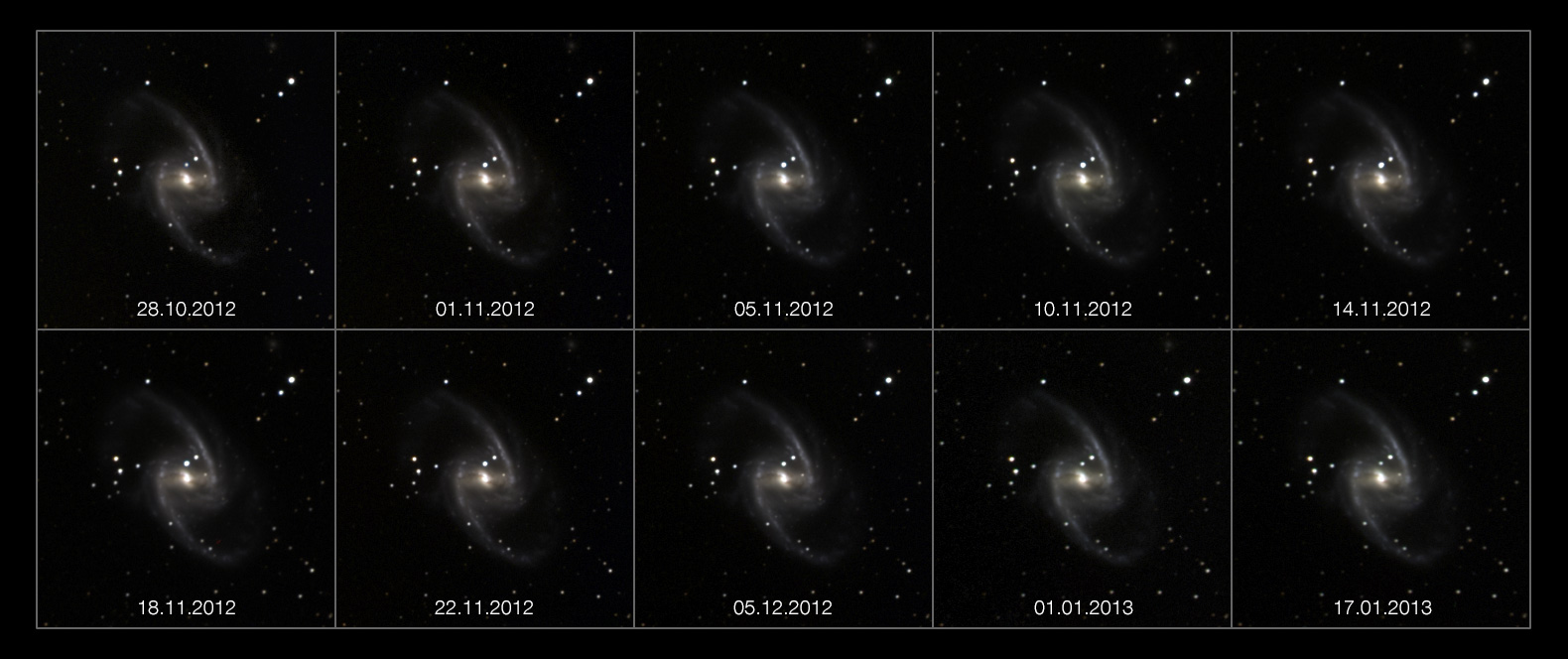
In the galaxy NGC 1365 a supernova (the bright dot slightly above the galactic center) rapidly brightens, then fades more slowly.

Supernova type codes, as summarised in the table above, are taxonomic: the type number is based on the light observed from the supernova, not necessarily its cause. For example, Type Ia supernovae are produced by runaway fusion ignited on degenerate white dwarf progenitors, while the spectrally similar Type Ib/c are produced from massive stripped progenitor stars by core collapse.

=== Thermal runaway ===
Formation of a Type Ia supernova

A white dwarf star may accumulate sufficient material from a stellar companion to raise its core temperature enough to ignite carbon fusion, at which point it undergoes runaway nuclear fusion, completely disrupting it. There are three avenues by which this detonation is theorised to happen: stable accretion of material from a companion, the collision of two white dwarfs, or accretion that causes ignition in a shell that then ignites the core. The dominant mechanism by which Type Ia supernovae are produced remains unclear. Despite this uncertainty in how Type Ia supernovae are produced, Type Ia supernovae have very uniform properties and are useful standard candles over intergalactic distances. Some calibrations are required to compensate for the gradual change in properties or different frequencies of abnormal luminosity supernovae at high redshift, and for small variations in brightness identified by light curve shape or spectrum.

==== Normal Type Ia ====
There are several means by which a supernova of this type can form, but they share a common underlying mechanism. If a carbon-oxygen white dwarf accreted enough matter to reach the Chandrasekhar limit of about 1.44 solar masses (for a non-rotating star), then it would no longer be able to support the bulk of its mass through electron degeneracy pressure and would begin to collapse. However, the current view is that this limit is not normally attained; increasing temperature and density inside the core ignite carbon fusion as the star approaches the limit (to within about 1%) before collapse is initiated. In contrast, for a core primarily composed of oxygen, neon and magnesium, the collapsing white dwarf will typically form a neutron star. In this case, only a fraction of the star's mass will be ejected during the collapse.

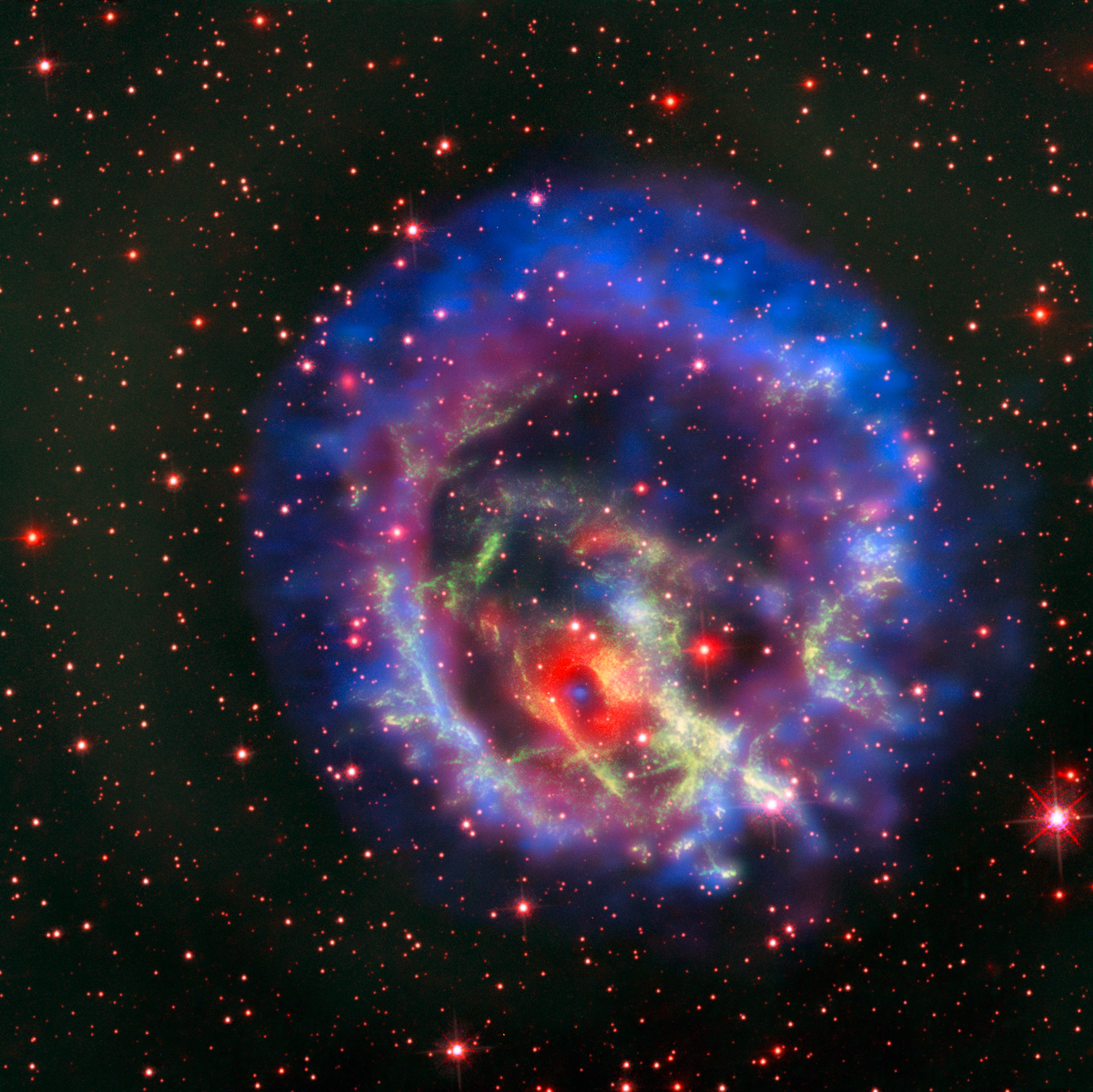
The blue spot at the centre of the red ring is an isolated neutron star in the Small Magellanic Cloud.

Within a few seconds of the collapse process, a substantial fraction of the matter in the white dwarf undergoes nuclear fusion, releasing enough energy (1–2×10^{44} J) to unbind the star in a supernova. An outwardly expanding shock wave is generated, with matter reaching velocities on the order of 5,000–20,000 km/s, or roughly 3% of the speed of light. There is also a significant increase in luminosity, reaching an absolute magnitude of −19.3 (or 5 billion times brighter than the Sun), with little variation.

The model for the formation of this category of supernova is a close binary star system. The more massive of the two stars is the first to evolve off the main sequence, and it expands to form a red giant. The two stars now share a common envelope, causing their mutual orbit to shrink. The giant star then sheds most of its envelope, losing mass until it can no longer continue nuclear fusion. At this point, it becomes a white dwarf star, composed primarily of carbon and oxygen. Eventually, the secondary star also evolves off the main sequence to form a red giant. Matter from the giant is accreted by the white dwarf, causing the latter to increase in mass. The exact details of initiation and of the heavy elements produced in the catastrophic event remain unclear.

Type Ia supernovae produce a characteristic light curve—the graph of luminosity as a function of time—after the event. This luminosity is generated by the radioactive decay of ^{56}Ni through ^{56}Co to ^{56}Fe. The peak luminosity of the light curve is extremely consistent across normal Type Ia supernovae, having a maximum absolute magnitude of about −19.3. This is because typical Type Ia supernovae arise from a consistent type of progenitor star by gradual mass acquisition, and explode when they acquire a consistent typical mass, giving rise to very similar supernova conditions and behaviour. This allows them to be used as a secondary standard candle to measure the distance to their host galaxies.

A second model for the formation of Type Ia supernovae involves the merger of two white dwarf stars, with the combined mass momentarily exceeding the Chandrasekhar limit. This is sometimes referred to as the double-degenerate model, as both stars are degenerate white dwarfs. Due to the possible combinations of mass and chemical composition of the pair there is much variation in this type of event, and, in many cases, there may be no supernova at all, in which case they will have a less luminous light curve than the more normal SN Type Ia.

==== Non-standard Type Ia ====
Abnormally bright Type Ia supernovae occur when the white dwarf already has a mass higher than the Chandrasekhar limit, possibly enhanced further by asymmetry, but the ejected material will have less than normal kinetic energy. This super-Chandrasekhar-mass scenario can occur, for example, when the extra mass is supported by differential rotation.

There is no formal sub-classification for non-standard Type Ia supernovae. It has been proposed that a group of sub-luminous supernovae that occur when helium accretes onto a white dwarf should be classified as Type Iax. This type of supernova may not always completely destroy the white dwarf progenitor and could leave behind a zombie star.

One specific type of supernova originates from exploding white dwarfs, like Type Ia, but contains hydrogen lines in their spectra, possibly because the white dwarf is surrounded by an envelope of hydrogen-rich circumstellar material. These supernovae have been dubbed Type Ia/IIn, Type Ian, Type IIa and Type IIan, with the type Ia-CSM label being more widely used for these objects in the modern literature.

The quadruple star HD 74438, belonging to the open cluster IC 2391 in the constellation Vela, has been predicted to become a non-standard Type Ia supernova.

=== Core collapse ===
The layers of a massive, evolved star just before core collapse (not to scale).

Very massive stars can undergo core collapse when nuclear fusion becomes unable to sustain the core against its own gravity; passing this threshold is the cause of all types of supernova except Type Ia. The collapse may cause violent expulsion of the outer layers of the star resulting in a supernova. However, if the release of gravitational potential energy is insufficient, the star may instead collapse into a black hole or neutron star with little radiated energy.

Core collapse can be caused by several different mechanisms: exceeding the Chandrasekhar limit; electron capture; pair-instability; or photodisintegration.

- When a massive star develops an iron core larger than the Chandrasekhar mass it will no longer be able to support itself by electron degeneracy pressure and will collapse further to a neutron star or black hole.
- Electron capture by magnesium in a degenerate O/Ne/Mg core (about 9–10 solar mass progenitor star under solar Z) removes support and causes gravitational collapse followed by explosive oxygen fusion, with very similar results.
- Electron-positron pair production in a large post-helium burning core removes thermodynamic support and causes initial collapse followed by runaway fusion, resulting in a pair-instability supernova.
- A sufficiently large and hot stellar core may generate gamma-rays energetic enough to initiate photodisintegration directly, which will cause a complete collapse of the core.

The table below lists the known reasons for core collapse in massive stars, the types of stars in which they occur, their associated supernova type, and the remnant produced. The metallicity is the proportion of elements other than hydrogen or helium, as compared to the Sun. The initial mass is the mass of the star prior to the supernova event, given in multiples of the Sun's mass, although the mass at the time of the supernova may be much lower.

Core collapse scenarios by mass and metallicity
Cause of collapse	Progenitor star approximate initial mass (solar masses)	Supernova type	Remnant
Electron capture in a degenerate O+Ne+Mg core	9–10	Faint II-P	Neutron star
Iron core collapse	10–25	Faint II-P	Neutron star
Iron core collapse	25–40 with low or solar metallicity	Normal II-P	Black hole after fallback of material onto an initial neutron star
Iron core collapse	25–40 with very high metallicity	II-L or II-b	Neutron star
Iron core collapse	40–90 with low metallicity	None	Black hole
Iron core collapse	≥ 40 with near-solar metallicity	Faint Ib/c, or hypernova with gamma-ray burst (GRB)	Black hole after fallback of material onto an initial neutron star
Iron core collapse	≥ 40 with very high metallicity	Ib/c	Neutron star
Iron core collapse	≥ 90 with low metallicity	None, possible GRB	Black hole
Pair instability	140–250 with low metallicity	II-P, sometimes a hypernova, possible GRB	No remnant
Photodisintegration	≥ 250 with low metallicity	None (or luminous supernova?), possible GRB	Massive black hole

Type IIn supernovae are not listed in the table. They can be produced by various types of core collapse in different progenitor stars, possibly even by Type Ia white dwarf ignitions, although it seems that most will be from iron core collapse in luminous supergiants or hypergiants (including LBVs). The narrow spectral lines for which they are named occur because the supernova is expanding into a small dense cloud of circumstellar material. It appears that a significant proportion of supposed Type IIn supernovae are supernova impostors, massive eruptions of LBV-like stars similar to the Great Eruption of Eta Carinae. In these events, material previously ejected from the star creates the narrow absorption lines and causes a shock wave through interaction with the newly ejected material.

==== Detailed process ====
Within a massive, evolved star (a) the onion-layered shells of elements undergo fusion, forming an iron core (b) that reaches Chandrasekhar-mass and starts to collapse. The inner part of the core is compressed into neutrons (c), causing infalling material to bounce (d) and form an outward-propagating shock front (red). The shock starts to stall (e), but it is re-invigorated, likely by neutrino heating. The surrounding material is blasted away (f), leaving only a degenerate remnant.

When a stellar core is no longer supported against gravity, it collapses in on itself with velocities reaching 70,000 km/s (0.23c), resulting in a rapid increase in temperature and density. What follows depends on the mass and structure of the collapsing core, with low-mass degenerate cores forming neutron stars, higher-mass degenerate cores mostly collapsing completely to black holes, and non-degenerate cores undergoing runaway fusion.

The initial collapse of degenerate cores is accelerated by beta decay, photodisintegration and electron capture, which causes a burst of electron neutrinos. As the density increases, neutrino emission is cut off as they become trapped in the core. The inner core eventually reaches typically 30 km in diameter with a density comparable to that of an atomic nucleus, and neutron degeneracy pressure tries to halt the collapse. If the core mass is more than about 15 solar masses then neutron degeneracy is insufficient to stop the collapse and a black hole forms directly with no supernova.

In lower mass cores the collapse is stopped and the newly formed neutron core has an initial temperature of about 100 billion Ks, 6,000 times the temperature of the Sun's core. At this temperature, neutrino-antineutrino pairs of all flavours are efficiently formed by thermal emission. These thermal neutrinos are several times more abundant than the electron-capture neutrinos. About 10^{46} joules, approximately 10% of the star's rest mass, is converted into a ten-second burst of neutrinos, which is the main output of the event. The suddenly halted core collapse rebounds and produces a shock wave that stalls in the outer core within milliseconds as energy is lost through the dissociation of heavy elements. A process that is not clearly understood is necessary to allow the outer layers of the core to reabsorb around 10^{44} joules (1 foe) from the neutrino pulse, producing the visible brightness, although there are other theories that could power the explosion.

Some material from the outer envelope falls back onto the neutron star, and, for cores beyond about 8 M_{☉}, there is sufficient fallback to form a black hole. This fallback will reduce the kinetic energy created and the mass of expelled radioactive material, but in some situations, it may also generate relativistic jets that result in a gamma-ray burst or an exceptionally luminous supernova.

The collapse of a massive non-degenerate core will ignite further fusion. When the core collapse is initiated by pair instability (photons turning into electron-positron pairs, thereby reducing the radiation pressure) oxygen fusion begins and the collapse may be halted. For core masses of 40–60 M_{☉}, the collapse halts and the star remains intact, but collapse will occur again when a larger core has formed. For cores of around 60–130 M_{☉}, the fusion of oxygen and heavier elements is so energetic that the entire star is disrupted, causing a supernova. At the upper end of the mass range, the supernova is unusually luminous and extremely long-lived due to many solar masses of ejected ^{56}Ni. For even larger core masses, the core temperature becomes high enough to allow photodisintegration and the core collapses completely into a black hole.

==== Type II ====
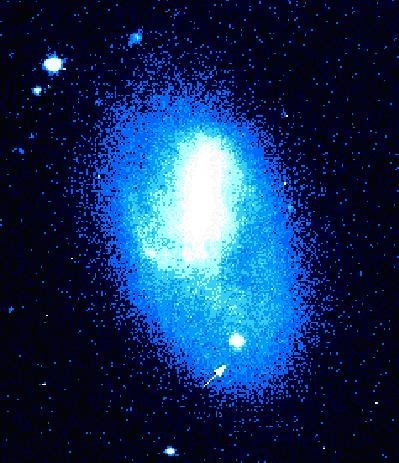
The atypical subluminous Type II SN 1997D

Stars with initial masses less than about 8 M_{☉} never develop a core large enough to collapse and they eventually lose their atmospheres to become white dwarfs. Stars with at least 9 M_{☉} (possibly as much as 12 M_{☉}) evolve in a complex fashion, progressively burning heavier elements at hotter temperatures in their cores. The star becomes layered like an onion, with the burning of more easily fused elements occurring in larger shells. Although popularly described as an onion with an iron core, the least massive supernova progenitors only have oxygen-neon(-magnesium) cores. These super-AGB stars may form the majority of core collapse supernovae, although less luminous and so less commonly observed than those from more massive progenitors.

If core collapse occurs during a supergiant phase when the star still has a hydrogen envelope, the result is a Type II supernova. The rate of mass loss for luminous stars depends on the metallicity and luminosity. Extremely luminous stars at near solar metallicity will lose all their hydrogen before they reach core collapse and so will not form a supernova of Type II. At low metallicity, all stars will reach core collapse with a hydrogen envelope but sufficiently massive stars collapse directly to a black hole without producing a visible supernova.

Stars with an initial mass up to about 90 times the Sun, or a little less at high metallicity, result in a Type II-P supernova, which is the most commonly observed type. At moderate to high metallicity, stars near the upper end of that mass range will have lost most of their hydrogen when core collapse occurs and the result will be a Type II-L supernova. At very low metallicity, stars of around 140–250 M_{☉} will reach core collapse by pair instability while they still have a hydrogen atmosphere and an oxygen core and the result will be a supernova with Type II characteristics but a very large mass of ejected ^{56}Ni and high luminosity.

==== Type Ib and Ic ====
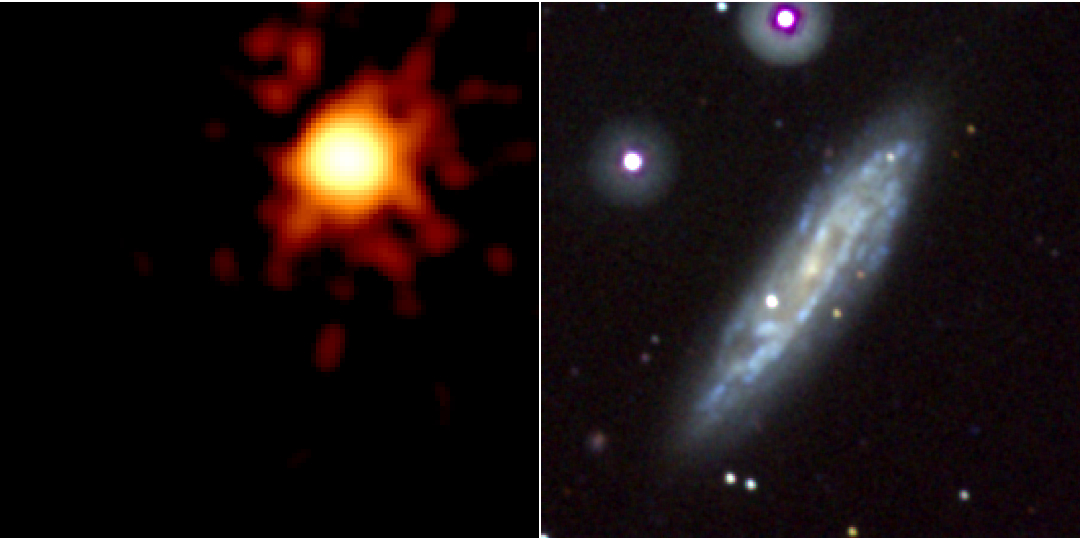
Type Ib SN 2008D at the far upper end of the galaxy, shown in X-ray (left) and visible light (right), with the brighter SN 2007uy closer to the centre

These supernovae, like those of Type II, are massive stars that undergo core collapse. Unlike the progenitors of Type II supernovae, the stars which become Type Ib and Type Ic supernovae have lost most of their outer (hydrogen) envelopes due to strong stellar winds or else from interaction with a companion. These stars are known as Wolf–Rayet stars, and they occur at moderate to high metallicity where continuum driven winds cause sufficiently high mass-loss rates. Observations of Type Ib/c supernova do not match the observed or expected occurrence of Wolf–Rayet stars. Alternate explanations for this type of core collapse supernova involve stars stripped of their hydrogen by binary interactions. Binary models provide a better match for the observed supernovae, with the proviso that no suitable binary helium stars have ever been observed.

Type Ib supernovae are more common than Type Ic and they result from Wolf–Rayet stars of type WC which still have helium in their atmospheres. For a narrow range of masses, stars evolve further before reaching core collapse to become WO stars with very little helium remaining, and these are the progenitors of Type Ic supernovae.

A few percent of the Type Ic supernovae are associated with gamma-ray bursts (GRB), though it is also believed that any hydrogen-stripped Type Ib or Ic supernova could produce a GRB, depending on the circumstances of the geometry. The mechanism for producing this type of GRB is the jets produced by the magnetic field of the rapidly spinning magnetar formed at the collapsing core of the star. The jets would also transfer energy into the expanding outer shell, producing a super-luminous supernova.

Ultra-stripped supernovae occur when the exploding star has been stripped (almost) all the way to the metal core, via mass transfer in a close binary. As a result, very little material is ejected from the exploding star (c. 0.1 M_{☉}). In the most extreme cases, ultra-stripped supernovae can occur in naked metal cores, barely above the Chandrasekhar mass limit. SN 2005ek might be the first observational example of an ultra-stripped supernova, giving rise to a relatively dim and fast decaying light curve. The nature of ultra-stripped supernovae can be both iron core-collapse and electron capture supernovae, depending on the mass of the collapsing core. Ultra-stripped supernovae are believed to be associated with the second supernova explosion in a binary system, producing for example a tight double neutron star system.

In 2022 a team of astronomers led by researchers from the Weizmann Institute of Science reported the first supernova explosion showing direct evidence for a Wolf-Rayet progenitor star. SN 2019hgp was a Type Icn supernova and is also the first in which the element neon has been detected.

==== Electron-capture supernovae ====
In 1980, a "third type" of supernova was predicted by Ken'ichi Nomoto of the University of Tokyo, called an electron-capture supernova. It would arise when a star "in the transitional range (~8 to 10 solar masses) between white dwarf formation and iron core-collapse supernovae", and with a degenerate O+Ne+Mg core, imploded after its core ran out of nuclear fuel, causing gravity to compress the electrons in the star's core into their atomic nuclei, leading to a supernova explosion and leaving behind a neutron star. In June 2021, a paper in the journal Nature Astronomy reported that the 2018 supernova SN 2018zd (in the galaxy NGC 2146, about 31 million light-years from Earth) appeared to be the first observation of an electron-capture supernova. The 1054 supernova explosion that created the Crab Nebula in our galaxy had been thought to be the best candidate for an electron-capture supernova, and the 2021 paper makes it more likely that this was correct.

=== Failed supernovae ===
The core collapse of some massive stars may not result in a visible supernova. This happens if the initial core collapse cannot be reversed by the mechanism that produces an explosion, usually because the core is too massive. These events are difficult to detect, but large surveys have detected possible candidates. The red supergiant N6946-BH1 in NGC 6946 underwent a modest outburst in March 2009, before fading from view. Only a faint infrared source remains at the star's location.

=== Light curves ===
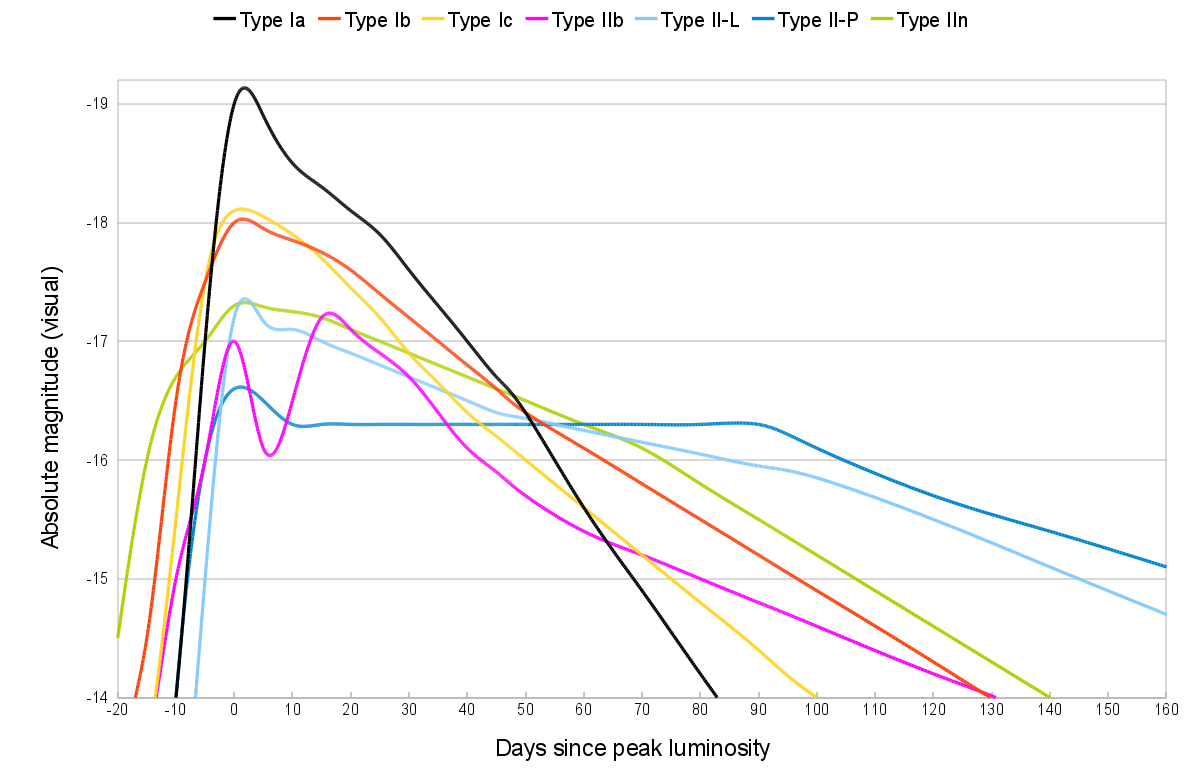
Typical light curves for several types of supernovae; in practice, magnitude and duration varies within each type. See Karttunen et al. for Type Ia, Ib, II-L and II-P; Modjaz et al. for Type Ic and IIb; and Nyholm et al. for Type IIn.

The material ejected by a supernova would dim quickly without some energy input to keep them hot. The source of this energy—which can maintain the optical emission for months—was, at first, a puzzle. Some considered rotational energy from the central pulsar as a source. Although the energy that initially powers each type of supernovae is delivered promptly, the light curves are dominated by subsequent radioactive heating of the rapidly expanding ejecta. The intensely radioactive nature of the ejecta gases was first calculated on sound nucleosynthesis grounds in the late 1960s, and this has since been demonstrated as correct for most supernovae. It was not until SN 1987A that direct observation of gamma-ray lines unambiguously identified the major radioactive nuclei.

It is now known by direct observation that much of the light curve (the graph of luminosity as a function of time) after the occurrence of a type II supernova, such as SN 1987A, is explained by those predicted radioactive decays. Although the luminous emission consists of optical photons, it is the radioactive power absorbed by the ejected gases that keeps the remnant hot enough to radiate light. The radioactive decay of ^{56}Ni through its daughters ^{56}Co to ^{56}Fe produces gamma-ray photons, primarily with energies of 847 keV and 1,238 keV, that are absorbed and dominate the heating and thus the luminosity of the ejecta at intermediate times (several weeks) to late times (several months). Energy for the peak of the light curve of SN1987A was provided by the decay of ^{56}Ni to ^{56}Co (half-life 6 days) while energy for the later light curve in particular fit very closely with the 77.3-day half-life of ^{56}Co decaying to ^{56}Fe. Later measurements by space gamma-ray telescopes of the small fraction of the ^{56}Co and ^{57}Co gamma rays that escaped the SN 1987A remnant without absorption confirmed earlier predictions that those two radioactive nuclei were the power sources.

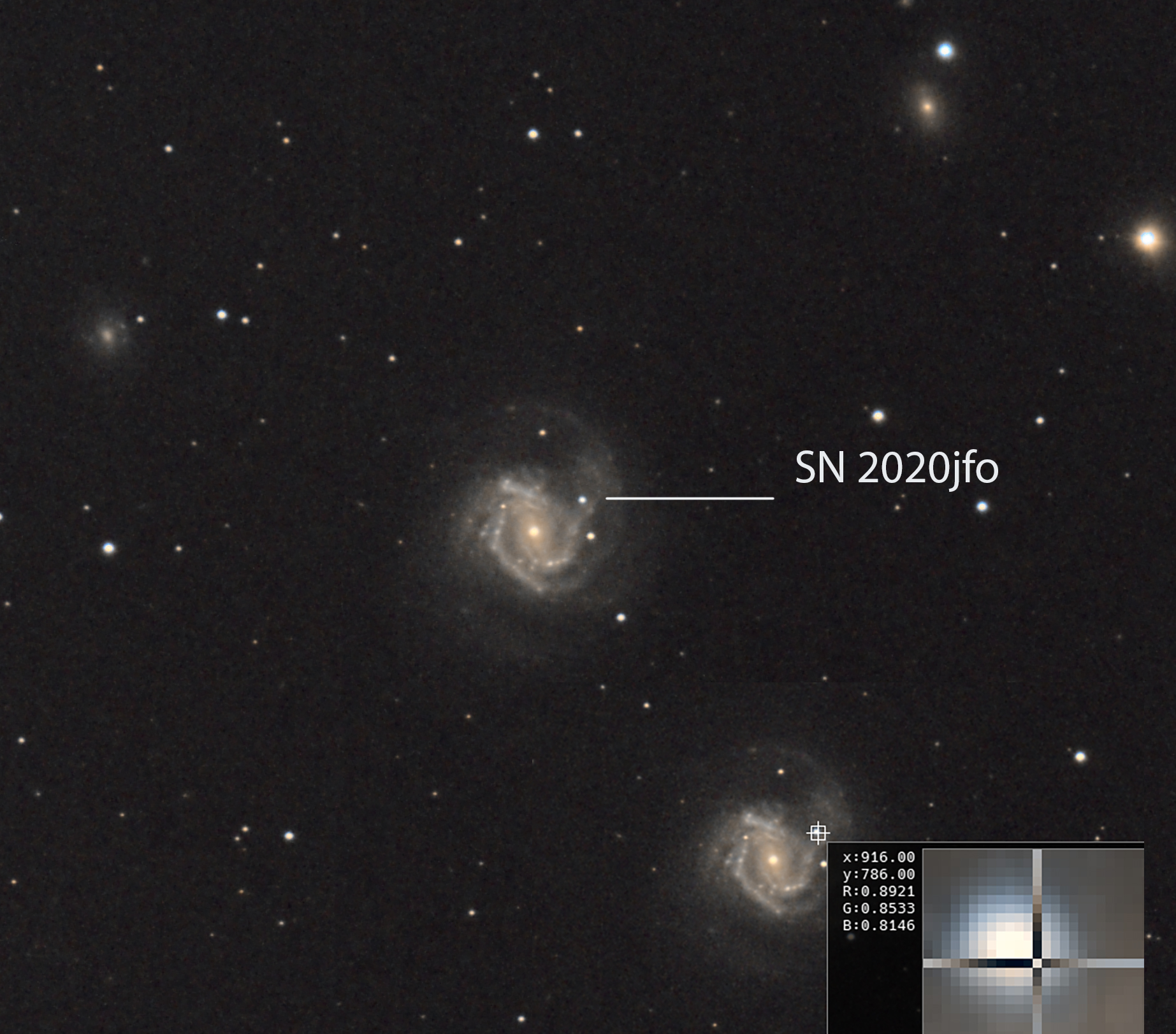
Messier 61 with supernova SN2020jfo, taken by an amateur astronomer in 2020

The late-time decay phase of visual light curves for different supernova types all depend on radioactive heating, but they vary in shape and amplitude because of the underlying mechanisms, the way that visible radiation is produced, the epoch of its observation, and the transparency of the ejected material. The light curves can be significantly different at other wavelengths. For example, at ultraviolet wavelengths there is an early extremely luminous peak lasting only a few hours corresponding to the breakout of the shock launched by the initial event, but that breakout is hardly detectable optically.

The light curves for Type Ia are mostly very uniform, with a consistent maximum absolute magnitude and a relatively steep decline in luminosity. Their optical energy output is driven by radioactive decay of ejected ^{56}Ni (half-life 6 days), which then decays to radioactive ^{56}Co (half-life 77 days). These radioisotopes excite the surrounding material to incandescence. Modern studies of cosmology rely on ^{56}Ni radioactivity providing the energy for the optical brightness of supernovae of Type Ia, which are the "standard candles" of cosmology but whose diagnostic 847 keV and 1,238 keV gamma rays were first detected only in 2014. The initial phases of the light curve decline steeply as the effective size of the photosphere decreases and trapped electromagnetic radiation is depleted. The light curve continues to decline in the B band while it may show a small shoulder in the visual at about 40 days, but this is only a hint of a secondary maximum that occurs in the infra-red as certain ionised heavy elements recombine to produce infra-red radiation and the ejecta become transparent to it. The visual light curve continues to decline at a rate slightly greater than the decay rate of the radioactive cobalt (which has the longer half-life and controls the later curve), because the ejected material becomes more diffuse and less able to convert the high energy radiation into visual radiation. After several months, the light curve changes its decline rate again as positron emission from the remaining ^{56}Co becomes dominant, although this portion of the light curve has been little-studied.

Type Ib and Ic light curves are similar to type Ia although with a lower average peak luminosity. The visual light output is again due to radioactive decay being converted into visual radiation, but there is a much lower mass of the created ^{56}Ni. The peak luminosity varies considerably and there are even occasional Type Ib/c supernovae orders of magnitude more and less luminous than the norm. The most luminous Type Ic supernovae are referred to as hypernovae and tend to have broadened light curves in addition to the increased peak luminosity. The source of the extra energy is thought to be relativistic jets driven by the formation of a rotating black hole, which also produce gamma-ray bursts.

The light curves for type II supernovae are characterised by a much slower decline than Type I, on the order of 0.05 magnitudes per day, excluding the plateau phase. The visual light output is dominated by kinetic energy rather than radioactive decay for several months, due primarily to the existence of hydrogen in the ejecta from the atmosphere of the supergiant progenitor star. In the initial destruction this hydrogen becomes heated and ionised. The majority of Type II supernovae show a prolonged plateau in their light curves as this hydrogen recombines, emitting visible light and becoming more transparent. This is then followed by a declining light curve driven by radioactive decay although slower than in type I supernovae, due to the efficiency of conversion into light by all the hydrogen.

In type II-L the plateau is absent because the progenitor had relatively little hydrogen left in its atmosphere, sufficient to appear in the spectrum but insufficient to produce a noticeable plateau in the light output. In type IIb supernovae the hydrogen atmosphere of the progenitor is so depleted (thought to be due to tidal stripping by a companion star) that the light curve is closer to a Type I supernova and the hydrogen even disappears from the spectrum after several weeks.

Type IIn supernovae are characterised by additional narrow spectral lines produced in a dense shell of circumstellar material. Their light curves are generally very broad and extended, occasionally also extremely luminous and referred to as a superluminous supernova. These light curves are produced by the highly efficient conversion of kinetic energy of the ejecta into electromagnetic radiation by interaction with the dense shell of material. This only occurs when the material is sufficiently dense and compact, indicating that it has been produced by the progenitor star itself only shortly before the supernova occurs.

Large numbers of supernovae have been catalogued and classified to provide distance candles and test models. Average characteristics vary somewhat with distance and type of host galaxy, but can broadly be specified for each supernova type.

Physical properties of supernovae by type
Type^{a}	Average peak absolute magnitude^{b}	Approximate energy (foe)^{c}	Days to peak luminosity	Days from peak to 10% luminosity
Ia	−19	1	approx. 19	around 60
Ib/c (faint)	around −15	0.1	15–25	unknown
Ib	around −17	1	15–25	40–100
Ic	around −16	1	15–25	40–100
Ic (bright)	to −22	above 5	roughly 25	roughly 100
II-b	around −17	1	around 20	around 100
II-L	around −17	1	around 13	around 150
II-P (faint)	around −14	0.1	roughly 15	unknown
II-P	around −16	1	around 15	Plateau then around 50
IIn^{d}	around −17	1	12–30 or more	50–150
IIn (bright)	to −22	above 5	above 50	above 100

Notes:

1. Faint types may be a distinct sub-class. Bright types may be a continuum from slightly over-luminous to hypernovae.
2. These magnitudes are measured in the R band. Measurements in V or B bands are common and will be around half a magnitude brighter for supernovae.
3. Order of magnitude kinetic energy. Total electromagnetic radiated energy is usually lower, (theoretical) neutrino energy much higher.
4. Probably a heterogeneous group, any of the other types embedded in nebulosity.

=== Asymmetry ===
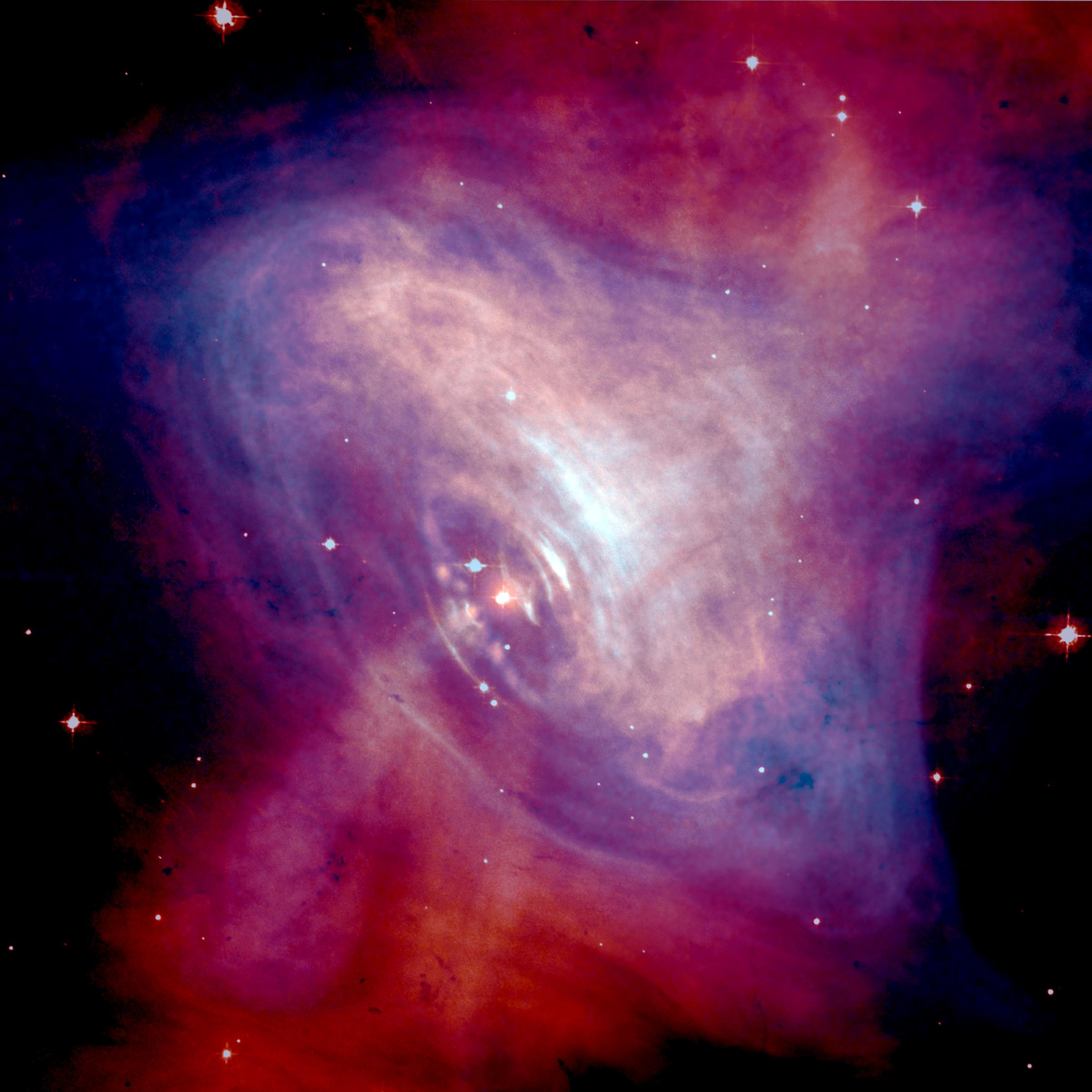
The pulsar in the Crab Nebula is travelling at 375 km/s relative to the nebula.

A long-standing puzzle surrounding type II supernovae is why the remaining compact object receives a large velocity away from the centre of mass; pulsars, and thus neutron stars, are observed to have high peculiar velocities, and black holes presumably do as well, although they are far harder to observe in isolation. The initial impetus can be substantial, propelling an object of more than a solar mass at a velocity of 500 km/s or greater. This indicates an expansion asymmetry, but the mechanism by which momentum is transferred to the compact object remains a puzzle. Proposed explanations for this kick include convection in the collapsing star, asymmetric ejection of matter during neutron star formation, and asymmetrical neutrino emissions.

One possible explanation for this asymmetry is large-scale convection above the core. The convection can create radial variations in density giving rise to variations in the amount of energy absorbed from neutrino outflow. However analysis of this mechanism predicts only modest momentum transfer. Another possible explanation is that accretion of gas onto the central neutron star can create a disk that drives highly directional jets, propelling matter at a high velocity out of the star, and driving transverse shocks that completely disrupt the star. These jets might play a crucial role in the resulting supernova. (A similar model is used for explaining long gamma-ray bursts.) The dominant mechanism may depend upon the mass of the progenitor star.

Initial asymmetries have also been confirmed in type Ia supernovae through observation. This result may mean that the initial luminosity of this type of supernova depends on the viewing angle. However, the expansion becomes more symmetrical with the passage of time. Early asymmetries are detectable by measuring the polarisation of the emitted light.

=== Energy output ===
The radioactive decays of ^{56}Ni and ^{56}Co that produce a supernova visible light curve

Although supernovae are primarily known as luminous events, the electromagnetic radiation they release is almost a minor side-effect. Particularly in the case of core collapse supernovae, the emitted electromagnetic radiation is a tiny fraction of the total energy released during the event.

There is a fundamental difference between the balance of energy production in the different types of supernova. In Type Ia white dwarf detonations, most of the energy is directed into heavy element synthesis and the kinetic energy of the ejecta. In core collapse supernovae, the vast majority of the energy is directed into neutrino emission, and while some of this apparently powers the observed destruction, 99%+ of the neutrinos escape the star in the first few minutes following the start of the collapse.

Standard Type Ia supernovae derive their energy from a runaway nuclear fusion of a carbon-oxygen white dwarf. The details of the energetics are still not fully understood, but the result is the ejection of the entire mass of the original star at high kinetic energy. Around half a solar mass of that mass is ^{56}Ni generated from silicon burning. ^{56}Ni is radioactive and decays into ^{56}Co by beta plus decay (with a half life of six days) and gamma rays. ^{56}Co itself decays by the beta plus (positron) path with a half-life of 77 days into stable ^{56}Fe. These two processes are responsible for the electromagnetic radiation from Type Ia supernovae. In combination with the changing transparency of the ejected material, they produce the rapidly declining light curve.

Core collapse supernovae are on average visually fainter than Type Ia supernovae, but the total energy released is far higher, as outlined in the following table.

Energetics of supernovae
Supernova	Approximate total energy x10^{44} joules (foe)^{c}	Ejected Ni (solar masses)	Neutrino energy (foe)	Kinetic energy (foe)	Electromagnetic radiation (foe)
Type Ia	1.5	0.4 – 0.8	0.1	1.3 – 1.4	~0.01
Core collapse	100	(0.01) – 1	100	1	0.001 – 0.01
Hypernova	100	~1	1–100	1–100	~0.1
Pair instability	5–100	0.5 – 50	low?	1–100	0.01 – 0.1

In some core collapse supernovae, fallback onto a black hole drives relativistic jets which may produce a brief energetic and directional burst of gamma rays and also transfers substantial further energy into the ejected material. This is one scenario for producing high-luminosity supernovae and is thought to be the cause of Type Ic hypernovae and long-duration gamma-ray bursts. If the relativistic jets are too brief and fail to penetrate the stellar envelope then a low-luminosity gamma-ray burst may be produced and the supernova may be sub-luminous.

When a supernova occurs inside a small dense cloud of circumstellar material, it will produce a shock wave that can efficiently convert a high fraction of the kinetic energy into electromagnetic radiation. Even though the initial energy was entirely normal the resulting supernova will have high luminosity and extended duration since it does not rely on exponential radioactive decay. This type of event may cause Type IIn hypernovae.

Although pair-instability supernovae are core collapse supernovae with spectra and light curves similar to Type II-P, the nature after core collapse is more like that of a giant Type Ia with runaway fusion of carbon, oxygen and silicon. The total energy released by the highest-mass events is comparable to other core collapse supernovae but neutrino production is thought to be very low, hence the kinetic and electromagnetic energy released is very high. The cores of these stars are much larger than any white dwarf and the amount of radioactive nickel and other heavy elements ejected from their cores can be orders of magnitude higher, with consequently high visual luminosity.

=== Progenitor ===
Occasional supernovae appear in this sped-up artist's impression of distant galaxies. Each exploding star briefly rivals the brightness of its host galaxy.

The supernova classification type is closely tied to the type of progenitor star at the time of the collapse. The occurrence of each type of supernova depends on the star's metallicity, since this affects the strength of the stellar wind and thereby the rate at which the star loses mass.

Type Ia supernovae are produced from white dwarf stars in binary star systems and occur in all galaxy types. Core collapse supernovae are only found in galaxies undergoing current or very recent star formation, since they result from short-lived massive stars. They are most commonly found in type Sc spirals, but also in the arms of other spiral galaxies and in irregular galaxies, especially starburst galaxies.

Type Ib and Ic supernovae are hypothesised to have been produced by core collapse of massive stars that have lost their outer layer of hydrogen and helium, either via strong stellar winds or mass transfer to a companion. They normally occur in regions of new star formation, and are extremely rare in elliptical galaxies. The progenitors of Type IIn supernovae also have high rates of mass loss in the period just prior to their explosions. Type Ic supernovae have been observed to occur in regions that are more metal-rich and have higher star-formation rates than average for their host galaxies. The table shows the progenitor for the main types of core collapse supernova, and the approximate proportions that have been observed in the local neighbourhood.

Fraction of core collapse supernovae types by progenitor
Type	Progenitor star	Fraction
Ib	WC Wolf–Rayet or helium star	9.0%
Ic	WO Wolf–Rayet	17.0%
II-P	Supergiant	55.5%
II-L	Supergiant with a depleted hydrogen shell	3.0%
IIn	Supergiant in a dense cloud of expelled material (such as LBV)	2.4%
IIb	Supergiant with highly depleted hydrogen (stripped by companion?)	12.1%
IIpec	Blue supergiant	1.0%

Supernova types by initial mass-metallicity

Remnants of single massive stars

There are a number of difficulties reconciling modelled and observed stellar evolution leading up to core collapse supernovae. Red supergiants are the progenitors for the vast majority of core collapse supernovae, and these have been observed but only at relatively low masses and luminosities, below about 18 M_{☉} and 100,000 L_{☉}, respectively. Most progenitors of Type II supernovae are not detected and must be considerably fainter, and presumably less massive. This discrepancy has been referred to as the red supergiant problem. It was first described in 2009 by Stephen Smartt, who also coined the term. After performing a volume-limited search for supernovae, Smartt et al. found the lower and upper mass limits for Type II-P supernovae to form to be 8.5+1
−1.5 M_{☉} and 16.5±1.5 M_{☉}, respectively. The former is consistent with the expected upper mass limits for white dwarf progenitors to form, but the latter is not consistent with massive star populations in the Local Group. The upper limit for red supergiants that produce a visible supernova explosion has been calculated at 19+4
−2 M_{☉}.

It is thought that higher mass red supergiants do not explode as supernovae, but instead evolve back towards hotter temperatures. Several progenitors of Type IIb supernovae have been confirmed, and these were K and G supergiants, plus one A supergiant. Yellow hypergiants or LBVs are proposed progenitors for Type IIb supernovae, and almost all Type IIb supernovae near enough to observe have shown such progenitors.

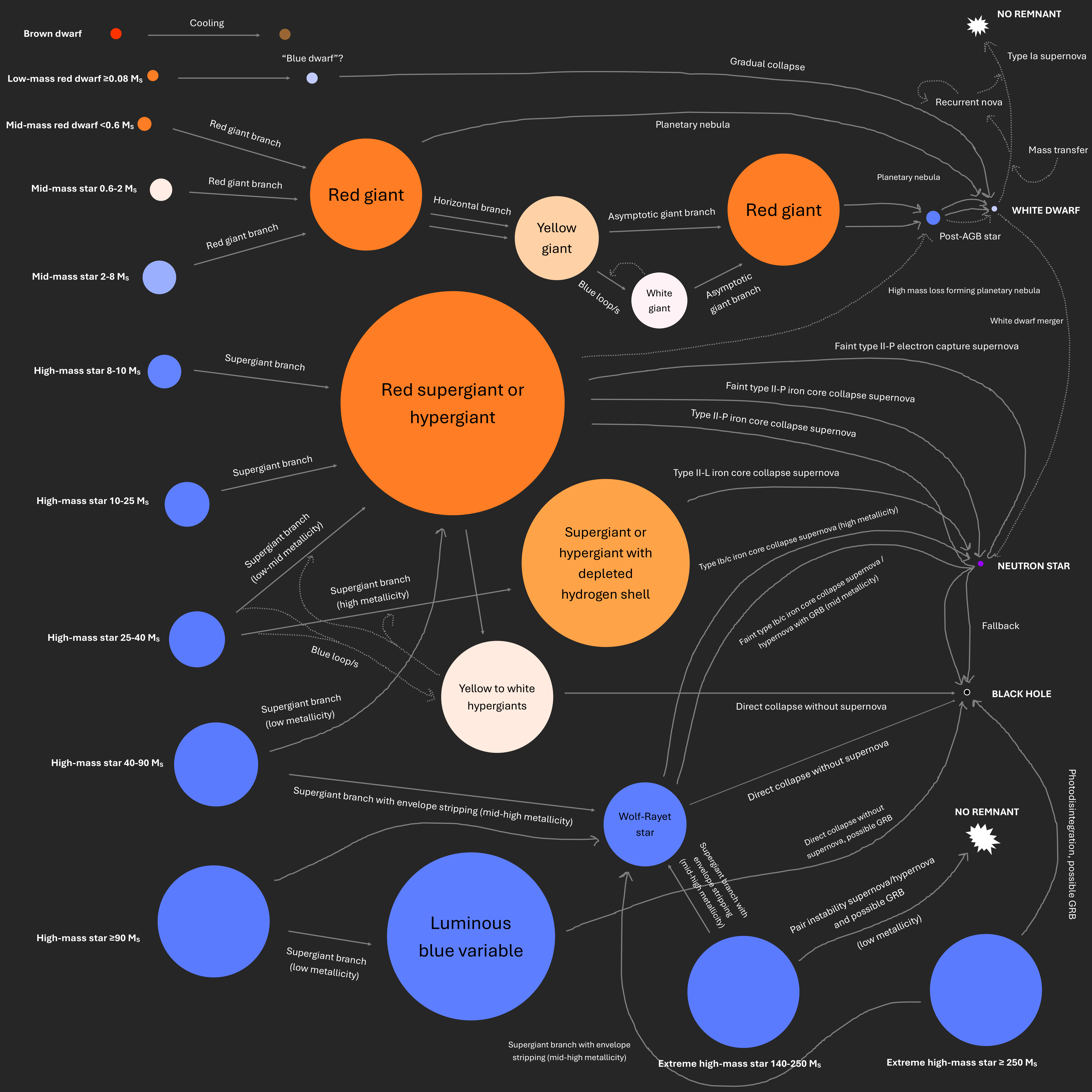
Approximate stellar evolution pathways of supernova progenitor stars (and lower mass stars) with circle size reflecting relative size and color related to temperature

Blue supergiants form an unexpectedly high proportion of confirmed supernova progenitors, partly due to their high luminosity and easy detection, while not a single Wolf–Rayet progenitor has yet been clearly identified. Models have had difficulty showing how blue supergiants lose enough mass to reach supernova without progressing to a different evolutionary stage. One study has shown a possible route for low-luminosity post-red supergiant luminous blue variables to collapse, most likely as a Type IIn supernova. Several examples of hot luminous progenitors of Type IIn supernovae have been detected: SN 2005gy and SN 2010jl were both apparently massive luminous stars, but are very distant; and SN 2009ip had a highly luminous progenitor likely to have been an LBV, but is a peculiar supernova whose exact nature is disputed.

The progenitors of Type Ib/c supernovae are not observed at all, and constraints on their possible luminosity are often lower than those of known WC stars. WO stars are extremely rare and visually relatively faint, so it is difficult to say whether such progenitors are missing or just yet to be observed. Very luminous progenitors have not been securely identified, despite numerous supernovae being observed near enough that such progenitors would have been clearly imaged. Population modelling shows that the observed Type Ib/c supernovae could be reproduced by a mixture of single massive stars and stripped-envelope stars from interacting binary systems. The continued lack of unambiguous detection of progenitors for normal Type Ib and Ic supernovae may be due to most massive stars collapsing directly to a black hole without a supernova outburst. Most of these supernovae are then produced from lower-mass low-luminosity helium stars in binary systems. A small number would be from rapidly rotating massive stars, likely corresponding to the highly energetic Type Ic-BL events that are associated with long-duration gamma-ray bursts.

== External impact ==
Supernovae events generate heavier elements that are scattered throughout the surrounding interstellar medium. The expanding shock wave from a supernova can trigger star formation. Galactic cosmic rays are generated by supernova explosions.

=== Source of heavy elements ===
Periodic table showing the source of each element in the interstellar medium

Supernovae are a major source of elements in the interstellar medium from oxygen through to rubidium, though the theoretical abundances of the elements produced or seen in the spectra varies significantly depending on the various supernova types. Type Ia supernovae produce mainly silicon and iron-peak elements, metals such as nickel and iron. Core collapse supernovae eject much smaller quantities of the iron-peak elements than Type Ia supernovae, but larger masses of light alpha elements such as oxygen and neon, and elements heavier than zinc. The latter is especially true with electron capture supernovae. The bulk of the material ejected by Type II supernovae is hydrogen and helium. The heavy elements are produced by: nuclear fusion for nuclei up to ^{34}S; silicon photodisintegration rearrangement and quasiequilibrium during silicon burning for nuclei between ^{36}Ar and ^{56}Ni; and rapid capture of neutrons (r-process) during the supernova's collapse for elements heavier than iron. The r-process produces highly unstable nuclei that are rich in neutrons and that rapidly beta decay into more stable forms. In supernovae, r-process reactions are responsible for about half of all the isotopes of elements beyond iron, although neutron star mergers may be the main astrophysical source for many of these elements.

In the modern universe, old asymptotic giant branch (AGB) stars are the dominant source of dust from oxides, carbon and s-process elements. However, in the early universe, before AGB stars formed, supernovae may have been the main source of dust.

=== Role in stellar evolution ===
Remnants of many supernovae consist of a compact object and a rapidly expanding shock wave of material. This cloud of material sweeps up surrounding interstellar medium during a free expansion phase, which can last for up to two centuries. The wave then gradually undergoes a period of adiabatic expansion, and will slowly cool and mix with the surrounding interstellar medium over a period of about 10,000 years.

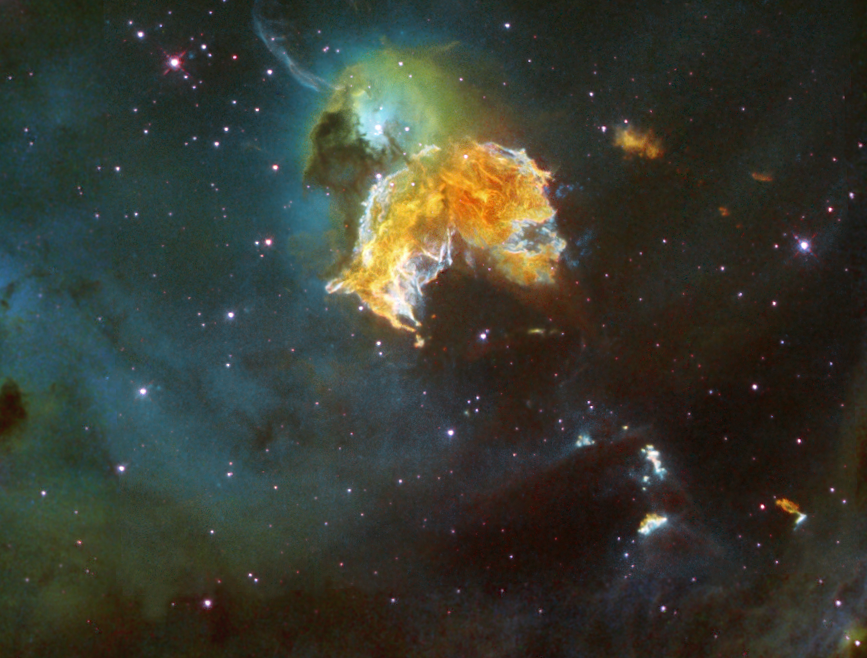
Supernova remnant N 63A lies within a clumpy region of gas and dust in the Large Magellanic Cloud.

The Big Bang produced hydrogen, helium and traces of lithium, while all heavier elements are synthesised in stars, supernovae, and collisions between neutron stars (thus being indirectly due to supernovae). Supernovae tend to enrich the surrounding interstellar medium with elements other than hydrogen and helium, which usually astronomers refer to as "metals". These ejected elements ultimately enrich the molecular clouds that are the sites of star formation. Thus, each stellar generation has a slightly different composition, going from an almost pure mixture of hydrogen and helium to a more metal-rich composition. Supernovae are the dominant mechanism for distributing these heavier elements, which are formed in a star during its period of nuclear fusion. The different abundances of elements in the material that forms a star have important influences on the star's life, and may influence the possibility of having planets orbiting it: more giant planets form around stars of higher metallicity.

The kinetic energy of an expanding supernova remnant can trigger star formation by compressing nearby, dense molecular clouds in space. The increase in turbulent pressure can also prevent star formation if the cloud is unable to lose the excess energy.

Evidence from daughter products of short-lived radioactive isotopes shows that a nearby supernova helped determine the composition of the Solar System 4.5 billion years ago, and may even have triggered the formation of this system.

Fast radio bursts (FRBs) are intense, transient pulses of radio waves that typically last no more than milliseconds. Many explanations for these events have been proposed; magnetars produced by core-collapse supernovae are leading candidates.

=== Cosmic rays ===
Supernova remnants are thought to accelerate a large fraction of galactic primary cosmic rays, but direct evidence for cosmic ray production has only been found in a small number of remnants. Gamma rays from pion-decay have been detected from the supernova remnants IC 443 and W44. These are produced when accelerated protons from the remnant impact on interstellar material.

=== Gravitational waves ===
Supernovae are thought to be sources of gravitational waves detectable in our Galaxy, but no supernovae have occurred in the Milky Way recently. The only gravitational wave events so far detected are from mergers of black holes and neutron stars, probable remnants of supernovae. Like the neutrino emissions, the gravitational waves produced by a core-collapse supernova are expected to arrive before the light generated by the subsequent explosion. Consequently, they may provide information about the core-collapse process that is unavailable by other means. Most gravitational-wave signals predicted by supernova models are short in duration, lasting less than a second, and thus difficult to detect. Using the arrival of a neutrino signal may provide a trigger that can identify the time window in which to seek the gravitational wave emission, helping to distinguish the latter from background noise.

=== Effect on Earth ===
A near-Earth supernova is a supernova close enough to the Earth to have noticeable effects on its biosphere. Depending upon the type and energy of the supernova, it could be as far as 3,000 light-years away. In 1996 it was theorised that traces of past supernovae might be detectable on Earth in the form of metal isotope signatures in rock strata. Iron-60 enrichment was later reported in deep-sea rock of the Pacific Ocean. In 2009, elevated levels of nitrate ions were found in Antarctic ice, which coincided with the 1006 and 1054 supernovae. Gamma rays from these supernovae could have boosted atmospheric levels of nitrogen oxides, which became trapped in the ice.

Historically, nearby supernovae may have influenced the biodiversity of life on the planet. Geological records suggest that nearby supernova events have led to an increase in cosmic rays, which in turn produced a cooler climate. A greater temperature difference between the poles and the equator created stronger winds, increased ocean mixing, and resulted in the transport of nutrients to shallow waters along the continental shelves. This led to greater biodiversity.

Type Ia supernovae are thought to be potentially the most dangerous if they occur close enough to the Earth. Because these supernovae arise from dim, common white dwarf stars in binary systems, it is likely that a supernova that can affect the Earth will occur unpredictably and in a star system that is not well studied. The closest-known candidate is IK Pegasi (HR 8210), about 150 light-years away, but observations suggest that it could be as long as 1.9 billion years before the white dwarf can accrete the critical mass required to become a Type Ia supernova.

According to a 2003 estimate, a Type II supernova would have to be closer than 8 parsecs (26 light-years) to destroy half of the Earth's ozone layer, and there are no such candidates closer than about 500 light-years.

== Milky Way candidates ==
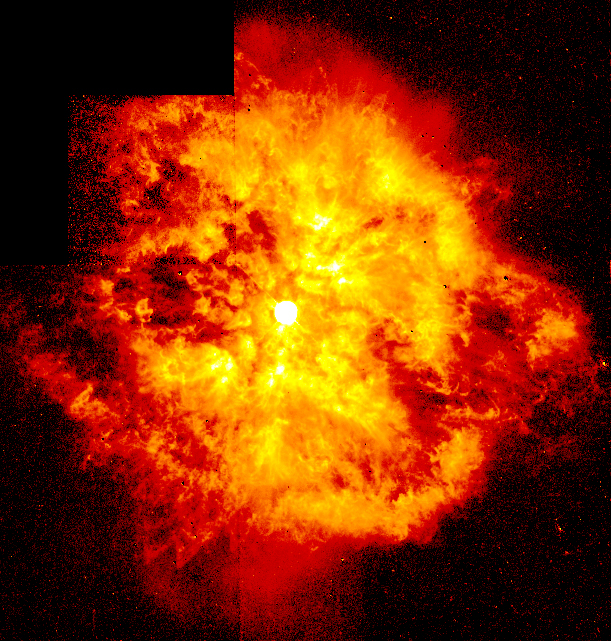
The nebula around Wolf–Rayet star WR124, which is located at a distance of about 21,000 light-years

The next supernova in the Milky Way will likely be detectable even if it occurs on the far side of the galaxy. It is likely to be produced by the collapse of an unremarkable red supergiant, and it is very probable that it will already have been catalogued in infrared surveys such as 2MASS. There is a smaller chance that the next core collapse supernova will be produced by a different type of massive star such as a yellow hypergiant, luminous blue variable, or Wolf–Rayet. The chances of the next supernova being a Type Ia produced by a white dwarf are calculated to be about a third of those for a core collapse supernova. Again it should be observable wherever it occurs, but it is less likely that the progenitor will ever have been observed. It is not even known exactly what a Type Ia progenitor system looks like, and it is difficult to detect them beyond a few parsecs. The total supernova rate in the Milky Way is estimated to be between 2 and 12 per century, although one has not actually been observed for several centuries.

Statistically, the most common variety of core-collapse supernova is Type II-P, and the progenitors of this type are red supergiants. It is difficult to identify which of those supergiants are in the final stages of heavy element fusion in their cores and which have millions of years left. The most-massive red supergiants shed their atmospheres and evolve to Wolf–Rayet stars before their cores collapse. All Wolf–Rayet stars end their lives from the Wolf–Rayet phase within a million years or so, but again it is difficult to identify those that are closest to core collapse. One class that is expected to have no more than a few thousand years before exploding are the WO Wolf–Rayet stars, which are known to have exhausted their core helium. Only eight of them are known, and only four of those are in the Milky Way.

A number of close or well-known stars have been identified as possible core collapse supernova candidates: the high-mass blue stars Spica, Rigel and Deneb, the red supergiants Betelgeuse, Antares, and VV Cephei A; the yellow hypergiant Rho Cassiopeiae; the luminous blue variable Eta Carinae that has already produced a supernova impostor; and both components, a blue supergiant and a Wolf–Rayet star, of the Regor or Gamma Velorum system. Mimosa, Acrux and Hadar or Beta Centauri, three bright star systems in the southern constellation of Crux and Centaurus respectively, each contain blue stars with sufficient masses to explode as supernovae. Others have gained notoriety as possible, although not very likely, progenitors for a gamma-ray burst; for example WR 104.

Identification of candidates for a Type Ia supernova is much more speculative. Any binary with an accreting white dwarf might produce a supernova, although the exact mechanism and timescale is still debated. These systems are faint and difficult to identify, but the novae and recurrent novae are such systems that conveniently advertise themselves via outburst. One example is U Scorpii.

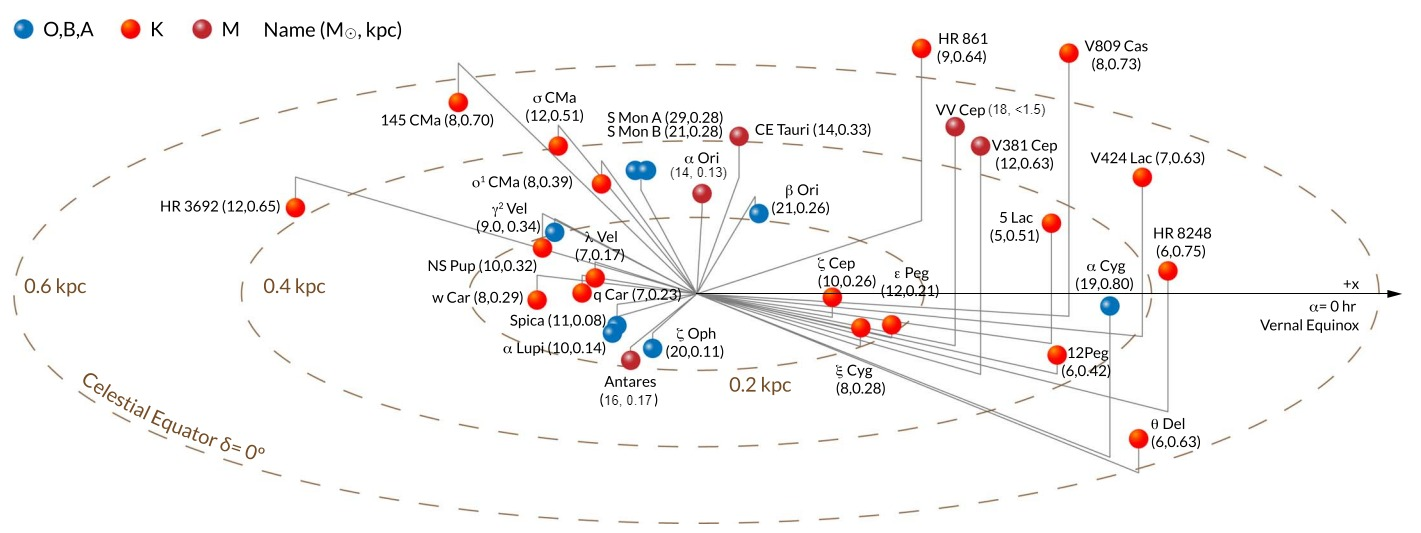
Some of the closest core-collapse supernova candidates to Earth within one kiloparsec, most of which are K-type red supergiants

== See also ==
- Collapsar – Star that has undergone gravitational collapse
- Kilonova – Aftermath of a neutron star merger
- List of supernova candidates
- List of supernova remnants
- List of supernovae
- Quark-nova – Hypothetical explosion of a neutron star
- Superluminous supernova – Supernova at least ten times more luminous than a standard supernova
- Supernovae in fiction
- Timeline of white dwarfs, neutron stars, and supernovae – Chronological list of developments in knowledge and records
