= Messier 61 =

Galaxy in the constellation Virgo

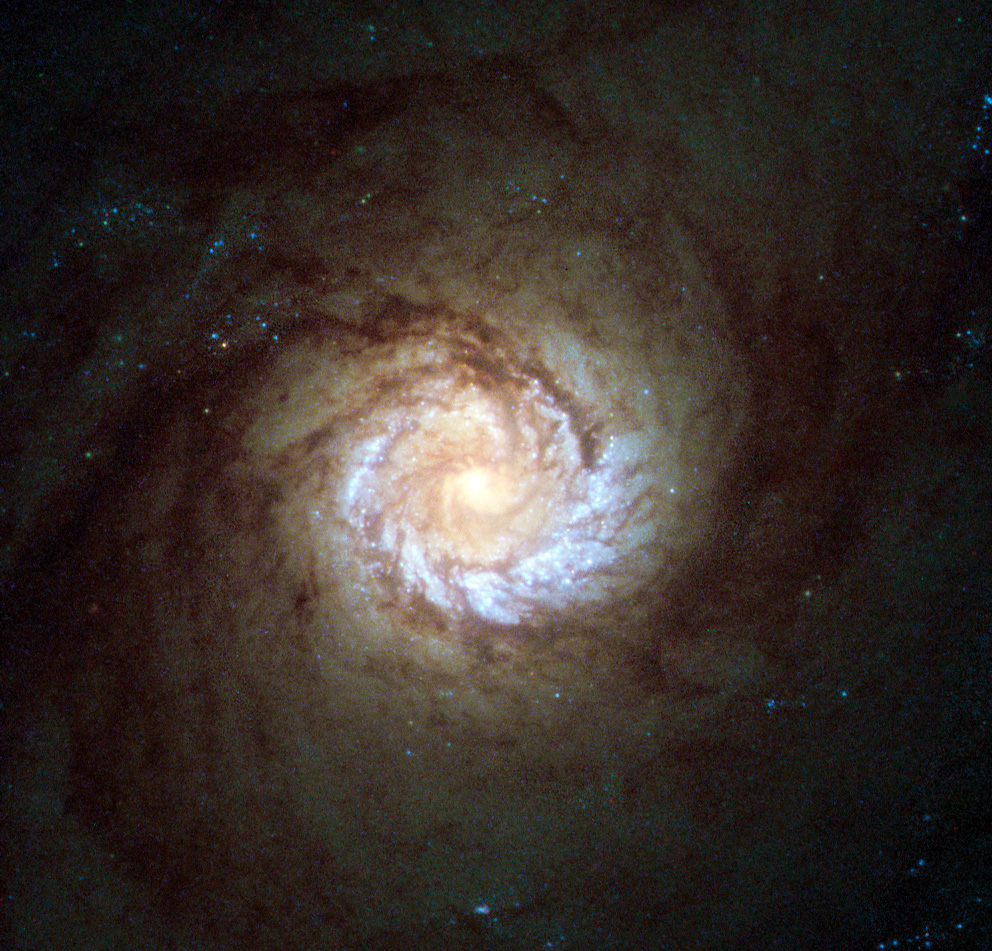
- M61 imaged by the Hubble Space Telescope on April 28, 2014

Observation data (J2000 epoch)
- Constellation: Virgo
- Right ascension: 12^{h} 21^{m} 54.9205^{s}
- Declination: +04° 28′ 25.631″
- Redshift: 0.005224±0.000007
- Heliocentric radial velocity: 1566±2 km/s
- Galactocentric velocity: 1483±4 km/s
- Distance: 52.5 ± 2.3 Mly (16.10 ± 0.71 Mpc)
- Apparent magnitude (V): 9.7

Characteristics
- Type: SAB(rs)bc, H_{II}Sy2
- Size: ~92,300 ly (28.30 kpc) (estimated)
- Apparent size (V): 6.5′ × 5.8′

Other designations
- HOLM 379A, IRAS 12194+0444, NGC 4303, UGC 7420, MCG +01-32-022, PGC 40001, CGCG 042-045
- References: SIMBAD: Search M61

Messier 61 (also known as M61, NGC 4303, or the Swelling Spiral Galaxy) is an intermediate barred spiral galaxy in the Virgo Cluster of galaxies. It was first discovered by Barnaba Oriani on May 5, 1779, six days before Charles Messier discovered the same galaxy. Messier had observed it on the same night as Oriani but had mistaken it for a comet. Its distance has been estimated to be 45.61 million light years from the Milky Way Galaxy. It is a member of the M61 Group of galaxies, which is a member of the Virgo II Groups, a series of galaxies and galaxy clusters strung out from the southern edge of the Virgo Supercluster.

== Properties ==
M61 is one of the largest members of Virgo Cluster, and belongs to a smaller subgroup known as the S Cloud. The morphological classification of SAB(rs)bc indicates a weakly-barred spiral (SAB) with the suggestion of a ring structure (rs) and moderate to loosely wound spiral arms. It has an active galactic nucleus and is classified as a starburst galaxy containing a massive nuclear star cluster with an estimated mass of 1 million solar masses (M_{☉}) and an age of 4 million years, as well as a central candidate supermassive black hole weighing around 5 million M_{☉}. It cohabits with an older massive star cluster as well as a likely older starburst. Evidence of significant star formation and active bright nebulae appears across M61's disk. Unlike most late-type spiral galaxies within the Virgo Cluster, M61 shows an unusual abundance of neutral hydrogen (H I). In 2026, a stellar stream was discovered north of Messier 61 using the Vera C. Rubin Observatory.

== Supernovae ==
Eight supernovae have been observed in M61, making it one of the most prodigious galaxies for such cataclysmic events. These include:

- SN 1926A (Type II, mag. 14) was discovered by Max Wolf and Karl Wilhelm Reinmuth on 9 May 1926.
- SN 1961I (Type II, mag. 13) was discovered by Milton Humason on 3 June 1961.
- SN 1964F (Type II, mag. 14) was discovered by Leonida Rosino on 30 June 1964.
- SN 1999gn (Type II, mag. 16) was discovered by Alessandro Dimai on 17 December 1999.
- SN 2006ov (Type II, mag. 14.9) was discovered by Kōichi Itagaki on 24 November 2006.
- SN 2008in (Type II, mag. 14.9) was discovered by Kōichi Itagaki on 26 December 2008.
- SN 2014dt (Type Ia-pec, mag. 13.6) was discovered by Kōichi Itagaki on 29 October 2014.
- SN 2020jfo (Type II, mag. 16.01) was discovered by the Zwicky Transient Facility on 6 May 2020.

== Gallery ==
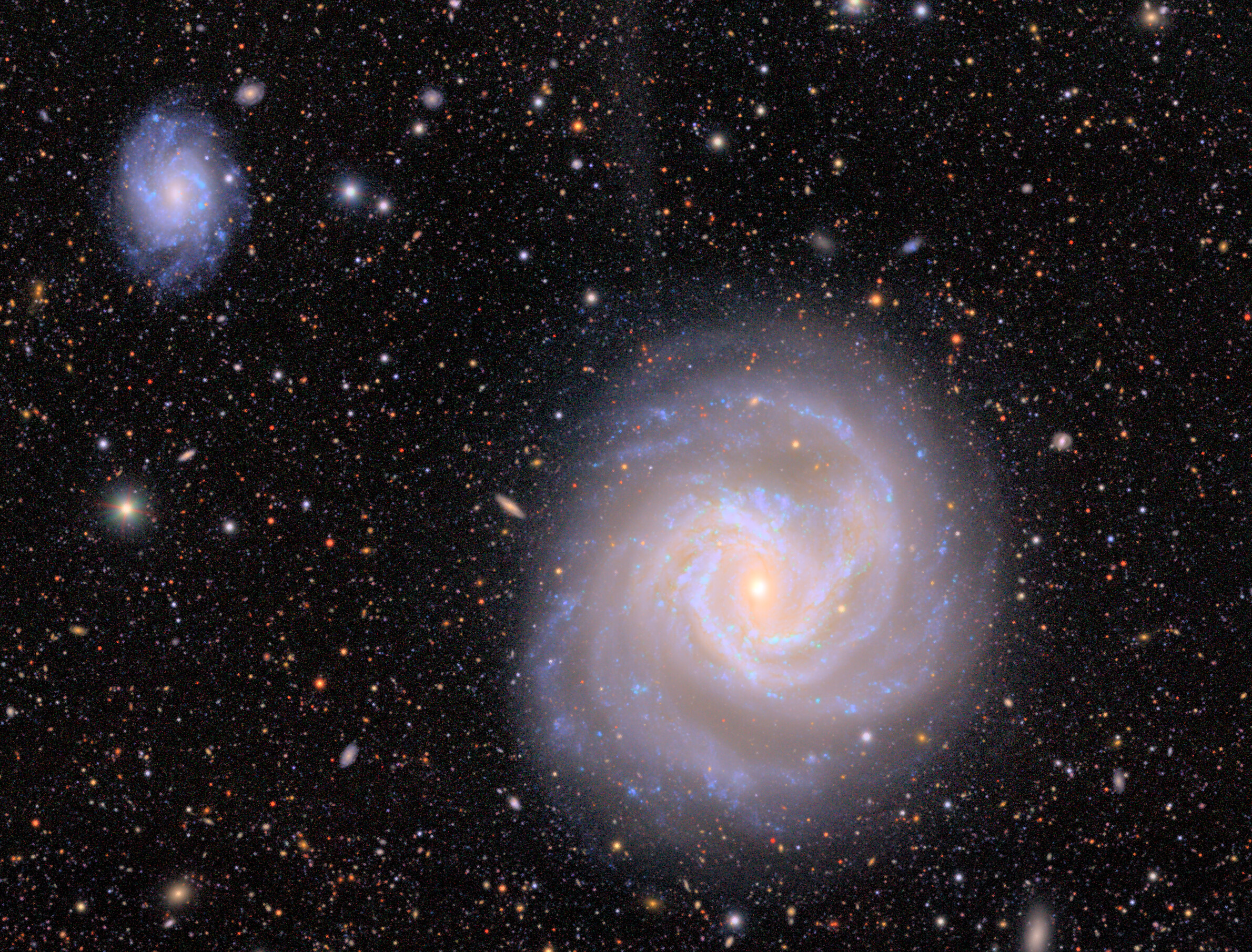
M61 (with NGC 4301 in upper left) imaged by the Vera C. Rubin Observatory

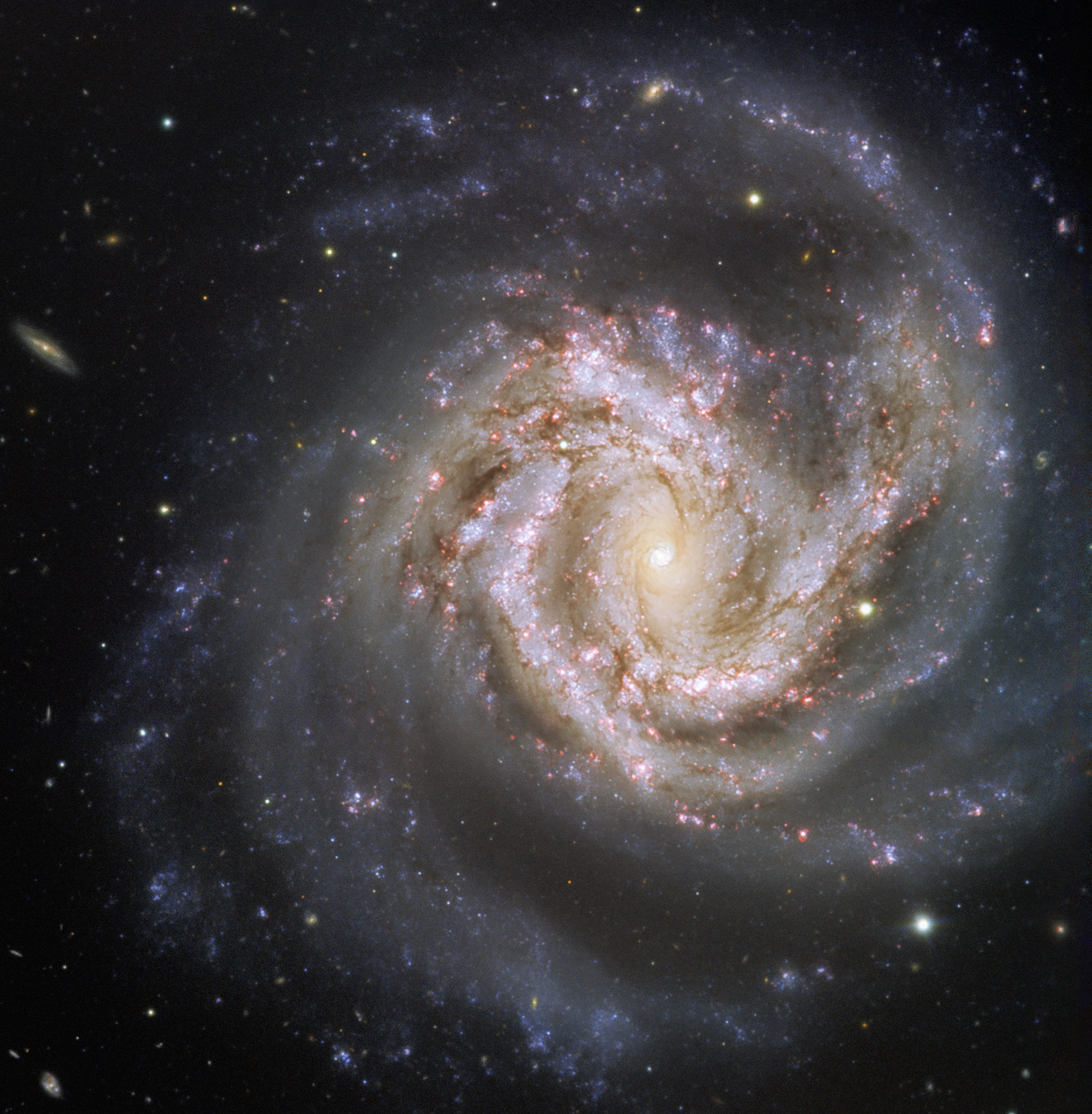
Spiral galaxy Messier 61 is aligned face-on towards Earth.

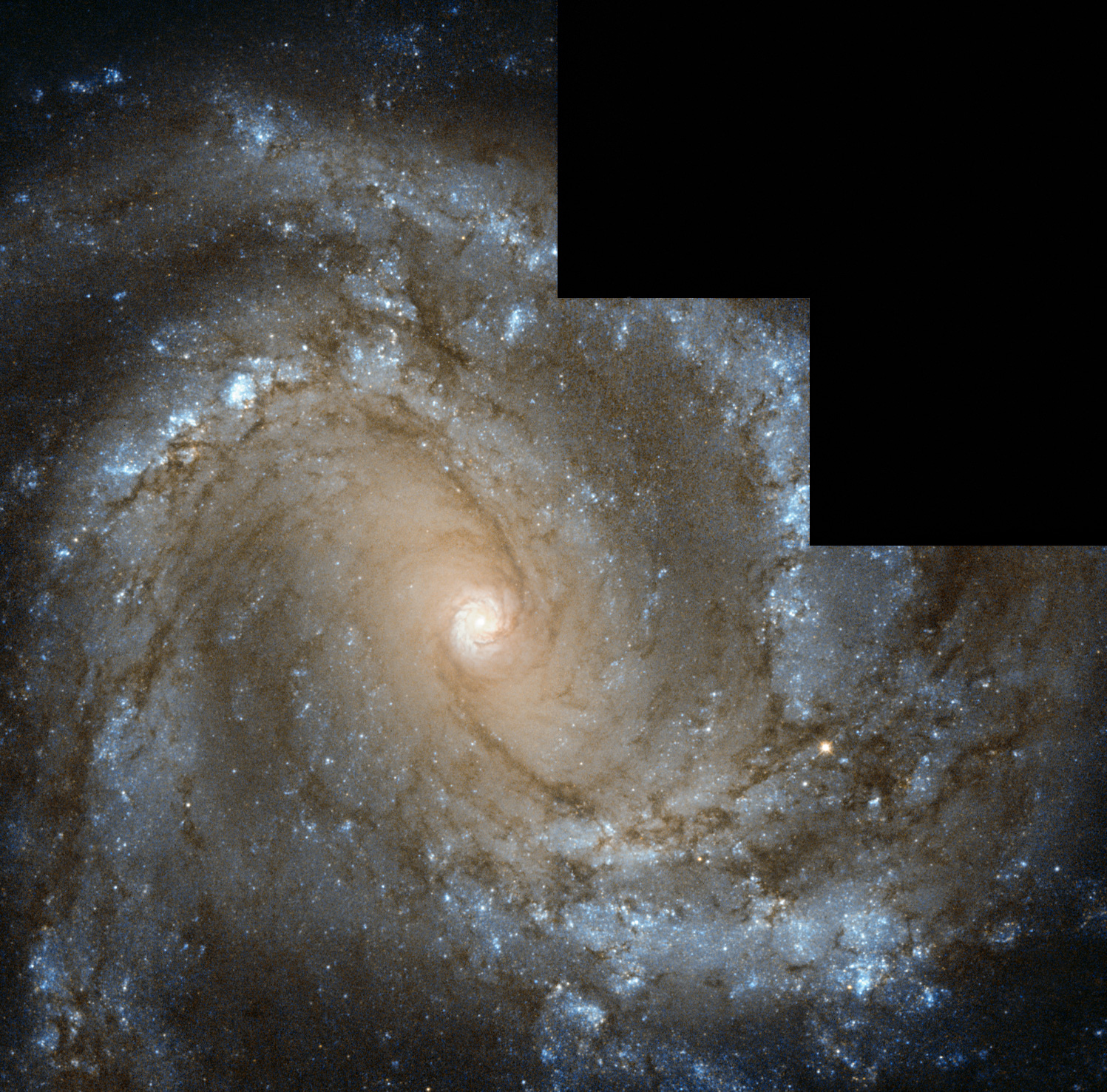
Messier 61 image using data from Hubble's Wide Field Camera 2

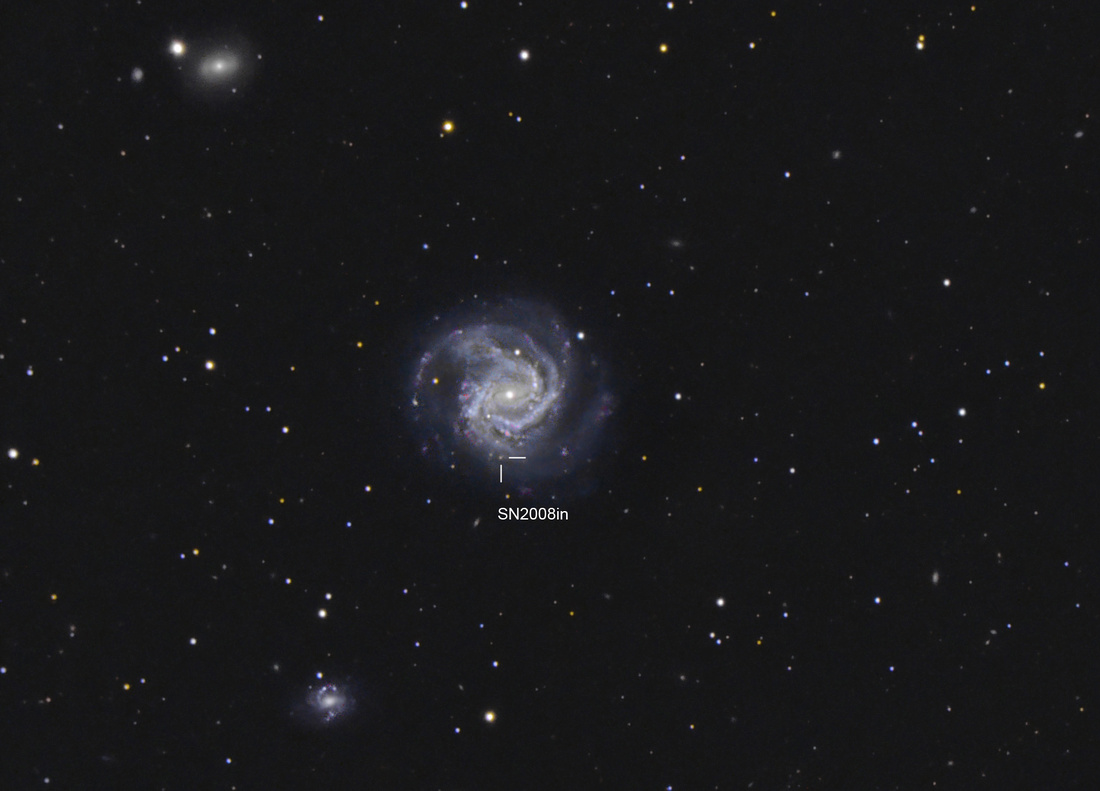
Amateur Image of Messier 61 Showing Supernova 2008in on April 16, 2009

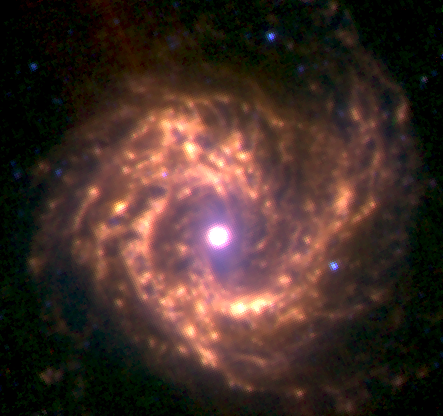
Infrared image of M61 taken by the Spitzer Space Telescope

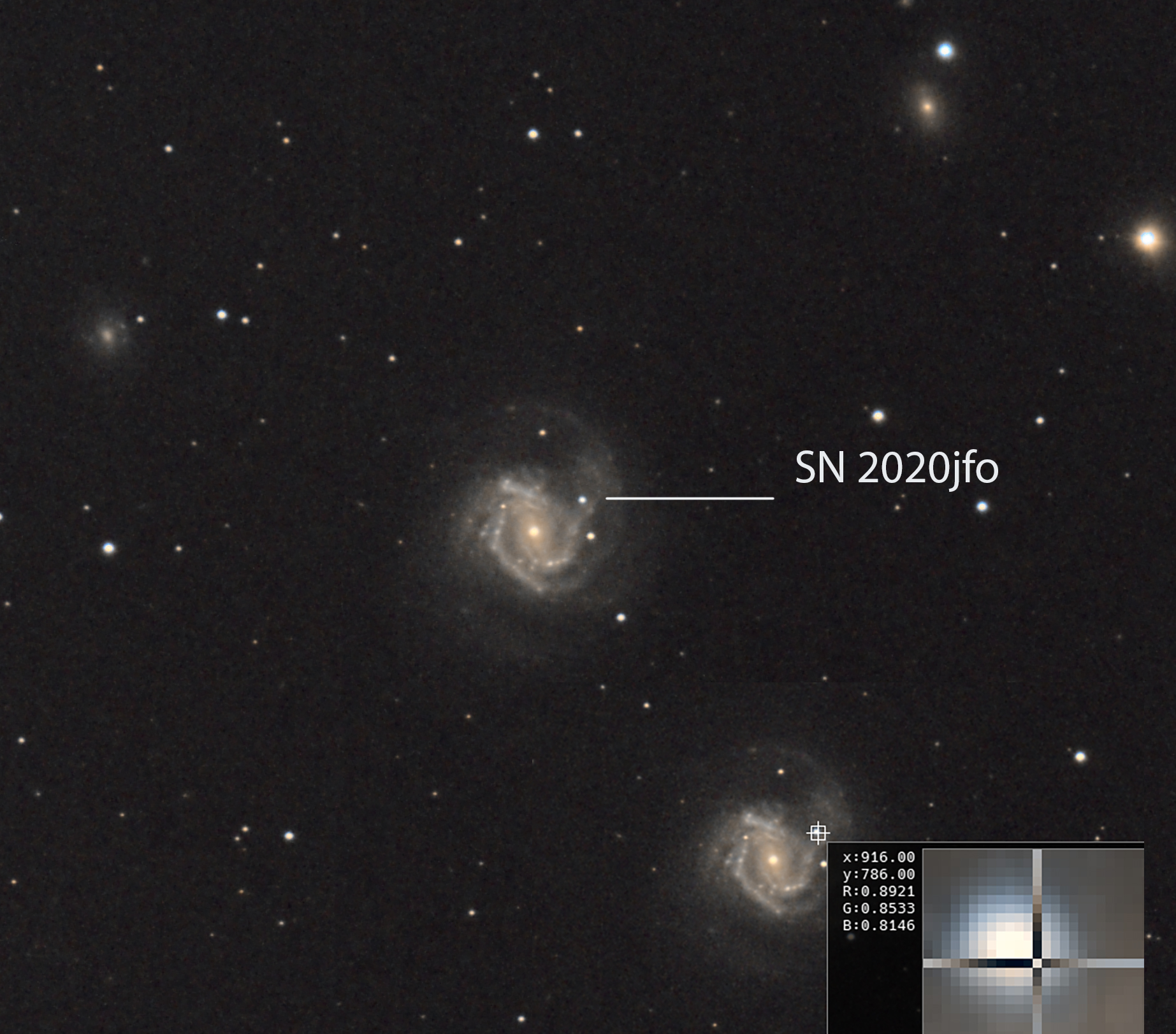
Messier 61 with SN2020jfo (Supernova) observed on May 15, 2020

M61 galaxy image that incorporates data from not only Hubble, but also the FORS camera at the European Southern Observatory’s Very Large Telescope

== See also ==
- List of Messier objects
