= List of supernovae =

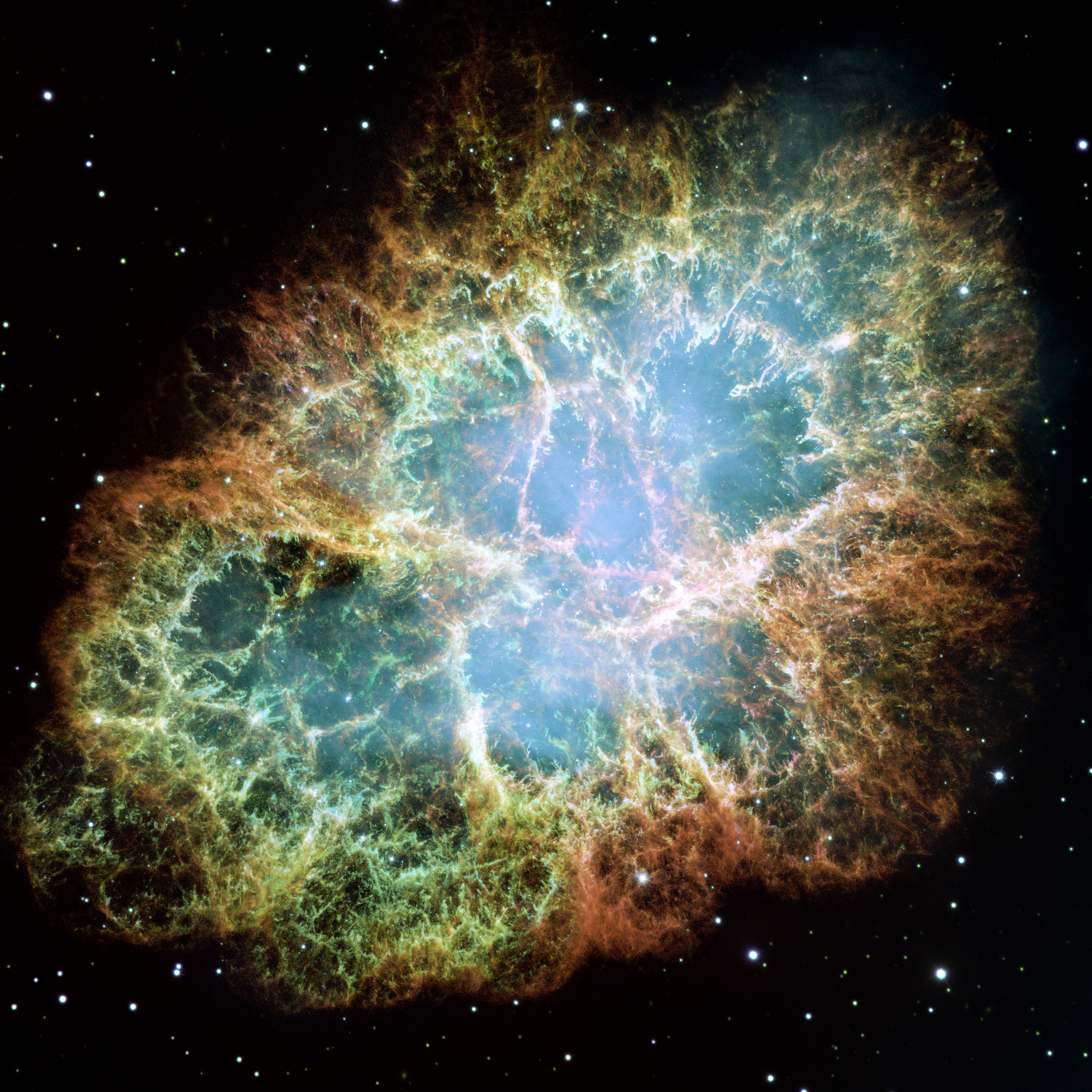
SN 1054 remnant (Crab Nebula)

A supernova is an event in which a star destroys itself in an explosion which can briefly become as luminous as an entire galaxy. This list of supernovae of historical significance includes events since 2000 that have been the subject of a scientific paper that contributed to supernova theory.

== List of supernovae since 2000 ==
This is a list of supernovae which occurred since 2000. For supernovae before 2000, see List of supernovae (before 2000).

In most entries, the year when the supernova was seen is part of the designation (1st column).

Supernova designation (year)	Constellation	Observations	Apparent magnitude	Distance (light years)	Type	Galaxy	Notes
SN 2002bj	Lupus	2002	+14.7	160,000,000	IIn	NGC 1821	AM Canum Venaticorum-type outburst.
SN 2002dd	Ursa Major	2002	+24.0	8,000,000,000	Ia	anonymous galaxy	Furthest supernova observed through Hubble Deep Field.
SN 2003fg	Boötes	2003		4,000,000,000	Ia	anonymous galaxy	Also known as the "Champagne supernova"
SN 2004am	Ursa Major	March 2004		11,500,000	II	M82 (Cigar Galaxy)	
SN 2004dj	Camelopardalis	31 July 2004; 18:15		8,000,000	II-P	NGC 2403	NGC 2403 is an outlying member of the M81 Group
SN 2213-1745	Aquarius	November 2004-June 2005			II		
SN 2005ap	Coma Berenices	3 March 2005		4,700,000,000	II	?	Announced in 2007 to be the brightest supernova up to that point.
SN 2005gj	Cetus	27 September 2005		865,000,000	Ia/II-n	?	Notable for having characteristics of both Type Ia and Type IIn.
SN 2005gl	Pisces	5 October 2005	+16.5	200,000,000	II-n	NGC 266	Star could be found on old pictures.
SN 2006gy	Perseus	18 September 2006	+15	240,000,000	IIn ^{(*)}	NGC 1260	Observed by NASA,^{*}with a peak of over 70 days, possibly a new type.
SN 2006jc	Lynx	9 October 2006		77,000,000	Ibn	UGC 4904	
SN 2007bi	Virgo	Early 2007	+18.3		Ia	anonymous dwarf galaxy	Extremely bright and long-lasting, the first good observational match for the pair-instability supernova model postulated for stars of initial mass greater than 140 solar masses (even better than SN 2006gy). The precursor is estimated at 200 solar masses, similar to the first stars of the early universe.
SN 2007uy	Lynx	31 December 2007	+16.8	84,000,000	Ibc	NGC 2770	Got overshadowed by SN 2008D.
SN 2008D	Lynx	9 January 2008		88,000,000	Ibc	NGC 2770	First supernova to be observed while it exploded.
MENeaC Abell399.3.14.0	Aries		+28.7	1,000,000,000 (z=0.0613)	Ia	anonymous red globular cluster associated with anonymous red elliptical galaxy in cluster Abell 399	Observed in 2009. Supernova associated with a globular cluster
SN 2009ip	Piscis Austrinus	2009		66,000,000	IIn	NGC 7259	In 2009 classified as supernova. Redesignated as Luminous blue variable (LBV) Supernova impostor. In September 2012 classified as a young type IIn supernova.
SN 2010lt	Camelopardalis	2 January 2011	+17.0	240,000,000	Ia (sub-luminous)	UGC 3378	Discovered by 10-year-old girl, the youngest person to discover a supernova.
SN 2011fe	Ursa Major	24 August 2011	+10.0	21,000,000	Ia	M101	One of the very few extragalactic supernovae visible in 50mm binoculars.
SN UDS10Wil	Cetus	April 2013		16,600,000,000			Also Known as SN Wilson.
SN 2014J	Ursa Major	Mid January 2014	+10.1	11,500,000	Ia	M82	Closest supernova since SN 2004dj in NGC 2403.
SN 2014aa	Leo	7 March 2014		310,000,000	Ia	NGC 3861	
SN Refsdal	Leo	11 November 2014		14,400,000,000		SP 1149	It is the first detected multiply-lensed supernova, visible within the field of the galaxy cluster MACS J1149+2223.
ASASSN-15ga	Virgo	1 April 2015		1,000,000,000	Ia	NGC 4866	
ASASSN-15lh SN 2015L	Indus	14 June 2015	+16.9	3,800,000,000	Ic	APMUKS(BJ) B215839.70−615403.9	Most luminous hypernova ever observed.
IPTF14hls	Ursa Major	September 2014	+17.7	509,000,000	unknown	SDSS J092034.44+504148.7 (possible dwarf galaxy)	Unusual supernova
SN 2016aps	Draco	22 February 2016	+18.11	3,600,000,000	SLSB-II	?	Most luminous supernova-like event to date.
SN 2017gax	Dorado	14 August 2017		517,000,000	I	NGC 1672	
SN 2018gv	Puppis	15 January 2018		70,000,000	Ia	NGC 2525	
SN 2018zd	Camelopardalis	2 March 2018	+17.8	70,000,000	Ia-csm	NGC 2146	First electron capture supernova ever detected
SN 2018cow	Hercules	16 June 2018, 10:35:02		200,000,000	Ib	CGCG 137-068	
SN 2019np	Leo Minor	9 January 2019	+13.0	75,000,000	Ia	NGC 3254	
SN 2019hgp	Boötes		+20.16	920,000,000	Icn		First detected supernova of a Wolf-Rayet star
SN 2020oi	Coma Berenices	7 January 2020	+17.28	46,000,000	Ic	Messier 100	
SN 2020fqv	Virgo	31 March 2020	+19.0	59,400,000	IIb	NGC 4568	Earliest known observation of an explosion, 26 hours after
SN 2020jfo	Virgo	6 May 2020		45,610,000	II	M61	
SN 2020tlf	Boötes	2020	+15.89	120,000,000	IIn	NGC 5731	First red supergiant observed before, during and after explosion; earliest known observation, at 130 days before explosion
SN 2021gmj	Ursa Major	20 March 2021	+11.2	34,800,000	II-P	NGC 3310	
SN 2021hpr	Draco	April 2, 2021		129,000,000 ± 29	Ia	NGC 3147	
SN 2021jad	Lepus	April 2021		65,000,000	Ia	NGC 1964	
SN 2021yja	Eridanus	8 September 2021		750,000,000	II	NGC 1325	
SN 2021aefx	Dorado	11 November 2021	+17.2	69,000,000	Ia	NGC 1566	
SN 2021afdx	Sculptor	23 November 2021	+18.8	500,000,000	II	Cartwheel Galaxy	
SN 2022jli	Cetus	5 May 2022	+14	75,000,000	type I-c	NGC 157	Type Ic, shows periodicity
SN 2022aajn	Gemini	November 2022		600,000,000	Ia		
SN 2023ixf	Ursa Major	19 May 2023; 17:27	+10.8	21,000,000	type II-L	Pinwheel Galaxy (M101)	Closest and brightest supernova since SN 2014J
SN 2023rve	Fornax	8 September 2023	+13.9	450,000,000	II	NGC 1097	Brightest Supernova Since SN 2023ixf.
SN 2023vyl	Pegasus	28 October 2023		783,000,000	Ia	NGC 7625	
SN 2023abdg	Grus	12 December 2023		816,000,000	II	NGC 7421	
SN 2023ufx			+15.55		II		The most metal-poor supernova found to date.
SN H0pe	Ursa Major	2023	+23.93	16,100,000,000 (z=1.783)	Ia	PLCK G165.7+67.0 Arc 1	
SN 2024gy	Virgo	4 January 2024	+12.8	55,000,000	Ia	NGC 4216	
SN 2024ggi	Hydra	11 April 2024	+11.9	21,700,000	II	NGC 3621	
SN 2024inv	Leo	10 May 2024	+12.1	82,200,000	Ia	NGC 3524	
SN 2024muv	Virgo	26 June 2024	+12.7	65,000,000	Ia	NGC 4699	
SN 2024abfl	Camelopardalis	15 November 2024		41,000,000	II	NGC 2146	
SN 2025gj	Hydra	8 January 2025 (DLT40)	+13.7	116,310,000	Ia	NGC 2986	
SN 2025pht	Eridanus	29 June 2025 (ASAS-SN)	+13.3	31,900,000	II-P	NGC 1637	
SN 2025rbs	Pegasus	14 July 2025 (GOTO)	+11.9	43,790,000	Ia	NGC 7331	Brightest Supernova of 2025
SN Eos	Sagittarius	1 September 2025 (JWST)	—N/a	26,138,000,000	II-P	—N/a	Most distant spectroscopically confirmed supernova from Earth
SN 2026kid	Draco	22 April 2026	+16.22	46,500,000	II	NGC 5907	

== Supernova statistics ==
Yearly extragalactic supernovae reported
Year	Total	Type I	Type II	LBV (imposters)	Brighter than apmag 13	Apmag of brightest Supernova of that year
2025	26649	1594	501	5	1	11.9 (2025rbs in NGC 7331)
2024	23876	1682	479	4	7	11.7 (2024ggi in NGC 3621)
2023	21080	1484	472	7	2	10.9 (2023ixf in Messier 101)
2022	21610	1793	432	8	4	12.1 (2022pul in NGC 4415)
2021	23725	1922	513	5	8	12.0 (2021aefx in NGC 1566)
2020	21843	1663	472	7	5	11.8 (2020ue in NGC 4636)
2019	18909	1663	510	9	1	13.0 (2019np in NGC 3254)
2018	12777	1235	344	7	5	12.7 (2018pv in NGC 3941)
2017	8305	747	218	4	3	11.5 (2017cbv in NGC 5643)
2016	7748	681	226	3	0	13.0 (2016coj in NGC 4125)
2015	4486	707	215	4	2	12.9 (2015F in NGC 2442)
2014	2247	528	175	3	3	10.1 (2014J in Messier 82)
2013	2142	498	190	8	6	11.3 (2013aa in NGC 5643)
2012	1224	550	152	8	5	11.9 (2012fr in NGC 1365)
2011	1155	439	160	10	7	9.9 (2011fe in Messier 101)
2010	933	279	135	7	2	12.8 (2010ih in NGC 2325)
2009	578	202	138	1	0	13.0 (2009ig in NGC 1015)
2008	582	291	157	1	3	12.4 (2008ge in NGC 1527)
2007	664	482	147	1	3	12.0 (2007it in NGC 5530)
2006	559	418	124	2	3	12.1 (2006dd in NGC 1316)
2005	423	298	104	1	2	12.3 (2005df in NGC 1559)
2004	353	221	79	0	2	11.2 (2004dj in NGC 2403)
2003	384	198	89	1	1	12.3 (2003hv in NGC 1201)
2002	353	163	64	0	1	12.3 (2002ap in Messier 74)
2001	310	108	75	0	2	12.3 (2001el in NGC 1448)
2000	199	76	49	1	0	13.1 (2000cx in NGC 524)
2000–2025	203,114	19,922 (76.2%)	6220	107	78	

== See also ==
- Lists of astronomical objects
- List of supernovae (before 2000)
- List of most distant supernovae
- List of supernova candidates
- List of supernova remnants
- Supernovae
- Superluminous supernova
- Hypernovae
