= SN 2014J =

Supernova in Messier 82

- First image: Messier 82 on 10 December 2013. Second image: The same view on 22 January 2014. The position of the supernova is marked.
- Event type: Supernova
- SN.Ia
- Right ascension: 9^{h} 55^{m} 42.217^{s}
- Declination: 69° 40′ 26.56″
- Epoch: J2000
- Distance: 11,500,000 ly (3,500,000 pc)
- Host: Messier 82
- Progenitor: unknown
- Notable features: Closest Type Ia for 40 years
- Peak apparent magnitude: 10.1
- Other designations: SN 2014J
- Related media on Commons

SN 2014J was a Type-Ia supernova in Messier 82 (the 'Cigar Galaxy', M82) discovered in mid-January 2014. It was the closest Type-Ia supernova discovered for 42 years, and no subsequent supernova has been closer as of 2023. The supernova was discovered by chance during an undergraduate teaching session at the University of London Observatory. It peaked on 31 January 2014, reaching an apparent magnitude of 10.5. SN 2014J was the subject of an intense observing campaign by professional astronomers and was bright enough to be seen by amateur astronomers.

== Discovery ==
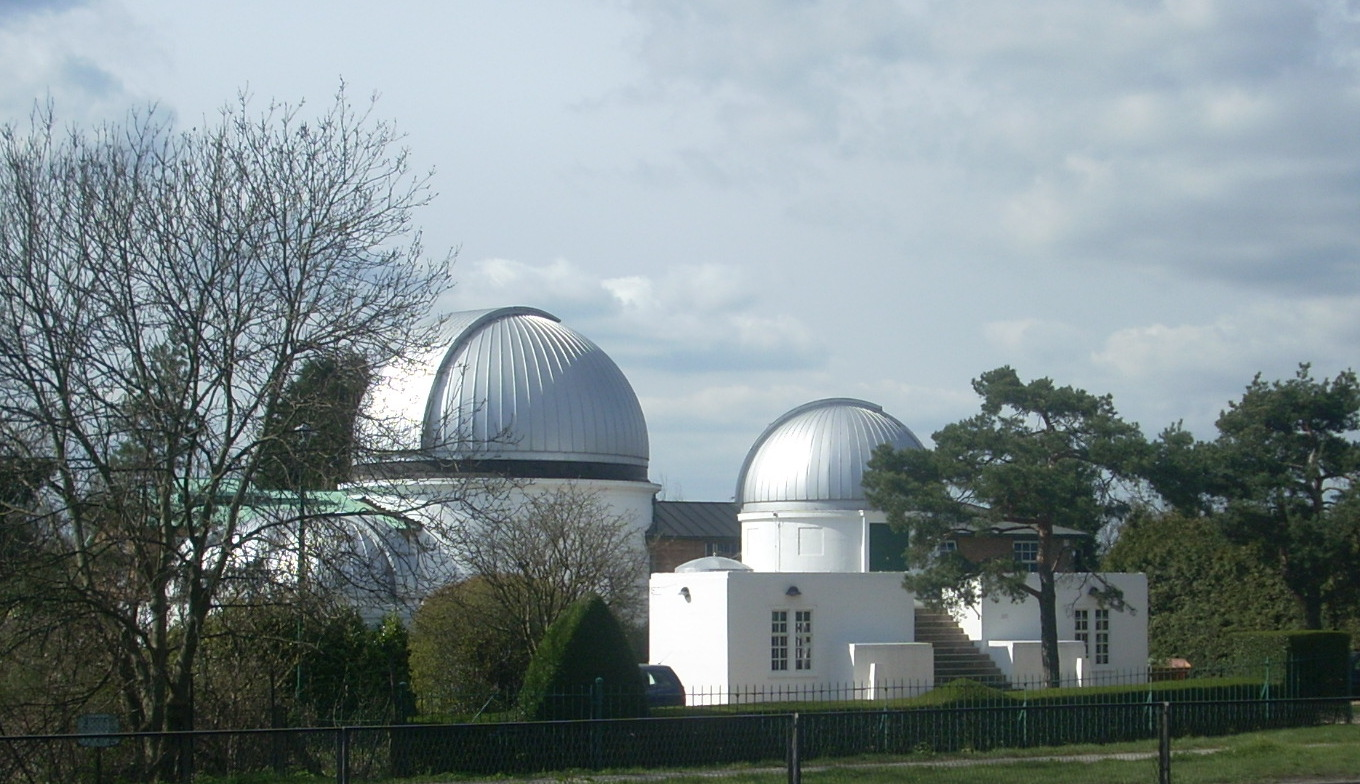
University of London Observatory, where SN 2014J was discovered.

The supernova was discovered by astronomer Steve Fossey, of University College London and four of his undergraduate students: Ben Cooke, Guy Pollack, Matthew Wilde and Thomas Wright. Fossey was training the students on how to use a small 0.35-metre (14 in) telescope at University of London Observatory, located in Mill Hill, a suburb of north London.

The discovery was serendipitous, because Fossey was not searching for supernovae, had not planned to look at M82, and only wanted to take advantage of a short gap in the London cloud cover. He later said that "The weather was closing in, with increasing cloud, so instead of the planned practical astronomy class, I gave the students an introductory demonstration of how to use the CCD camera on one of the observatory’s automated 0.35–metre telescopes."

At 19:20 GMT on 21 January 2014, Fossey and his students noticed a bright new star in their images of the galaxy Messier 82, also known as the Cigar Galaxy. After comparing their image to archival ones of the same galaxy, they used observations with a second telescope to eliminate the possibility of an instrumental artefact. Their discovery was reported to the International Astronomical Union's Central Bureau for Astronomical Telegrams, who confirmed that they were the first to spot the supernova and assigned it the name SN 2014J as the tenth supernova discovered in 2014. Fossey and the four students were credited as joint discoverers.

== Observations ==
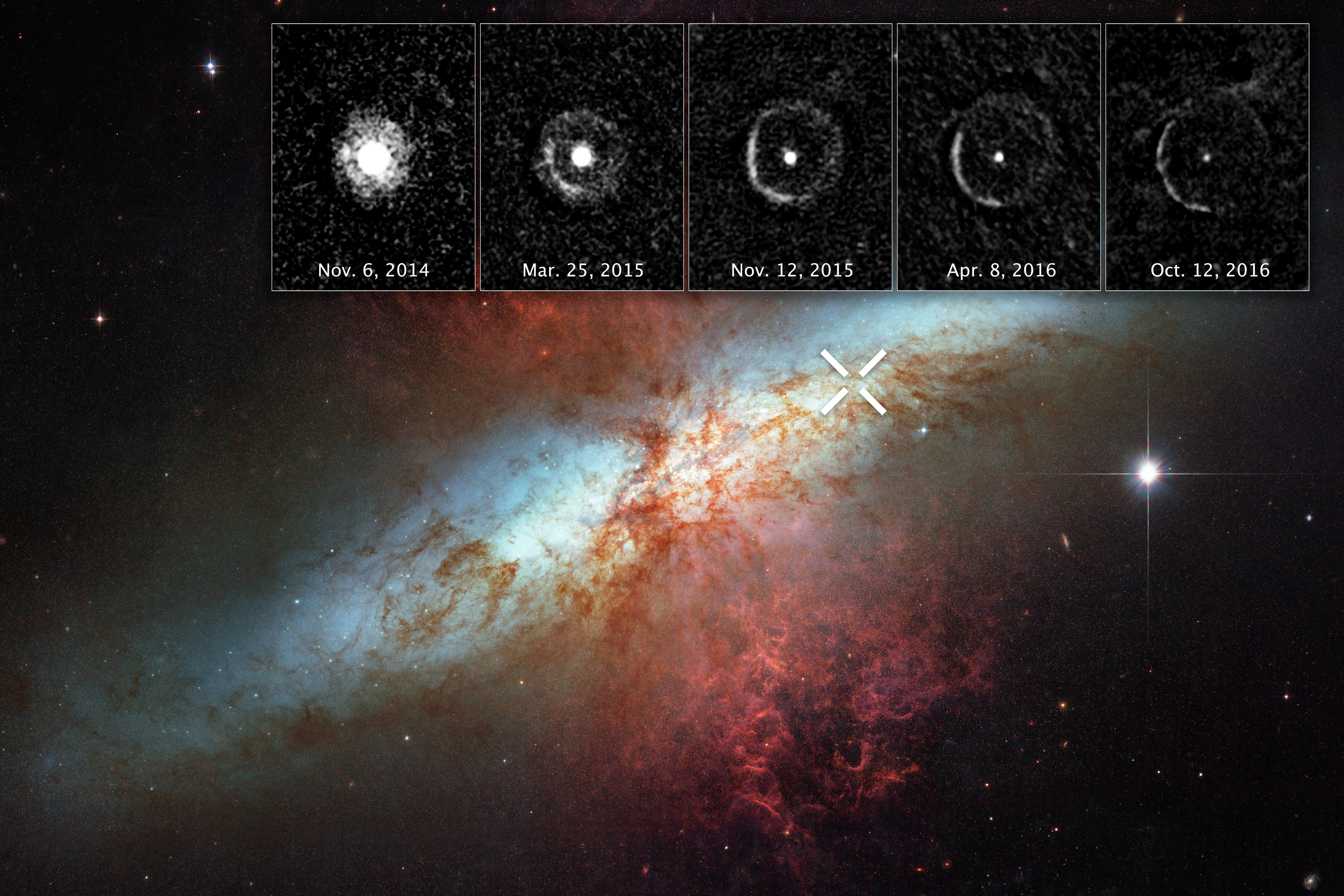
Light echo around SN 2014J in M82.

Follow-up adaptive optics observations with the 10-metre (390 in) Keck telescope at Mauna Kea Observatory, Hawaii were used to precisely determine the location of the new supernova. The first optical spectrum was obtained using the 3.5-metre (140 in) ARC telescope in New Mexico, which showed the supernova to be of Type Ia. Pre-discovery recovery images were found that showed the supernova as early as 15 January, six days before discovery.

Early indications were that the supernova had been discovered approximately 14 days before maximum light, so it would get brighter over the following fortnight. It was predicted to be bright enough to be visible with binoculars throughout the Northern Hemisphere. The supernova continued to get brighter until 31 January, when it peaked at an apparent magnitude of 10.5.

SN 2014J was a popular target for amateur astronomers because it was located close to The Plough asterism (the 'Big Dipper') and visible all night for most Northern Hemisphere observers.

Its unusual brightness and relative closeness led to SN 2014J becoming the subject of intense follow-up observations by astronomers worldwide, including with the Hubble Space Telescope. Over 435 scientific papers have discussed the supernova.

== Physical properties ==
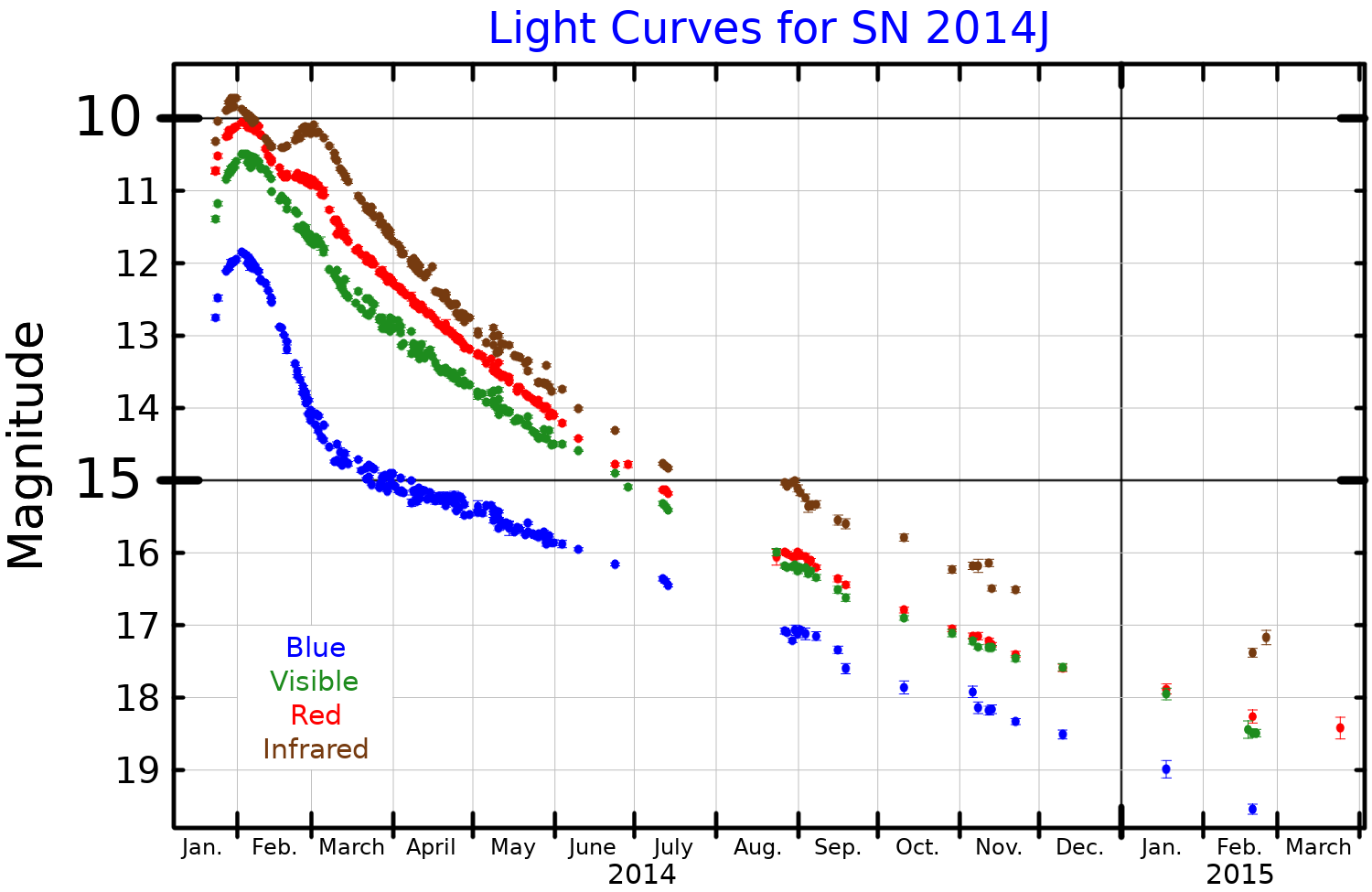
Light curves for SN 2014J in four photometric bands, plotted from data published by Tsvetkov et al. (2018)

Type Ia supernovae are especially important as standard candles in physical cosmology, and the relative closeness of SN2014J allowed astronomers to study the explosion in much more detail than is possible for most objects of this type.

SN2014J was observed by the INTErnational Gamma-Ray Astrophysics Laboratory (INTEGRAL) which detected the gamma-ray spectral lines characteristic of the radioactive decay chain ^{56}Ni→^{56}Co→^{56}Fe. This was the first time these lines were detected in a Type Ia supernova, providing support for the standard model that this class of supernova produces large quantities of ^{56}Ni through nucleosynthesis.

Observations of the diffuse interstellar bands in the spectrum of the supernova indicated that it lay behind a significant quantity of interstellar medium in M82. The supernova therefore suffered from interstellar extinction, with a reddening of at least one magnitude. The degree of light extinction from M82 dust blocking SN 2014J reduces its value as an observational prototype for Type Ia supernovae, but makes it a powerful probe of the interstellar medium of M82.

Researchers used archival images from the Hubble Space Telescope to study the environment of SN 2014J prior to the supernova, hoping to identify the progenitor system, but found no identifiable progenitor star. This is not unexpected, because the progenitors of Type Ia supernovae are thought to be white dwarfs in binary systems, and observation of SN 2014J provided empirical confirmation for this. The white dwarf is much too faint to detect at the distance of M82, but its companion would have been detectable if it had been a bright evolved giant star. It will however remain too faint if it is a second white dwarf (the double degenerate Type Ia supernova path), a lower main-sequence star, or even a giant star on the fainter part of the giant sequence.

== Distance ==
At a distance of 11.5 ± 0.8 million light-years (3.5 ± 0.3 megaparsecs), SN 2014J was one of the closest supernovae seen for decades. It was the closest Type Ia supernova since SN 1972E, and the closest supernova of any type since 2004. Some sources initially stated that SN 2014J was the closest supernova of any type since SN 1987A, but this claim is erroneous. The last supernova that was unambiguously closer to Earth than SN 2014J was SN 2004dj, a Type II-P supernova in the galaxy NGC 2403, 8 million light-years from Earth. SN 1993J was a Type IIb supernova at almost the same distance as SN 2014J, because it was located in Messier 81, which together with Messier 82 and NGC 3077 forms the core of the M81 group of galaxies.

== See also ==
- History of supernova observation
- List of supernovae
