= List of supernovae (before 2000) =

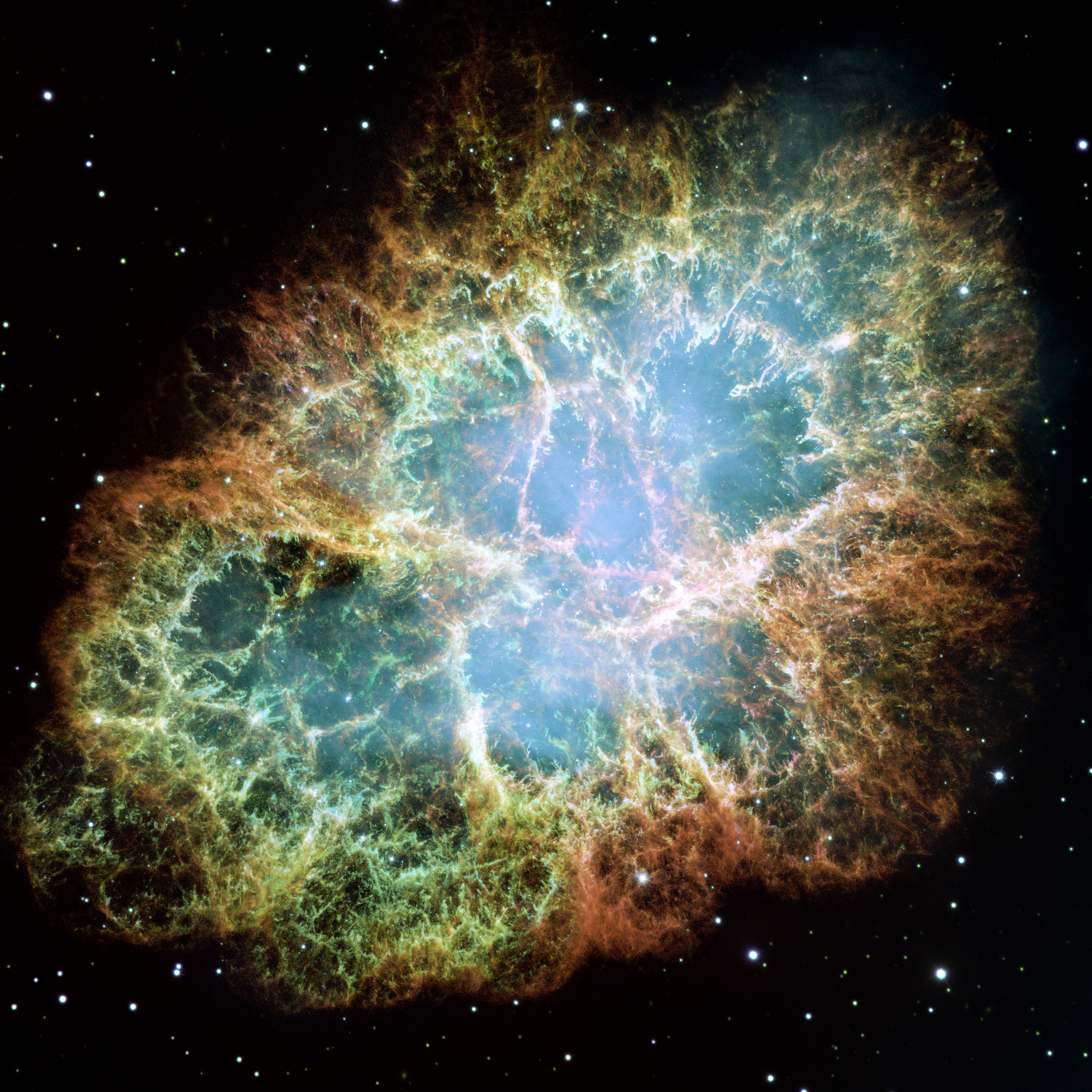
SN 1054 remnant (Crab Nebula)

A supernova is an event in which a star destroys itself in an explosion which can briefly become as luminous as an entire galaxy. This list of supernovas of historical significance includes events that were observed prior to the development of photography, and individual events before 2000 that have been the subject of a scientific paper that contributed to supernova theory.

== List of supernovae before 2000 ==
For supernovae since 2000 see List of supernovae.

In most entries, the year when the supernova was seen is part of the designation (1st column).

Supernova designation (year)	Constellation	Observations	Apparent magnitude	Distance (light years)	Type	Galaxy	Notes
SN 185	Centaurus	7 December 185	−4 (?)	9,100	Ia (?)	Milky Way	Surviving description sketchy; modern estimates of maximum apparent magnitude vary from +4 to −8. The remnant is probably RCW 86, some 8200 ly distant, making it comparable to SN 1572. Some researchers have suggested it was a comet, not a supernova.
SN 386	Sagittarius	April/May 386	+1.5	14,700	II	Milky Way	"suggested SN", candidate remnant could be G11.2-0.3. There are three suggestions and doubtful if SN at all or classical nova or something else.
SN 393	Scorpius	27 February − 28 March - 22 October − 19 November 393	–0	3,400	II/Ib	Milky Way	"possible SN", could also be classical nova or something else
SN 1006	Lupus	17 April 1006 - 1 May 1006	–7.5	7,200	Ia	Milky Way	Widely observed on Earth; in apparent magnitude, the brightest stellar event in recorded history.
SN 1054	Taurus	c. 10 July [O.S. c. 4 July] 1054 c. 12 April [O.S. c. 6 April] 1056	–6	6,500	II	Milky Way	Remnant is the Crab Nebula with its pulsar (neutron star)
SN 1181	Cassiopeia	4 August 1181 - 6 August 1181	0	7,100	sub-luminous Type Iax supernova	Milky Way	Remnant is Pa 31 with its hot stellar remnant
SN 1572	Cassiopeia	November 1572	–4.0	8,000	Ia	Milky Way	Tycho's Nova
SN 1604	Ophiuchus	8–9 October 1604	–3	14,000	Ia	Milky Way	Kepler's Supernova; most recent readily visible supernova within the Milky Way
Cas A	Cassiopeia	1680	+5	9,000	IIb	Milky Way	Apparently never visually conspicuous, due to interstellar dust; but the remnant, Cas A, is the brightest extrasolar radio source in the sky
G1.9+0.3	Sagittarius	1868	(visible light masked by dust)	25,000	Ia	Milky Way	Located near the Galactic Center; "Posthumously" discovered in 1985; age determined in 2008
SN 1885A	Andromeda	20 August 1885	+5.85	2,500,000	Ipec	Andromeda Galaxy	First observation of an extragalactic supernova
SN 1895B	Centaurus	12 December 1895	+8.0	10,900,000	Ia	NGC 5253	
SN 1909A	Ursa Major	January 1909	+12.1	21,000,000		Pinwheel Galaxy (M101)	
SN 1937C	Canes Venatici	24 August 1937	+8.4	13,000,000	Ia	IC 4182	
SN 1939C	Cepheus	17 July 1939	+13.0	25,200,000	I	NGC 6946 (Fireworks Galaxy)	
SN 1940B	Coma Berenices	5 May 1940	+12.8	38,000,000	II-P	NGC 4725	
SN 1951H	Ursa Major	1 September 1951	+17.5	21,000,000		Pinwheel Galaxy (M101)	
SN 1961V	Perseus	11 July 1961	+12.5	30,000,000	II?	NGC 1058	Potential supernova impostor
SN 1970G	Ursa Major	30 July 1970	+12.1	21,000,000	II	Pinwheel Galaxy (M101)	
SN 1972E	Centaurus	13 May 1972	+8.7	10,900,000	Ia	NGC 5253	Followed for more than a year; became the prototypical Type Ia supernova
SN 1983N	Hydra	3 July 1983	+11.8	15,000,000	Ib	Messier 83	First observation of a Type Ib supernova
SN 1986J	Andromeda	21 August 1986	+18.4	30,000,000	IIn	NGC 891	Bright in the radio frequency range
SN 1987A	Dorado	1987	+2.9	160,000	IIpec	Large Magellanic Cloud	Intense radiation reached Earth on February 23, 1987, 7:35:35 UT. Notable for archival photos of progenitor star and detection of supernova neutrinos. Most recent Local Group supernova
SN 1993J	Ursa Major	28 March 1993	+10.7	11,000,000	IIb	M81	One of the brightest supernovae in the northern sky since 1954
SN 1994D	Virgo	7 March 1994	+15.2	50,000,000	Ia	NGC 4526	
SN 1998bw	Telescopium	26 April 1998	?	140,000,000	Ic	ESO 184-G82	Linked to GRB 980425, which was the first time a gamma-ray burst has been linked to a supernova.
SN 1999eh	Lynx	12 October 1999	+18.3 +/- 0.3	84,000,000	I	NGC 2770	First supernovae in this galaxy, where 3 more were detected later.

== See also ==
- Lists of astronomical objects
- List of supernovae
- List of most distant supernovae
- List of supernova candidates
- List of supernova remnants
