= SN 2010lt =

Supernova in the constellation Camelopardalis

- Event type: Supernova
- Ia (sub-luminous)
- Date: 2 January 2011
- Constellation: Camelopardalis
- Right ascension: 06^{h} 06^{m} 09^{s}
- Declination: +83° 50′ 28″
- Epoch: J2000
- Distance: 240 Mly
- Remnant: ?
- Host: UGC 3378
- Progenitor: –
- Progenitor type: –
- Colour (B-V): Unknown
- Notable features: None
- Peak apparent magnitude: +17.0
- Other designations: SN 2010lt

SN 2010lt is a supernova located in the galaxy UGC 3378 in the constellation Camelopardalis. It was discovered by amateur astronomers Kathryn Aurora Gray, her father Paul Gray, of Fredericton, New Brunswick, Canada and David J. Lane of Stillwater Lake, Nova Scotia, Canada. Upon discovery, Kathryn Aurora Gray became the youngest person to ever discover a supernova, being 10 years old when she did so. The previous record was held by the 14-year-old Caroline Moore.

== Discovery ==
Host galaxy UGC 3378

The images of UGC 3378 were taken at Lane's Abbey Ridge Observatory on 31 December 2010 with a Celestron C14 0.36-meter f/5.5 telescope, and the supernova was spotted by them on 2 January 2011. The discovery was confirmed on 3 January 2011 by the amateur astronomers Brian Tieman and Jack Newton and announced by the IAU Central Bureau of Astronomical Telegrams at the Harvard–Smithsonian Center for Astrophysics, Cambridge, Massachusetts. It was announced by the Royal Astronomical Society of Canada on the same day.

=== Discoverers ===
- David J. Lane: SN 2010lt is Lane's fourth discovery of a supernova. The previous were SN 1995F, SN 2005B and SN 2005ea. All were discovered with Paul Gray.
- Paul Gray: SN 2010lt is his seventh discovery of a supernova.
- Kathryn Aurora Gray: her first discovery.

== Description ==
SN 2010lt is about 20" west and 10" north of the galaxy center. It is a sub-luminous (1991bg-like) Type Ia supernova and was discovered when near maximum light. The supernova could not be detected (detection limit approximately 18.5 of apparent magnitude) at its current position on images taken between October 2005 and March 2006.

== See also ==
- List of supernovae
