= NGC 1964 =

Galaxy in the constellation Lepus

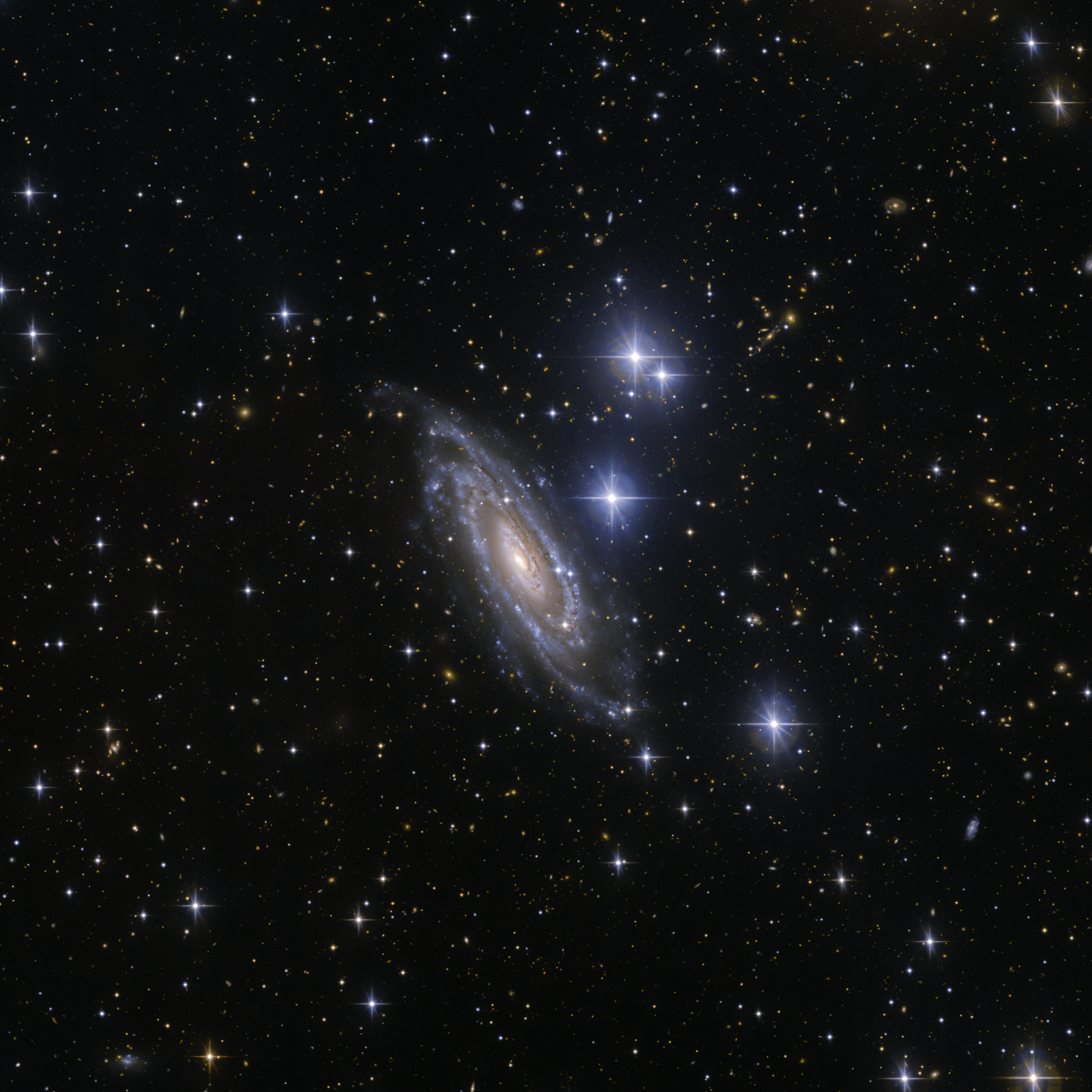
- NGC 1964 taken by MPG/ESO 2.2-meter telescope

Observation data (J2000 epoch)
- Constellation: Lepus
- Right ascension: 05^{h} 33^{m} 21.8^{s}
- Declination: −21° 56′ 45″
- Redshift: 1,659±3 km/s
- Distance: 65 ± 13 Mly (19.9 ± 4.0 Mpc)
- Apparent magnitude (V): 10.8

Characteristics
- Type: SAB(s)b
- Size: 149,500 ly (45.8 kpc)
- Apparent size (V): 5.6′ × 1.8′

Other designations
- ESO 554- G 010, IRAS 05312-2158, PGC 17436

NGC 1964 is a barred spiral galaxy in the constellation Lepus. The galaxy lies 65 million light years away from Earth, meaning, given its apparent dimensions, NGC 1964 is approximately 150,000 light years across. It was discovered by German-British astronomer William Herschel on 20 November 1784.

At the center of NGC 1964 lies a supermassive black hole, with an estimated mass of 2.5 × 10^{7} M_{☉}. The galaxy features two tightly wound inner spiral arms within a disk with high surface brightness and two outer, more open spiral arms that originate near the inner ring. The outer arms feature few small HII regions.

NGC 1964 is the main galaxy in a group of galaxies, known as the NGC 1964 group, which also includes the galaxies NGC 1979, IC 2130 and IC 2137.

== Supernova ==
One supernova has been observed in NGC 1964:

- SN 2021jad (Type Ia, mag. 15.419) was discovered by ATLAS on 11 April 2021.

== Gallery ==
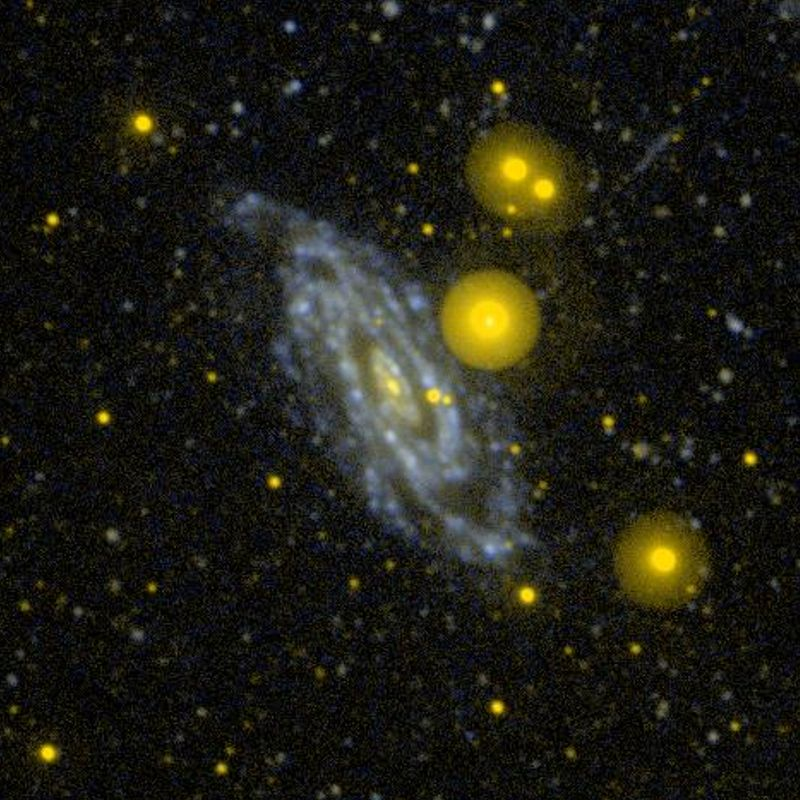
NGC 1964 by GALEX
