= NGC 2404 =

Large, emission nebula in the constellation Camelopardalis

Emission nebula
- H II region
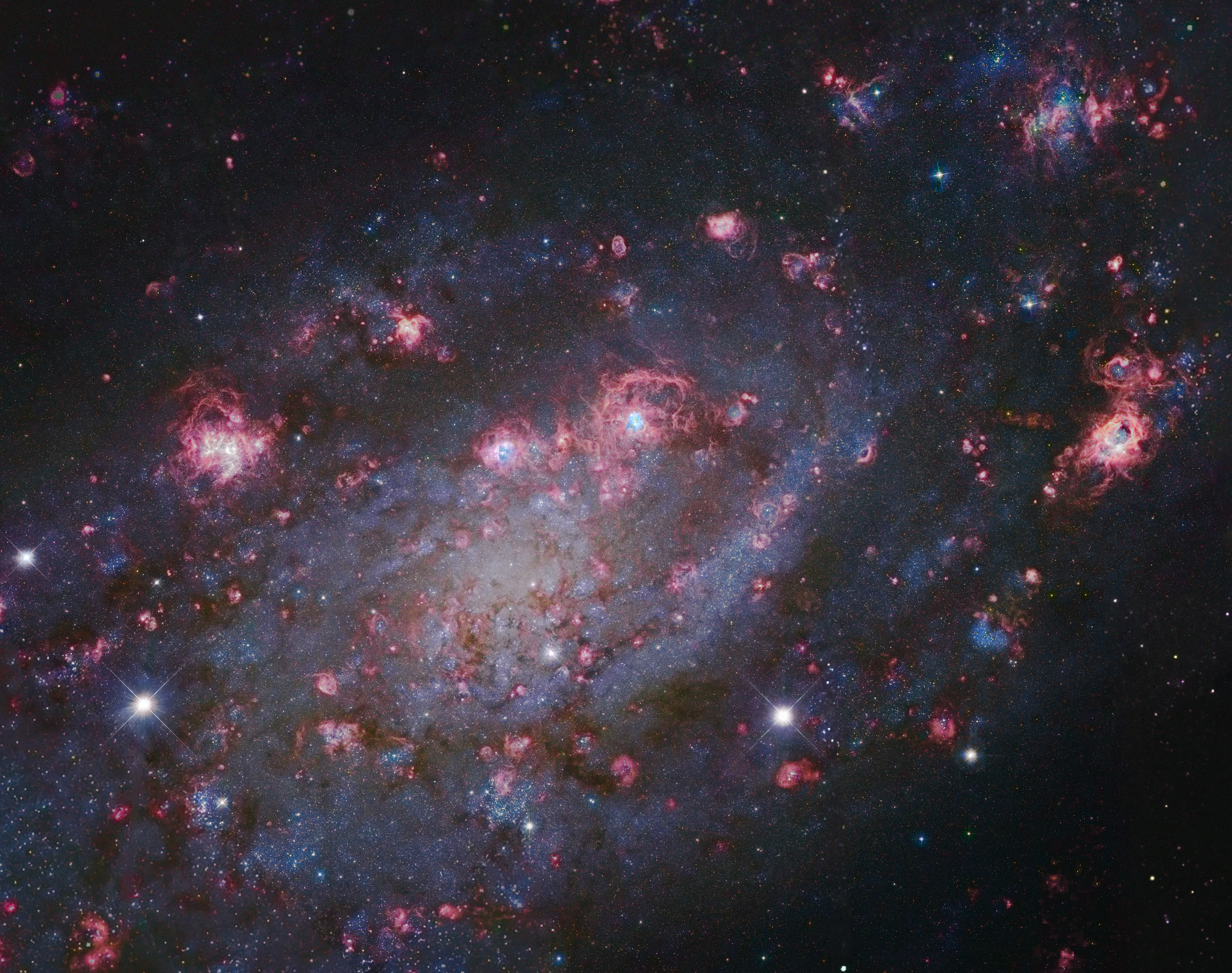
- NGC 2404 is the giant H II region to the left

Observation data: J2000 epoch
- Right ascension: 07^{h} 36^{m} 51.4^{s}
- Declination: +65° 36′ 09″
- Distance: 9,650,000 ly (2,960,000 pc)
- Apparent magnitude (V): +16.9
- Apparent dimensions (V): 20 arcsecs
- Constellation: Camelopardalis

Physical characteristics
- Radius: 470 (estimated) ly
- Absolute magnitude (V): -14.5
- Notable features: Massive H II region, the largest one in NGC 2403.

NGC 2404 is a massive H II region inside NGC 2403, a spiral galaxy in Camelopardalis. It was discovered on February 2, 1886 by Gulliaume Bigourdan. NGC 2404 is approximately 940 ly in diameter, making it one of the largest H II regions so far known. It is the largest H II region in NGC 2403, and lies at the outskirts of the galaxy, making for a striking similarity with NGC 604 in M33, both in size and location in the host galaxy. This H II region contains 30-40 Wolf-Rayet stars, and unlike the Tarantula Nebula, but similar to NGC 604, NGC 2404's open cluster is probably much less compact, so it probably looks like a large stellar association. This H II region is probably only a few million years old.
