= David J. Lane (astronomer) =

Canadian astronomer

- Born: August 23, 1963; Iserlohn, Germany
- Died: 24 March 2024 (aged 60); Upper Tantallon, Nova Scotia, Canada
- Website: www.smu.ca/giving/david-lane.html

Dr. David J. Lane (born 1963) was a Canadian astronomer at Saint Mary's University, the past president of the Royal Astronomical Society of Canada, director of the Burke-Gaffney astronomical observatory, owner of the Abbey-Ridge Observatory, and creator of the planetarium software entitled the Earth Centered Universe. Asteroid 117032 Davidlane is named in his honour, and the asteroid lies in the main asteroid belt between Mars and Jupiter. He was awarded Doctor of Science, honoris causa, on January 27, 2024 by Saint Mary's University.

Lane created the first software that enables Twitter users to request images of the Universe from an astronomical observatory (i.e., the Burke-Gaffney Observatory). The impetus is to foster awareness of the Universe, by enabling citizens to readily access an observatory using social media, a project that has been heralded as an important innovation by international media.

Lane, and fellow Canadian astronomer Paul Gray, discovered supernovas 1995F in NGC 2726, SN 2005B in UGC 11066, and 2005ea in MCG+10-16-61. Kathryn Aurora Gray examined images acquired by Lane via his Abbey Ridge Observatory and discovered a supernova in UGC 3378 (SN 2010lt). Kathryn subsequently became the youngest person to have discovered a supernova.

Lane was a featured guest on comet hunter David H. Levy's internet radio show: Let's Talk Stars.

Observations from Lane's astronomical observatory have also been used to improve the cosmic distance ladder.

Lane died on March 24, 2024.
