= SN 1972E =

Supernova in the NGC 523 galaxy, first observed in 1972

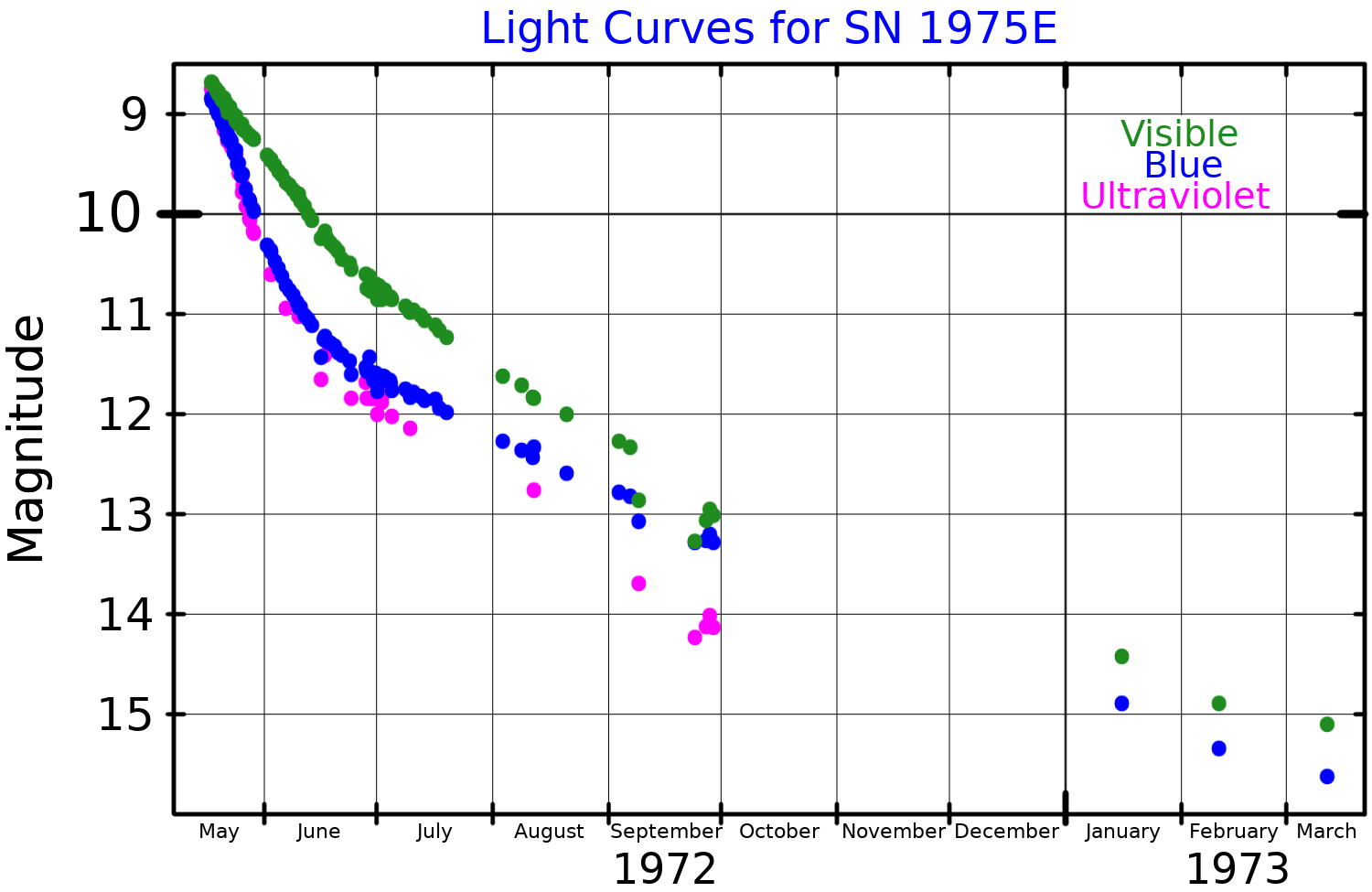
- Light curves for SN 1972E in visual, blue and ultraviolet light, plotted from data published by Younger and van den Bergh (1985)
- Event type: Supernova
- SNIa
- Constellation: Centaurus
- Other designations: SN 1972E, AAVSO 1334-31

SN 1972E was a supernova in the galaxy NGC 5253 that was discovered 13 May 1972 with an apparent B magnitude of about 8.5, shortly after it had reached its maximum brightness. In terms of apparent brightness, it was the second-brightest supernova of any kind (fainter only than SN 1987A) of the 20th century. It was observed for nearly 700 days, and it became the prototype object for the development of theoretical understanding of Type Ia supernovae.

== Background ==
The supernova was discovered by Charles Kowal, about 56 arc seconds west and 85 arc seconds south of the center of NGC 5253. The position in the periphery of the galaxy aided observation, minimizing interference by background objects. Well-positioned for Southern Hemisphere observers, it was quite observable from Northern Hemisphere observatories as well. Attempts made to observe it in X-rays with Uhuru and OSO 7 and to detect gamma rays from it via Cherenkov radiation showers gave at best equivocal results.

Photometric and spectroscopic measurements were made in the visible and near infrared by many observers, extending to about 700 days after maximum light. Interstellar absorption lines of ionized calcium due to gas both in our galaxy and NGC 5253 were observed, allowing an estimate of the interstellar extinction.

The extended length of the observed light curve found a remarkably uniform 0.01 magnitudes per day decline starting about 60 days after discovery. Translated into other units, this is almost exactly a 77-day half-life, which is the half-life of ^{56}Co. In the standard model for Type Ia supernovae, approximately a solar mass of ^{56}Ni is formed and ejected from a white dwarf which accretes mass from a binary companion and is raised over the Chandrasekhar limit and explodes. This ^{56}Ni decays with a half-life of about 6 days to ^{56}Co, and the decay of the cobalt provides the energy radiated away by the supernova remnant. The model also produces an estimate for the luminosity of such a supernova. The observations of SN1972e, both peak brightness and fade rate, were in general agreement with these predictions, and led to rapid acceptance of this degenerate-explosion model.

== See also ==
- List of supernovae that are of historical significance
