= NGC 4415 =

Galaxy in the constellation Virgo

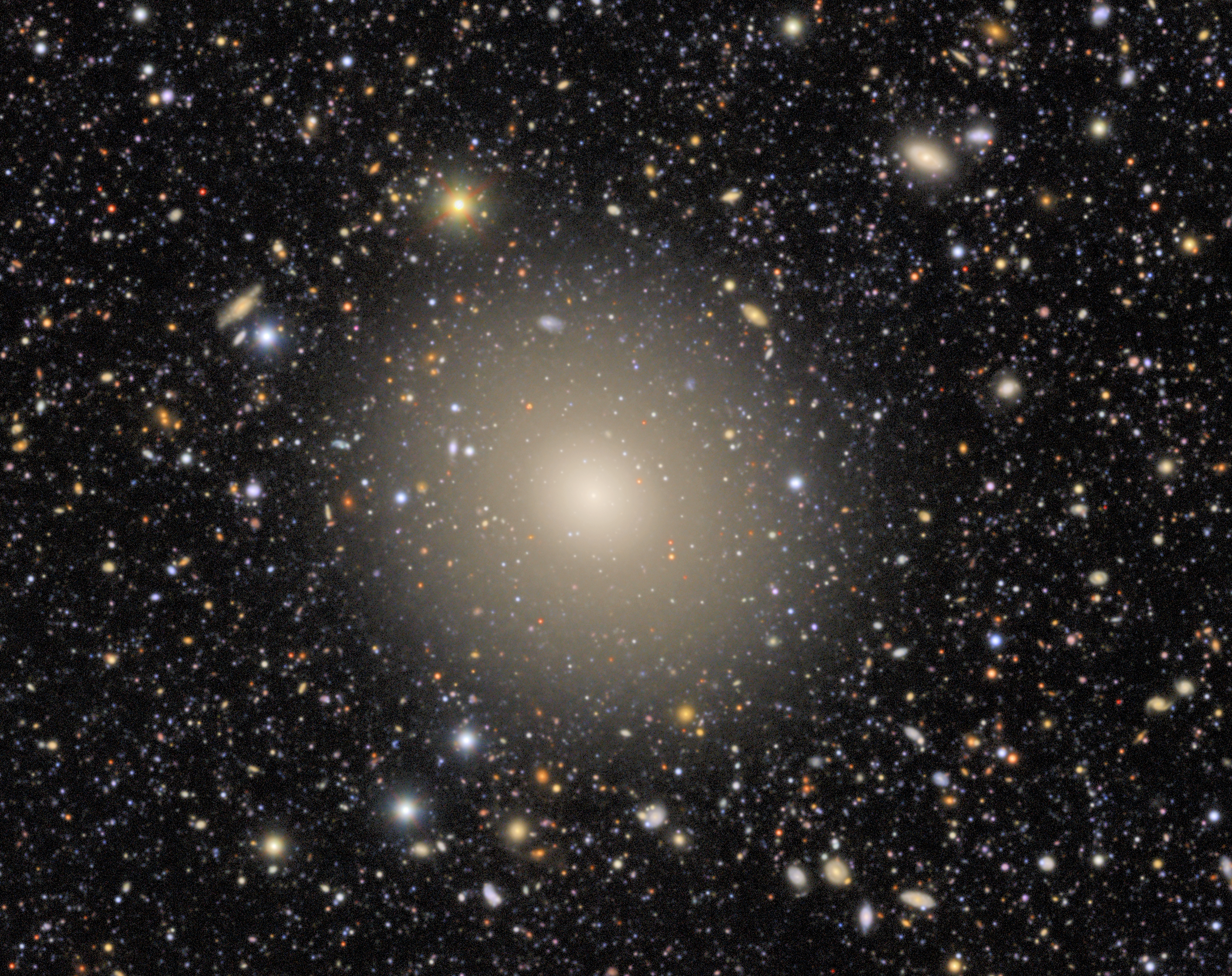
- NGC 4415 imaged by the Vera C. Rubin Observatory

Observation data (J2000 epoch)
- Constellation: Virgo
- Right ascension: 12^{h} 26^{m} 40.5369^{s}
- Declination: +08° 26′ 08.868″
- Redshift: 0.003011±0.00000967
- Heliocentric radial velocity: 903±3 km/s
- Distance: 52.19 ± 3.59 Mly (16.000 ± 1.100 Mpc)
- Group or cluster: Virgo cluster
- Apparent magnitude (V): 13.8g

Characteristics
- Type: S0/a
- Size: ~26,400 ly (8.08 kpc) (estimated)
- Apparent size (V): 1.22′ × 0.99′

Other designations
- VCC 929, UGC 7540, MCG +02-32-052, PGC 40727, CGCG 070-078

NGC 4415 is a lenticular galaxy in the constellation of Virgo. Its velocity with respect to the cosmic microwave background is 1,241±24 km/s, which corresponds to a Hubble distance of 59.7 ± 4.3 Mly (18.31 ± 1.33 Mpc). Additionally, two non-redshift measurements give a closer mean distance of 52.2 ± 3.6 Mly (16.0 ± 1.1 Mpc). It was discovered by German-British astronomer William Herschel on 28 December 1785.

NGC 4415 is a member of the Virgo cluster, and is listed as VCC 929.

== Supernova ==
One supernova has been observed in NGC 4415:

- SN 2022pul (Type Ia, mag. 15.9) was discovered by ASAS-SN on 26 July 2022. It got as bright as magnitude 12.1, making it the brightest supernova of 2022.

== See also ==
- List of NGC objects (4001–5000)
