= NGC 1979 =

Elliptical galaxy in the constellation Lepus

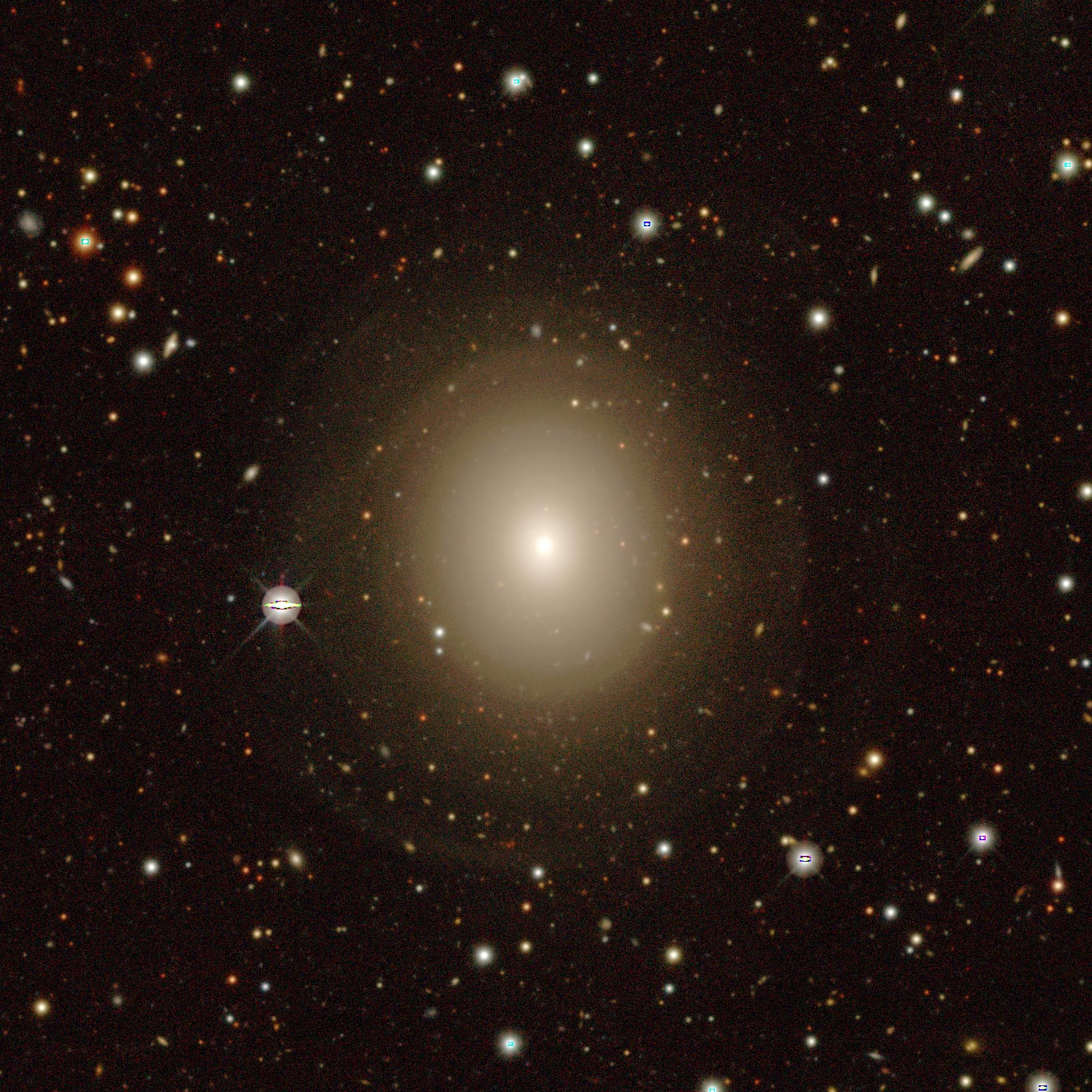
- legacy surveys image of NGC 1979

Observation data (J2000.0 epoch)
- Constellation: Lepus
- Right ascension: 05^{h} 34^{m} 01.1^{s}
- Declination: −23° 18′ 36″
- Redshift: 0.005667
- Heliocentric radial velocity: 1799
- Distance: 101.1 Mly (31.0 Mpc)
- Apparent magnitude (V): 12.84
- Apparent magnitude (B): 11.8

Characteristics
- Type: SO
- Size: 1.80 x 1.80

Other designations
- ESO 487-24, MCG -4-14-4, AM 0531-232, PGC 17452

NGC 1979 (also known as ESO 487-24) is a lenticular galaxy in the constellation Lepus. It is about 78 million light-years from the Milky Way. It was discovered by William Herschel on 20 November 1784 and its size is 1.8 by 1.8 arc minutes.
