= NGC 4866 =

Galaxy in the constellation Virgo

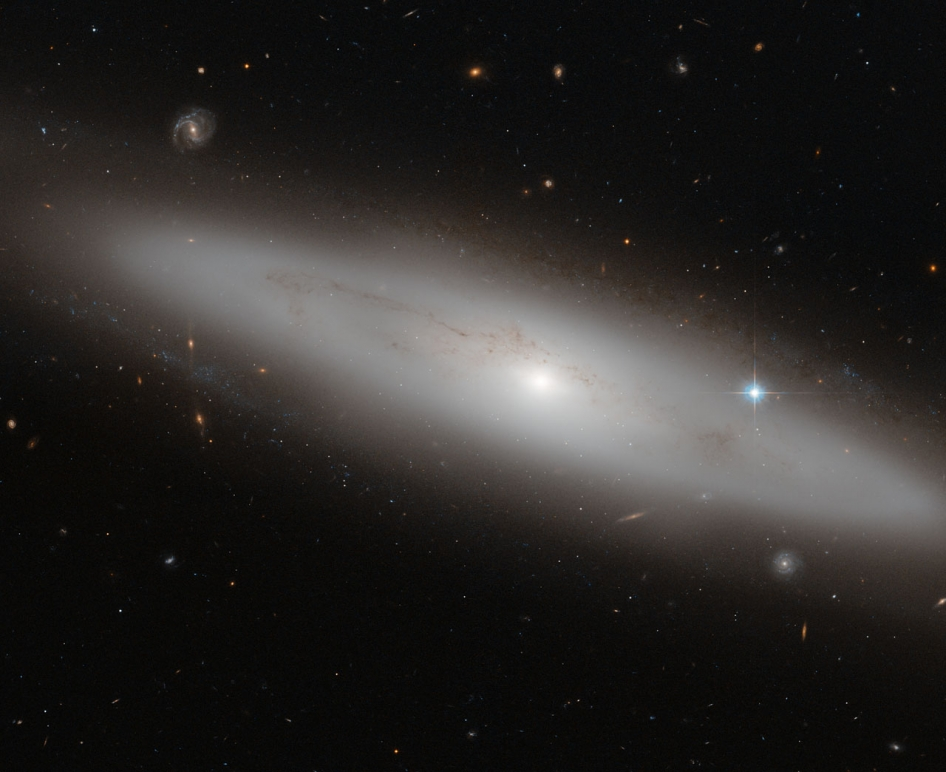
- HST image of NGC 4866

Observation data (J2000 epoch)
- Constellation: Virgo
- Right ascension: 12^{h} 59^{m} 27.140^{s}
- Declination: +14° 10′ 15.78″
- Redshift: 0.006615
- Heliocentric radial velocity: 1977 km/s
- Distance: 101.27 ± 0.65 Mly (31.05 ± 0.20 Mpc)
- Group or cluster: Virgo Cluster
- Apparent magnitude (V): 11.08
- Apparent magnitude (B): 12.00

Characteristics
- Type: SA0^{+}(r):
- Apparent size (V): 5.8′ × 0.95′

Other designations
- UGC 8102, MCG +02-33-045, PGC 44600

NGC 4866 is an unbarred lenticular galaxy located roughly 100 million light-years away in the constellation Virgo. It was first observed by British astronomer Sir William Herschel on January 14, 1787. It is a member of the Virgo Cluster.

On April 1, 2015, a bright source was discovered by the All Sky Automated Survey for SuperNovae (ASAS-SN) program, and was designated ASASSN-15ga. The source is likely a type Ia supernova.

== Gallery ==
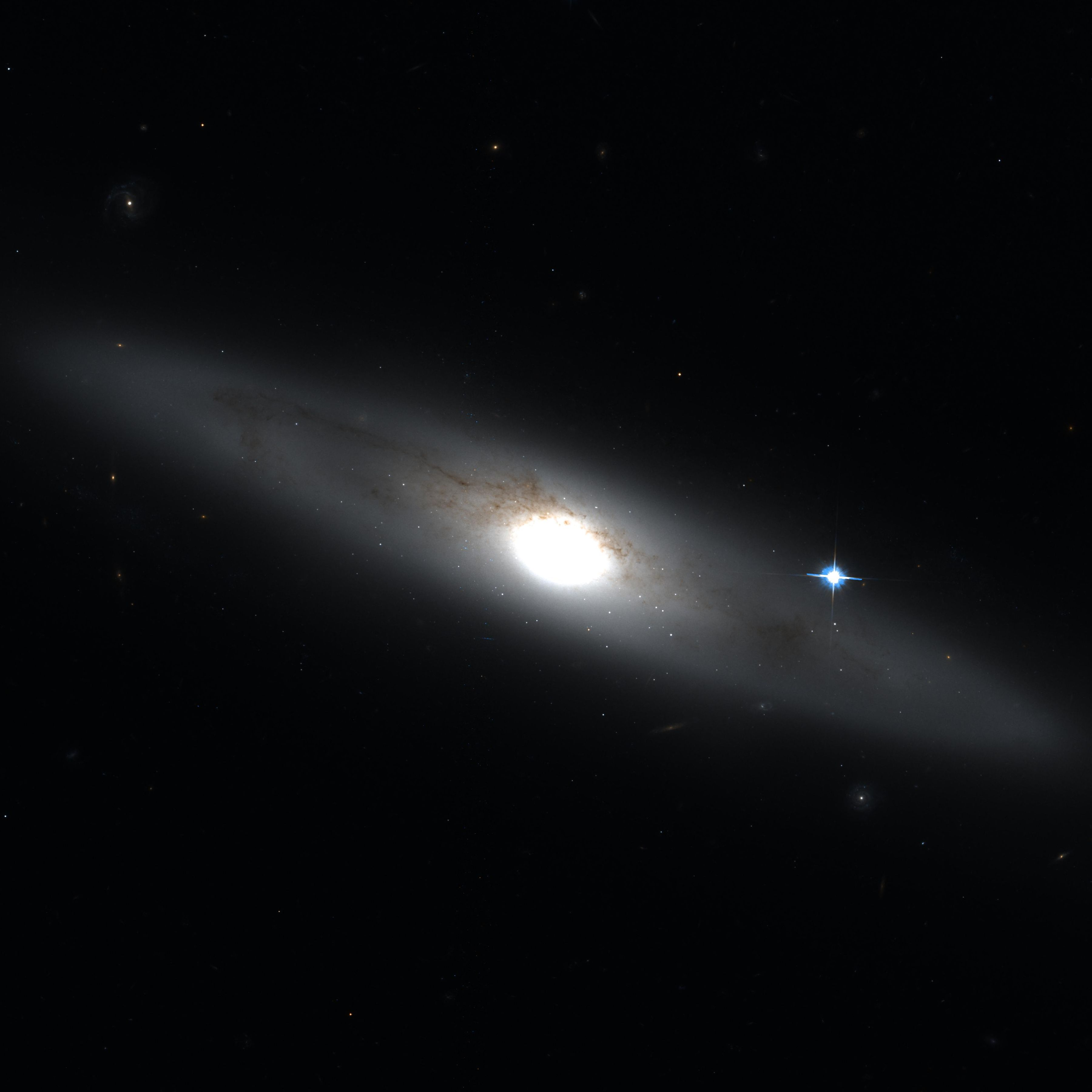
NGC 4866 by Hubble Space Telescope

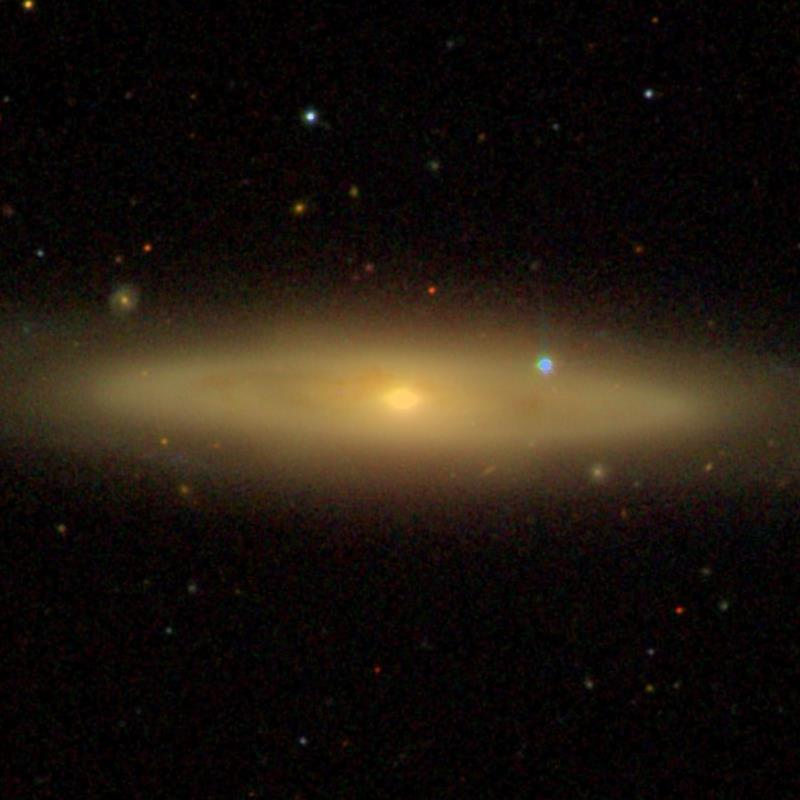
NGC 4866 by the Sloan Digital Sky Survey

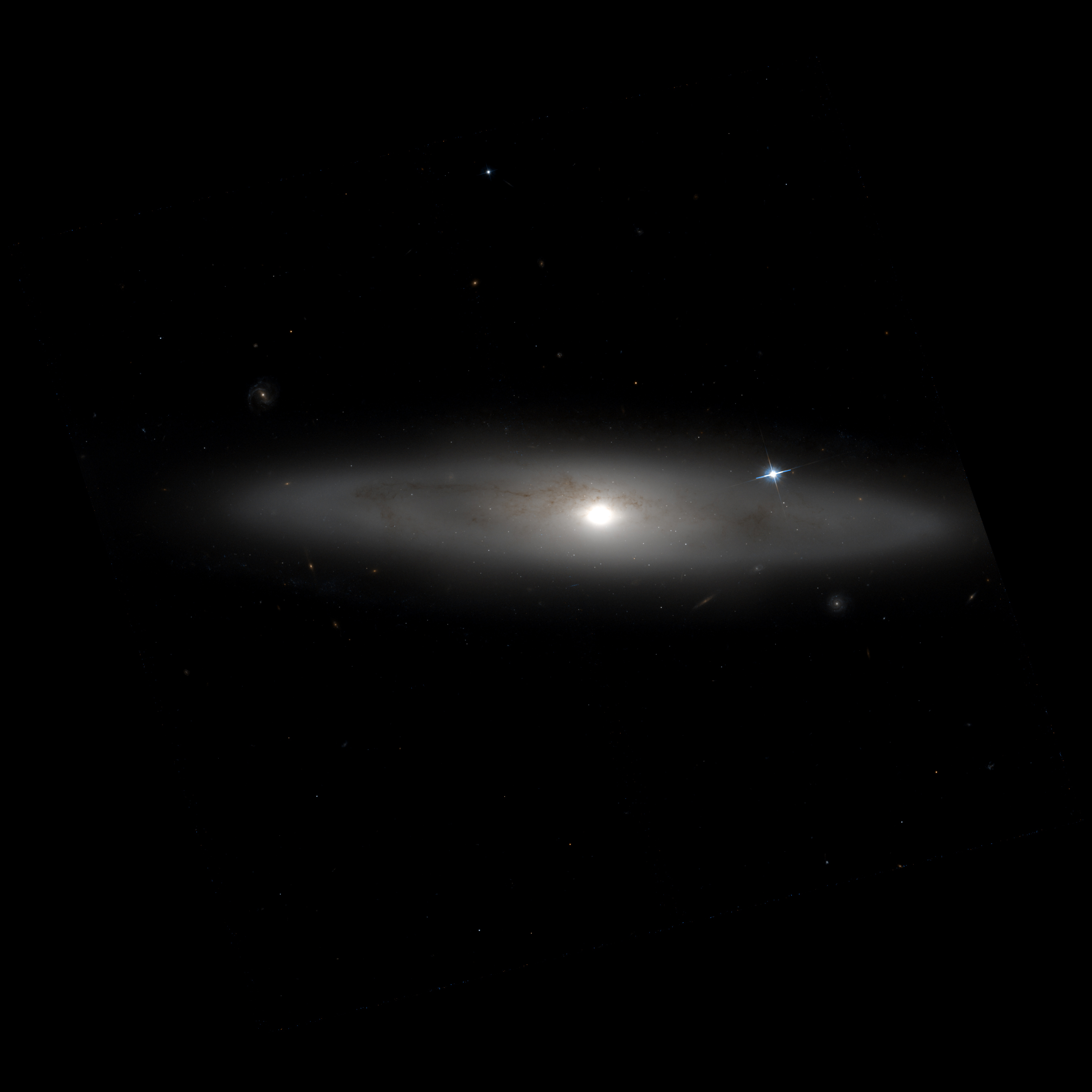
NGC 4866 (HST)
