= SN 2002bj =

Supernova

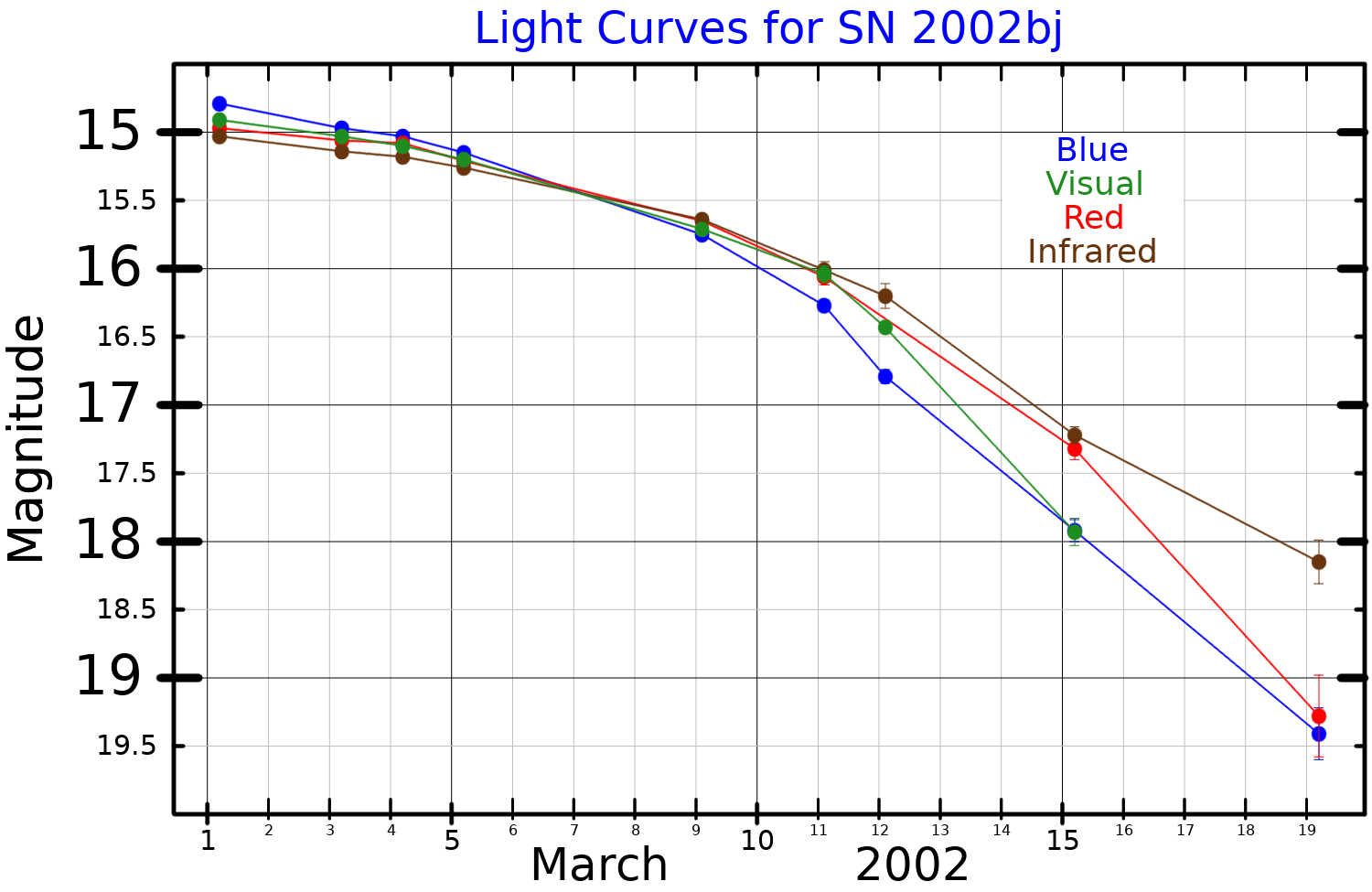
- Light curves in four photometric bands for SN 2002bj, plotted from data published by Poznanski et al.
- Event type: Supernova, variable star
- Ia
- Constellation: Lepus
- Right ascension: 05^{h} 11^{m} 46.41^{s}
- Declination: −15° 08′ 10.8″
- Epoch: J2000
- Other designations: SN 2002bj, AAVSO 0507-15

SN 2002bj was the explosion of a star in the galaxy NGC 1821, located in the constellation Lepus. The explosion was discovered by Jack Newton in scans of images produced by Tim Puckett. (It was independently discovered by the Lick/Tenagra Observatory as part of their combined supernova search program.) Initially it had an apparent magnitude of about 14.7 and was categorized as a Type IIn supernova. However, in 2008 Dovi Poznanski discovered that the spectrum more closely resembled a Type Ia supernova. Further, the energy output was much lower than a typical supernova and the luminosity dropped at a dramatic pace.

A team consisting of Poznanski, Joshua Bloom, Alex Filippenko and others concluded that it was a new category of exploding star. This system is believed to consist of a binary pair of white dwarf stars, with helium being transferred from one dwarf to the other. The accreted helium exploded in a thermonuclear reaction on the surface of the more massive white dwarf, resulting in the observed outburst. In this sense, it was akin to a nova explosion, although the magnitude of the explosion was a thousand times greater. In 2007 Lars Bildsten et al. had predicted this category of explosion would occur in AM Canum Venaticorum star binary systems.

NGC 1821 is an irregular galaxy categorized as type IB(s)m. It is apparent magnitude 14.5 and has a redshift of 0.012029. This galaxy is located about 48 megaparsecs from the Earth.
