= SN 2005B =

2005 supernova event in the constellation Draco

- Event type: Supernova
- II
- Date: 12 January 2005
- Constellation: Draco
- Right ascension: 17^{h} 54^{m} 48.8^{s}
- Declination: +71° 32′ 35″
- Epoch: J2000.0
- Galactic coordinates: 102.15 +30.10
- Distance: 100 Mly
- Remnant: ?
- Host: UGC 11066
- Progenitor: -
- Progenitor type: Unknown
- Colour (B-V): Unknown
- Notable features: None
- Peak apparent magnitude: +18
- Other designations: SN 2005B

SN 2005B, the second supernova discovered in 2005, was discovered by amateur astronomer Paul Gray, of Fredericton, New Brunswick, Canada, upon reviewing film shot by fellow amateur astronomer David J. Lane, at his backyard observatory in Stillwater Lake, Nova Scotia, Canada. It was located in the galaxy UGC 11066 in Draco.
