= NGC 2325 =

Galaxy in the constellation Canis Major

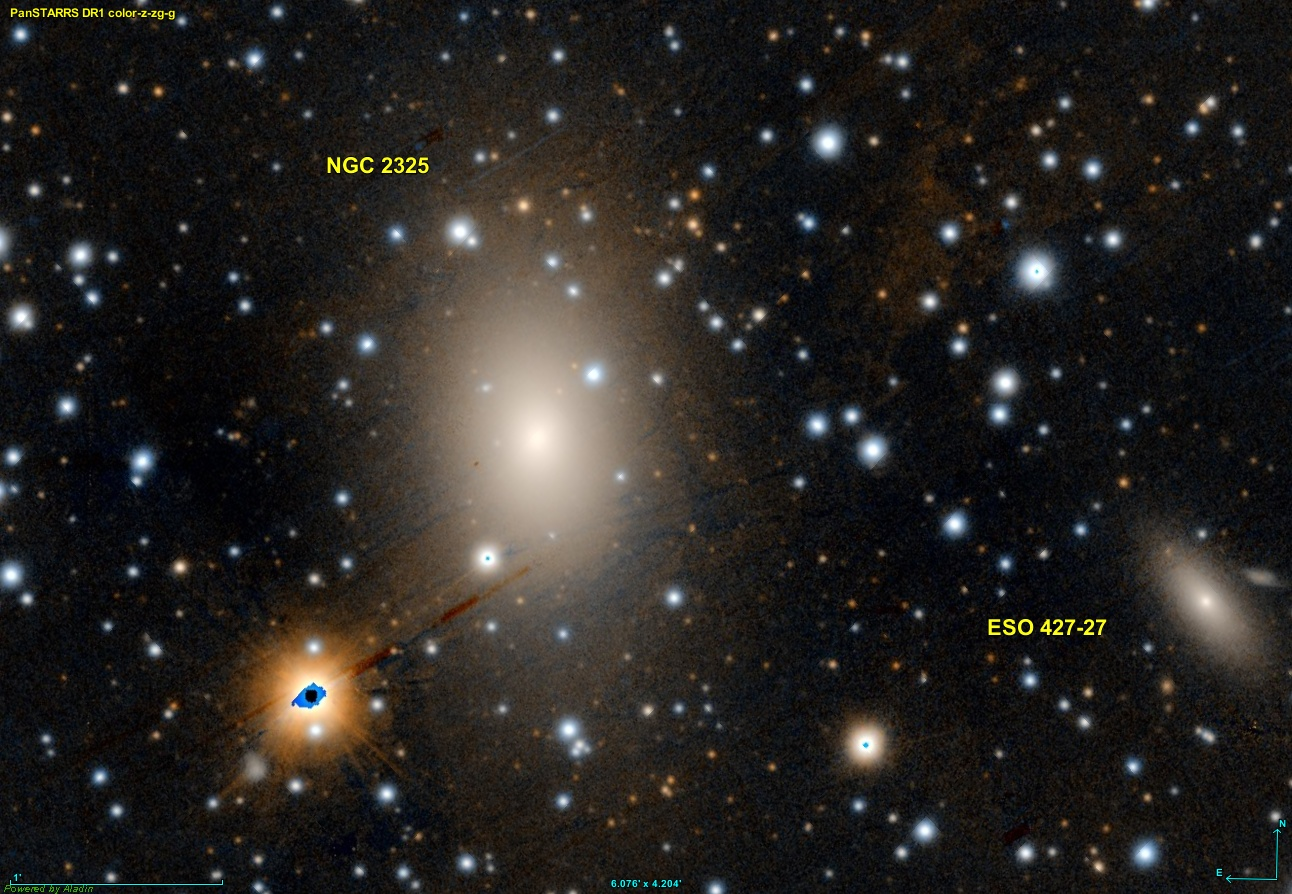
- NGC 2325 imaged by Pan-STARRS

Observation data (J2000 epoch)
- Constellation: Canis Major
- Right ascension: 07^{h} 02^{m} 40.4030^{s}
- Declination: −28° 41′ 50.048″
- Redshift: 0.007288±0.0000730
- Heliocentric radial velocity: 2,185±22 km/s
- Distance: 74.53 ± 3.94 Mly (22.850 ± 1.209 Mpc)
- Group or cluster: [CHM2007] HDC 421
- Apparent magnitude (V): 12.38

Characteristics
- Type: E4
- Size: ~157,700 ly (48.36 kpc) (estimated)
- Apparent size (V): 3.3′ × 1.9′

Other designations
- ESO 427- G 028, 2MASX J07024038-2841501, MCG -05-17-005, PGC 20047

NGC 2325 is an elliptical galaxy in the constellation of Canis Major. Its velocity with respect to the cosmic microwave background is 2,356±25 km/s, which corresponds to a Hubble distance of 113.4 ± 8.1 Mly (34.76 ± 2.48 Mpc). However, 16 non-redshift measurements give a much closer mean distance of 74.53 ± 3.94 Mly (22.850 ± 1.209 Mpc). It was discovered by British astronomer John Herschel on 1 February 1837.

NGC 2325 is a radio galaxy, i.e. it has giant regions of radio emission extending well beyond its visible structure. It also has an active galactic nucleus, i.e. it has a compact region at the center of a galaxy that emits a significant amount of energy across the electromagnetic spectrum, with characteristics indicating that this luminosity is not produced by the stars.

== Galaxy group ==
NGC 2325 is a member of a galaxy group known as [CHM2007] HDC 421. The group contains at least eight galaxies, including IC 456, ESO 427-22, MCG-05-17-006, MCG-05-17-004, MCG-05-17-008, and two others.

== Supernova ==
One supernova has been observed in NGC 2325:

- SN 2010ih (Type Ia, mag. 13.3) was discovered by The CHilean Automatic Supernova sEarch (CHASE) on 29 September 2010. A prediscovery image taken on 16 September showed it at magnitude 12.8, making it the brightest supernova of 2010.

== See also ==
- List of NGC objects (2001–3000)
