= NGC 7625 =

Peculiar galaxy in the constellation Pegasus

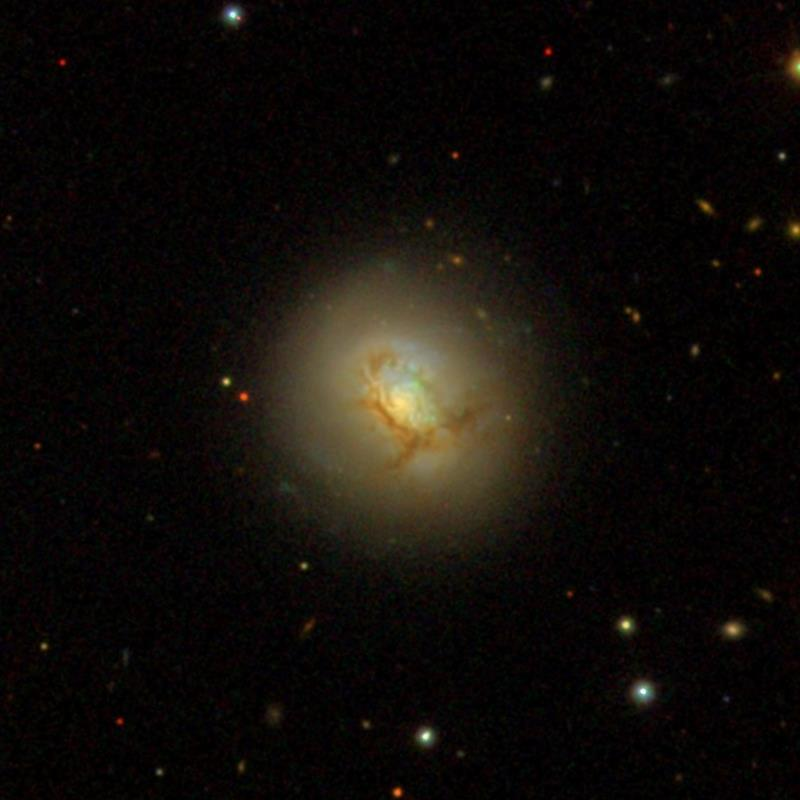
- Sloan Digital Sky Survey image of NGC 7625

Observation data (J2000 epoch)
- Constellation: Pegasus
- Right ascension: 23^{h} 20^{m} 30.132^{s}
- Declination: +17° 13′ 32.16″
- Heliocentric radial velocity: 1,630±3 km/s
- Distance: 78.3 ± 7.5 Mly (24.0 ± 2.3 Mpc)
- Apparent magnitude (V): 12.9
- Apparent magnitude (B): 12.94

Characteristics
- Type: Sa/S pec
- Mass/Light ratio: 2.5 M_{☉}/L_{☉}
- Apparent size (V): 1.6′ × 1.4′

Other designations
- NGC 7625, Arp 212, UGC 12529, LEDA 71133, MCG +03-59-038, PGC 71133

NGC 7625, or Arp 212, is a peculiar galaxy in the constellation of Pegasus. It was discovered on October 15, 1784, by William Herschel. In his New General Catalogue (1888), J. L. E. Dreyer described it as pretty bright, considerably small, round, with a suddenly much brighter middle. It is located at an estimated distance of 78 million light-years (24.0 megaparsecs) from the Milky Way galaxy.

Halton Arp included NGC 7625 as object 212 in his Atlas of Peculiar Galaxies, indicating it displayed unexplained physical processes. In the Third Reference Catalogue of Bright Galaxies, NGC 7625 was assigned a morphological classification of SA(rs)a pec, which indicates a peculiar spiral galaxy (SA) with a transitional ring structure (rs) and tightly wound spiral arms (a). In 1981 it was designated a blue compact dwarf by T. X. Thaun and G. E. Martin on the basis of strong emission lines from ionized gas. A prominent visible feature is an open ring of dust lanes with an angular radius of about 15″–20″.

NGC 7625 displays indications of a recent interaction with another galaxy. Velocity measurements suggest the inner part of the galaxy is rotating in a different plane than the outer parts. The angle between these two planes increases with distance from the galactic center, reaching 50° at a radius of 6 kpc. Hence this may be a polar-ring galaxy, with the added gas accreted from the dwarf satellite galaxy UGC 12549. There is a large amount of gas and dust undergoing significant star formation, with emission of H-alpha concentrated at the core and in separate knots along exterior curved structures.

On October 28, 2023 Type Ia supernova SN 2023vyl was discovered in this galaxy by ATLAS.
