= NGC 2525 =

Galaxy in the constellation Puppis

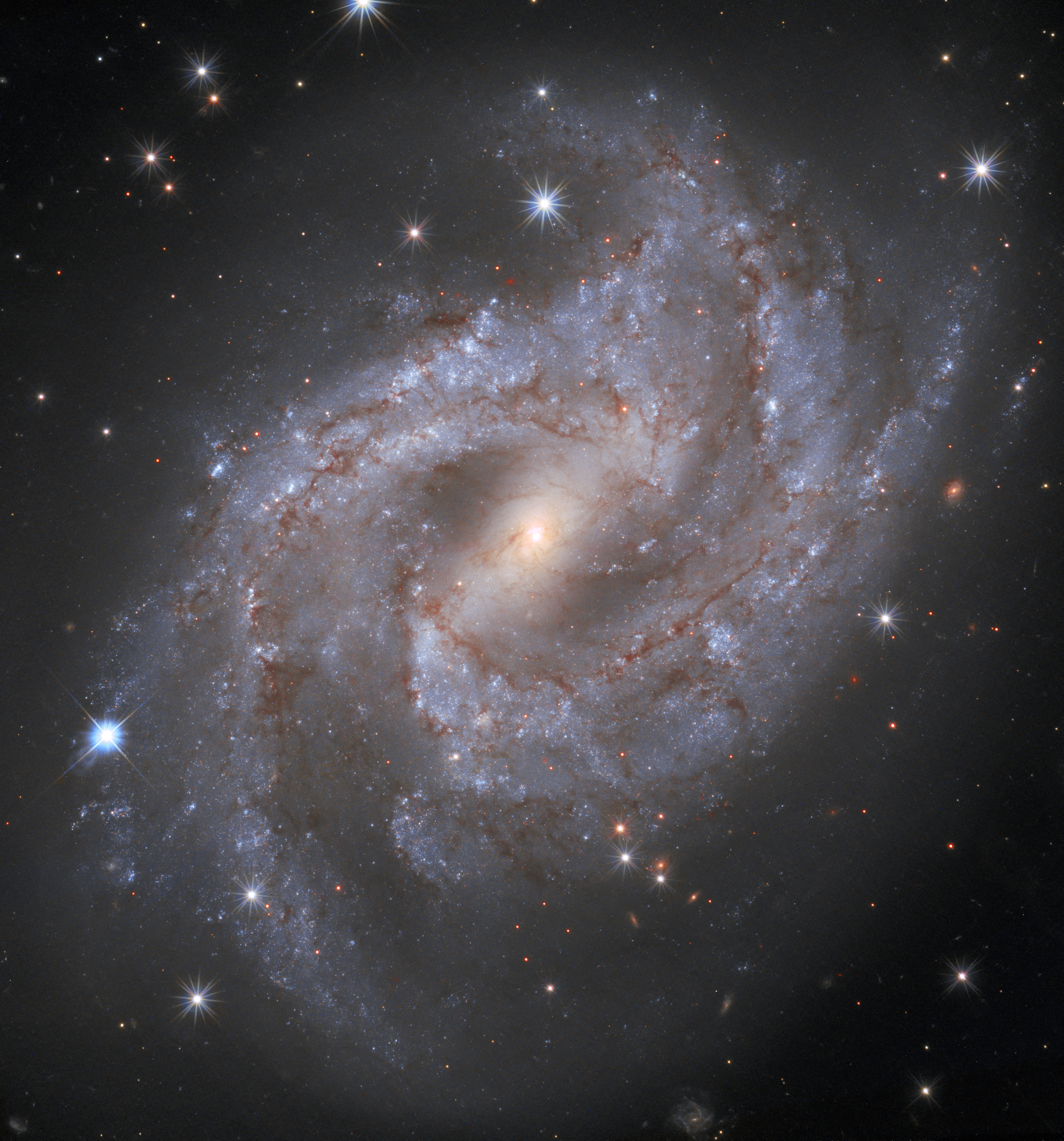
- NGC 2525 in 2018, imaged by the Hubble Space Telescope with SN 2018gv on Lower Left

Observation data (J2000 epoch)
- Constellation: Puppis
- Right ascension: 08^{h} 05^{m} 38.0503^{s}
- Declination: −11° 25′ 37.213″
- Redshift: 0.005270 ± 0.000005
- Heliocentric radial velocity: 1,580 ± 1 km/s
- Distance: 71 Mly (21.9 Mpc)
- Apparent magnitude (V): 11.6

Characteristics
- Type: SB(s)c
- Size: ~46,200 ly (14.16 kpc) (estimated)
- Apparent size (V): 2.9′ × 1.9′

Other designations
- IRAS 08032-1117, UGCA 135, MCG -02-21-004, PGC 22721

NGC 2525 is a barred spiral galaxy located in the constellation Puppis. It is located at a distance of about 70 million light years from Earth, which, given its apparent dimensions, means that NGC 2525 is about 46,000 light years across. It was discovered by William Herschel on February 23, 1791.

== Properties ==
The galaxy has a bar and two main spiral arms with high surface brightness. HII regions are observed in the arms. The brightest stars of the galaxy have apparent magnitude around 22. Its nucleus is small and bright. In the centre of the galaxy is predicted to lie a supermassive black hole whose mass is estimated to be between 1.1 and 44 million solar masses, based on the spiral arm pitch angle.

== SN 2018gv ==
Light curve for SN 2018gv

One supernova has been observed in NGC 2525, SN 2018gv. It was discovered by Kōichi Itagaki on 15 January 2018 at magnitude 16.5, and it was identified spectrographically as a Type Ia supernova 10 to 15 days before maximum. The supernova was also observed by ATLAS on 2018 January 14.5 UT at magnitude 18.1. It reached a peak magnitude of 12.8. ESA/Hubble released a video of the supernova in October 2020.

== See also ==
- List of NGC objects (2001–3000)
