= NGC 3310 =

Galaxy in the constellation Ursa Major

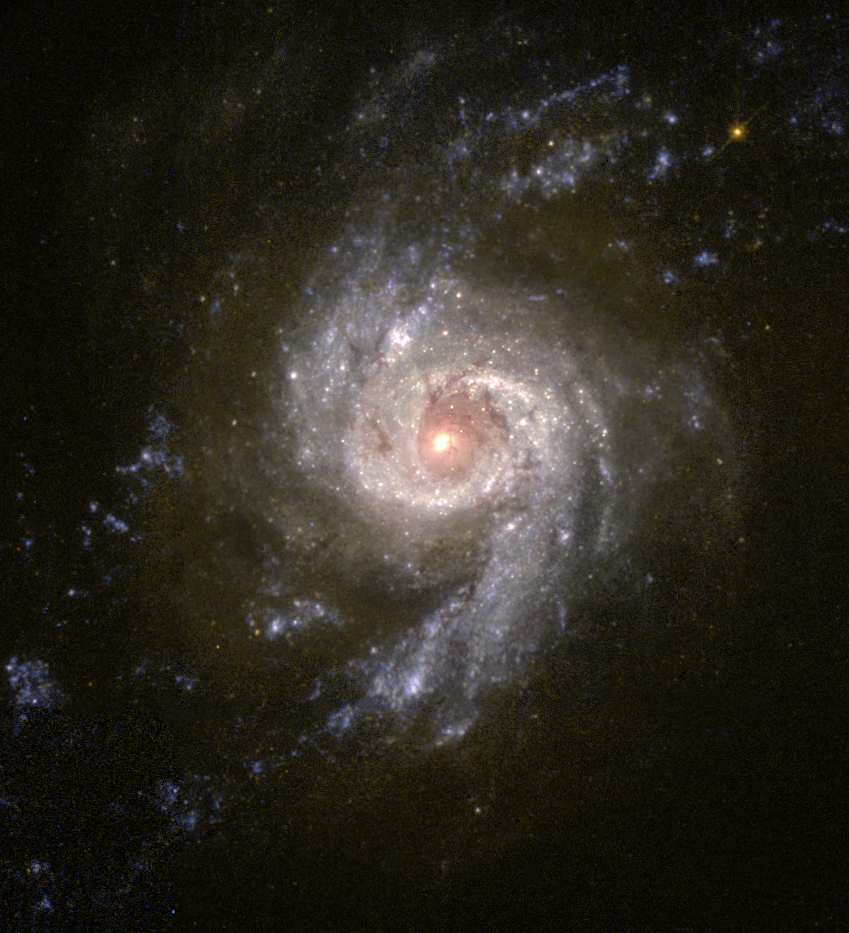
- NGC 3310 imaged by the Hubble Space Telescope

Observation data (J2000 epoch)
- Constellation: Ursa Major
- Right ascension: 10^{h} 38^{m} 45.857^{s}
- Declination: +53° 30′ 11.89″
- Redshift: 0.003309
- Heliocentric radial velocity: 989±1 km/s
- Distance: 42.73 ± 3.72 Mly (13.100 ± 1.142 Mpc)
- Apparent magnitude (V): 10.6

Characteristics
- Type: SAB(r)bc pec or SAcd
- Size: ~47,200 ly (14.48 kpc) (estimated)
- Apparent size (V): 3.1′ × 2.4′

Other designations
- IRAS 10356+5345, 2MASX J10384585+5330118, Arp 217, UGC 5786, MCG +09-18-008, PGC 31650, CGCG 267-004, VV 356 and 406

NGC 3310, also known as the Bow and Arrow Galaxy, is a grand design spiral galaxy in the constellation Ursa Major. Its velocity with respect to the cosmic microwave background is 1,169±13 km/s, which corresponds to a Hubble distance of 56.3 ± 4.0 Mly (17.25 ± 1.22 Mpc). However, eight non-redshift measurements give a closer mean distance of 42.73 ± 3.72 Mly (13.100 ± 1.142 Mpc). It was discovered by German-British astronomer William Herschel on 12 April 1789.

NGC 3310 is a starburst galaxy and it is likely that it collided with one of its satellite galaxies about 100 million years ago, triggering widespread star formation. The ring clusters of NGC 3310 have been undergoing starburst activity for at least the last 40 million years.

== Supernovae ==
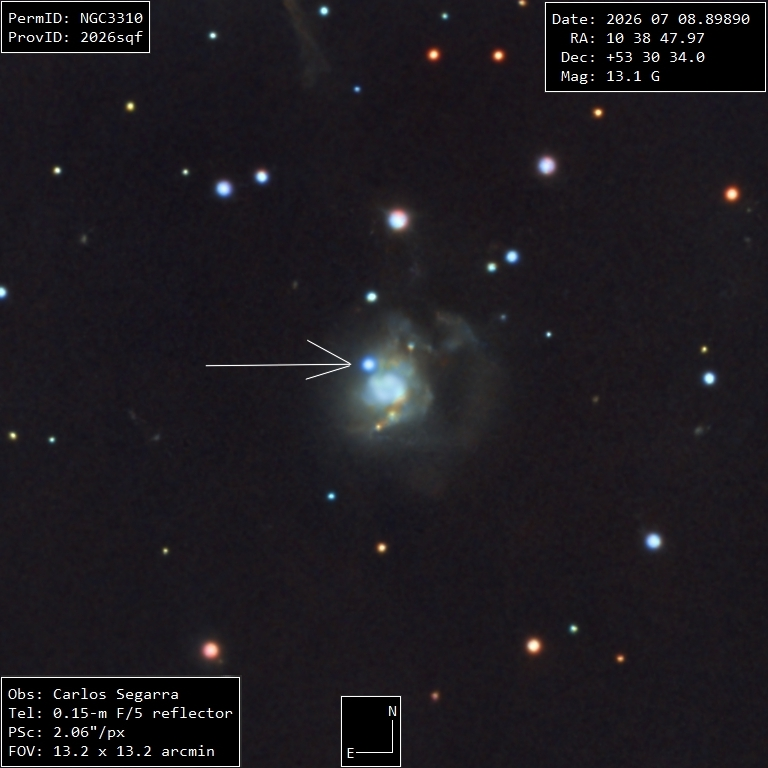
SN 2026sqf imaged on 8 July 2026

Four supernovae have been discovered in NGC 3310:

- SN 1974C (type unknown, mag. 16.5) was discovered by Pieter van der Kruit and Halton Arp on 25 February 1974. (Note: Some sources incorrectly list the discovery date as 26 February 1974.)
- SN 1991N (Type Ib/c, mag. 15) was discovered by the Berkeley Automated Supernova Search on 29 March 1991 at an offset of 5″ east and 7″ south of the galactic nucleus.
- SN 2021gmj (Type II-P, mag. 15.1) was discovered by the Distance Less Than 40 Mpc Survey (DLT40) on 20 March 2021.
- SN 2026sqf (Type Ia-CSM, mag. 12.9) was discovered by American amateur astronomer Patrick Wiggins on 8 July 2026. It had originally been classified as Type II, but later analysis concluded it to be type Type Ia-CSM, the closest yet known of this kind. SN 2026sqf is part of the Unistellar "cosmic cataclysms" smart telescope tracking project.
