= NGC 3861 =

Galaxy in the constellation Leo

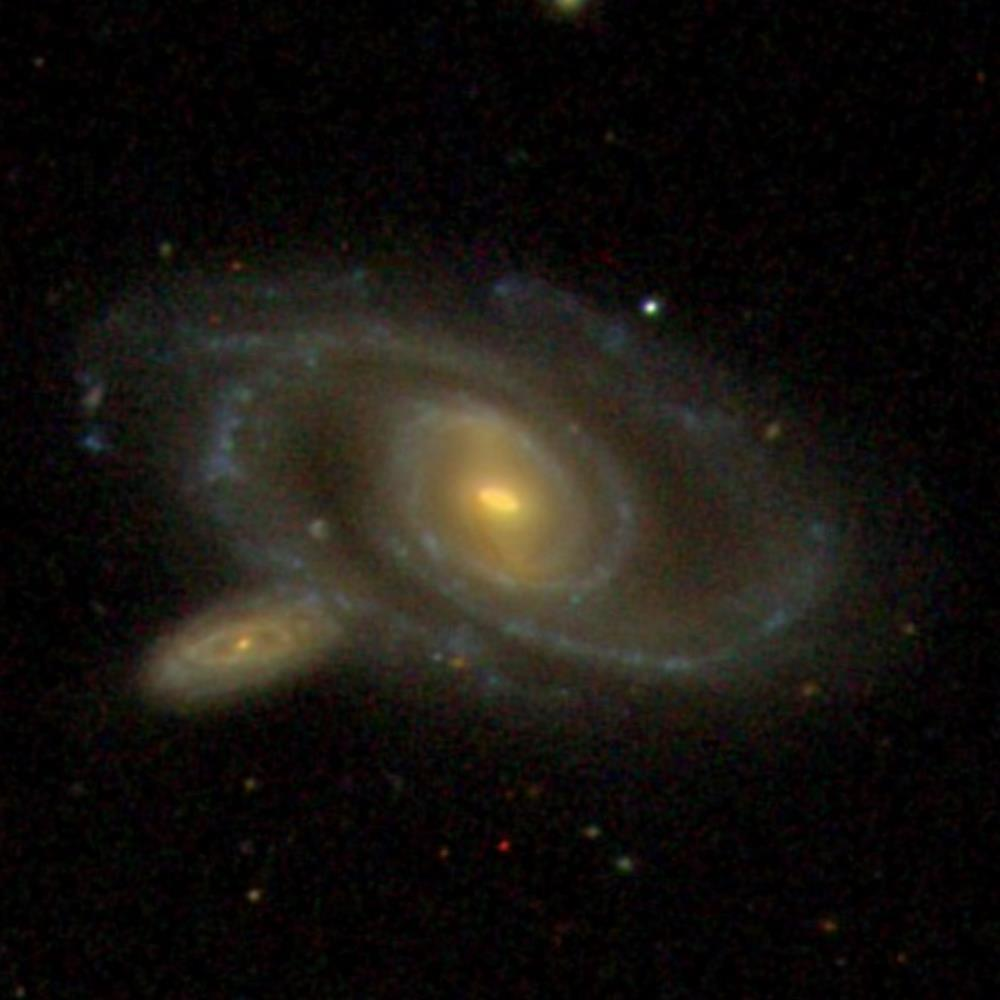
- SDSS image of NGC 3861 and MCG +03-30-094 (galaxy at the lower left).

Observation data (J2000 epoch)
- Constellation: Leo
- Right ascension: 11^{h} 45^{m} 03.8790^{s}
- Declination: 19° 58′ 25.182″
- Redshift: 0.016982
- Heliocentric radial velocity: 5091 km/s
- Distance: 310 Mly (95.1 Mpc)
- Group or cluster: Leo Cluster
- Apparent magnitude (V): 13.7

Characteristics
- Type: (R')SAB(r)b
- Size: ~224,000 ly (68.8 kpc) (estimated)
- Apparent size (V): 2.53 x 0.99

Other designations
- KCPG 299A, IRAS 11424+2015, UGC 6724, MCG 3-30-93, PGC 36604, CGCG 97-129

NGC 3861 is a large barred spiral galaxy with a ring-like structure located about 310 million light-years away in the constellation Leo. It was discovered by astronomer John Herschel on March 23, 1827. NGC 3861 is a member of the Leo Cluster and has a normal amount of neutral hydrogen (H I) and ionised hydrogen (H II).

NGC 3861 is a low luminosity Type II Seyfert galaxy. However, it is also classified as a LINER galaxy.

== Supernovae ==
Two supernovae have been observed in NGC 3861:

- SN 2014aa (Type Ia, mag. 15.7) was discovered by Ron Arbour on March 7, 2014.
- SN 2026ihi (Type II, mag. 18.182) was discovered by ATLAS on April 4, 2026.
