= NGC 2403 =

Galaxy in the constellation Camelopardalis

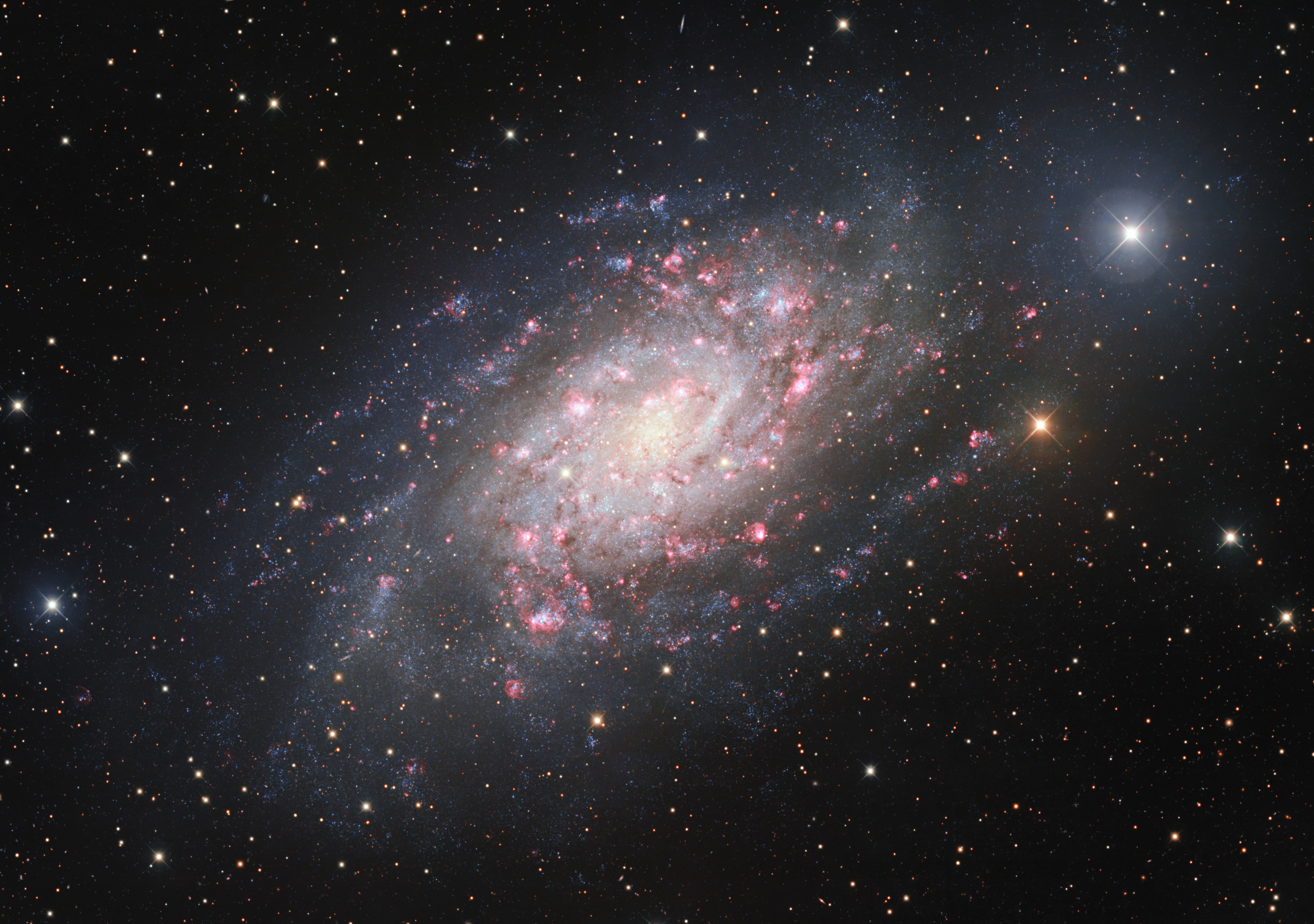
- NGC 2403 imaged by the Nicholas U. Mayall Telescope at the Kitt Peak National Observatory

Observation data (J2000 epoch)
- Constellation: Camelopardalis
- Right ascension: 07^{h} 36^{m} 51.298^{s}
- Declination: +65° 36′ 09.662″
- Redshift: 0.000445
- Heliocentric radial velocity: 133 km/s
- Distance: 9.65 Mly (2.96 Mpc)
- Apparent magnitude (V): 8.2

Characteristics
- Type: SAB(s)cd
- Size: ~90,300 ly (27.69 kpc) (estimated)
- Apparent size (V): 23.4′ × 11.8′

Other designations
- Caldwell 7, IRAS 07321+6543, UGC 3918, PGC 21396, CGCG 309-040

NGC 2403 is an intermediate spiral galaxy in the constellation Camelopardalis. Alternatively, it is known as Caldwell 7. It is an outlying member of the M81 Group of galaxies, and is approximately 9.7 million light-years distant.

== Observation history ==
The galaxy was discovered by German-British astronomer William Herschel on 1 November 1788. Edwin Hubble detected Cepheid variables in NGC 2403 using the Hale Telescope, making it the first galaxy beyond the Local Group within which a Cepheid was discovered. By 1963, 59 variables had been found in NGC 2403, of which 17 were eventually confirmed as Cepheids, with periods between 20 and 87 days. As late as 1950 Hubble was using a distance of just under 2 million light years for the galaxy's distance, but by 1968 the analysis of the Cepheids increased this by almost a factor of five, to within 0.2 magnitudes of the current value.

== Characteristics ==
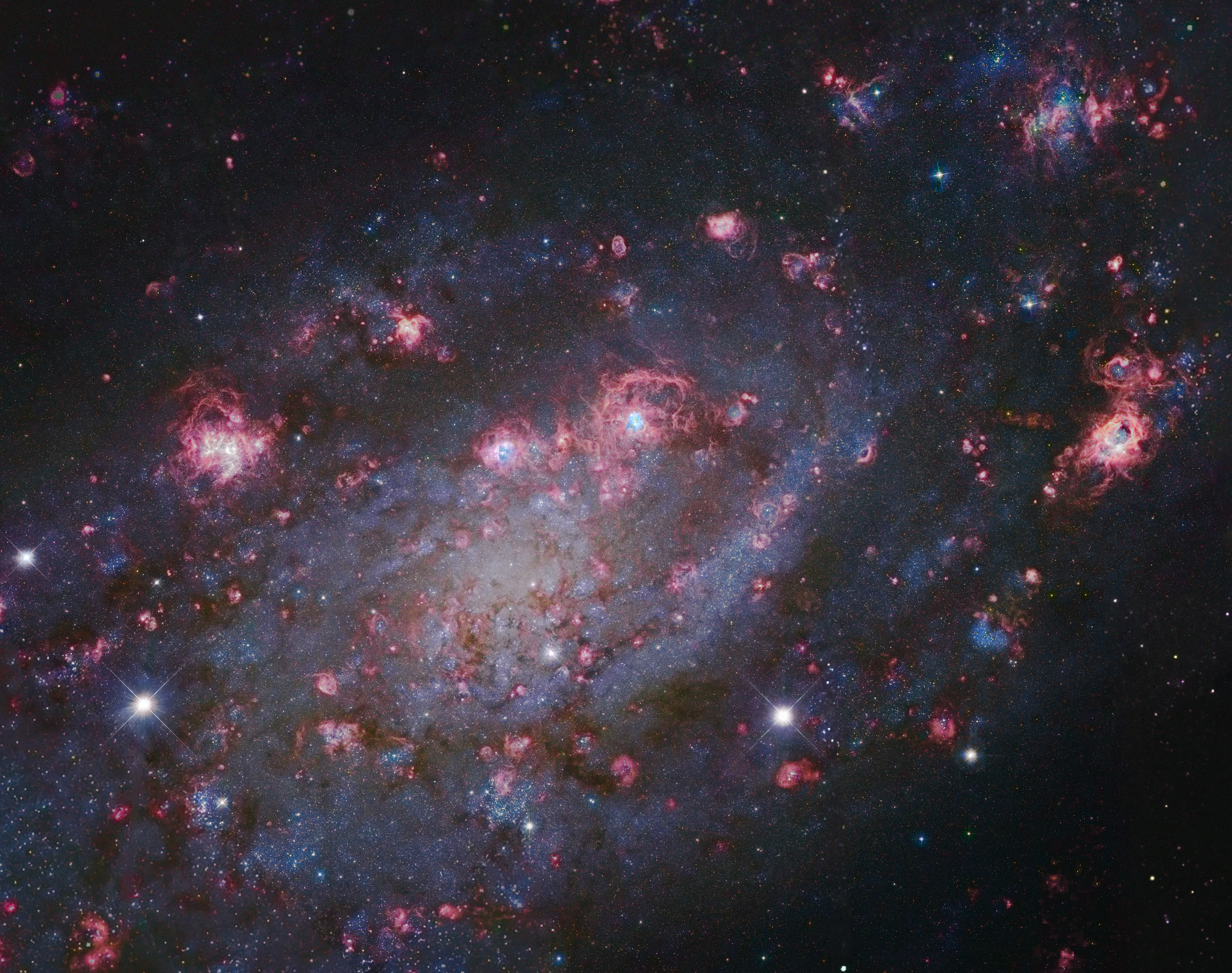
A Hubble Space Telescope (HST), and Subaru image of NGC 2403. NGC 2404 is visible

NGC 2403 bears a similarity to M33, containing numerous star-forming H II regions, but being a little bit larger at approximately 90,000 light-years in diameter compared to the 61,100 light-year diameter of M33. It is a flocculent spiral galaxy, with short, patchy arms. The northern spiral arm connects it to the star forming region NGC 2404. NGC 2403 can be observed using 10×50 binoculars. NGC 2404 is 940 light-years in diameter, making it one of the largest known H II regions. This H II region represents striking similarity with NGC 604 in M33, both in size and location in galaxy.

== Supernovae and supernovae imposters ==
There have been four reported astronomical transients in the galaxy:

- SN 1954J was first noticed by Gustav Tammann and Allan Sandage as a "bright blue irregular variable" star, which they named V12. They noted it underwent a major outburst on 2/3 November 1954, which attained a magnitude of 16 at its brightest. In 1972, Fritz Zwicky classified this event as a Type V supernova. It was later determined to be a supernova imposter: a highly luminous, very massive eruptive star, surrounded by a dusty nebula, similar to the 1843 Great Eruption of η Carinae in the Milky Way.
- SN 2002 kg was discovered by LOTOSS (Lick Observatory and Tenagra Observatory Supernova Searches) on 26 October 2002 and initially classified as a Type IIn, or possibly the outburst of a luminous blue variable. On 24 August 2021, it was reclassified as a Gap transient.
- SN 2004dj (Type II-P, mag. 11.2) was discovered by Kōichi Itagaki on 31 July 2004. At the time of its discovery, it was the nearest and brightest supernova observed in the 21st century, and is now listed as the brightest supernova of 2004.
- AT 2016ccd, initially designated as SNhunt225, is a luminous blue variable, first discovered by Catalina Real-time Transient Survey (CRTS) and Stan Howerton in December 2013. Outbursts from this star have been observed as recently as November 2021.

== Companions ==
NGC 2403 has two known companions. One is the relatively massive dwarf galaxy DDO 44. It is currently being disrupted by NGC 2403, as evidenced by a tidal stream extending 82 kly (25 kpc) on both sides of DDO 44. DDO 44 is approaching NGC 2403 at a distance much closer than typical for dwarf galaxy interactions. It currently has a V-band absolute magnitude of −12.9, but its progenitor was even more luminous.

The other known companion is officially named MADCASH J074238+652501-dw, although it is nicknamed MADCASH-1. The name refers to the MADCASH (Magellanic Analog Dwarf Companions and Stellar Halos) project. MADCASH-1 is similar to typical dwarf spheroidal galaxies in the Local Group; it is quite faint, with an absolute V-band magnitude of −7.81, and has only an ancient, metal-poor population of red giant stars.

== See also ==
- List of NGC objects (2001–3000)
