= SN 1993J =

Supernova in the spiral galaxy Messier 81

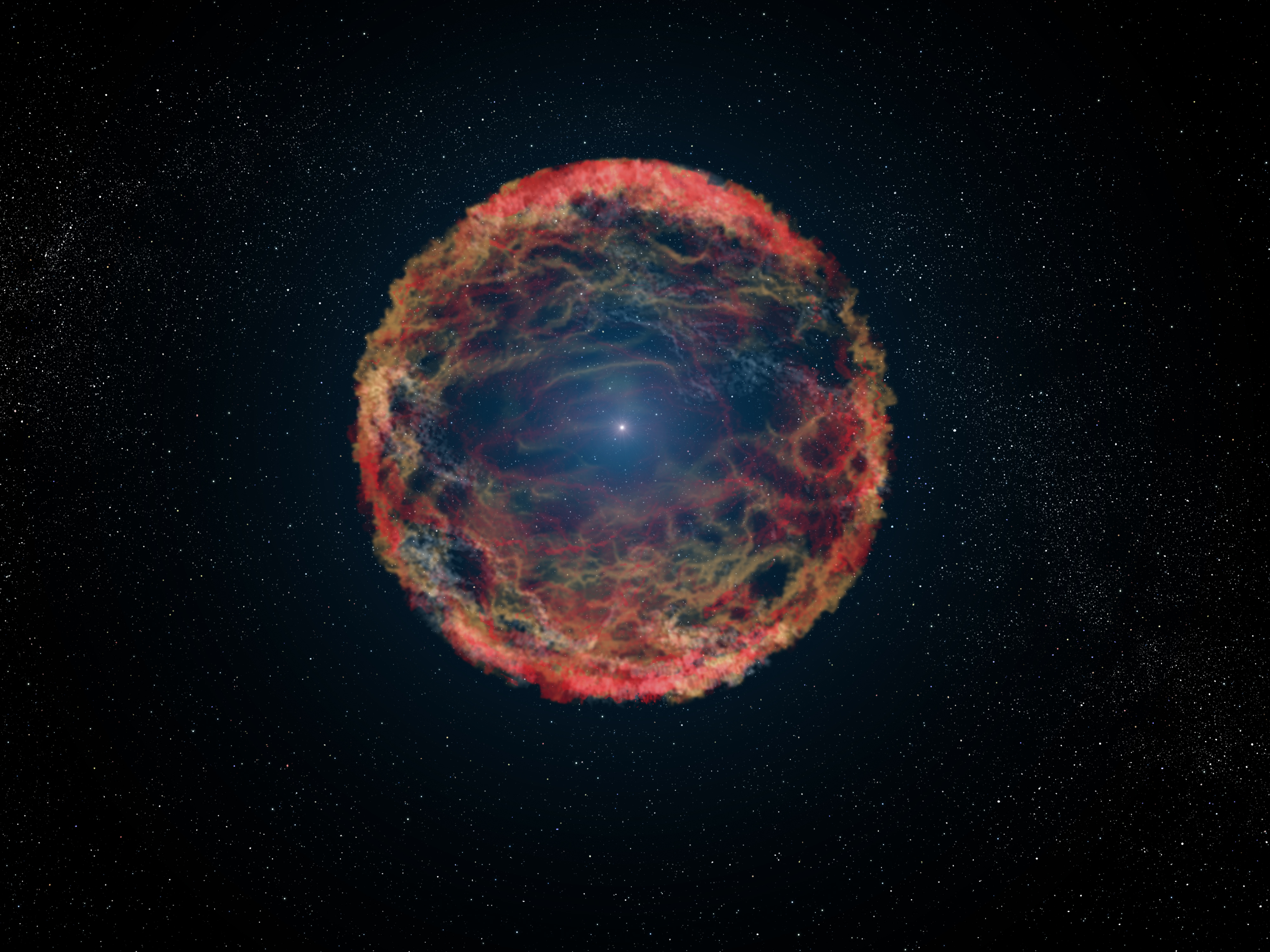
- Artist's impression of supernova 1993J
- Event type: Supernova
- Type IIb
- Date: 28 March 1993 by Francisco Diaz
- Constellation: Ursa Major
- Right ascension: 09^{h} 55^{m} 24.77476^{s}
- Declination: +69° 01′ 13.7026″
- Epoch: J2000
- Distance: 11.8 million ly
- Host: Bode's Galaxy
- Peak apparent magnitude: +10.7
- Other designations: SN 1993J, AAVSO 0947+69, ICRF J095524.7+690113, INTREF 395, PBC J0955.1+6904
- Related media on Commons

SN 1993J was a supernova in Bode's Galaxy. It was discovered on 28 March 1993 by amateur astronomer Francisco Garcia Diaz in Lugo, Spain. At the time, it was the second-brightest Type II supernova observed in the 20th century behind SN 1987A, peaking at a visible apparent magnitude of 10.7 on 30 March, with a second peak of 10.86 on 18 April.

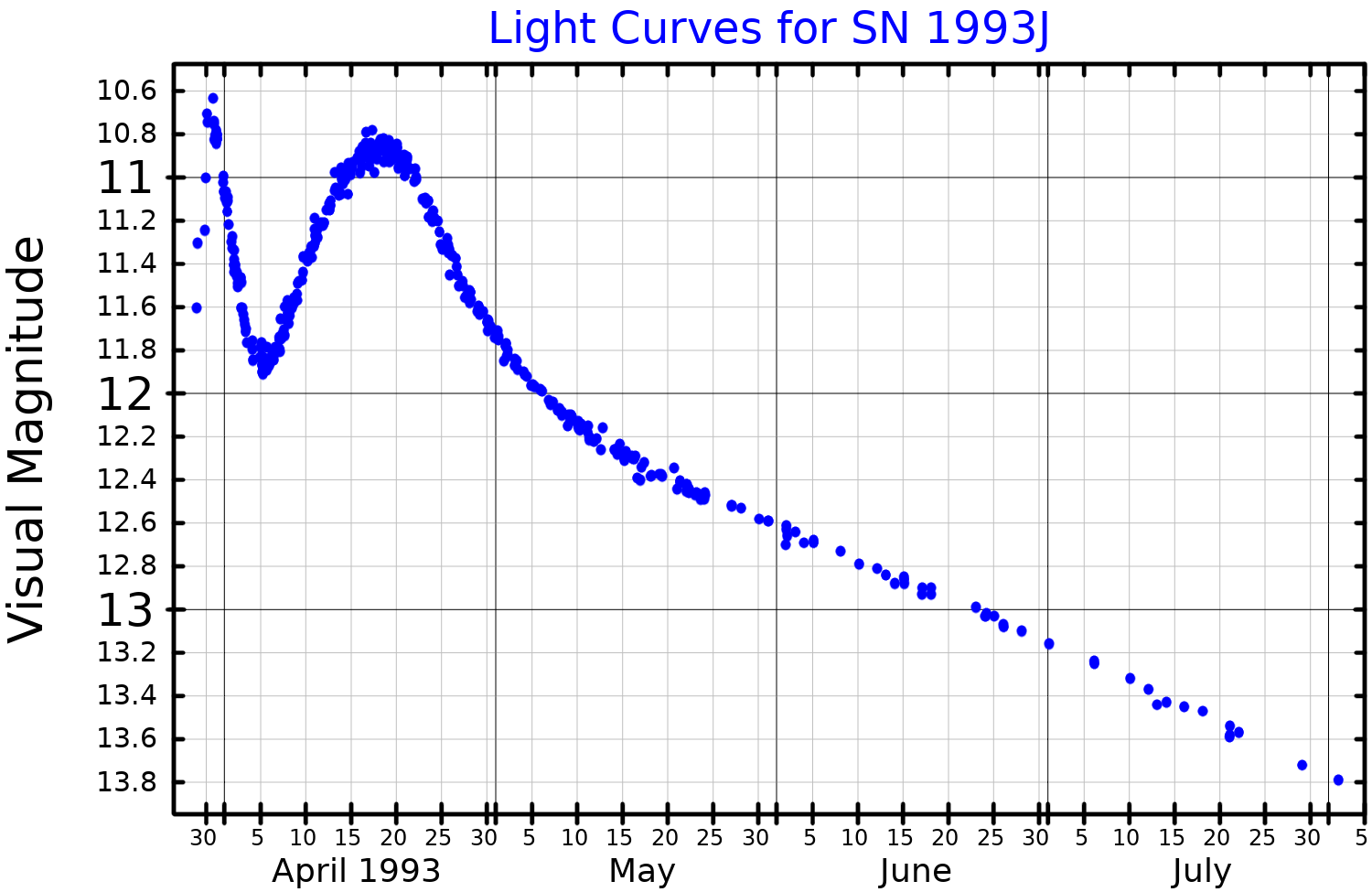
A visual band light curve for SN 1993J, adapted from Wheeler et al. and Benson et al.

The spectral characteristics of the supernova changed over time. Initially, it looked more like a Type II supernova (a supernova formed by the explosion of a giant star) with strong hydrogen spectral line emission, but later the hydrogen lines faded and strong helium spectral lines appeared, making the supernova look more like a Type Ib. Moreover, the variations in SN 1993J's luminosity over time were not like the variations observed in other Type II supernovae but did resemble the variations observed in Type Ib supernovae. Hence, the supernova has been classified as a Type IIb supernova, an intermediate class between Type II and Type Ib. The scientific results from this supernova suggested that Type Ib and Ic supernovae were actually formed through the explosions of giant stars through processes similar to what takes place in Type II supernovae. The supernova was also used to estimate a distance of 8.5 ± 1.3 Mly (2.6 ± 0.4 Mpc) to Bode's Galaxy.

Light echoes from the explosion have subsequently been detected.

The progenitor of SN 1993J was identified in pre-explosion ground-based images. The progenitor was observed to be a K-type supergiant star, with an excess in the ultraviolet possibly due to surrounding hot stars or a hot binary companion. While the supernova is located in a region populated by young massive stars, late-time photometry with the Hubble Space Telescope and spectroscopy with the Keck 10m-telescope presented by Maund and collaborators revealed the presence of the long-suspected B-supergiant companion star.
