= SN 2004dj =

July 2004 supernova event in the constellation Camelopardalis

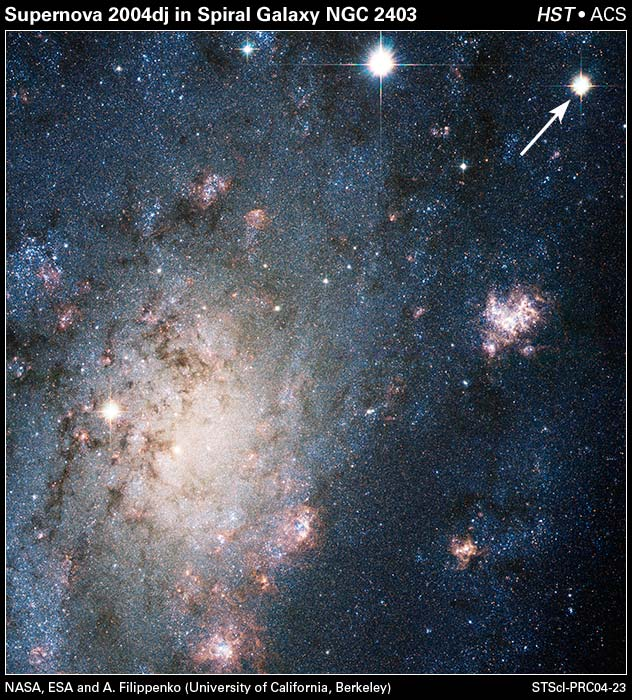
- Event type: Supernova, high-mass X-ray binary
- II-P
- Date: 31 July 2004 18:15 UTC
- Constellation: Camelopardalis
- Right ascension: 07^{h} 37^{m} 17.044^{s}
- Declination: +65° 35′ 57.84″
- Epoch: J2000.0
- Galactic coordinates: ?
- Distance: about 11,000,000 light-years
- Remnant: Nebula
- Host: NGC 2403
- Progenitor: Unknown star in compact cluster Sandage 96
- Progenitor type: Supergiant
- Colour (B-V): Unknown
- Notable features: Light Curves
- Peak apparent magnitude: +11.2
- Other designations: SN 2004dj, CXOU J073717.1+653557, CXO J073717.0+653557
- Related media on Commons

SN 2004dj was the brightest supernova since SN 1987A at the time of its discovery.

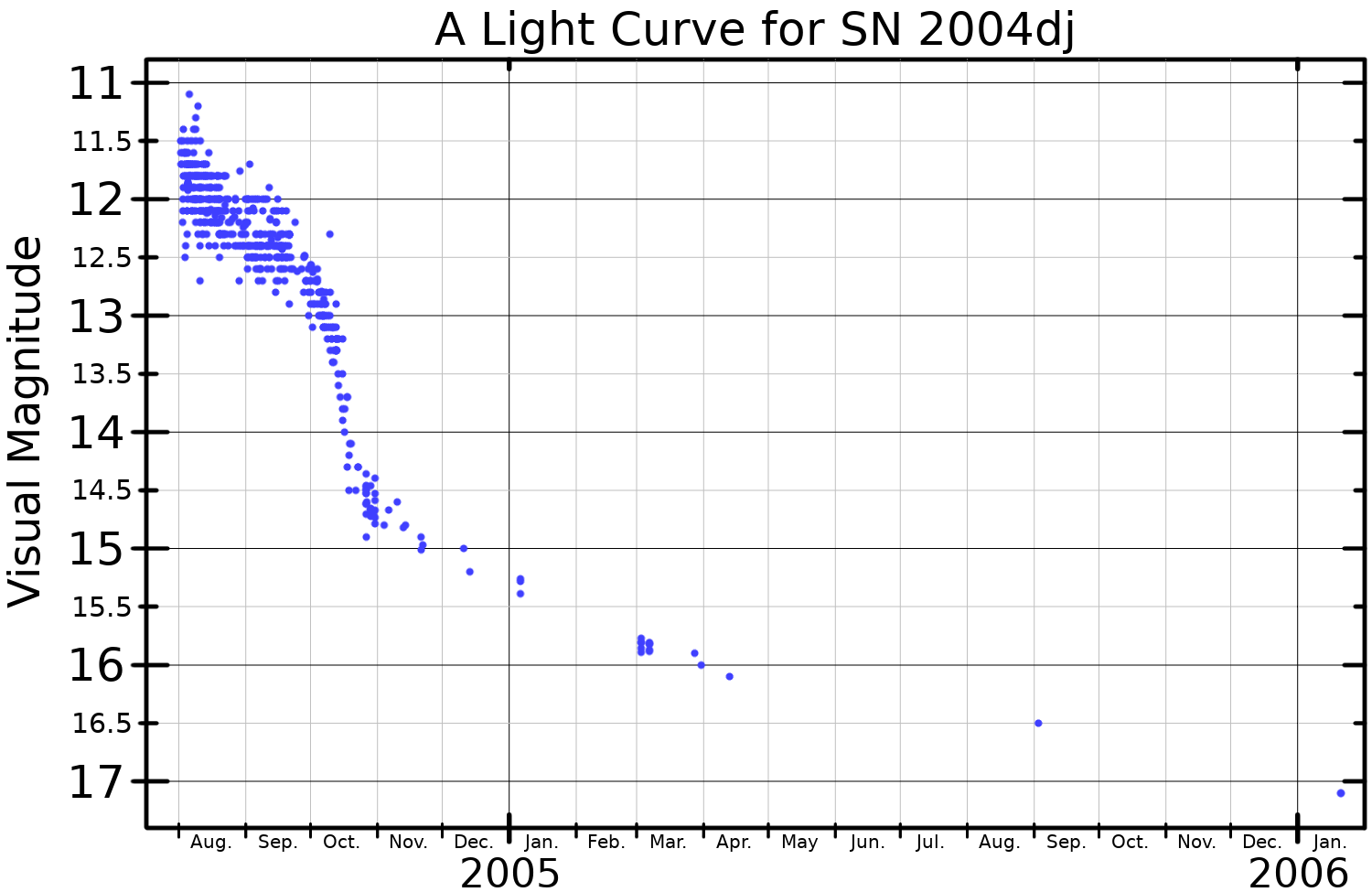
A light curve for SN 2004dj, plotted from AAVSO data

This Type II-P supernova was discovered by Japanese astronomer Kōichi Itagaki on 31 July 2004. At the time of its discovery, its apparent brightness was 11.2 visual magnitude; the discovery occurred after the supernova had reached its peak magnitude. The supernova's progenitor is a star in a young, compact star cluster in the galaxy NGC 2403, in Camelopardalis. The cluster had been cataloged as the 96th object in a list of luminous stars and clusters by Allan Sandage in 1984; the progenitor is therefore commonly referred to as Sandage 96. This cluster is easily visible in a Kitt Peak National Observatory image and appears starlike.
