= SN 2213−1745 =

Supernova event in the constellation of Aquarius

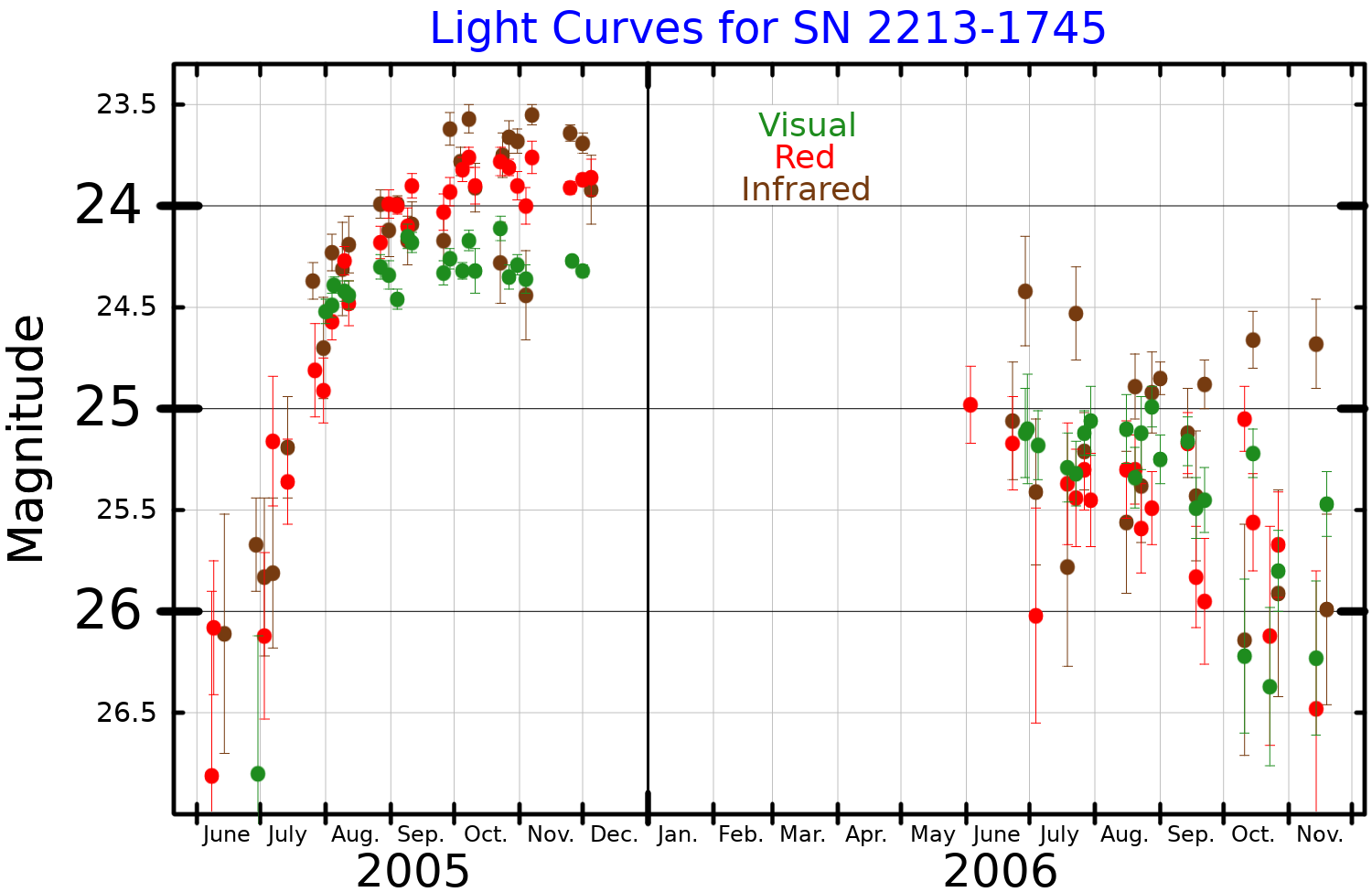
- Light curves for SN 2213-45 in three photometric bands, plotted from data published by Cooke et al. (2012)
- Event type: Supernova
- SLSN-R
- Date: Supernova Legacy Survey
- Constellation: Aquarius
- Right ascension: 22^{h} 13^{m} 39.970^{s}
- Declination: −17° 45′ 24.49″
- Epoch: J2000.0
- Distance: z=2.0458±0.0005
- Redshift: 2.0458 ±0.0005
- Progenitor: ~250 M_{☉} star
- Other designations: SN J2213−1745

SN 2213−1745 was an extremely remote superluminous supernova (SLSN), which occurred in between November 2004 and June 2005. It was discovered in Canada-France-Hawaii Telescope Legacy Survey data. Its peak far-ultraviolet absolute magnitude reached −21.2, which was comparable to the total absolute magnitude of its host galaxy. The distance (redshift) to this supernova z=2.0458±0.0005 makes it one of the most remote supernovae observed as of 2012. The luminosity of SN 2213−1745 evolved slowly over several years as it was still detectable in November 2006. Both the high luminosity and slow decay indicate that the supernova's progenitor was a star with an initial mass as high as 250 solar masses. The supernova explosion itself may have been a pair-instability supernova similar to the SN 2007bi event, with which it shares many similarities.

Observations of SN 2213−1745 imply that more than 3 solar masses of radioactive ^{56}Ni may have been released by the star's explosion.
