= List of most distant supernovae =

List of most distant supernovae is a list of supernovae.

== Most distant supernovae ==
This list contains selected examples of supernovae so far discovered.

Most distant
Name	Distance	Type	Notes
SN 1000+0216	z=3.8993	Superluminous supernova	
DES16C2nm	z=2.0		Spectroscopically confirmed distance
SN UDS10Wil (SN Wilson)	z=1.914	Type Ia supernova	
SN SCP-0401 (Mingus)	z=1.71	Type Ia supernova	First observed in 2004, it was not until 2013 that it could be identified as a Type-Ia SN.
SN 1997ff	z=1.7	Type Ia supernova	Its distance was determined in 2001, was the most distant supernova at that time.
Supernova Primo	z=1.55	Type Ia supernova	

== List of most distant supernova by type ==
Most distant supernova by type
Type	Name	Distance	Date	Notes
Supernova, any type	SN 1000+0216	z=3.8993	2012	
Supernova, any type, spectroscopically confirmed	DES16C2nm	z=2.0	2018	Discovered in 2016, spectroscopically observed in 2017, analysis confirmed in 2018
Type Ia supernova	SN UDS10Wil (SN Wilson)	z=1.914	2013	Named after U.S. President Woodrow Wilson, from its codename fragment "Will"
Type Ib supernova				
Type Ic supernova				
Type I supernova, any subclass	SN Wilson (SN UDS10Wil)	z=1.914	2013	This is a Type Ia supernova
Type II-P supernova				
Type II-L supernova				
Type IIb supernova				
Type IIn supernova				
Type II supernova, any subclass				
Type III supernova				
Superluminous supernova (SLSN), any type				
Superluminous supernova type 1 (SLSN-I), any subclass				
Superluminous supernova type 1c (SLSN-Ic)				
Superluminous supernova type 2 (SLSN-II)				

== Timeline of most distant supernova recordholders ==
This is a successive list of supernovae that were known at one time as the most distant supernova ever.

Most distant supernova titleholders
Name	Distance	Date	Notes
SN 1000+0216	z=3.8993	2012—	
SN 19941 [CFHTLS.SNLS]	z=2.357	2009—	A Type IIn supernova discovered from legacy survey data of the Canada-France-Hawaii Telescope in 2009. One of three supernovae discovered in the archive search.
SN 1997ff	z=1.71	2001—	A Type Ia supernova, discovered in 1997, its distance was determined in 2001.
SN 1988U	z=0.31	1988–	Located in the galaxy cluster AC118

== See also ==
- List of largest cosmic structures
- List of the most distant astronomical objects
- List of most distant stars
- List of supernovae
