= SN 1000+0216 =

Supernova in the constellation Sextans

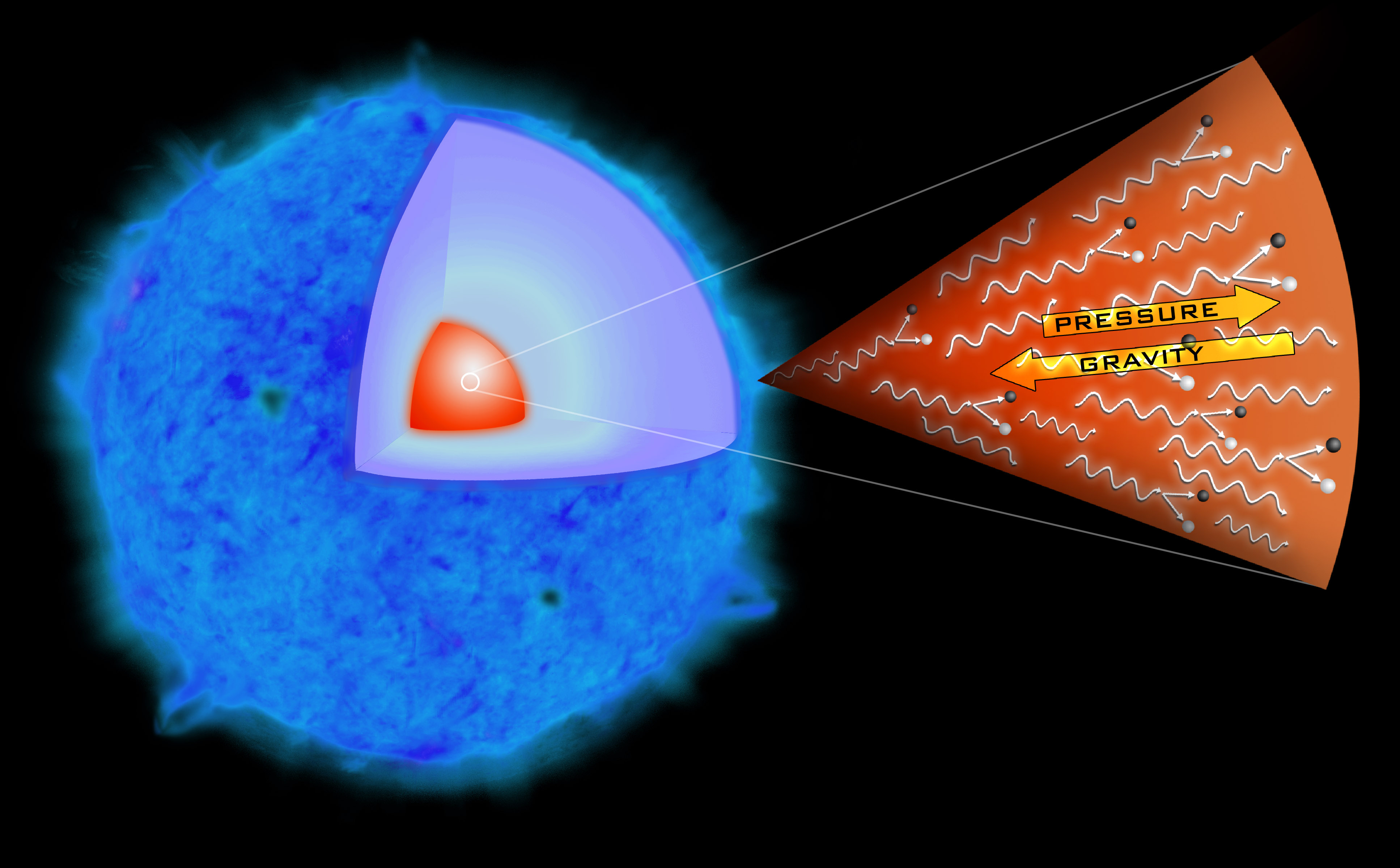
- The pair instability process that triggered the explosion in SN 1000+0216
- Event type: Superluminous supernova
- SLSN-R or SLSN-II ?
- Date: Supernova Legacy Survey
- Constellation: Sextans
- Right ascension: 10^{h} 00^{m} 05.8720^{s}
- Declination: +02° 16′ 23.621″
- Epoch: J2000.0
- Distance: z=3.8993 ± 0.0074
- Redshift: 3.8993 ±0.0074
- Progenitor: initially a 140–250 M_{☉} star

SN 1000+0216 was an extremely remote hypernova or superluminous supernova (SLSN), which occurred in between June and November 2006 in the constellation Sextans. Its peak far-ultraviolet absolute magnitude reached −21.5, which exceeded the total absolute magnitude of its host galaxy. The distance (redshift) to this supernova z=3.8993 ± 0.0074 makes it the most distant supernova observed as of 2012.

The luminosity of SN 1000+0216 evolved slowly over several years as it was still detectable in November 2008. Both the high luminosity and slow decay indicate that the supernova's progenitor was a very massive star. The supernova explosion itself was likely either a pair-instability supernova or a pulsational pair-instability supernova similar to the SN 2007bi event. It also had some similarities to the low redshift SN 2006gy supernova. Overall classification of SN 1000+0216 remains uncertain.
