= NGC 3191 =

Galaxy in the constellation Ursa Major

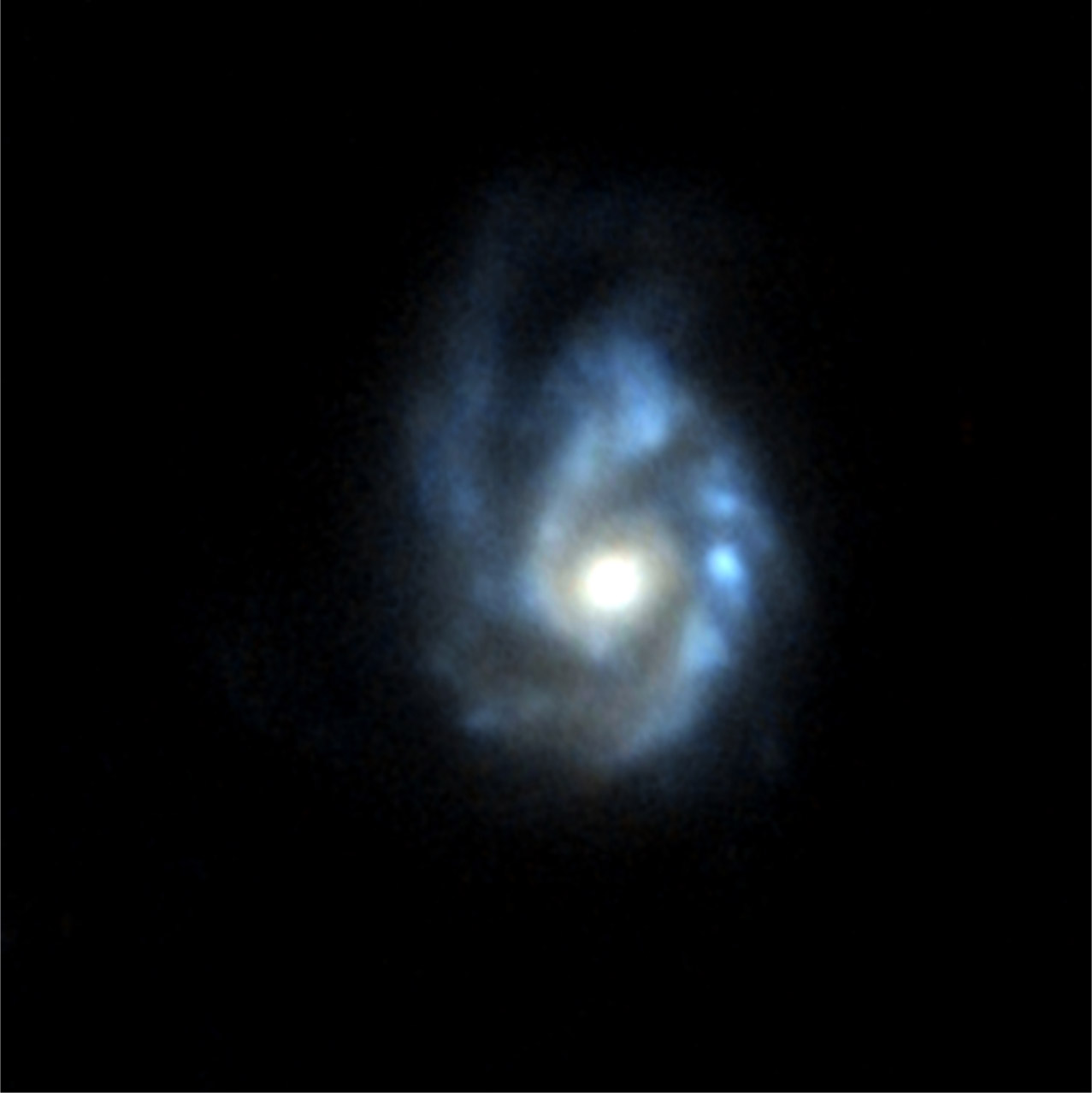
- Composite image of NGC 3191 imaged by SDSS and Pan-STARRS

Observation data (J2000 epoch)
- Constellation: Ursa Major
- Right ascension: 10^{h} 19^{m} 05.1^{s}
- Declination: 46° 27′ 15″
- Redshift: 9182 ± 4 km/s
- Distance: 411 Mly (126 Mpc)
- Apparent magnitude (V): 13.2

Characteristics
- Type: SB(s)bc pec
- Apparent size (V): 0.8′ × 0.6′

Other designations
- NGC 3192, UGC 5565, MCG +08-19-018, PGC 30136

NGC 3191 (also known as NGC 3192) is a barred spiral galaxy in the constellation Ursa Major. It was discovered on 5 February 1788 by William Herschel. It is located at a distance of about 400 million light years from Earth, which, given its apparent dimensions, means that NGC 3191 is about 115,000 light years across.

The galaxy has been distorted and interacts with a companion about 0.5 arcminutes to the west, a galaxy identified as KUG 1015+467. An extremely blue tidal bridge lies between them. It was discovered by Gaia on 23 May 2017.

== Supernovae ==
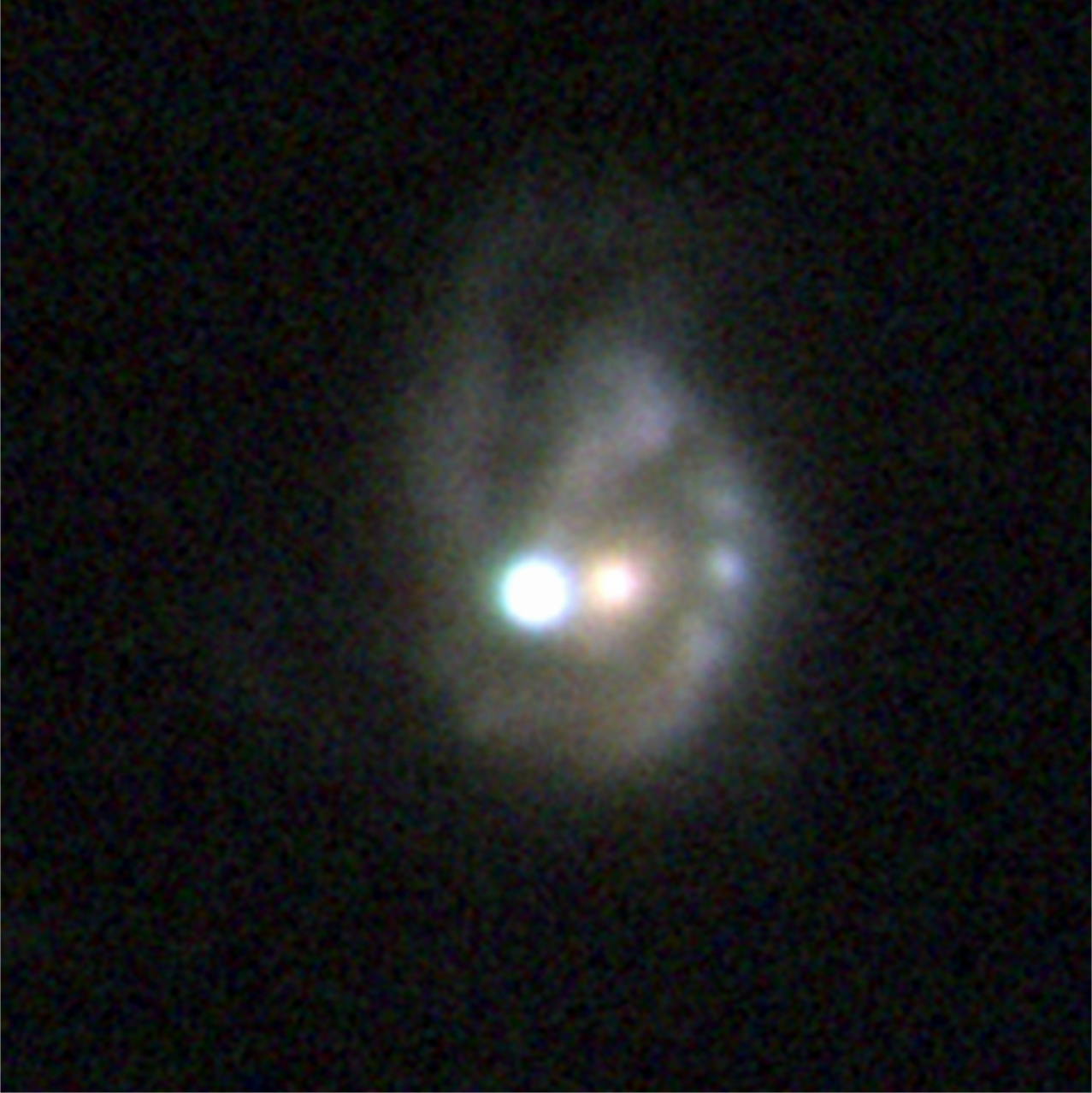
SN 2017egm imaged by the Nordic Optical Telescope

Three supernovae have been observed in NGC 3191:

- SN 1988B (Type Ia, mag. 15.5) was discovered by Paul Wild on 18 January 1988, 10" north of the galaxy's center.
- PTF10bgl (Type II-P, mag. unknown) was discovered by the Palomar Transient Factory on 6 February 2010.
- SN 2017egm (Type SLSN-I, mag. 16.72) was identified as a Type I superluminous supernova. It is the closest supernova of this type observed and also the first to be found in a massive spiral galaxy.

== See also ==
- List of NGC objects (3001–4000)
