= SN 2016aps =

February 2016 supernova in the constellation Draco

SN2016aps
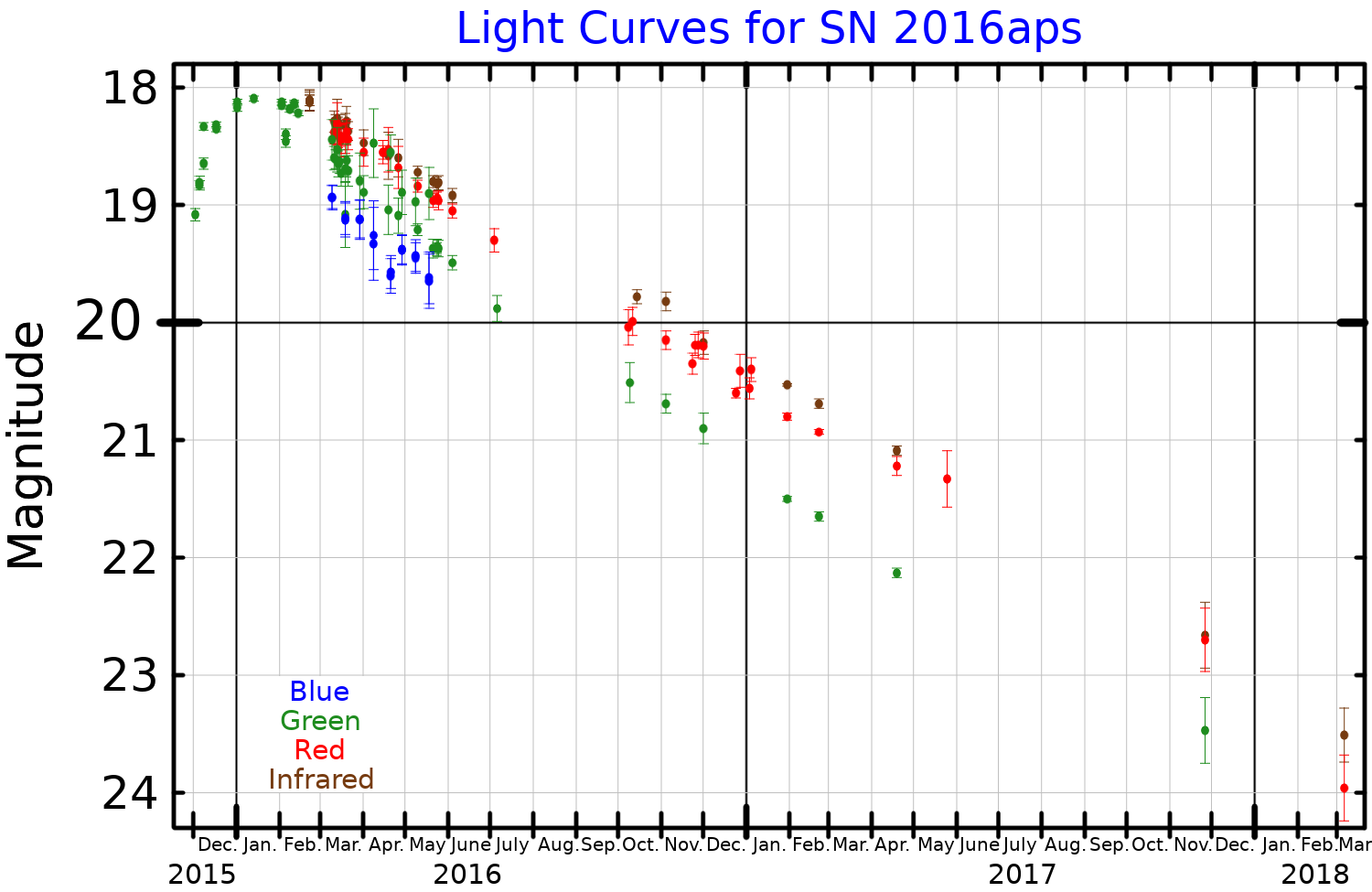
- Light curves for SN 2016aps in four photometric bands, plotted from Open Supernova Catalog data
- Event type: Supernova
- Type II?
- Constellation: Draco
- Right ascension: 10^{h} 19^{m} 02.17^{s}
- Declination: +74° 42′ 24.6″
- Epoch: J2000

SN 2016aps (also known as PS16aqy and AT2016aps) is the brightest and most energetic supernova explosion ever recorded. It released more energy than ASASSN-15lh. In addition to the sheer amount of energy released, an unusually large amount of the energy was released in the form of radiation, probably due to the interaction of the supernova ejecta and a previously lost gas shell.

== Overview ==
The event was discovered on 22 February 2016 by the Panoramic Survey Telescope and Rapid Response System (Pan-STARRS) in Hawaii, with follow-up observations by the Hubble Space Telescope. The supernova occurred at a high z-value indicating a distance of 3.6 billion light-years. and is located in the constellation Draco. The maximum apparent magnitude was 18.11, the corresponding absolute magnitude −22.35.

The progenitor star is estimated to have had at least 50 to 100 solar masses. The spectrum of SN 2016aps revealed significant amounts of hydrogen, which is unexpected for supernovae of this type, which usually occur after nuclear fusion has consumed most of the star's hydrogen and the stars have shed the remaining hydrogen atmosphere. This led researchers to the theory that the progenitor star formed only shortly before the event from the merger of two very large stars, creating a "pulsational pair instability" supernova or possibly a full pair instability supernova.

== See also ==
- Superluminous supernova – Supernova at least ten times more luminous than a standard supernova
