= SN 2017egm =

Superluminous supernova in galaxy NGC 3191

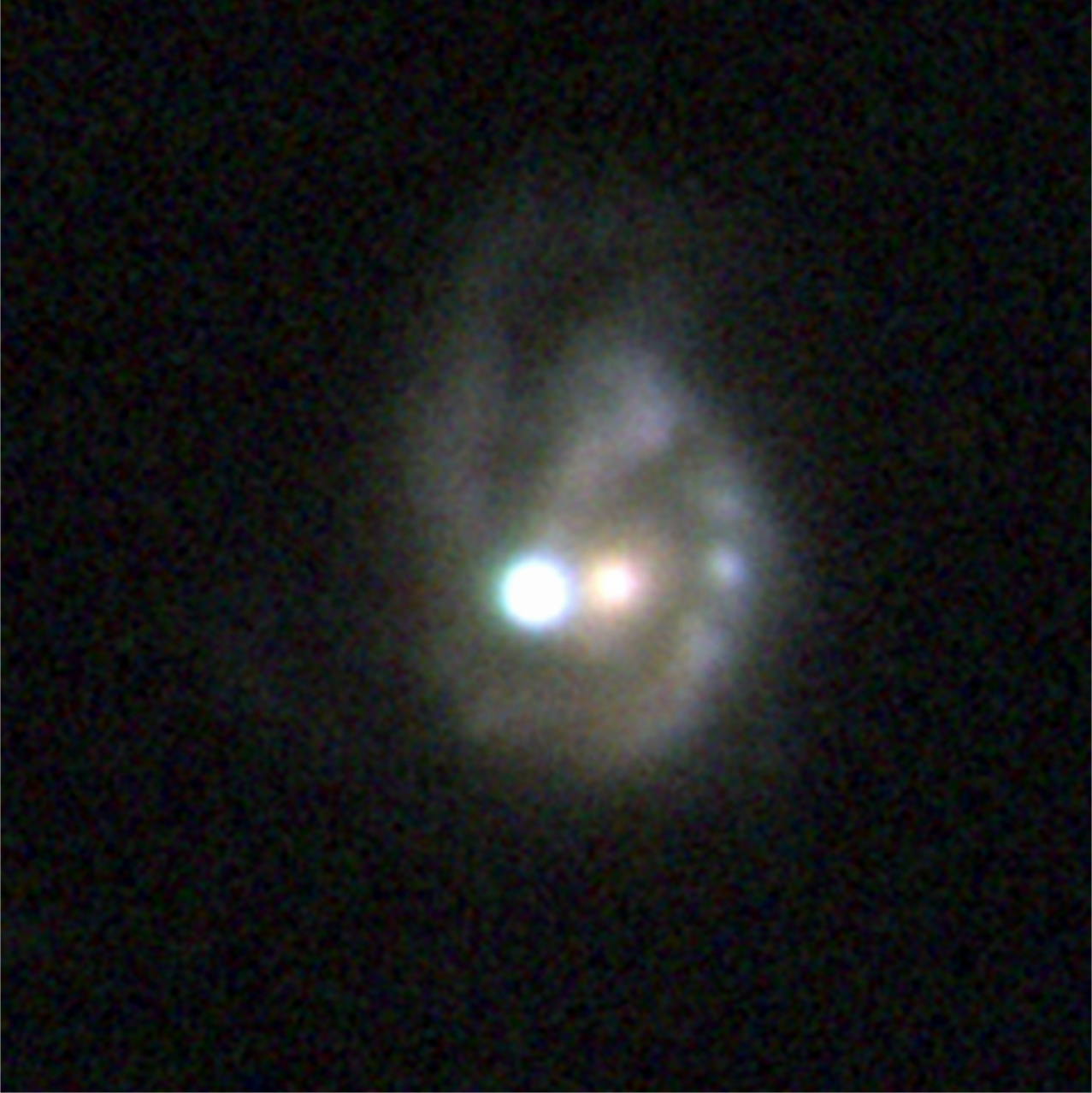
- SN 2017egm imaged by the Nordic Optical Telescope
- Event type: Superluminous supernova
- SLSN-I
- Date: 23 May 2017; 08:27:12
- Instrument: Gaia
- Constellation: Ursa Major
- Right ascension: 10^{h} 19^{m} 5.62^{s}
- Declination: +46° 27′ 14.1″
- Epoch: J2000
- Distance: 411 Mly (126 Mpc)
- Redshift: 0.030721
- Host: NGC 3191
- Peak apparent magnitude: +16.72
- Other designations: SN 2017egm, Gaia17biu, iPTF17egm, PS18cn
- Related media on Commons

SN 2017egm (also known as Gaia17biu) is a hydrogen-poor superluminous supernova (SLSN-I) discovered in 2017. It is notable as the closest known SLSN-I at the time of discovery, occurring in the massive spiral galaxy NGC 3191.

== Discovery ==
SN 2017egm was discovered on 23 May 2017 by the Gaia telescope at an apparent magnitude of 16.72 in the G-Gaia filter. Spectroscopic observations shortly after discovery classified it as a Type I superluminous supernova (SLSN-I). Later studies identified helium features, including strong He Iλ10830 emission and four He I absorption lines, thus reclassifying it within an emerging population of helium-rich SLSNe-I (SLSNe-Ib).

== Observation ==
SN 2017egm exhibits one of the most complex light curves among SLSNe-I. It shows a nearly linear rise to maximum followed by multiple post-peak bumps between 100–350 days after peak. The light curve with multiple post-peak bumps indicates strong indications of interaction with circumstellar material (CSM) and thus may have formed a pulsational pair-instability progenitor two years before the explosion.

== Gallery ==
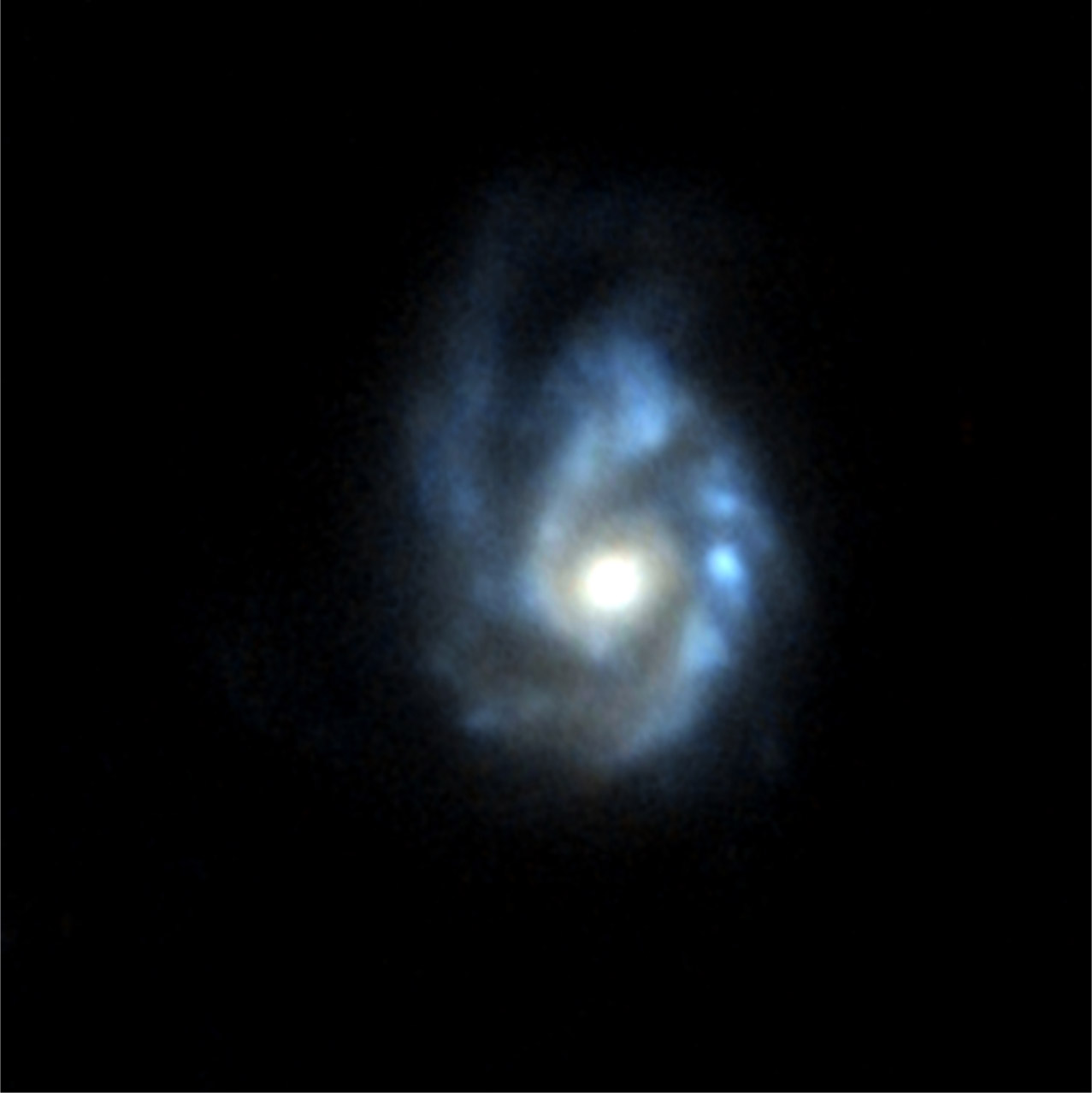
Composite image of NGC 3191 imaged by SDSS and Pan-STARRS

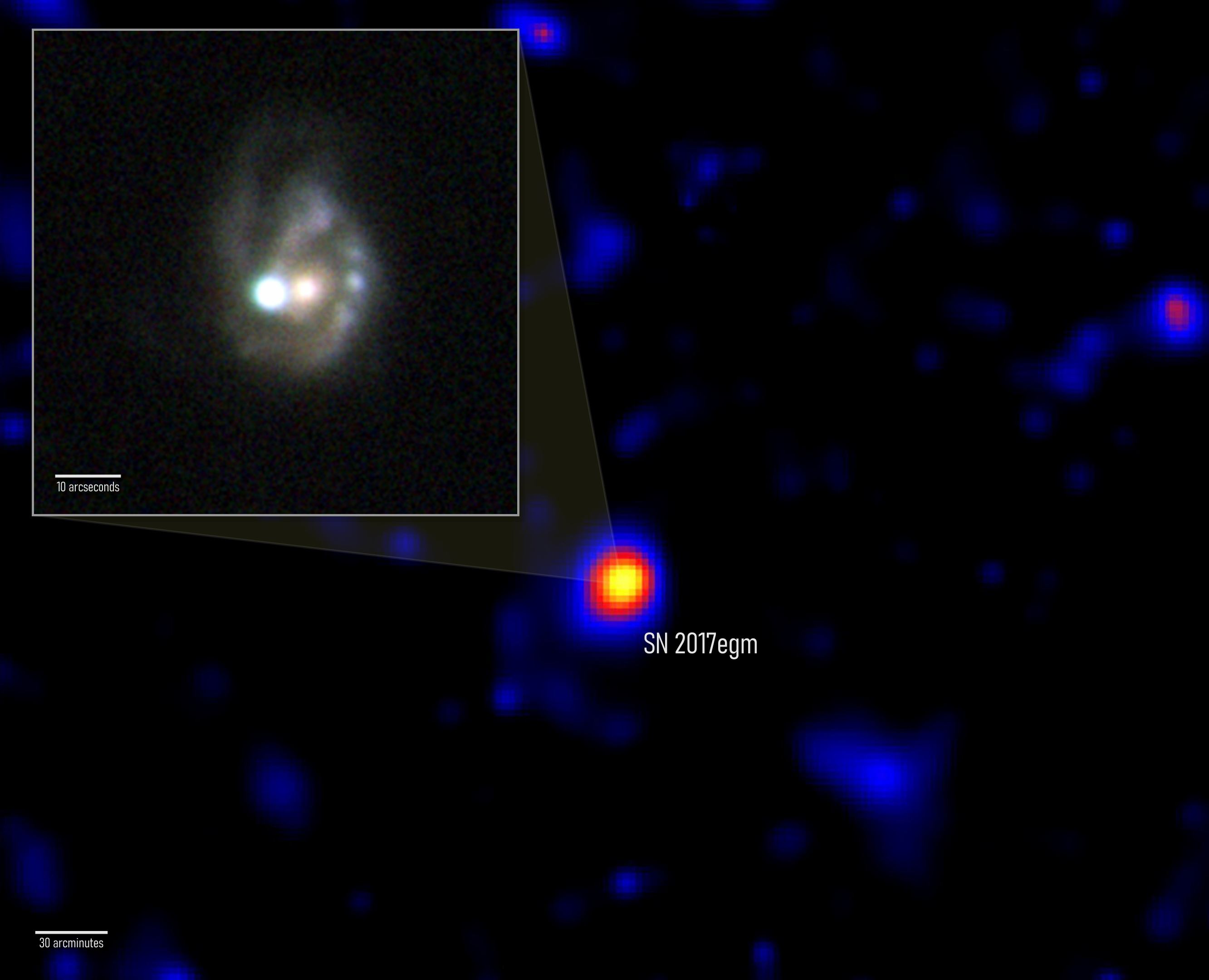
Composite image of SN 2017egm imaged by Fermi Gamma-ray Space Telescope and Nordic Optical Telescope
