= Vanina Ruhlmann-Kleider =

French physicist (born 1961)

Vanina Ruhlmann-Kleider (born 1961) is a French physicist and director of research for the French National Centre for Scientific Research (CNRS), at CEA Paris-Saclay. Originally working in experimental particle physics, her interests shifted to observational cosmology through her participation in the Supernova Legacy Survey and Baryon Oscillation Spectroscopic Survey projects.

== Education and career ==
Ruhlmann-Kleider earned a diplôme d'études approfondies in nuclear and particle physics through her studies at the École normale supérieure de jeunes filles, and in 1988 completed a doctorate through the University of Paris, for research at CEA Paris-Saclay, with the dissertation Measurement of the strong running coupling constant from W and Z production (UA2 experiment) directed by André Roussarie. In the same year, she became a permanent researcher at CEA Paris-Saclay.

Until 2008, her research included experimental high-energy physics at CERN, including the search for the Higgs Boson. She began work on the Supernova Legacy Survey in 2006, and since then has continued her research in observational cosmology. More recently, her work on the Baryon Oscillation Spectroscopic Survey has led to new insights into dark energy. She is one of the group leaders of the SPP Cosmology group in the CEA Institute of research into the fundamental laws of the universe (IRFU).

== Recognition ==
Ruhlmann-Kleider received the Ordre des Palmes académiques in 2002, and the CNRS Silver Medal in 2003. She was named a chevalier in the Legion of Honour in 2010.
