= SN 2018cow =

Supernova event of June 2018 in the constellation Hercules

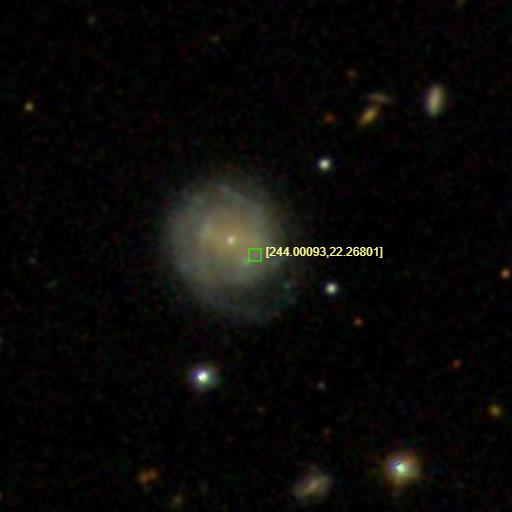
- Location of SN 2018cow; image taken by SDSS
- Event type: Astronomical explosion
- SN Ib
- Date: 16 June 2018, 10:35:02 UTC
- Instrument: ATLAS-HKO
- Constellation: Hercules
- Right ascension: 16^{h} 16^{m} 00.2242^{s} 16^{h} 16^{m} 00.22^{s} (244.000927647)
- Declination: +22° 16′ 04.890″ +22° 16′ 04.83″ (+22.2680094118)
- Epoch: J2000.0
- Distance: 200 Mly (60 Mpc)
- Redshift: 0.014145, 0.0136 (0.01406/parent galaxy)
- Other designations: 18abcfcoo, 18actuhrs, SN 2018cow, ATLAS 18qqn, AT 2018cow
- Website: atlas.fallingstar.com
- Related media on Commons

SN 2018cow (ATLAS name: ATLAS18qqn; also known as Supernova 2018cow, AT 2018cow (AT = Astronomical Transient), and "The Cow") was a very powerful astronomical explosion 10–100 times brighter than a normal supernova, spatially coincident with galaxy CGCG 137-068, approximately 200 million ly (60 million pc) distant in the constellation Hercules. It was discovered on 16 June 2018 by the ATLAS-HKO telescope, and had generated significant interest among astronomers throughout the world. Later, on 10 July 2018, and after AT 2018cow had significantly faded, astronomers, based on follow-up studies with the Nordic Optical Telescope (NOT), formally described AT 2018cow as SN 2018cow, a Type Ib supernova, showing an "unprecedented spectrum for a supernova of this class"; although others, mostly at first but also more recently, have referred to it as a Type Ic-BL supernova. An explanation to help better understand the unique features of AT 2018cow has been presented. AT2018cow is one of the few reported Fast Blue Optical Transients (FBOTs) observed in the Universe. In May 2020, however, a much more powerful FBOT than AT 2018cow (namely, CRTS-CSS161010 J045834-081803, or CSS161010 for short) was reportedly observed.

On 2 November 2018, two independent teams of astronomers both concluded that the AT 2018cow event was "either a newly formed black hole in the process of accreting matter, or the frenetic rotation of a neutron star."

In January 2019, astronomers proposed that the explosion may have been a white dwarf being pulled apart by a black hole; or a supernova leaving behind a black hole or a neutron star, the creation of a compact body being observed for the first time. On 13 December 2021, astronomers reported that AT 2018cow, an extreme FBOT, "could be a neutron star or black hole with a mass less than 850 solar masses" based on high-time-resolution X-ray observation studies.

== History ==
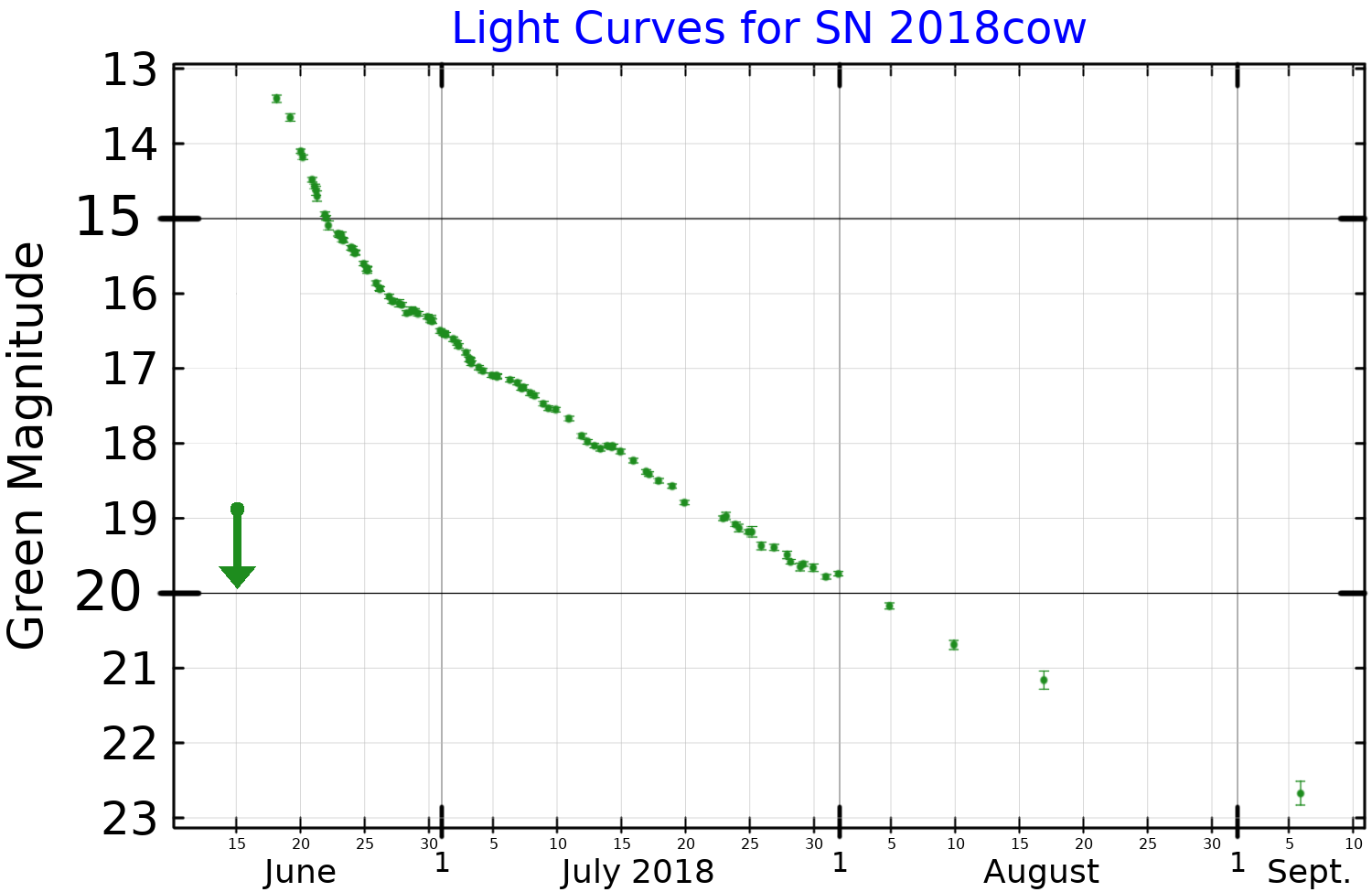
A light curve for SN 2018cow, plotted from data published by Perley et al. (2019). The arrow shows a pre-eruption upper limit.

AT 2018cow was discovered on 16 June 2018 at 10:35:02 UTC by the ATLAS-HKO telescope, a twin 0.5 m (20 in) system, at the Haleakala Observatory in Hawaii. It was a powerful astronomical explosion (discovery magnitude 14.739; redshift 0.014145, 0.0136), 10 – 100 times brighter than a normal supernova, spatially coincident with galaxy CGCG 137-068, approximately 200 million ly (60 million pc) distant in the Hercules constellation.

By 22 June 2018, this transient astronomical event had generated significant interest among astronomers throughout the world. At least 24 major telescopes were observing the event, the largest number, as of 27 June 2018, of concurrent observations (over 35 posted on 27 June 2018) of any astronomical event ever reported on The Astronomer's Telegram. The event had been tentatively identified as a supernova and given the designation Supernova 2018cow and classification SN Ic-BL.

The first X-ray and ultraviolet (UV) observations of AT 2018cow were obtained on 19 June 2018 with the Swift telescope. These observations revealed that the object was a bright X-ray/UV transient, with an X-ray luminosity of ~1×10^{43} erg/s and a UV brightness of about 11.7 (Vega mag) in the range 1600-3600 Å. On 25 June 2018, astronomers, using the 2.0 m (79 in) Liverpool Telescope and the 1.5 m (59 in) telescope at Palomar Observatory, noted on The Astronomer's Telegram: "AT2018cow has faded every night since our first observations [19 June 2018]. ... [The reported] observations suggest that although a link to Ic-BL SNe and GRBs remains credible given the smooth spectra and luminous radio and X-ray counterpart[s], AT2018cow is distinct in other ways and its true identity remains unclear. Observations are continuing." On 29 June 2018, astronomers, using 0.6 m (24 in) telescopes at the Beijing Astronomical Observatory, reported further support for the fading of AT 2018cow. However, using the Swift/XRT telescope on 30 June 2018, an increase in the X-ray luminosity of the transient was reported. That would be the beginning of an unusual X-ray variable behavior.

AT 2018cow

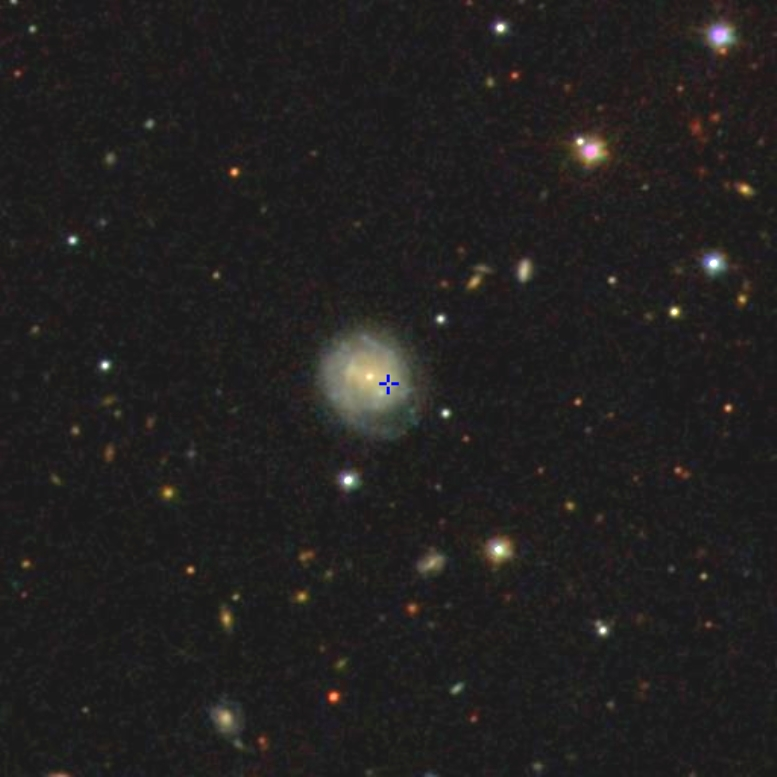
context

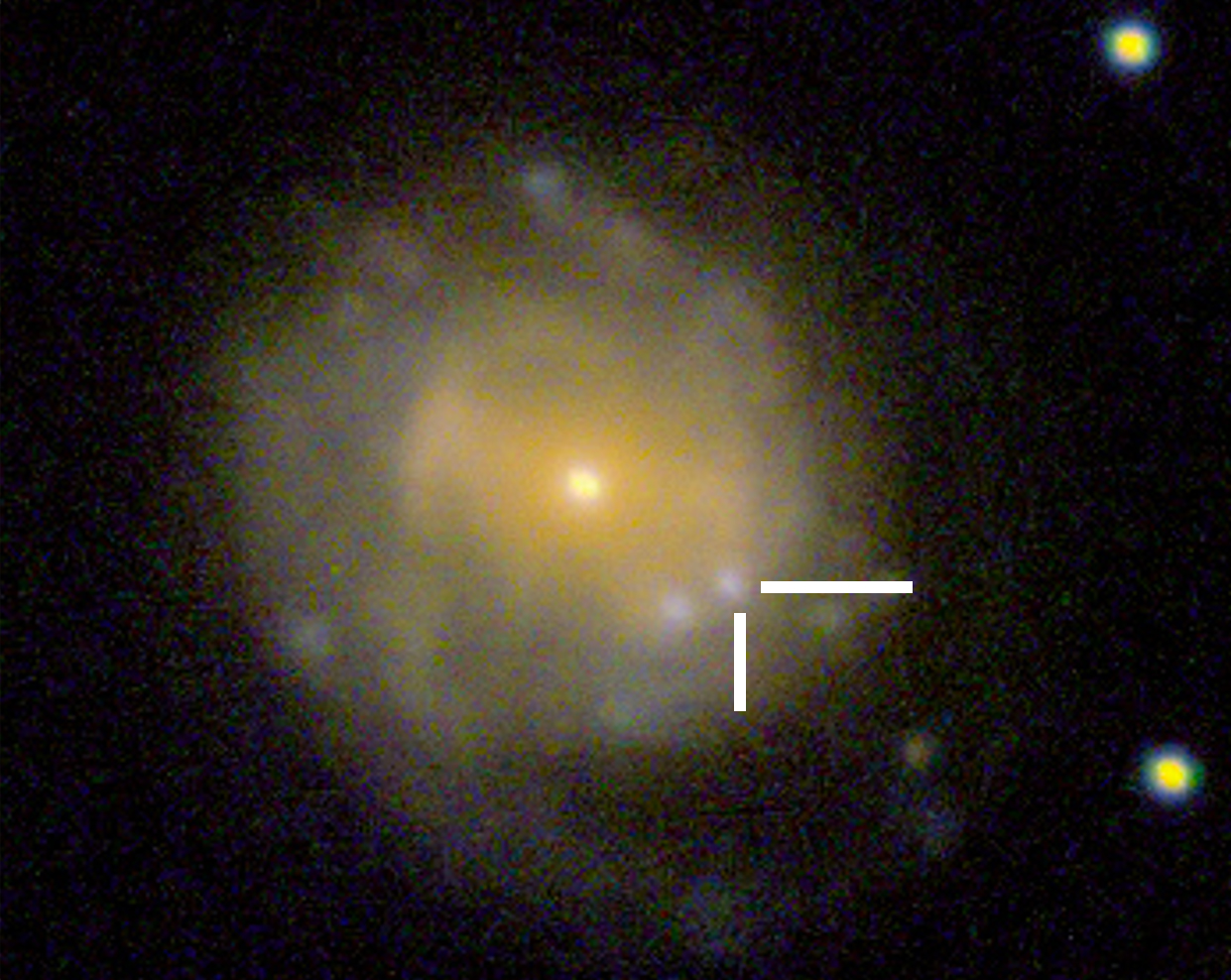
close-up

On 2 July 2018, astronomers, using the Fermi Large Area Telescope (LAT), reported that there were no significant >100 MeV gamma-ray emissions between 19–26 June 2018. Further, on 3 July 2018, astronomers reported, using the Cadmium Zinc Telluride Imager (CZTI) detector aboard the AstroSat space observatory, no hard X-ray transients were detected between 13–16 June 2018 (event detection time) and, using the UVIT fitted with a F172M filter, observed an AB magnitude of an estimated 17.6 at the AT 2018cow location on 3 July 2018. Moreover, astronomers on 3 July 2018 reported, using the MAXI GSC detector aboard the ISS, that no significant X-ray emissions were detected between 11–21 June 2018. On 4 July 2018, astronomers, using NuSTAR, reported a lessening of hard X-ray emissions from AT 2018cow. On 12 July 2018, astronomers, using INTEGRAL, reported no detections of the source from 30 June – 8 July 2018; however, GRB-like bursts may have been observed earlier in the vicinity, on 12 and 15 June 2018, although association of these bursts with AT 2018cow may be "disfavored".

Radio emissions, at 5 GHz with a flux density of ~ 170 microJy, were detected from the location of AT 2018cow on 3–4 July 2018 by e-MERLIN; radio emissions at the AT 2018cow location were detected by ATCA at 5.5 GHz with ~0.4 mJy flux density and at 9 GHz with ~1.0 mJy on 3 July 2018, and at 34 GHz with ~10 mJy on 5 July 2018. VLBI observations at 22 GHz, with the NRAO, using the VLBA and Effelsberg radio telescopes, found a total flux density of ~5 mJy around 8 July 2018 at a reportedly more accurate (but consistent within uncertainties) astrometric location of AT2018cow (RA=16h 16m 00.2242s, DEC=22d 16' 04.890") than that of e-MERLIN.

On 10 July 2018, astronomers, based on follow-up studies with the 2.56 m (101 in) Nordic Optical Telescope (NOT), formally described AT 2018cow as SN 2018cow and as a Type Ib supernova, showing an "unprecedented spectrum for a supernova of this class". On 19 July 2018, astronomers, using the 1.5 m (59 in) Kanata telescope at the Higashi-Hiroshima Observatory, observed further declines in the optical and near-infrared luminosity of the AT 2018cow position in early July 2018, and noted that the large decline rates of the light curves were "quite large" compared to Type Ic (Ic-BL) and Type Ib/c supernovae.

On 6 August 2018, ultraviolet observations of the AT 2018cow location, using the Wide Field Camera 3 (WFC3) on the Hubble Space Telescope (HST), detected brightness (Vega mag) of about 19 on all four bands (F218W, F225W, F275W, F336W) studied. On 12 August 2018, astronomers at the Giant Metrewave Radio Telescope (GMRT) detected a low frequency radio emission (1390 MHz band; 438+/-82 uJy) at the AT 2018cow position.

On 15 August 2018, astronomers using the High Energy Stereoscopic System (H.E.S.S.) array of Cherenkov telescopes (CTA) reported no significant gamma-ray source at the AT 2018cow location on 3–5 July 2018, which, as a consequence, resulted in the preliminary determination of upper limits on the integrated flux of the Very-High-Energy (VHE) gamma emission from AT 2018cow as follows: above the energy threshold 220 GeV (±2sd) an upper limit of 5e-12 ph cm^-2 s^-1; above 1 TeV (±2sd) an upper limit of 5e-13 ph cm^-2 s^-1.

== Properties ==
According to astronomers at the time of its discovery, the explosion, with a surface temperature of over 8,900 °C (16,000 °F; 9,200 K) and traveling 20,000 km/s (12,000 mi/s), may have been a cataclysmic variable star (CV), gamma-ray burst (GRB), gravitational wave (GW), supernova (SN), or something else. However, the CV scenario was rapidly disfavored given the initial featureless optical spectrum and the large initial X-ray luminosity of the transient. According to astronomer Kate Maguire of Queen's University Belfast: "It really just appeared out of nowhere. There are other objects that have been discovered that are as fast, but the fastness and the brightness, that's quite unusual."

The classification of Type Ic-BL indicates a spectrum with very unusually broad lines, but with no hydrogen lines and weak or missing helium lines. Such a spectrum is produced by the explosion of a very large star which has lost its outer layers of hydrogen and helium. However, according to astronomer Shubham Srivastav, associated with the 2.0 m (79 in) Himalayan Chandra Telescope (HCT): "Although spectroscopic features indicate a tentative similarity with broad line Ic supernovae, its true nature remains a puzzle." Also, according to Maguire: "We're not sure yet what it is, but the normal powering mechanism for a supernova is radioactive decay of nickel, and this event is too bright and too fast for that." The AT 2018cow explosion could have been accompanied by a gravitational wave (GW) emission, but the GW emission could not be detected since the LIGO detectors in the states of Washington and Louisiana were down at the time of the event due to service upgradings.

An explanation to help better understand the unique features of AT 2018cow, particularly as a white dwarf tidal disruption event, has been presented.

As of 29 September 2018, AT 2018cow has been explained in various ways, including as a Type Ic supernova, a gamma-ray burst, an interaction between a white dwarf and black hole, and as a magnetar. Preliminary studies to better understand the exact physical nature of AT 2018cow, using the European VLBI Network (EVN), have been presented.

On 2 November 2018, two independent teams of astronomers both concluded that the AT 2018cow event was "either a newly formed black hole in the process of accreting matter, or the frenetic rotation of a neutron star."

In January 2019, Anna Ho of the California Institute of Technology in Pasadena, who conducted observations with the Submillimeter Array on Mauna Kea in Hawaii, noted that an unusually protracted period of continuing activity after the event was noticed, enabled more extensive study than typically afforded during such events, allowing observation of it while it was brightening. Subsequently, astronomers proposed that AT 2018cow may have been a white dwarf being pulled apart by a black hole; or, a supernova leaving behind a black hole or a neutron star, the creation of a compact body being observed for the first time.

== See also ==
- Common envelope jets supernova – Supernova caused by a giant and compact star merging
- Superluminous supernova – Supernova at least ten times more luminous than a standard supernova
