= GRB 101225A =

Gamma-ray burst event of December 25, 2010

Christmas Burst
- Event type: Gamma-ray burst
- Date: c. 5.5 billion years ago (detected 25 December 2010 4:59 18:38 UTC)
- Duration: c. 28 minutes
- Constellation: Andromeda
- Right ascension: 00^{h} 00^{m} 47.51^{s}
- Declination: +44° 36′ 01.1″
- Distance: c. 5.5 billion ly
- Redshift: 0.33
- Other designations: GRB 101225A

Animations by NASA's Goddard Space Flight Center illustrating the two alternative explanations offered for GRB 101225A, the "Christmas burst."

GRB 101225A, also known as the "Christmas burst", was a cosmic explosion first detected by NASA's Swift observatory on Christmas Day 2010. The gamma-ray emission lasted at least 28 minutes, which is unusually long. Follow-up observations of the burst's afterglow by the Hubble Space Telescope and ground-based observatories were unable to determine the object's distance using spectroscopic methods.

In papers published in the journal Nature, two different groups of astronomers proposed different theories about the event's origin. Sergio Campana's group proposes that the event was caused by a comet crashing onto a neutron star within our own galaxy. Christina Thöne's group prefers a more conventional supernova mechanism, involving a merger between a helium star and a neutron star at a distance of about 5.5 billion light years from Earth.

== Observations ==
The gamma ray burst, in the constellation Andromeda, was first detected by the NASA Swift Gamma-Ray Burst Mission at 18:38 UT on December 25, 2010. The gamma-ray emission had a duration of at least 28 minutes, which is unusually long. After news of the gamma-ray burst was sent to other observatories, the longer-wavelength "afterglow" of the burst was monitored by on-ground observatories and the Hubble Space Telescope. After the unusually long duration of gamma emissions, x-ray emissions in the afterglow continued for just two days, an unusually short duration for this phase. Optical emissions observed over the first 10 days were characterized as those of "an expanding, cooling blackbody with a large initial radius". A faint light source appeared about 10 days after the burst and reached its maximum brightness 30 days after its appearance; observers described this light source as looking like a supernova.

On January 6, 2011, the 10m Keck-I telescope equipped with the Low Resolution Imaging Spectrometer (LRIS) conducted spectroscopic measurements of the host galaxy of GRB 101225A. A 900s spectrum was obtained; it consisted of blue and red channels, covering the wavelength ranges ~320–550 nm and ~500–820 nm, respectively. Isotropic energy was estimated at (7.8 ± 1.6)×10^{50} erg from the Burst Alert Telescope (BAT) data.

The unusual characteristics of the afterglow led astronomers to generate novel hypotheses to explain the event. Observers were unable to ascertain the burst's distance from Earth, and the two alternative hypotheses of its origin place the event at radically different distances.

== Hypotheses ==
Christina Thöne, of the Institute of Astrophysics of Andalusia in Spain, was lead author of a paper that proposed that the burst occurred in a binary system where a neutron star orbited a normal helium star that had just entered its red giant phase, which had enormously expanded its outer atmosphere. During the expansion, the red giant star engulfed the neutron star, resulting in both the ejection of the giant's atmosphere and rapid tightening of the neutron star's orbit. Once the two stars became wrapped in a common envelope of gas, the neutron star may have merged with the giant's core after just five orbits, or about 18 months. The result of the merger was the birth of a black hole or a magnetar and the production of oppositely directed jets of particles moving at nearly the speed of light, followed by a weak supernova, a common envelope jets supernova. The particle jets produced gamma rays. Jet interactions with gas ejected before the merger explain much of the burst's different nature. Based on this interpretation, the event took place about 5.5 billion light-years away (redshift 0.33), and the team has detected what may be a faint galaxy at the right location.

An alternative hypothesis, offered by a team led by Sergio Campana of the Brera Astronomical Observatory (INAF), proposes that GRB 101225A was produced by a comet-like object that fell into a neutron star located in our own galaxy, only some 10,000 light-years from Earth. In this model, the comet-like object falls onto the neutron star and is disrupted by tidal forces. Hard X-ray emission (the burst) results from the first matter falling onto the neutron star. X-ray emission and initial variations detected by Swift are attributed to clumps of material striking the star as the disc formed around it. Then the disk cools down and emits only at UV and optical wavelengths.

More recently, at the 2013 Huntsville Gamma-ray Burst Symposium, several scientists proposed that GRB 101225A, along with GRB 111209A and 121027A are part of a new class of gamma ray bursts, termed ultra-long bursts and caused by the collapse of low metallicity blue supergiant stars.

Andrew Levan and his colleagues used the Gemini North Telescope to determine that GRB 101225A was 7 billion light years distant much further than original estimates. This greater distance gives it a much higher energy level, which combined with longer duration and an absence of a supernova signature have led scientists, such as Bruce Gendre to suggest that these ultra-long bursts are the result of collapsing blue supergiant stars.

== Significance ==
Astrophysicist Sergio Campana told Space.com that he thinks this was "the discovery of a completely new astrophysical phenomenon that [had] not been envisaged before." He also said, "If tidal disruption of minor bodies around neutron stars is really happening", this event would not be "unique". Christina Thöne has said, "What the Christmas burst seems to be telling us is that the family of gamma-ray bursts is more diverse than we fully appreciate."
