= Common envelope jets supernova =

Supernova caused by a giant and compact star merging

Common envelope jets supernova (CEJSN) is a type of supernova, where the explosion is caused by the merger of a giant or supergiant star with a compact star such as a neutron star or a black hole. As the compact star plunges into the envelope of the giant/supergiant, it begins to accrete matter from the envelope and launches jets that can disrupt the envelope. Often, the compact star eventually merges with the core of the giant/supergiant; other times the infall stops before core merger.

This kind of supernova has been invoked to explain certain kinds of supernova-like phenomena, including iPTF14hls.

== History and process ==
In order to explain the unusual supernova iPTF14hls, Soker and Gilkis 2018 proposed a model where astrophysical jets eject the common envelope of a merging star. They may constitute 10^{–6} to 2 × 10^{–5} of all core collapse supernovae.

In their model, iPTF14hls was a binary star consisting of a giant star and a neutron star. The latter plunged into the envelope of the former and began to accrete material, emitting neutrinos as it did so but without substantially deforming the giant. Eventually, it would have reached the core of the giant and accreted mass at a sufficient rate to produce jets. These jets emanate from the polar areas of the neutron star and can effectively eject matter in these directions, but do not effectively act on material accreting along the neutron star's equatorial plane, which thus continues to reach the neutron star. The jets have masses of a fraction of the solar mass and a speed approaching the speed of light. They impact the envelope, inflating it in the form of large bubbles ("cocoons") that remove material from the envelope at speeds approaching a tenth of the speed of light. This causes the envelope of the giant star to be ejected over a timespan of a few hundred days, before the core itself is consumed in about a day, producing gravitational waves. The exiting jets can interact with pre-existent gas clouds around the giant, which creates the luminosity of the supernova and which can last for timespans reaching years. The infall of the neutron star into the giant also produces intense luminosity on timescales of days to months, but the overall luminosity curve depends on the details of the merger.

Depending on the original architecture of the stellar system, many variations on this general process are possible, such as when the incoming star is itself a binary such as a double neutron star or other combinations of a neutron star with a companion. In these cases, the binary may break up during the merger, with one of the binary objects ejected. The original core of the star may be tidally disrupted, forming an accretion disk around the neutron star. The incoming neutron star may instead be a black hole; these may be the source of cosmic ultra-high-energy neutrinos.

There are several processes that can cause the neutron star to penetrate the giant. Giant stars grow in size just at the end of their evolution, and can envelop a companion star in the process. When a star goes supernova and produces a neutron star, the neutron star receives a "kick" that causes it to penetrate the other star. Finally, interactions between the neutron star-giant binary with a third star, typically the third member star of the group, can cause the neutron star orbit to contract until it interacts with the envelope of the giant.

=== Concomitant processes ===
Already before the actual penetration, tidal acceleration of the giant's envelope by the neutron star causes it to expand, possibly clearing the polar regions of the giant of matter before the merger begins. This lets the jets exit the star from the poles before the neutron star merges with the core; otherwise they are only visible at the beginning of the envelope interaction or when the actual core interacts with the neutron star. The energy that the jets inject into the envelope can cause it to expand so that even when the orbit takes the neutron star out of the envelope, accretion and jet launching continue. These jets are weaker than the ones launched inside the original envelope, but are more efficient at creating radiation as they interact with already-emplaced gas.

A key requirement for the occurrence of a common envelope jets supernova is that the neutron star can form an accretion disk as it begins to absorb the material of the companion. Hydrodynamic simulations have offered contrasting results on whether this is possible and on the accretion rate resulting from the interaction, although there is empirical evidence that at least white dwarfs can generate such disks and jets; white dwarf properties resemble these of neutron stars. The process requires high accretion rates, which in turn require that large amounts of material and energy be removed from the proximity of the neutron star; this is accomplished through the emission of neutrinos, which carry energy away.

The conditions during a CEJSN may allow the r-process of nucleosynthesis to take place in the jets, in particular when a binary neutron star is involved, since unlike the core of a conventional supernova the CEJSN is not an effective neutrino source. Unlike regular neutron star mergers, the CEJSN is not delayed by the time it takes for the neutron star binary to shrink from gravitational wave emission and thus CEJSN can contribute r-process elements early in the history of the universe. The r-process element enrichment of the galaxy Reticulum II may be explained through a CEJSN, which efficiently distributed r-process elements across the galaxy. Computer simulations predict that CEJSNes can produce r-process elements past the lanthanides at a rate sufficient to explain extremely heavier-than-lanthanide rich stars.

== Examples ==
Apart from iPTF14hls, other events such as the supernovae SN1979c, SN1998e, SN2019zrk, SN 2020faa and the radio transient VT J121001+495647 have been proposed to be CEJSNs. The gamma-ray burst GRB 101225A could have formed through a common envelope jets supernova-like interaction with a helium star. A CEJSN where the core of the companion star was disrupted may have given rise to the enigmatic supernova remnant W49B. Fast blue optical transients might constitute CEJSNs as well. Metal-rich dwarf galaxies might have been produced by CEJSNs too.

=== Impostors ===
This process does not always result in the immediate destruction of the giant; if the giant star survives, a supernova impostor can occur instead, possible examples are the supernova SN 2009ip and the transient AT2018cow. The mass loss the giant suffers during the interaction can cause the orbit of the neutron star to expand and thus to exit the giant's envelope again; that way repeating explosions can occur since the core isn't destroyed by the merger. Eventually, a stripped core can be left that itself will go supernova and form another neutron star; this may be a major source of binary neutron stars.
