= IPTF14hls =

Supernova star in SDSS J092034.44+504148.7

iPTF14hls
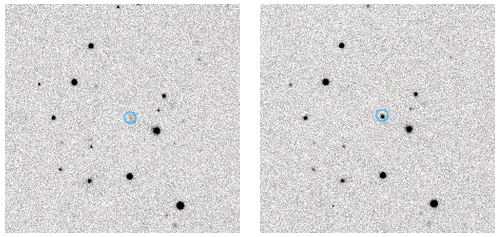
- Supernova iPTF14hls before and after detection

Observation data Epoch J2000 Equinox ICRS
- Constellation: Ursa Major
- Right ascension: 09^{h} 20^{m} 34.30^{s}
- Declination: +50° 41′ 46.80″
- Apparent magnitude (V): 17.716 (R)

Astrometry
| Distance | 156,200,000 pc (509,000,000 ly) pc |

Database references
| SIMBAD | data |

iPTF14hls is an unusual supernova star that erupted continuously for about 1,000 days beginning in September 2014 before becoming a remnant nebula. It had previously erupted in 1954. None of the theories nor proposed hypotheses fully explain all the aspects of the object.

== Observations ==
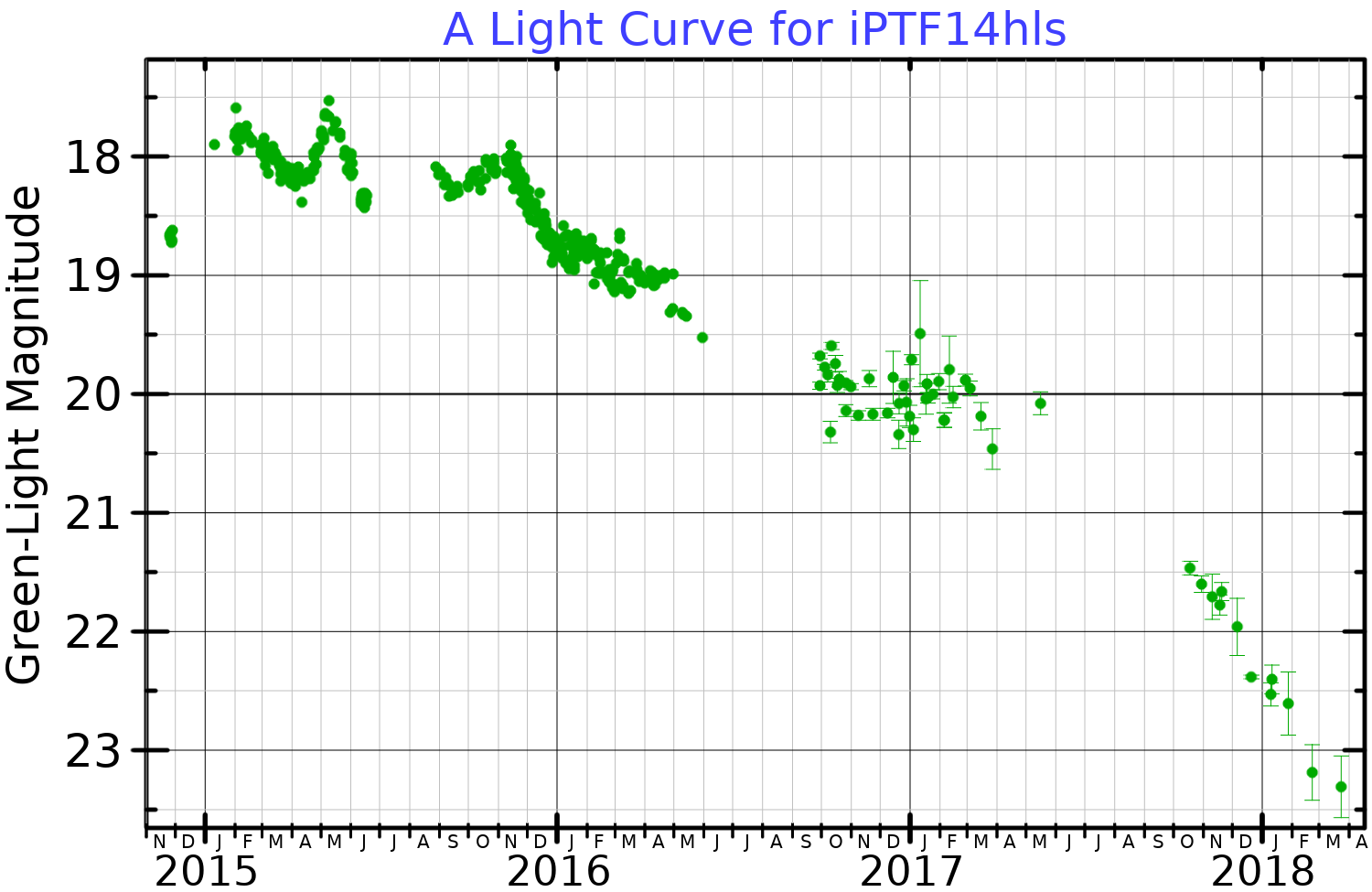
A green-light light curve for iPTF14hls, plotted from data published by Sollerman et al.

The star iPTF14hls was discovered in September 2014 by the Intermediate Palomar Transient Factory, and it was first made public in November 2014 by the CRTS survey as CSS141118:092034+504148. Based on that information, it was confirmed as an exploding star in January 2015. It was thought then that it was a single supernova event (Type II-P) that would dim in about 100 days, but instead, it continued its eruption for about 1,000 days while fluctuating in brightness at least five times. The brightness varied by as much as 50%, going through five peaks. Also, rather than cooling down with time as expected of a Type II-P supernova, the object maintains a near-constant temperature of about 5000–6000 K. Checks of photographs from the past found one from 1954 showing an explosion in the same location. Since 1954, the star has exploded six times.

The principal investigator is Iair Arcavi. His international team used the Low-Resolution Imaging Spectrometer (LRIS) on the Keck I telescope to obtain the spectrum of the star's host galaxy, and the Deep Imaging and Multi-Object Spectrograph (DEIMOS) on Keck II to obtain high-resolution spectra of the unusual supernova itself.

The host galaxy of iPTF14hls is a star-forming dwarf galaxy, implying low metal content, and the weak iron-line absorption seen in the supernova spectra are consistent with a low-metallicity progenitor. The study estimates that the star that exploded was at least 50 times more massive than the Sun. The researchers also remark that the debris expansion rate is slower than any other known supernova by a factor of 6, as if exploding in slow motion. However, if this were due to relativistic time dilation, then the spectrum would be red-shifted by the same factor of 6, which is inconsistent with their observations. In 2017, the expansion speed was constrained to approximately 1,000 km/s.

=== Ongoing observations ===
Arcavi's team continue monitoring the object in other bands of the spectrum in collaboration with additional international telescopes and observatories. These facilities include the Nordic Optical Telescope and NASA's Swift space telescope, the Fermi Gamma-ray Space Telescope, while the Hubble Space Telescope began to image the location in December 2017.

iPTF14hls was an ongoing event into 2018, when after about 1,000 days, its light displayed a dramatic drop, but the event remained visible, and by November 2018 its spectra had become a remnant nebula. A high-resolution image of this latest phase was obtained with the Hubble Space Telescope during Cycle 25 (October 1, 2017, to September 30, 2018).

== Hypotheses ==
Current theory predicts that the star would consume all its hydrogen in the first supernova explosion and, depending on the initial size of the star, the remnants of the core should form a neutron star or a black hole. However, these mechanisms are unable to reproduce the observed light curve with its very long bright plateau and multiple brighter peaks. None of the hypotheses published before early 2018—the first three listed below—could explain the continued presence of hydrogen or the energetics observed. According to Iair Arcavi, this discovery requires refinement of existing explosion scenarios, or the development of a new scenario, that can:

1. produce the same spectral signatures as common Type IIP supernovae but with an evolution slowed by a factor of 6 to 10,
2. provide energy to prolong the light curve by a factor of ~6 while not introducing narrow-line spectral features or strong radio and X-ray emission indicative of circumstellar material interaction,
3. produce at least five peaks in the light curve,
4. decouple the deduced line-forming photosphere from the continuum photosphere, and
5. maintain a photospheric phase with a constant line velocity gradient for over 600 days.

=== Antimatter ===
One hypothesis involves burning antimatter in a stellar core; this hypothesis holds that massive stars become so hot in their cores that energy is converted into matter and antimatter, causing the star to become extremely unstable, and undergo repeated bright eruptions over periods of years. Antimatter in contact with matter would cause an explosion that blows off the outer layers of the star and leaves the core intact; this process can repeat over decades before the large final explosion and collapse to a black hole.

=== Pulsational pair-instability supernova ===
Another hypothesis is the pulsational pair-instability supernova, in which a massive star may lose about half its mass before a series of violent pulses begins. On every pulse, material rushing away from the star can catch up with earlier ejected material, producing bright flashes of light as it collides, simulating an additional explosion (see supernova impostor). However, the energy released by the iPTF14hls supernova is more than the theory predicts.

=== Magnetar ===
Magnetar models can also explain many of the observed features, but give a smooth light curve and may require an evolving magnetic field strength.

=== Shock interaction ===
Jennifer E Andrews and Nathan Smith hypothesised that the observed light spectrum is a clear signature of shock interaction of ejected material with dense circumstellar material (CSM). They proposed that a typical explosion energy, with "enveloped" or "swallowed" CSM interaction—as seen in some recent supernovae, including SN 1998S, SN 2009ip, and SN 1993J—could "explain the peculiar evolution of iPTF14hls."

In December 2017, a team using the Fermi Gamma-ray Space Telescope reported that they may have detected in iPTF14hls, for the first time, high energy gamma-ray emission from a supernova. The gamma-ray source appears ~ 300 days after the explosion of iPTF14hls, and is still observable, but more observations are needed to verify that iPTF14hls is the exact source of the observed gamma-ray emission. If the association between the gamma-ray source and iPTF14hls is real, then there are difficulties with modelling its gamma-ray emission in the framework of particle acceleration in supernova-ejecta-produced shock. The energy conversion efficiency needs to be very high, so it is suggested that a jet (anisotropic emission) from a close companion may be necessary to explain some of the observed data. No X-ray emissions have been detected, which makes the interpretation of the gamma-ray emission a difficult task.

=== Common envelope jets ===
This hypothesis suggests common envelope jets supernova (CEJSN) impostors resulting from a neutron star companion. It proposes "a new type of repeating transient outburst initiated by a neutron star entering the envelope of an evolved massive star, accreting envelope material and subsequently launching jets which interact with their surroundings." The ejecta could reach velocities of 10,000 km/s despite not being a supernova.

=== Fall-back accretion ===
One team suggests the possibility that the observed slow expansion may be an effect of fall-back accretion, and presented a model.

=== Variable hyper-wind ===
A long-term outflow similar to stellar winds with variable mass-loss rates rather than a sudden outburst like supernovae could fit the data of the light curve not only of iPTF14hls, but also of Eta Carinae. The observations could be a result of extreme wind from very massive stars.

== See also ==
- Eta Carinae, a massive star undergoing similar eruptions
