= Pulsational pair-instability supernova =

Supernova impostor event

A pulsational pair-instability supernova is a supernova impostor event that generally occurs in stars at around 100 to 130 solar mass (M_{☉}), as opposed to a typical pair-instability supernova which occurs in stars of 130 to 250 M_{☉}. Like pair-instability supernovae, pulsational pair-instability supernovae are caused by draining of a star's energy in the production of electron-positron pairs but, whereas a pair-instability supernova completely disrupts the star in a massive supernova, the star's pulsational pair-instability eruption sheds 10–25 M_{☉}. This generally shrinks it down to a mass of less than 100 M_{☉}, too small for electron-positron pair creation, where it then undergoes a core-collapse supernova or hypernova. It is possible that this is what occurred during the 1843 eruption of the primary star of the Eta Carinae star system although there is no substantial evidence supporting this.

== Stellar behaviours ==
=== Below 100 M_{☉} ===
Thermal gamma rays in the cores of stars of less than 100 M_{☉} are not energetic enough to produce electron-positron pairs. Some of these stars will become supernovae at the end of their lives, but the causative mechanisms are unrelated to pair-instability.

=== 100–130 M_{☉} ===
In stars of 100–130 M_{☉}, a pulsational pair-instability supernova can occur. Stars like this are massive enough that the gamma rays are energetic enough to produce electron-positron pairs but it is generally not enough to completely blow up the star. The carbon-burning core compresses and heats up as the electron-positron pairs remove pressure from outwards photons, until the oxygen stored in the core suddenly ignites in a thermal runaway reaction which exerts a pulse outwards, then stabilises. As a result, the likely outcome will be a pulsational pair-instability supernova, in which the star will eject a large amount of its mass, which will generally bring it under 100 M_{☉} where it will typically undergo a normal core-collapse supernova. ^{[2][1]}

=== Above 130 M_{☉} ===
Stars above 130 M_{☉} will have enough mass to create pairs of electrons and positrons; in these stars there will be greater pair production than in stars less than 130 M_{☉}. Stars of 130 to 150 M_{☉} will often undergo pulsational pair-instability supernovae and potentially undergo more than one pulsation to bring its mass under 100 M_{☉} although they can potentially go full supernova. Stars above 150 M_{☉} will generally produce much greater levels of electron-positron pairs and will usually produce more than just that required of a pulsational pair-instability supernova. The star will heat up more than in the 100–130 M_{☉} stars and the thermal runaway reaction when the oxygen fuel ignites will be far greater. As a result, most stars above 150 M_{☉} will undergo a complete pair-instability supernova ^{[2][1]}.

== Physics ==
=== Photon pressure ===
Light in thermal equilibrium has a black-body spectrum with an energy density proportional to the fourth power of the temperature (hence the Stefan–Boltzmann law). The wavelength of maximum emission from a blackbody is inversely proportional to its temperature. That is, the frequency, and the energy, of the greatest population of photons of black-body radiation is directly proportional to the temperature, and reaches the gamma ray energy range at temperatures above 3×10^{8} K.

In very large hot stars, pressure from gamma rays in the stellar core keeps the upper layers of the star supported against gravitational pull from the core. If the energy density of gamma rays is suddenly reduced, then the outer layers of the star will collapse inwards. The sudden heating and compression of the core generates gamma rays energetic enough to be converted into an avalanche of electron-positron pairs, further reducing the pressure. When the collapse stops, the positrons find electrons and the pressure from gamma rays is driven up, again.

=== Pair creation and annihilation ===
Sufficiently energetic gamma rays can interact with nuclei, electrons, or one another to produce electron-positron pairs, and electron-positron pairs can annihilate, producing gamma rays. From Einstein's equation E = mc^{2}, gamma rays must have more energy than the mass of the electron–positron pairs to produce these pairs.

At the high densities of a stellar core, pair production and annihilation occur rapidly, thereby keeping gamma rays, electrons, and positrons in thermal equilibrium. The higher the temperature, the higher the gamma ray energies, and the larger the amount of energy transferred.

=== Pair-instability ===
As temperatures and gamma ray energies increase, more and more gamma ray energy is absorbed in creating electron-positron pairs. This reduction in gamma ray energy density reduces the radiation pressure that supports the outer layers of the star. The star contracts, compressing and heating the core, thereby increasing the proportion of energy absorbed by pair creation. Pressure nonetheless increases, but in a pair-instability collapse, the increase in pressure is not enough to resist the increase in gravitational forces as the star becomes denser.

== Light curves and spectra ==
Pulsational pair-instability supernovae are likely the most common pair-instability events and are probably common causes of supernova impostor events. Depending on the nature of the progenitor star they may take the appearance of either a type II, type Ib or type Ic supernova. ^{[2]}. Like full scale pair-instability supernovae, pulsational pair-instability supernova are very bright and last for many months longer than a typical type II or type I supernova.

== Known pulsational pair-instability events ==
Possible examples of pulsational pair-instability supernovae include the 1843 eruption of Eta Carinae A, and possibly SN 1000+0216 which could have been either a pulsational pair-instability supernova or a supernova of pair-instability. The 1961 Supernova-like events SN 1961V and SN 2010dn are believed to be the potential supernova impostors involving a massive LBVs (luminous blue variables) and could have been pair-instability pulsations, as could the repeating events at iPTF14hls.
