= SN UDS10Wil =

Supernova in Cetus

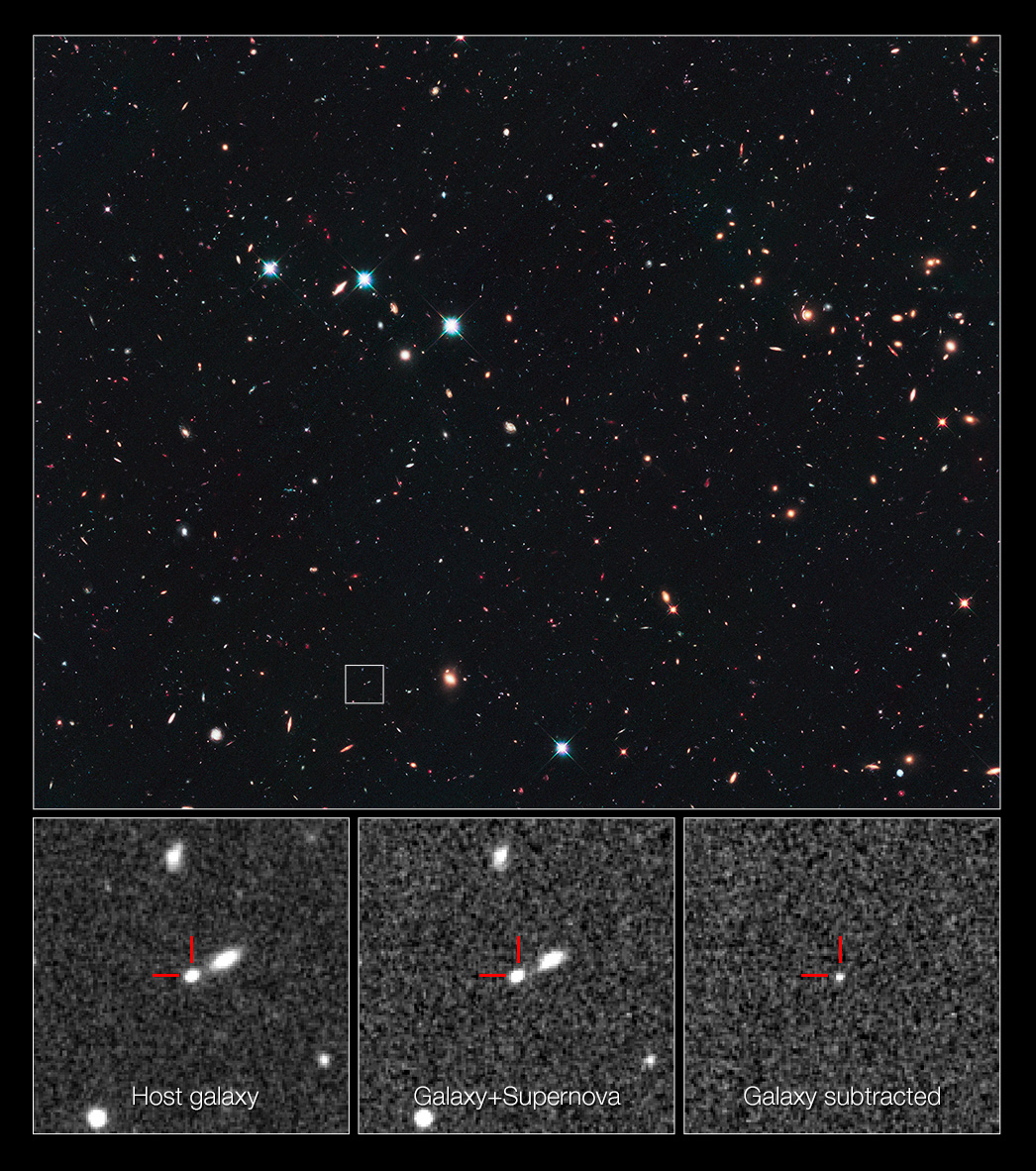
- Record-breaking supernova SN UDS10Wil in the CANDELS Ultra Deep Survey
- Event type: Supernova
- Ia
- Constellation: Cetus
- Right ascension: 02^{h} 17^{m} 46^{s}
- Declination: −05° 15′ 23″
- Epoch: J2000
- Distance: 16,600 megalight-years (5,100 Mpc)
- Redshift: 1.914
- Other designations: SN UDS10Wil, SN Wilson
- Related media on Commons

SN UDS10Wil (SN Wilson) is a type Ia supernova, and as of April 2013, the farthest known.

It has a redshift of 1.914, which strongly implies that it exploded when the universe was about a third of its current size. It was discovered with the Hubble Space Telescope's Wide Field Camera 3. The nickname SN Wilson is after the American President Woodrow Wilson.

== See also ==
- List of most distant supernovae
- List of the most distant astronomical objects
