= Pair-instability supernova =

Type of high-energy supernova in very large stars

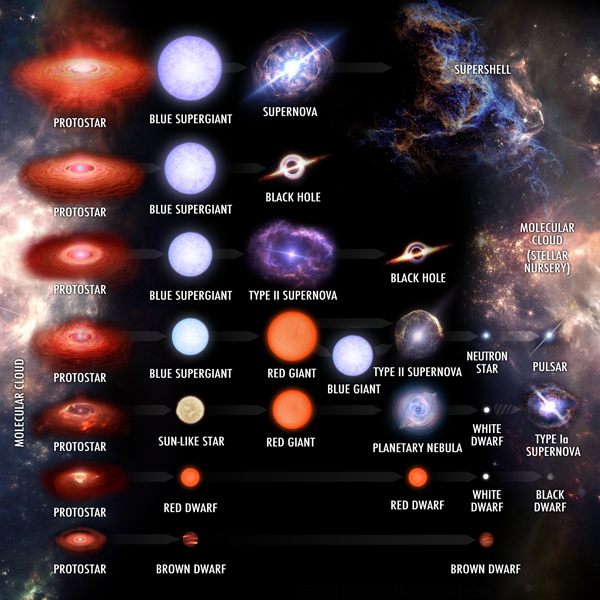
Stellar evolution showing a blue supergiant that dies as a supernova without a remnant, which is the pair-instability supernova.

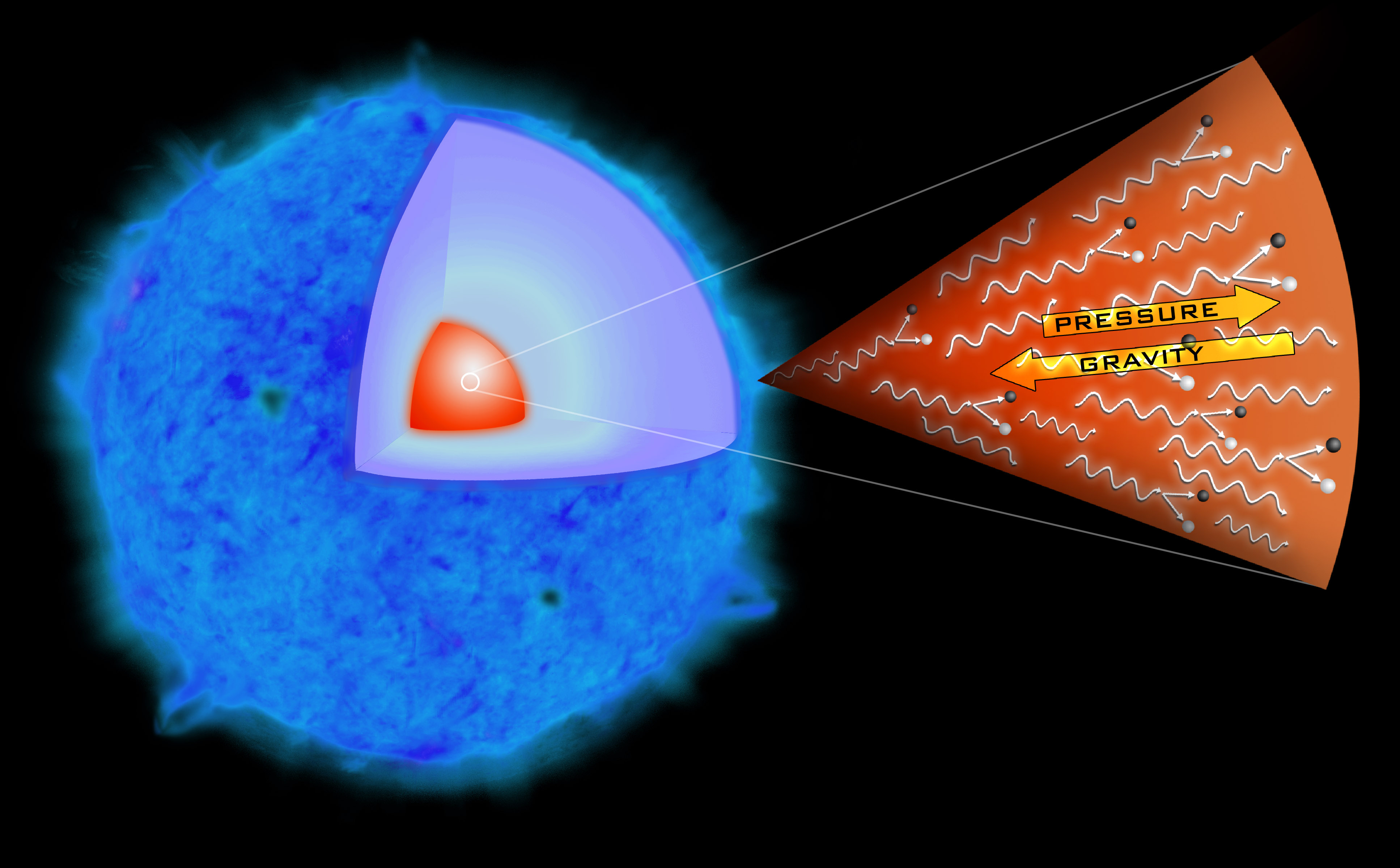
When a star is very massive, the gamma rays produced in its core can become so energetic that some of their energy is drained away into production of particle and antiparticle pairs. The resulting drop in radiation pressure causes the star to partially collapse under its own huge gravity. After this violent collapse, runaway thermonuclear reactions (not shown here) ensue and the star explodes.

A pair-instability supernova is a type of supernova predicted to occur when pair production — the production of free electrons and positrons in the collision between atomic nuclei and energetic gamma rays — temporarily reduces the internal radiation pressure supporting a supermassive star's core against gravitational collapse. This pressure drop leads to a partial collapse, which in turn causes greatly accelerated burning in a runaway thermonuclear explosion, resulting in the star being blown completely apart without leaving a stellar remnant behind.

Pair-instability supernovae can only happen in stars with a mass range from around 130 to 250 solar masses and low to moderate metallicity (low abundance of elements other than hydrogen and helium – a situation common in Population III stars).

== Physics ==
=== Photon emission ===
Photons given off by a body in thermal equilibrium have a black-body spectrum with an energy density proportional to the fourth power of the temperature, as described by the Stefan–Boltzmann law. Wien's law states that the wavelength of maximum emission from a black body is inversely proportional to its temperature. Equivalently, the frequency, and the energy, of the peak emission is directly proportional to the temperature.

=== Photon pressure in stars ===
In very massive, hot stars with interior temperatures above about 300000000 K (3×10^{8} K), photons produced in the stellar core are primarily in the form of very high-energy gamma rays. The pressure from these gamma rays fleeing outward from the core helps to hold up the upper layers of the star against the inward pull of gravity. If the emission of gamma rays (the energy density) is reduced, then the outer layers of the star will begin to collapse inwards.

Gamma rays with sufficiently high energy can interact with nuclei, electrons, or one another. One possible interaction is to form pairs of particles, such as electron-positron pairs; these pairs can then meet and annihilate each other to create additional gamma rays, in accordance with Albert Einstein's mass-energy equivalence equation E = m c² .

At the very high density of a large stellar core, pair production and annihilation occur rapidly. Gamma rays, electrons, and positrons are overall held in thermal equilibrium, ensuring the star's core remains stable. By random fluctuation, the sudden heating and compression of the core can generate gamma rays energetic enough to be converted into an avalanche of electron-positron pairs. This reduces the pressure. When the collapse stops, the positrons find electrons and the pressure from gamma rays is driven up, again. The population of positrons provides a brief reservoir of new gamma rays as the expanding supernova's core pressure drops.

=== Pair-instability ===
As temperatures and gamma ray energies increase, more and more gamma ray energy is absorbed in creating electron–positron pairs. This reduction in gamma ray energy density reduces the radiation pressure that resists gravitational collapse and supports the outer layers of the star. The star contracts, compressing and heating the core, thereby increasing the rate of energy production. This increases the energy of the gamma rays that are produced, making them more likely to interact, and so increases the rate at which energy is absorbed in further pair production. As a result, the stellar core loses its support in a runaway process, in which gamma rays are created at an increasing rate; but more and more of the gamma rays are absorbed to produce electron–positron pairs, and the annihilation of the electron–positron pairs is insufficient to halt further contraction of the core. Finally, the thermal runaway ignites detonation fusion of oxygen and heavier elements. When the temperature reaches the level when electrons and positrons carry the same energy fraction as gamma-rays, pair production cannot increase any further; it is balanced by annihilation. Contraction no longer accelerates, but the core now produces much more energy than prior to collapse, and this results in a supernova: the outer layers of the star are blown away by sudden large increase of power production in the core. Calculations suggest that so much of the outer layers are lost that the very hot core itself is no longer under sufficient pressure to keep it intact, and it is completely disrupted too.

== Stellar susceptibility ==
For a star to undergo pair-instability supernova, the increased creation of positron/electron pairs by gamma ray collisions must reduce outward pressure enough for inward gravitational pressure to overwhelm it. High rotational speed and/or metallicity can prevent this. Stars with these characteristics still contract as their outward pressure drops, but unlike their slower or less metal-rich cousins, these stars continue to exert enough outward pressure to prevent gravitational collapse.

Stars formed by collision mergers having a metallicity Z between 0.02 and 0.001 may end their lives as pair-instability supernovae if their mass is in the appropriate range.

Very large high-metallicity stars are likely unstable due to the Eddington limit, and would tend to shed mass during the formation process.

== Stellar behavior ==
Supernovae vs initial mass and metallicity

Several sources describe the stellar behavior for large stars in pair-instability conditions.

=== Below 100 solar masses ===
Gamma rays produced by stars of fewer than 100 or so solar masses are not energetic enough to produce electron-positron pairs. Some of these stars will undergo supernovae of a different type at the end of their lives, but the causative mechanisms do not involve pair-instability.

=== 100 to 130 solar masses ===
These stars are large enough to produce gamma rays with enough energy to create electron-positron pairs, but the resulting net reduction in counter-gravitational pressure is insufficient to cause the core-overpressure required for supernova. Instead, the contraction caused by pair-creation provokes increased thermonuclear activity within the star that repulses the inward pressure and returns the star to equilibrium. It is thought that stars of this size undergo a series of these pulses until they shed sufficient mass to drop below 100 solar masses, at which point they are no longer hot enough to support pair-creation. Pulsing of this nature may have been responsible for the variations in brightness experienced by Eta Carinae in 1843, though this explanation is not universally accepted.

=== 130 to 250 solar masses ===
For very high-mass stars, with mass at least 130 and up to perhaps roughly 250 solar masses, a true pair-instability supernova can occur. In these stars, the first time that conditions support pair production instability, the situation runs out of control. The collapse proceeds to efficiently compress the star's core; the overpressure is sufficient to allow runaway nuclear fusion to burn it in several seconds, creating a thermonuclear explosion. With more thermal energy released than the star's gravitational binding energy, it is completely disrupted; no black hole or other remnant is left behind. This is predicted to contribute to a "mass gap" in the mass distribution of stellar black holes. (This "upper mass gap" is to be distinguished from a suspected "lower mass gap" in the range of a few solar masses.)

In addition to the immediate energy release, a large fraction of the star's core is transformed to nickel-56, a radioactive isotope which decays with a half-life of 6.1 days into cobalt-56. Cobalt-56 has a half-life of 77 days and then further decays to the stable isotope iron-56 (see Supernova nucleosynthesis). For the hypernova SN 2006gy, studies indicate that perhaps 40 solar masses of the original star were released as ^{56}Ni, almost the entire mass of the star's core regions. Collision between the exploding star core and gas it ejected earlier, and radioactive decay, release most of the visible light.

=== 250 solar masses or more ===
A different reaction mechanism, photodisintegration, follows the initial pair-instability collapse in stars of at least 250 solar masses. This endothermic (energy-absorbing) reaction absorbs the excess energy from the earlier stages before the runaway fusion can cause a hypernova explosion; the star then collapses completely into a black hole.

== Appearance ==
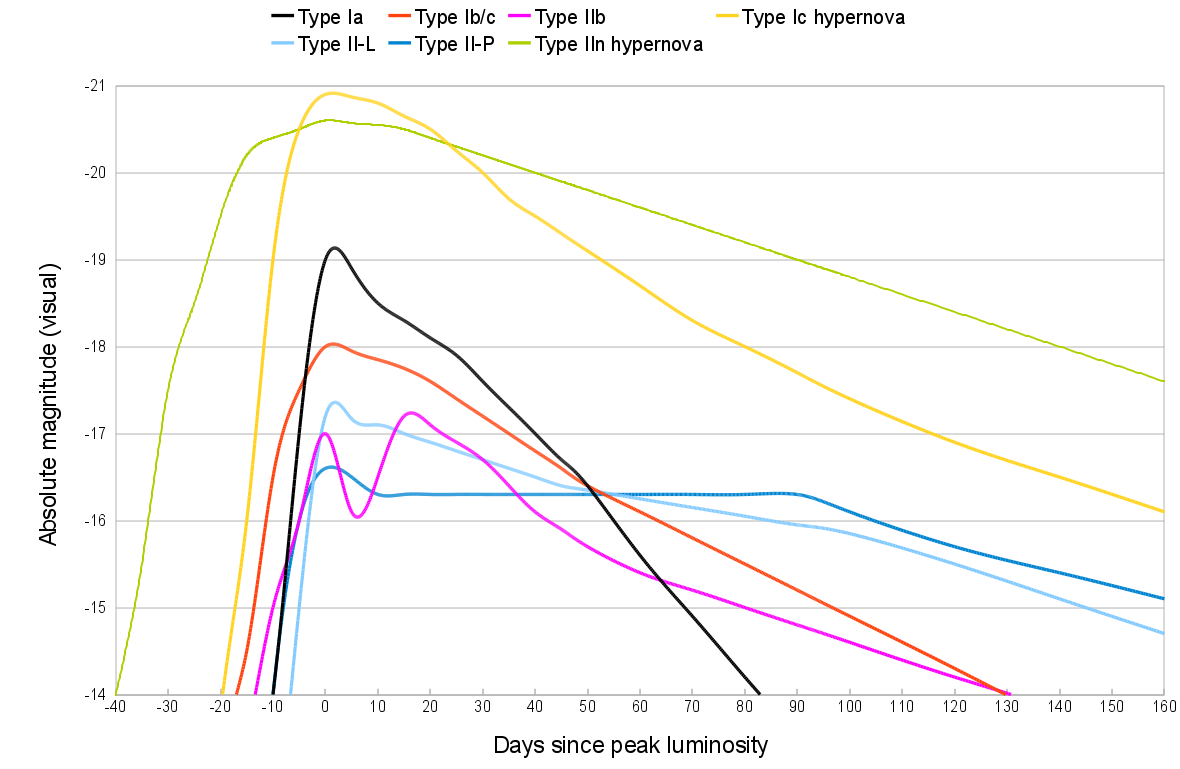
Light curves compared to normal supernovae

=== Luminosity ===
Pair-instability supernovae are popularly thought to be highly luminous. This is only the case for the most massive progenitors since the luminosity depends strongly on the ejected mass of radioactive ^{56}Ni. They can have peak luminosities of over 10^{37} W, brighter than Type Ia supernovae, but at lower masses peak luminosities are less than 10^{35} W, comparable to or less than typical Type II supernovae.

=== Spectrum ===
The spectra of pair-instability supernovae depend on the nature of the progenitor star. Thus they can appear as Type II or Type Ib/c supernova spectra. Progenitors with a significant remaining hydrogen envelope will produce a Type II supernova, those with no hydrogen but significant helium will produce a Type Ib, and those with no hydrogen and virtually no helium will produce a Type Ic.

=== Light curves ===
In contrast to the spectra, the light curves are quite different from the common types of supernova. The light curves are highly extended, with peak luminosity occurring months after onset. This is due to the extreme amounts of ^{56}Ni expelled, and the optically dense ejecta, as the star is entirely disrupted.

=== Remnant ===
Remnants of single massive stars

Pair-instability supernovae completely destroy the progenitor star and do not leave behind a neutron star or black hole. The entire mass of the star is ejected, so a nebular remnant is produced and many solar masses of heavy elements are ejected into interstellar space.

== Pair-instability supernovae candidates ==
Some supernovae candidates for classification as pair-instability supernovae include:

- SN 2006gy
- SN 2007bi,
- SN 2213-1745
- SN 1000+0216,
- SN 2010mb
- OGLE14-073,
- SN 2016aps
- SN 2016iet,
- SN 2018ibb,
- SN 2023vbw

== See also ==
- Pair production
- Pulsational pair-instability supernova
- Thermal runaway
- Type Ia supernova, "thermonuclear supernova"
- Intermediate-mass black hole
