= SN 2007bi =

Supernova in the constellation Virgo

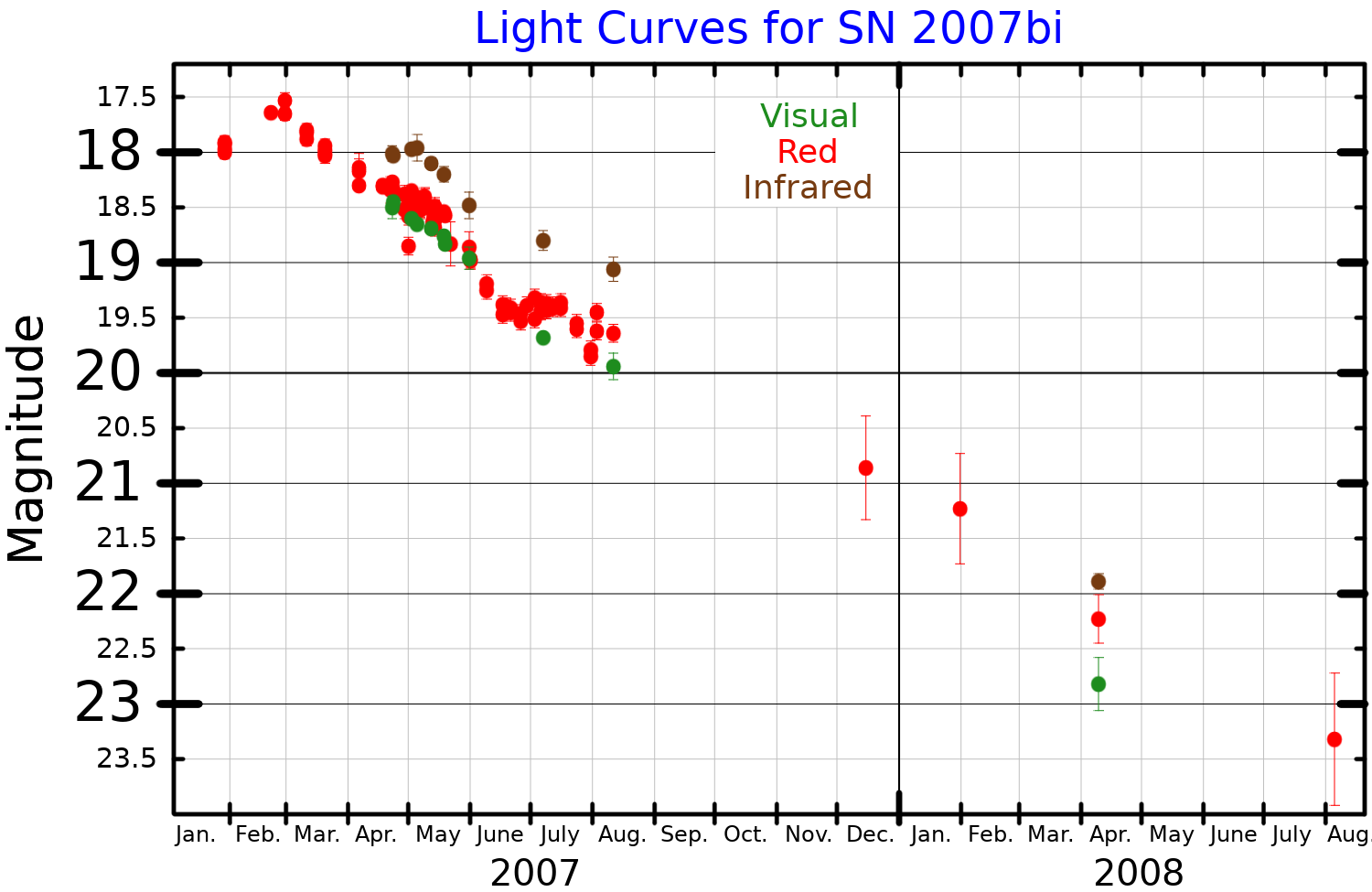
- Light curves for three photometric bands, plotted from data obtained from the Open Supernova Catalog
- Event type: Supernova
- Type Ic
- Date: by Nearby Supernova Factory; USA
- Constellation: Virgo
- Right ascension: 13^{h} 19^{m} 20.19^{s}
- Declination: +08° 55′ 44.3″
- Epoch: J2000.0
- Galactic coordinates: 324.1496 +70.6427
- Host: Anon J131920+0855

SN 2007bi was an extremely energetic supernova discovered early in 2007 by the international Nearby Supernova Factory based at the U.S. Department of Energy's Lawrence Berkeley National Laboratory. The precursor star is estimated to have had 200 solar masses at the time of its formation and around 100 solar masses in its core when it went supernova. The explosion ejected more than 22 solar masses of silicon and other heavy elements into space during this supernova including more than 6 solar masses of radioactive nickel which caused the expanding gases to glow very brightly for many months.

The supernova has been described as an unambiguous fit for the pair-instability supernova model.
