= Supernova Legacy Survey =

Project designed to investigate dark energy

- Target: supernovae

The Supernova Legacy Survey Program is a project designed to investigate dark energy, by detecting and monitoring approximately 2000 high-redshift supernovae between 2003 and 2008, using MegaPrime, a large CCD mosaic at the Canada-France-Hawaii Telescope. It also carries out detailed spectroscopy of a subsample of distant supernovae.
