= Superluminous supernova =

Supernova at least ten times more luminous than a standard supernova

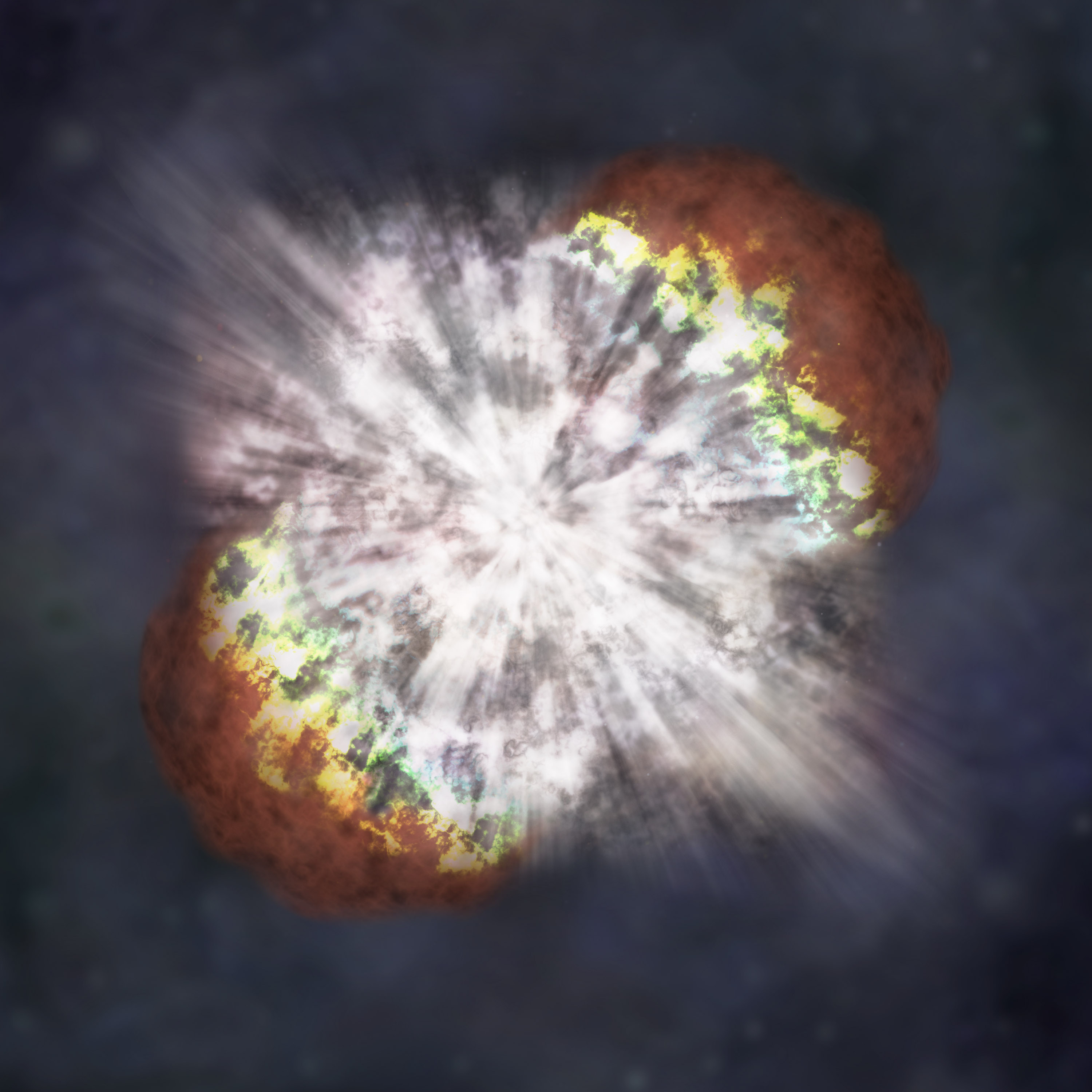
NASA artist's impression of the explosion of SN 2006gy, a superluminous supernova

A superluminous supernova (SLSN, plural superluminous supernovae or SLSNe) is a type of stellar explosion with a luminosity 10 or more times higher than that of standard supernovae. Like supernovae, SLSNe seem to be produced by several mechanisms, which is readily revealed by their light-curves and spectra. There are multiple models for what conditions may produce an SLSN, including core collapse in particularly massive stars, millisecond magnetars, interaction with circumstellar material (CSM model), or pair-instability supernovae.

The first confirmed superluminous supernova connected to a gamma ray burst was not found until 2003, when GRB 030329 flared up in the constellation Leo. SN 2003dh represented the death of a star 25 times more massive than the Sun, with material being blasted out at over a tenth the speed of light.

Stars with M ≥ 40 M_{☉} are likely to produce superluminous supernovae.

== Classification ==
Discoveries of many SLSNe in the 21st century showed that not only were they more luminous by an order of magnitude than most supernovae, their remnants were also unlikely to be powered by the typical radioactive decay that is responsible for the observed energies of conventional supernovae.

SLSNe events use a separate classification scheme to distinguish them from the conventional Type Ia, Type Ib/Ic, and Type II supernovae, roughly distinguishing between the spectral signature of hydrogen-rich and hydrogen-poor events.

Hydrogen-rich SLSNe are classified as Type SLSN-II, with observed radiation passing through the changing opacity of a thick expanding hydrogen envelope. Most hydrogen-poor events are classified as Type SLSN-I, with its visible radiation produced from a large expanding envelope of material powered by an unknown mechanism. A third less common group of SLSNe is also hydrogen-poor and abnormally luminous, referred to as SLSN-R, clearly powered by radioactivity from ^{56}Ni.

Increasing number of discoveries find that some SLSNe do not fit cleanly into these three classes, so further sub-classes or unique events have been described. Many or all SLSN-I show spectra without hydrogen or helium but have lightcurves comparable to conventional Type Ic supernovae, and are now classed as SLSN-Ic. PS1-10afx is an unusually red hydrogen-free SLSN with an extremely rapid rise to a near-record peak luminosity and an unusually rapid decline. PS1-11ap is similar to a Type Ic SLSN but has an unusually slow rise and decline.

== Astrophysical models ==
A wide variety of causes have been proposed to explain events that are an order of magnitude or more greater than standard supernovae. The collapsar and CSM (circumstellar material) models are generally accepted and a number of events are well-observed. Other models are still only tentatively accepted or remain entirely theoretical.

=== Collapsar model ===
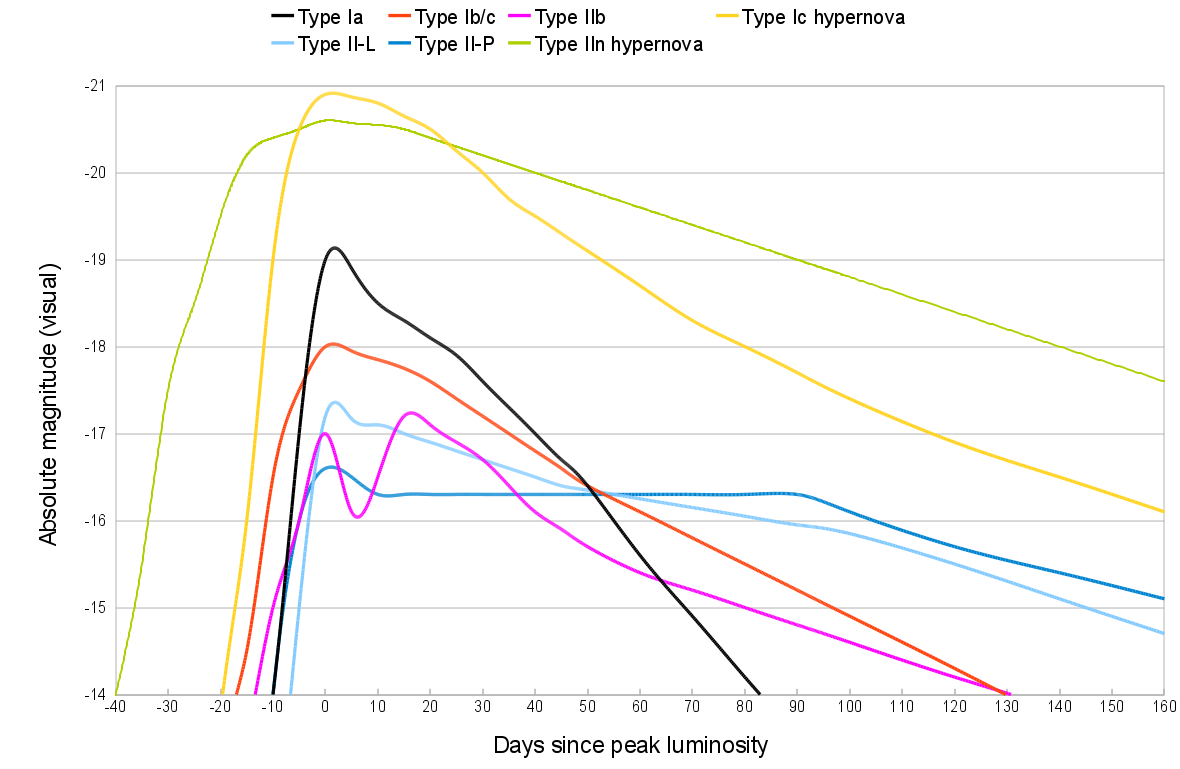
Light curves compared to normal supernovae

The collapsar model is a type of superluminous supernova that produces a gravitationally collapsed object, or black hole. The word "collapsar", short for "collapsed star", was formerly used to refer to the end product of stellar gravitational collapse, a stellar-mass black hole. The word is now sometimes used to refer to a specific model for the collapse of a fast-rotating star. When core collapse occurs in a star with a core at least around fifteen times the Sun's mass (M_{☉})—though chemical composition and rotational rate are also significant—the explosion energy is insufficient to expel the outer layers of the star, and it will collapse into a black hole without producing a visible supernova outburst.

A star with a core mass slightly below this level—in the range of 5–15 M_{☉}—will undergo a supernova explosion, but so much of the ejected mass falls back onto the core remnant that it still collapses into a black hole. If such a star is rotating slowly, then it will produce a faint supernova, but if the star is rotating quickly enough, then the fallback to the black hole will produce relativistic jets. The energy that these jets transfer into the ejected shell renders the visible outburst substantially more luminous than a standard supernova. The jets also beam high energy particles and gamma rays directly outward and thereby produce x-ray or gamma-ray bursts; the jets can last for several seconds or longer and correspond to long-duration gamma-ray bursts, but they do not appear to explain short-duration gamma-ray bursts.

Stars with 5–15 M_{☉} cores have an approximate total mass of 25–90 M_{☉}, assuming the star has not undergone significant mass loss. Such a star will still have a hydrogen envelope and will explode as a Type II supernova. Faint Type II supernovae have been observed, but no definite candidates for a Type II SLSN (except Type IIn, which are not thought to be jet supernovae). Only the very lowest metallicity population III stars will reach this stage of their life with little mass loss. Other stars, including most of those visible to us, will have had most of their outer layers blown away by their high luminosity and become Wolf-Rayet stars. Some theories propose these will produce either Type Ib or Type Ic supernovae, but none of these events so far has been observed in nature. Many observed SLSNe are likely Type Ic. Those associated with gamma-ray bursts are almost always Type Ic, being very good candidates for having relativistic jets produced by fallback to a black hole. However, not all Type Ic SLSNe correspond to observed gamma-ray bursts but the events would only be visible if one of the jets were aimed towards us.

In recent years, much observational data on long-duration gamma-ray bursts have significantly increased our understanding of these events and made clear that the collapsar model produces explosions that differ only in detail from more or less ordinary supernovae and have energy ranges from approximately normal to around 100 times larger.

A good example of a collapsar SLSN is SN 1998bw, which was associated with the gamma-ray burst GRB 980425. It is classified as a Type Ic supernova due to its distinctive spectral properties in the radio spectrum, indicating the presence of relativistic matter.

=== Circumstellar material model ===
Almost all observed SLSNe have had spectra similar to either a Type Ic or Type IIn supernova. The Type Ic SLSNe are thought to be produced by jets from fallback to a black hole, but Type IIn SLSNe have significantly different light curves and are not associated with gamma-ray bursts. Type IIn supernovae are all embedded in a dense nebula probably expelled from the progenitor star itself, and this circumstellar material (CSM) is thought to be the cause of the extra luminosity. When material expelled in an initial normal supernova explosion meets dense nebular material or dust close to the star, the shockwave converts kinetic energy efficiently into visible radiation. This effect greatly enhances these extended duration and extremely luminous supernovae, even though the initial explosive energy was the same as that of normal supernovae.

Although any supernova type could potentially produce Type IIn SLSNe, theoretical constraints on the surrounding CSM sizes and densities do suggest that it will almost always be produced from the central progenitor star itself immediately prior to the observed supernova event. Such stars are likely candidates of hypergiants or LBVs that appear to be undergoing substantial mass loss, due to Eddington instability, for example, SN2005gl.

=== Pair-instability supernova ===
Another type of suspected SLSN is a pair-instability supernova, of which SN 2006gy may possibly be the first observed example. This supernova event was observed in a galaxy about 238 million light years (73 megaparsecs) from Earth.

The theoretical basis for pair-instability collapse has been known for many decades and was suggested as a dominant source of higher mass elements in the early universe as super-massive population III stars exploded. In a pair-instability supernova, the pair production effect causes a sudden pressure drop in the star's core, leading to a rapid partial collapse. Gravitational potential energy from the collapse causes runaway fusion of the core which entirely disrupts the star, leaving no remnant.

Models show that this phenomenon only happens in stars with extremely low metallicity and masses between about 130 and 260 times the Sun, making them extremely unlikely in the local universe. Although originally expected to produce SLSN explosions hundreds of times greater than a normal supernova, current models predict that they actually produce luminosities ranging from about the same as a normal core collapse supernova to perhaps 50 times brighter, although remaining bright for much longer.

=== Magnetar energy release ===
Models of the creation and subsequent spin-down of a magnetar yield much higher luminosities than regular supernova events and match the observed properties of at least some SLSNe. In cases where pair-instability supernova may not be a good fit for explaining a SLSN, a magnetar explanation is more plausible.

=== Other models ===
There are still models for SLSN explosions produced from binary systems, white dwarf or neutron stars in unusual arrangements or undergoing mergers, and some of these are proposed to account for some observed gamma-ray bursts.

== See also ==
- SN 2018cow
- Gamma-ray burst progenitors – Types of celestial objects that can emit gamma-ray bursts
- Hypernova – Supernova that ejects a large mass at unusually high velocity
- Quark star – Compact exotic star which forms matter consisting mostly of quarks
- Quark-nova – Hypothetical explosion of a neutron star
